= Seefeld Saddle =

Seefeld Saddle (Seefelder Sattel)
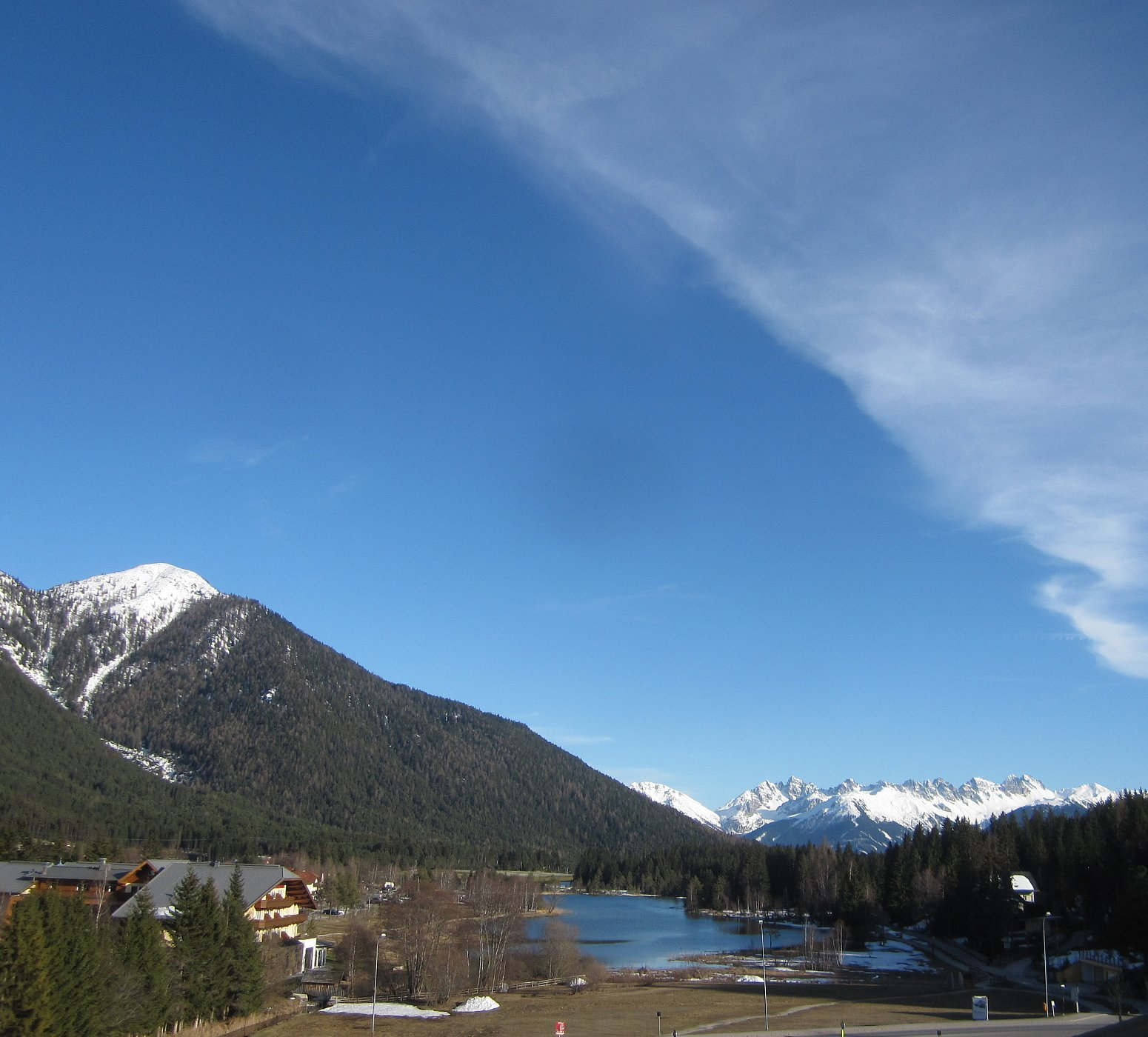
- View from the northwest of the Seefeld Saddle and the Wildsee lake. Behind: the Kalkkögel
- Interactive map of Seefeld Saddle (Seefelder Sattel)
- Elevation: 1,185 m (3,888 ft)AT
- Traversed by: B 177 (Seefelder Straße) E533

Third Approach
- Location: Tyrol (Austria)
- Range: Karwendel
- Coordinates: 47°19′05″N 11°11′50″E

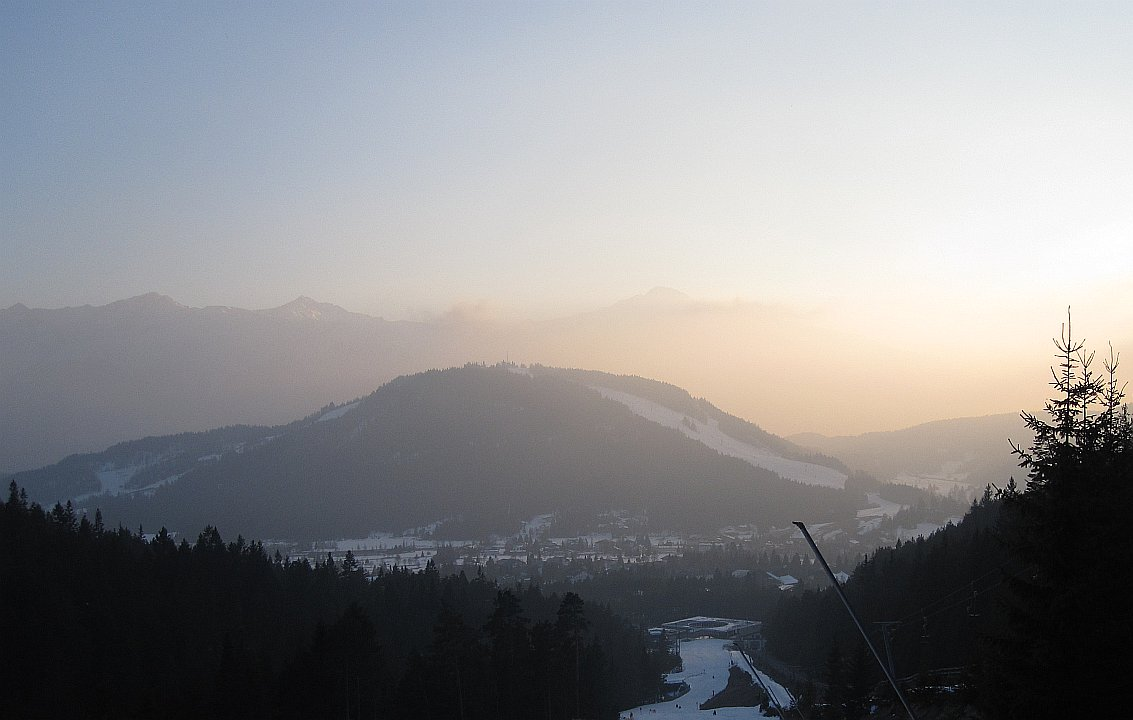
View from the northeast towards the Gschwandtkopf. Below: the Seefeld Saddle

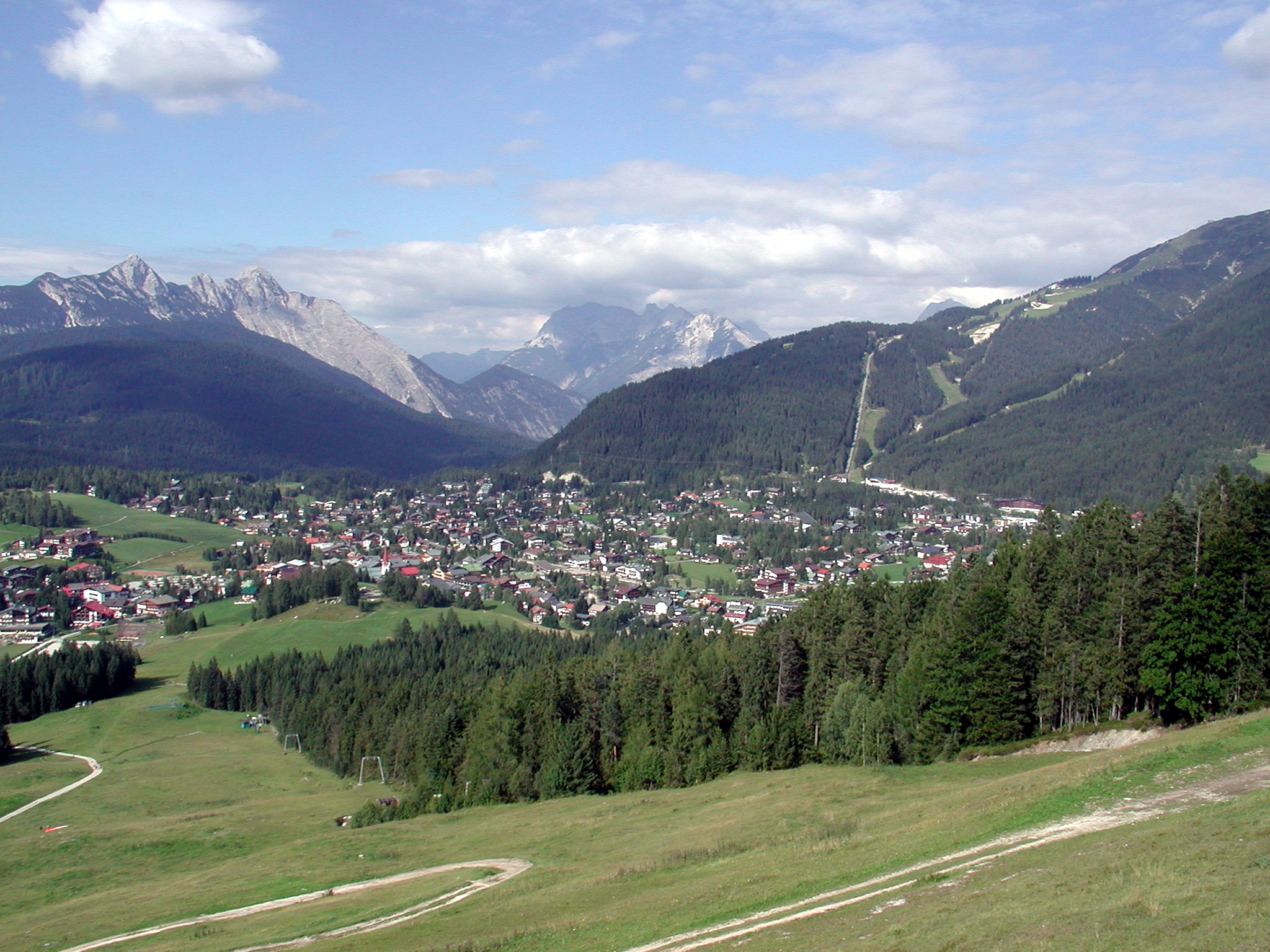
View from the Gschwandtkopf looking northeast to Seefeld; the Seefeld Saddle is on the right behind the trees

The Seefeld Saddle (German: Seefelder Sattel) is a saddle and mountain pass, 1,185 m (AA), in the Northern Limestone Alps in the Austrian federal state of Tyrol. Two major transport routes run over it: the Seefelder Straße (B 177) and the Mittenwald Railway. On the Seefeld Plateau north of the saddle lies the village and ski resort of Seefeld in Tirol (1,180 m (AA)).

== Geography ==
=== Location ===
The Seefeld Saddle lies west of the Erlspitze Group (max. 2,405 m (AA)), a sub-range of the Karwendel Alps, and east of the Mieminger Range (max. 2,768 m (AA)). To the south the terrain descends via the Zirler Berg down to the Inn valley, to the north of the plateau lie the Wetterstein Mountains (max. 2,962 m (AA)) and the Arnspitze Group (max. 2,196 m (AA)). The actual pass height is next to the municipal boundary between Seefeld and Reith to the south in the subdistrict of Auland on agricultural land southeast of the Wildsee lake and north-northwest of the junction of the Landesstraße 36 and the Seefelder Straße (B 177). East of the saddle rise the Reither Spitze (2,374 m (AA)) and the Seefeld Spitze (2,221 m (AA)) to its north. To the west is the Gschwandtkopf (1,495 m (AA)).

=== Watershed ===
The Seefeld Saddle is located on the watershed between the Inn and Isar rivers. Whilst the water of the Mühlbach northeast of Auland drains through the Niederbach southwards into the Danube tributary of the Inn, the waters of the Raabach and Haglbach flow through the Seebach (draining the Wildsee) as the Drahnbach and Gießenbach northeast into the Danube tributary, the Isar.

== Transport ==
=== Road ===
The Seefelder Straße (B 177) runs over the Seefeld Saddle. It approaches from the southeast from Zirl in the Inn valley (with a junction at Innsbruck with the A12 or B 171) over the south and east flanks of the Zirler Berg (with a gradient of up to 16%) through Reith and Seefeld and then heads northeast to the village of Scharnitz on the River Isar by the Austro-German border, crossing the Scharnitz Pass, from where it continues in Germany as the B 2 running past Mittenwald via Garmisch-Partenkirchen as far as Gartz (Oder). In the area of the eastern bypass around Seefeld the road reaches a height of more than 1,220 m north of the saddle near the junction of Seefeld-Mitte. At Auland, south of the saddle, the Landesstraße 36 state road branches off the Seefelder Straße passing through Seefeld and heading for Telfs in the Inn valley.

=== Railway ===
A particularly winding section of the Karwendel Railway with many tunnels runs over the Seefeld Saddle roughly parallel to the Seefelder Straße. The line runs from Innsbruck via Seefeld and Mittenwald to Garmisch-Partenkirchen and has several stations or halts including Reith, Seefeld and Scharnitz.

== History ==
The Romans built the Via Raetia, a connecting road to Augusta Vindelicorum (Augsburg) over the Brenner Pass to Veldidena (today Innsbruck-Wilten) and continued it over the Seefeld Saddle and through the Scharnitz Pass. Unlike the Seefeld Saddle, the Scharnitz Pass is not a mountain pass, however, but more of a gorge. The Isar valley narrows as a result of the foothills of the Arnspitze Group near Scharnitz and gives travellers the impression of a gate (Lat. porta) compared with the valley floors on either side that broaden out in the direction of Mittenwald and Seefeld respectively.

The protect their road the Romans built the settlement of Mansio Scarbia at the Scharnitz Pass, from which the name Scharnitz is derived. The importance of the way of the Seefeld Saddle and through the Scharnitz Pass is evinced by the discovery of a Roman milestone near Partenkirchen; in addition the two most famous Roman road maps, the Itinerarium Antonini and Tabula Peutingeriana name this road as a primary military and trading route. The route was heavily used and probably built as a trafficable road. Remains of this Roman road may be seen near Klais, a section of sunken road there is still visible today with ruts worn into the surface.

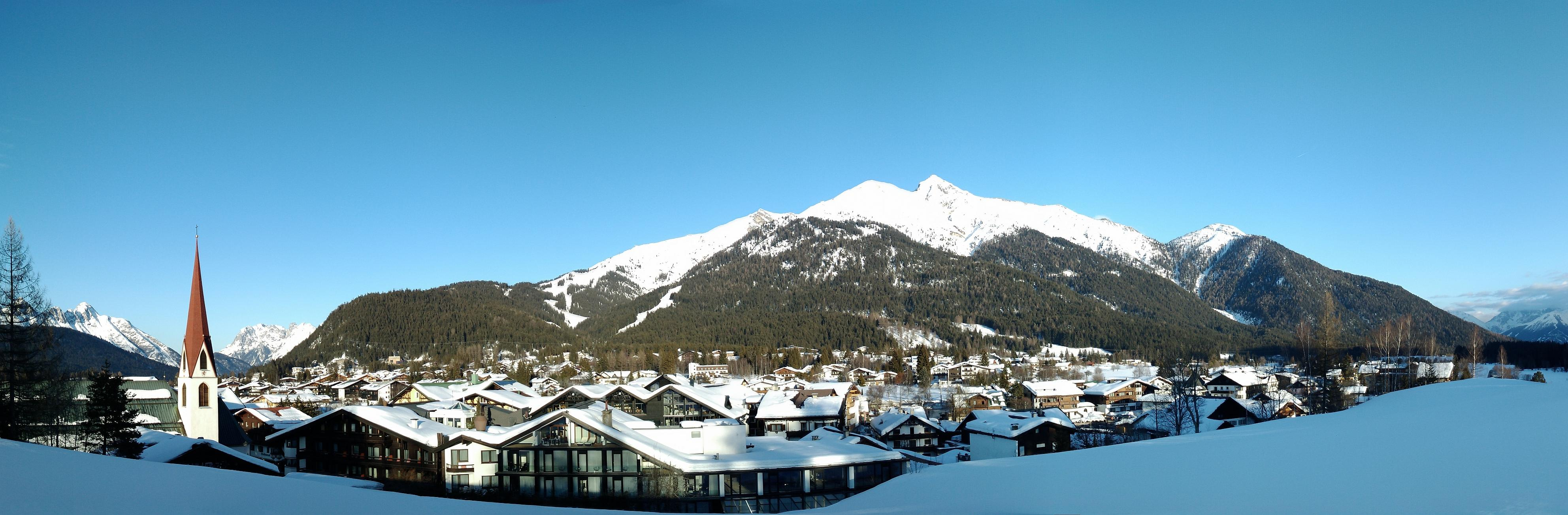
Seefeld by the Seefeld Saddle (right). Rear: the Reither Spitze;
on the right the valley runs down to the Zirler Berg in the Inn valley; on the left it heads for towards the Scharnitz Pass on the River Isar
