= Zirler Berg =

Mountain in Tyrol, Austria

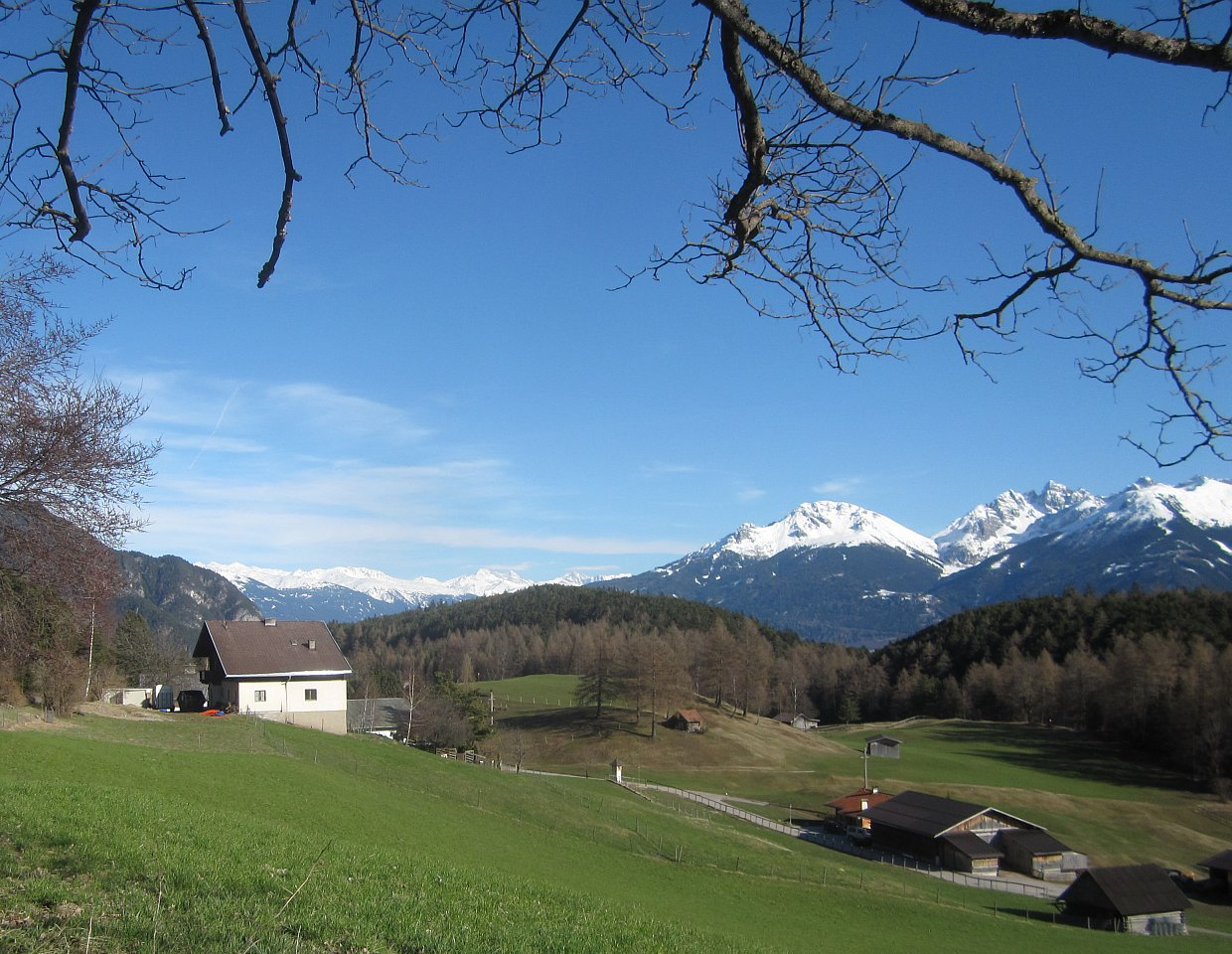
- View from the Seefeld Plateau looking southeast to the wooded Zirler Berg (centre). In front, between the houses, the plague column of Leithen; rear right: the Marchreisenspitze, to its left the Saile; left again on the horizon the Tux Alps

Highest point
- Elevation: 1,057 m (AA) (3,468 ft)
- Coordinates: 47°17′07″N 11°13′29″E

Geography
- Location within Austria
- Location: near Zirl; Innsbruck Land, Tyrol (Austria)
- Parent range: Karwendel

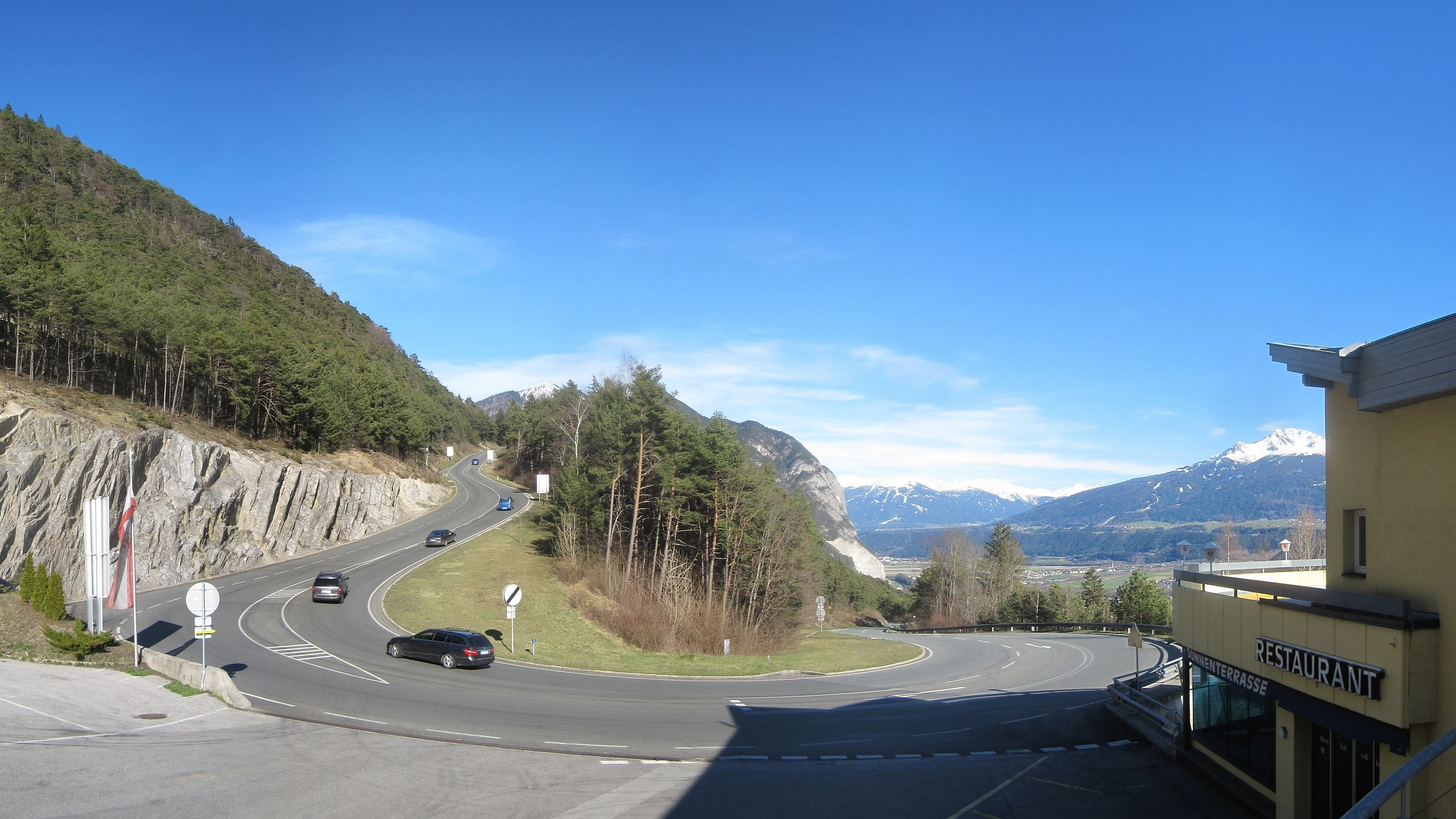
Hairpin bend on the Zirlerbergstraße; behind the Martinswand and the Inn valley; on the horizon, the Tux Alps

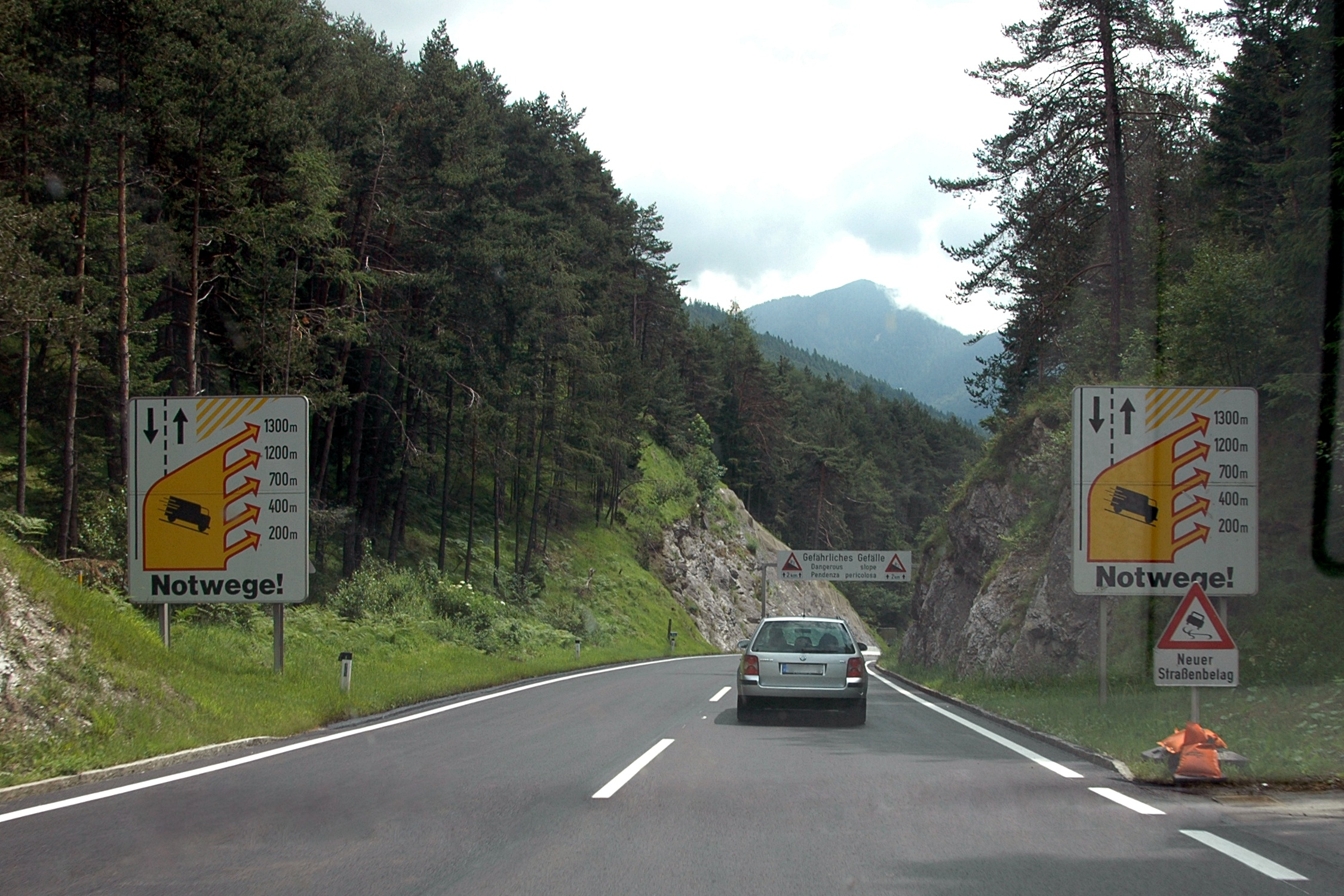
Start of the descent of the Zirlerbergstraße with information and warning signs for the escape lanes (2012)

The Zirler Berg near Zirl in the Austrian federal state of Tyrol is a mountain, 1,057 m (AA) high, in the Karwendel Alps, a western part of the Northern Limestone Alps. It is a southern foothill of the Reither Spitze (2,374 m) and is known mainly because the Seefelder Straße (B 177) on its southern slopes climbs through 388 metres in a distance of less than 4 kilometres from Zirl in the Inn valley to Leithen on the Seefeld Plateau.

== Location ==
The Zirler Berg is on the southeastern extremity of the Seefeld Plateau, which is roughly 1,200 m above sea level and lies between the Wetterstein (north), Karwendel (east) and Mieminger Ranges (west) and drops away to the Inn valley to the south and 600 metres below. The summit of the Zirler lies southeast of Reith and Leithen in the woods of the Zirler Wald, which cover the mountainside down to the Tiroler Straße (B 171) between Zirl and Telfs.

About 2.5 kilometres north of the Zirler Berg rises the Rauenkopf (2,011 m), which leads to the Reither Spitze (2,374 m) north of that, and about 2.5 kilometres northeast is the Brunstkopf (1,719 m), all peaks within the Erlspitze Group. A tributary of the Inn, the Schlossbach, flows through the gorge of Schlossbachklamm to the east. Some way to the north of the summit there is a 1637 plague column on the outskirts of Leithen.

== Geology ==
The actual summit of the Zirler Berg and its southern flank facing the Inn valley consists of strata of main dolomite; in the area of the mountain top, however, there are morainic deposits.

== Transport ==
=== Zirlerbergstraße ===
The southern section of the Seefelder Straße (B 177), runs up the southern slopes and across the eastern side of the Zirler Berg. This road section is also called the Zirlerbergstraße. The Seefelder Straße is oriented mainly in a south to north direction and climbs up the mountain from the Inn valley from Zirl (622 m) with a gradient of up to 16% heading for Leithen (1,010 m) and then continues through Reith, Auland and over the Seefeld Saddle (1,185 m) about 4 km (as the crow flies) northwest of the Zirler Berg to Seefeld. Between Zirl and Leithen the road climbs 388 metres in less than 4 km, and continues to climb, albeit less steeply, as it makes its way towards the Seefeld Saddle.

On the southern flank of the Zirler Berg lies the only hairpin on the Zirlerbergstraße – by the Gasthaus Zirlerberg Rast at about 818 m – where there are views of the Inn valley.

Between Zirl and Leithen the northern carriageway of the Seefelder Straße (the uphill carriageway) is closed to caravans with a permitted total weight of over 750 kg and the whole of the road between Zirl and Scharnitz is barred for lorries over 7.5 tonnes with the exception of local lorry traffic. Due to the steep gradient there are several escape lanes between Leithen and Zirl that branch off the downhill carriageway; they runn slightly uphill so that in an emergency, vehicles, especially lorries, can be braked by the gravel roadbed. The gradient also means that bicycles are not permitted on the downhill carriageway; although they are allowed to climb the road, this is not recommended due to the high levels of traffic.

=== Karwendel Railway ===
North-northeast of the Zirler Berg a particularly winding section of the Karwendel Railway with many tunnels runs over the Seefeld Saddle roughly parallel to the Seefelder Straße. The line runs from Innsbruck via Seefeld and Mittenwald to Garmisch-Partenkirchen and has several stations or halts including Reith, Seefeld and Scharnitz. East of the mountain the railway enters a wide curve over bridges and through tunnels on the south flank of the Rauenkopf and southwestern side of the Brunstkopf, crossing the Schlossbach.
