= Seefeld Plateau =

Montane valley and basin landscape in the Austrian state of Tyrol

Coordinates: 47°19′43″N 11°11′34″E

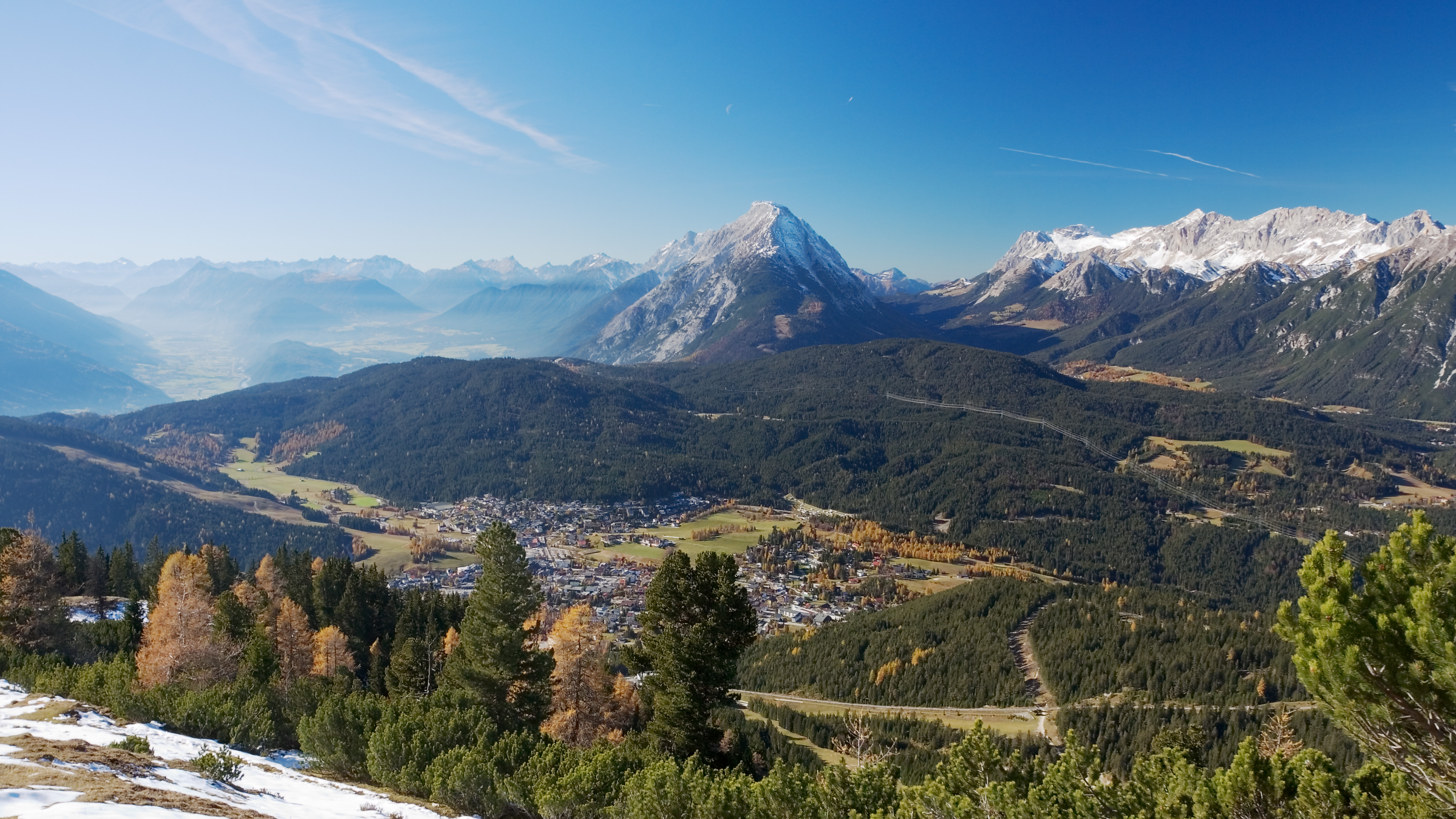
View of the Seefeld Plateau looking west from the Härmelekopf. Behind the Upper Inn valley and the Hohe Munde; right: the Wetterstein Mountains

The Seefeld Plateau (German: Seefelder Plateau) is a montane valley and basin landscape in the North Tyrolean Limestone Alps about 500 metres above the Inn valley in the Austrian state of Tyrol. The plateau covers the valley basin around the villages of Seefeld in Tirol and Scharnitz as well as the valley of Leutaschtal.

== Location ==
The Seefeld Plateau runs northwards from the edge of the Inn graben at the Zirler Berg. It lies at a height of around 1,200 m above sea level (AA) in the North Tyrolean Limestone Alps between the Wetterstein Mountains to the northwest, the Mieming Mountains to the west and the Karwendel to the east. The Seefeld Saddle (1,185 m above sea level (AA)), a mountain pass and saddle south of Seefeld, forms a watershed, north of which the plateau drains towards the Isar and south of which it drains into the Inn.

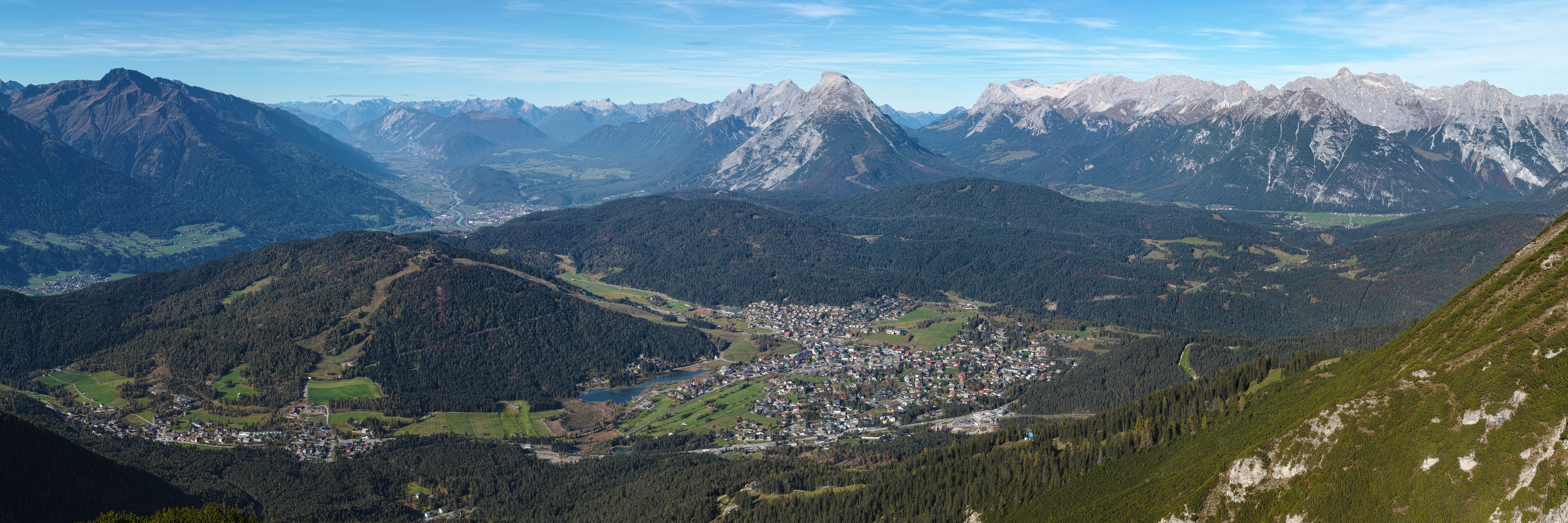
The Seefeld Plateau as seen from east-south-east with Seefeld in Tirol in the foreground.

== Geology and flora ==
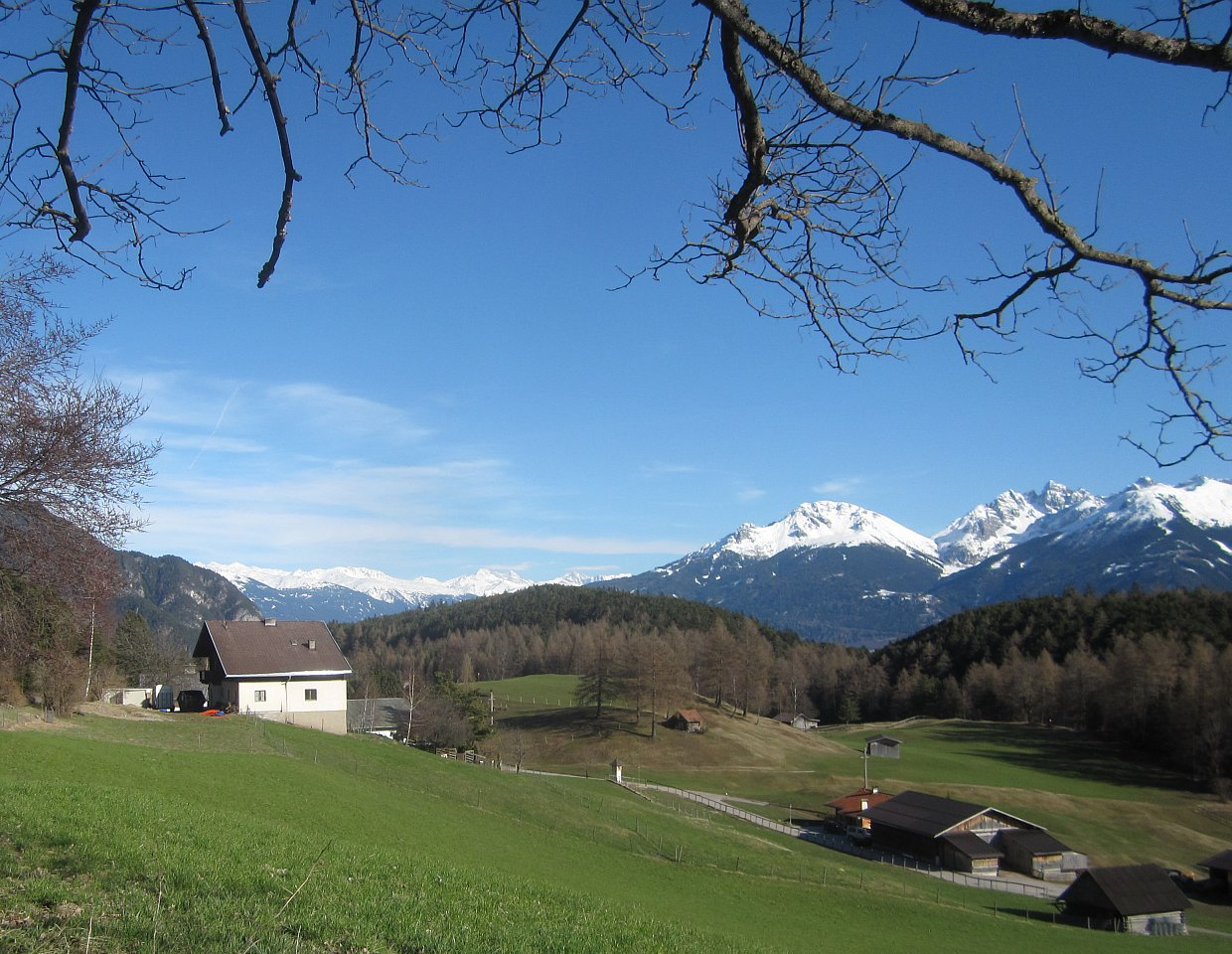
View from Leithen of the Zirler Berg (centre: wooded)

The dominant rocks of the Seefeld Plateaus are Wetterstein limestone and main dolomite with scattered occurrences of bituminous slate. A branch of the ice age Inn Glacier scoured out several basins and left lakes behind such as the Wildsee, the Möserer See and the Wildmoossee as well as numerous raised bogs like the Reither Moor that were formed by the silting up of lakes.

The plateau lies in the montane altitude zone. On its slopes are fir and beech mixed woods interspersed with spruce. The meadows around the villages are mainly false oat-grass pastures that are used as hay meadows or for grazing.

== Economy and transport ==
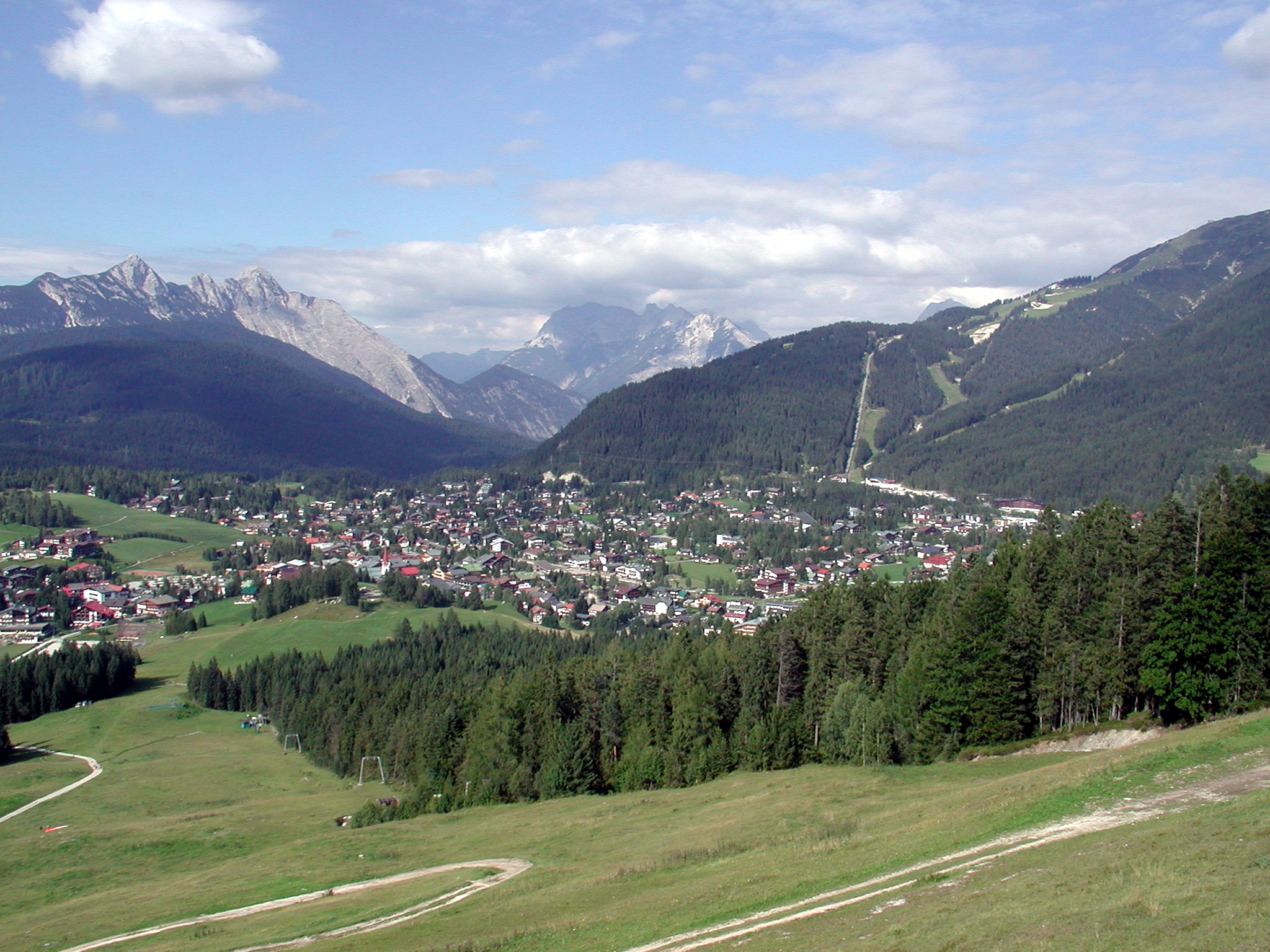
View from the Gschwandtkopf looking northeast towards Seefeld in Tirol

With around 1.74 million overnight stays per year, evenly divided between winter and summer (as at 2013), tourism is by far the most important economic factor on the Seefeld Plateau. The area has developed itself into a centre for Nordic skiing and was the venue for Nordic competitions in the Winter Olympics of 1964 and 1976, the 1985 & 2019 Nordic Ski World Championships and many other major events. In summer the Karwendel Alps are a major attraction for hikers and mountain bikers.

The plateau may be reached on the Seefelder Straße (B 177) road that runs over the Seefeld Saddle from the Inn valley as well as other state roads. The Mittenwald Railway also runs across the plateau from north to south, stopping at several stations including Scharnitz, Seefeld and Reith.
