= Kainzenbad station =

Railway station in Germany

Kainzenbad
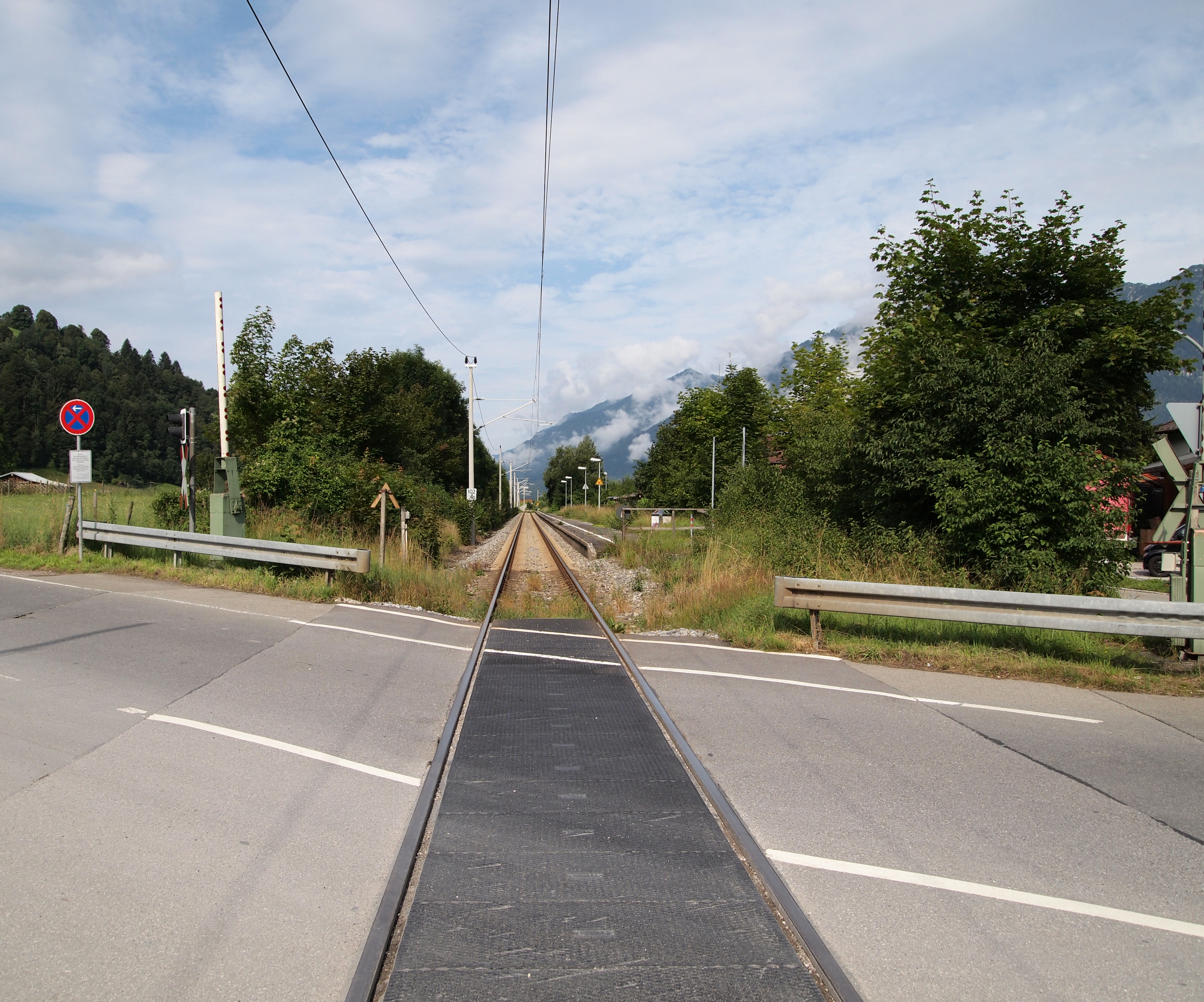
- 2014

General information
- Location: Wildenauer Straße/Fritz-Müller-Straße; 82467 Garmisch-Partenkirchen; Bavaria; Germany
- Coordinates: 47.4830°N 11.1170°E
- System: Hp
- Owner: Deutsche Bahn
- Operator: DB Netz; DB Station&Service
- Lines: Mittenwald Railway (KBS 960)
- Platforms: 1 side platform
- Tracks: 1
- Train operators: DB Regio Bayern

Construction
- Parking: no
- Cycle facilities: no
- Accessible: yes

Other information
- Station code: 7527
- DS100 code: MKAI
- IBNR: 8003146
- Category: 6
- Website: www.bahnhof.de
Location
- Location within Bavaria Location within Germany Location within Europe

Kainzenbad station (German: Haltepunkt Kainzenbad) is a railway station in the municipality of Garmisch-Partenkirchen, located in the Garmisch-Partenkirchen district in Bavaria, Germany.

== Operation ==
Since 1984, the station has only been used for New Year's jumping at the nearby Große Olympiaschanze.

== Future ==
It is planned to permanently reactivate the Kainzenbad stop. However, the new platform is to be built south-east of the old stop on the other side of the tracks to provide better access to the ski stadium and the Garmisch-Partenkirchen hospital. The costs of the reactivation would be borne by Deutsche Bahn if a study yet to be prepared concludes that 100 accesses per day will be achieved.

== Notable places nearby ==
- Große Olympiaschanze
