= Seefelder Straße =

State road B177
- Landesstraße B177

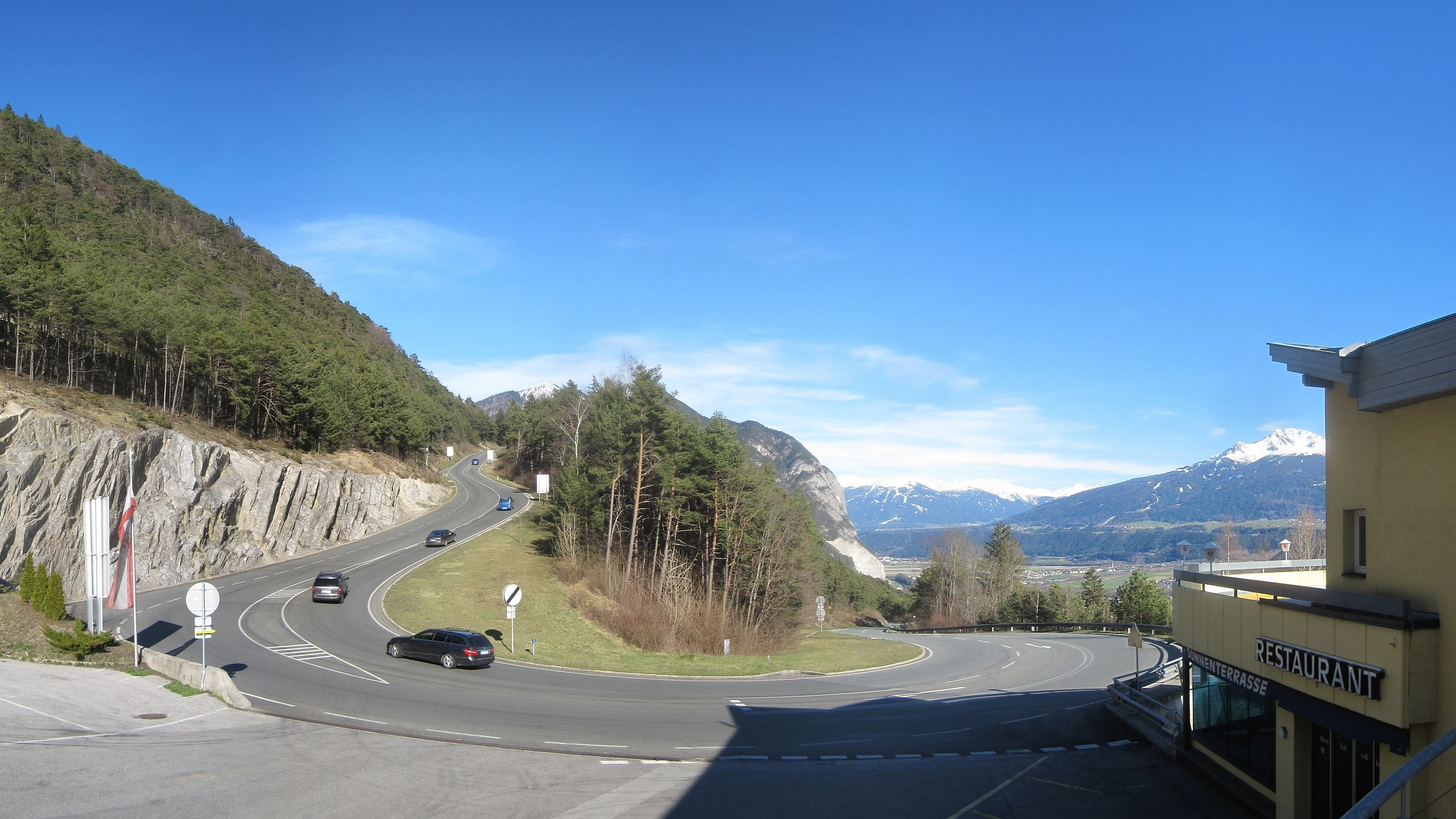
- Seefelder Straße at the Zirler Berg

Route information
- Part of E533
- Length: 21.2 km (13.2 mi)

Location
- Country: Austria
- Regions: Tyrol

Highway system
- Highways of Austria; Autobahns; Expressways; State Roads

Seefelder Straße (B 177) is a 21.2 km long former federal road or Bundesstraße - now classified as a "priority road" or Straße mit Vorrang - in the Alps in the Austrian federal state of Tyrol. It links the Inn valley with Scharnitz and the Scharnitz Pass on the border with Germany, running past the Zirler Berg, over the Seefeld Saddle and past Seefeld. It is part of the E533 European route.

The Karwendel Railway runs more or less parallel with the Seefelder Straße, crossing it several times.

== Route ==
The Seefelder Straße runs through the Northern Limestone Alps, between the mountain ranges of the Karwendel (max. 2,749 m (AA)) to the east, the Mieminger Mountains (or: Mieming Chain; max. 2,768 m) to the west and the Wetterstein Mountains (max. 2,962 m above sea level (NN)) to the northwest.

The road runs in a generally northwesterly direction from the junction of Zirl-Ost (ca. 590 m (AA)) on the Inn Valley Autobahn (the A 12), initially heading east and then north past Zirl (622 m), where it runs over the south and east flanks of the Zirler Berg (1,057 m) with a maximum gradient of 16% and only one hairpin bend; there it is also known as the Zirlerbergstraße. It then runs through Leithen (1,009 m) to Reith (1,130 m), which it passes to the east.
