= Rauenkopf =

Mountain in the Austrian state of Tyrol

- Rauchenkopf
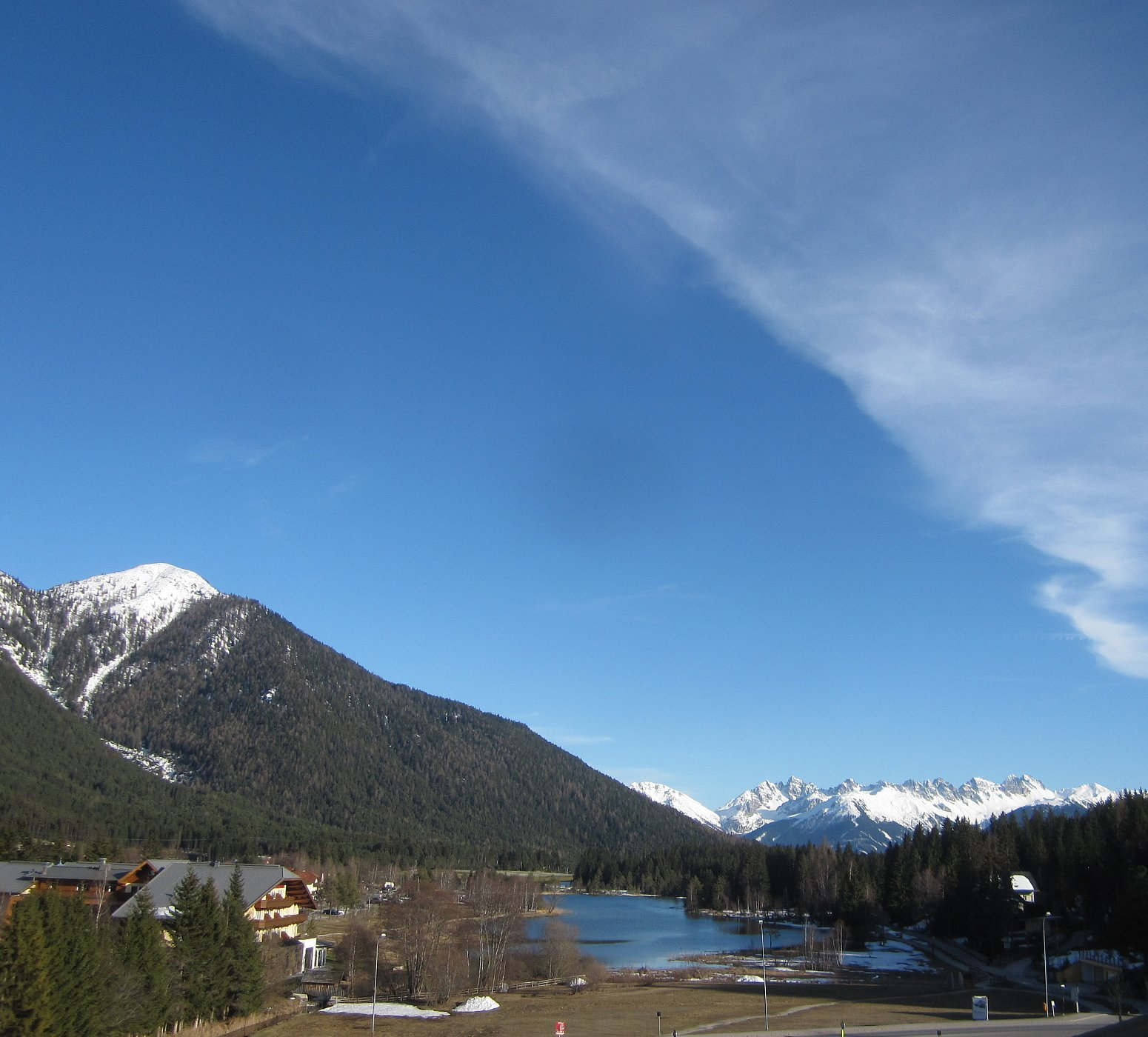
- The Rauenkopf (left) with the lake of Wildsee in the foreground

Highest point
- Elevation: 2,011 m (AA)
- Coordinates: 47°18′30″N 11°13′41″E

Geography
- Location within Austria
- Location: near Reith bei Seefeld; Innsbruck Land, Tyrol (Austria)
- Parent range: Karwendel

The Rauenkopf, also Rauchenkopf, is a mountain northeast of Reith bei Seefeld in the Karwendel Alps in the Austrian state of Tyrol. It is 2,011 metres high.

== Ascent ==
There is no marked route to the top. However a mountain path to the Reither Spitze, known as the Reither Spitzsteig, passes by 250 metres northwest of the summit.
