= Schlossbach (Inn) =

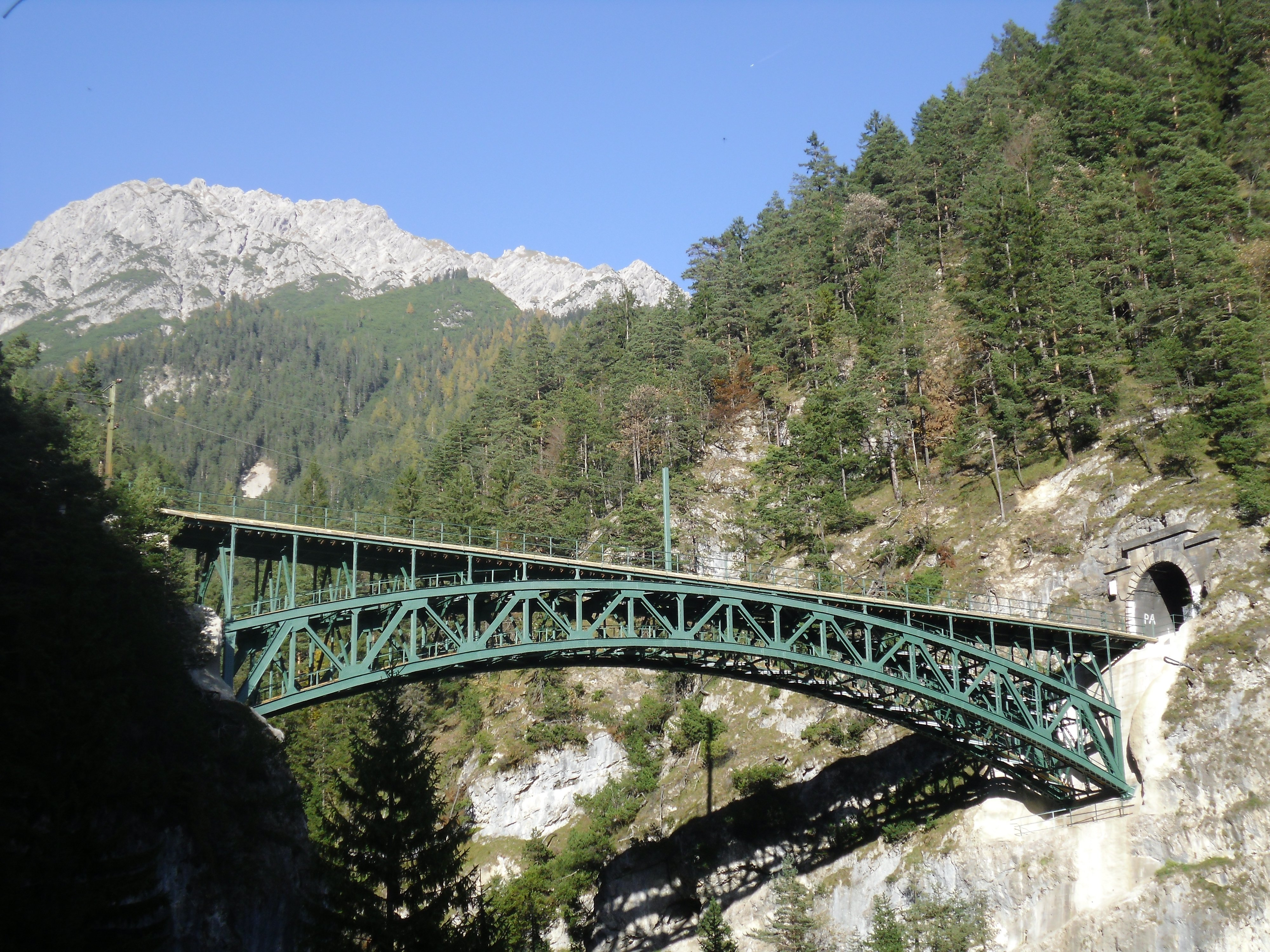
- Schlossbachgraben Bridge

Location
- Country: Austria
- State: Tyrol
- Reference no.: AT: 2-8-127

Physical characteristics
- Source
  - location: below the Reither Spitze
  - coordinates: 47°18′33″N 11°14′38″E
  - elevation: 1,346 m (AA)
- Mouth
  - location: in Zirl into the Inn
  - coordinates: 47°16′10″N 11°14′09″E
  - elevation: 592 m (AA)
- Length: 5.5 km (3.4 mi)
- Basin size: 11.7 km^{2} (4.5 sq mi)

Basin features
- Progression: Inn→ Danube→ Black Sea
- Landmarks: Villages: Reith bei Seefeld, Zirl
- Tributaries
  - left: Grieskarbach
  - right: Pflegerbach

The Schlossbach is a river of Tyrol, Austria, a left tributary of the Inn.

The Schlossbach rises below the Reither Spitze in the municipality of Reith bei Seefeld and flows in a north to south direction. After around 1.5 km (0.93 mi) it collects the river Grieskarbach from the left. In its upper reaches is a gorge, the Schlossbachklamm (location: 47.297059°N 11.238778°E). This is traversed at a height of 60 metres (200 ft) by the Schlossbach Bridge which carries the track of the Mittenwald Railway. The railway bridge is a 66-metre-long (217 ft), trussed arch structure made of steel and a popular photograph subject.

After emerging from the narrow gorge into the Inn valley, the Schlossbach flows through Zirl and empties into the Inn southwest of the village. Together with the Ehnbach further east, it has pushed the Inn southwards and piled up the alluvial fan on which Zirl has been built.
