= Mittenwald Railway =

Railway line in Austria and Germany

Coordinates: 47°26′23″N 11°15′56″E

Innsbruck–Garmisch-Partenkirchen
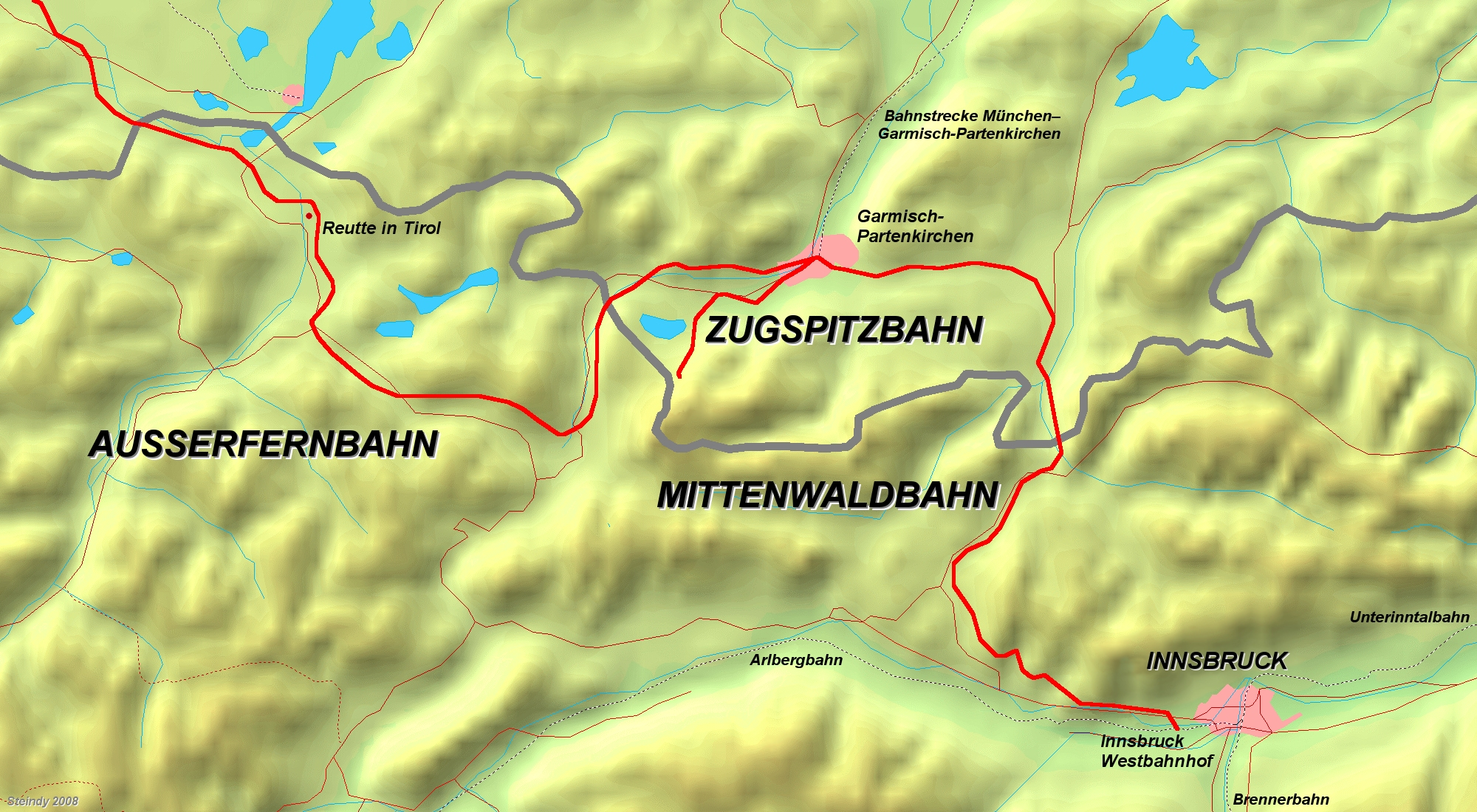

Overview
- Line number: 410
- Locale: Tyrol, Austria and Bavaria, Germany

Service
- Route number: 960
- Operator(s): ÖBB, DB

Technical
- Line length: 63.7 km (39.6 mi)
- Number of tracks: 1
- Track gauge: 1,435 mm (4 ft 8 1/2 in) standard gauge
- Minimum radius: 200 m (660 ft)
- Electrification: 15 kV/16.7 Hz AC overhead catenary
- Operating speed: 120 km/h (74.6 mph) 70 (max)
- Maximum incline: 3.8%

The Mittenwald Railway (German: Mittenwaldbahn), popularly known as the Karwendelbahn (Karwendel railway), is a railway line in the Alps in Austria and Germany. It connects Innsbruck via Seefeld (both in Tyrol, Austria) and Mittenwald to Garmisch-Partenkirchen (both in Bavaria, Germany).

The Mittenwald railway was built as an electric local railway from 1910 to 1912 by the engineers and contractors Josef Riehl and Wilhelm Carl von Doderer. The route was opened on 28 October 1912 and operated jointly by the Austrian Federal Railways and the Royal Bavarian State Railways. It was one of the first lines operated with high-tension single-phase AC-powered trains. Thus it had a substantial impact on the development of standards for electric railway operations in Central Europe. Together with the Ausserfern Railway (Ausserfernbahn) it connects the Austrian district of Außerfern (located west of the Fern Pass) with the Tyrol through Germany.

== Geography ==
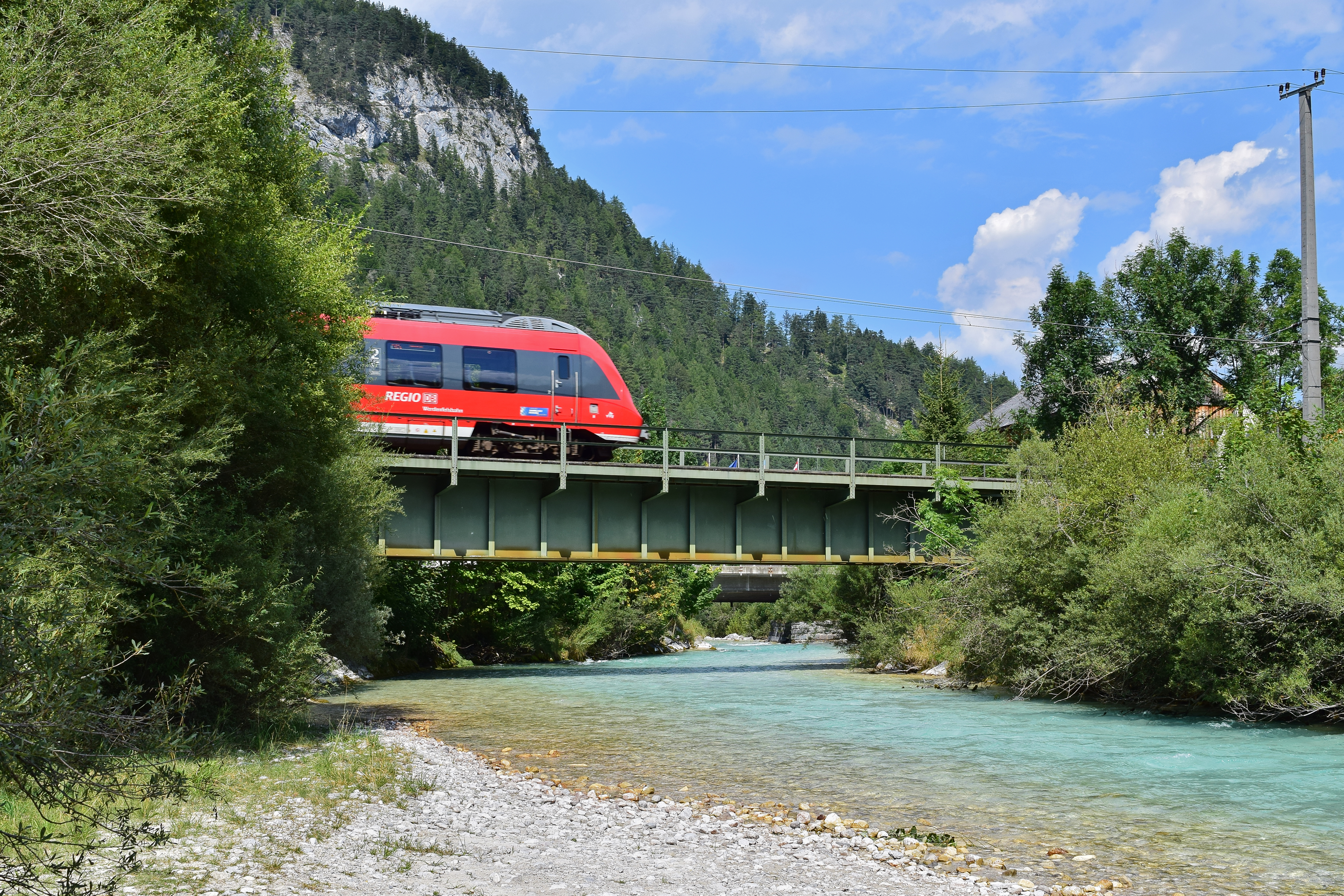
Mittenwald Railway crosses the Isar bridge in Scharnitz

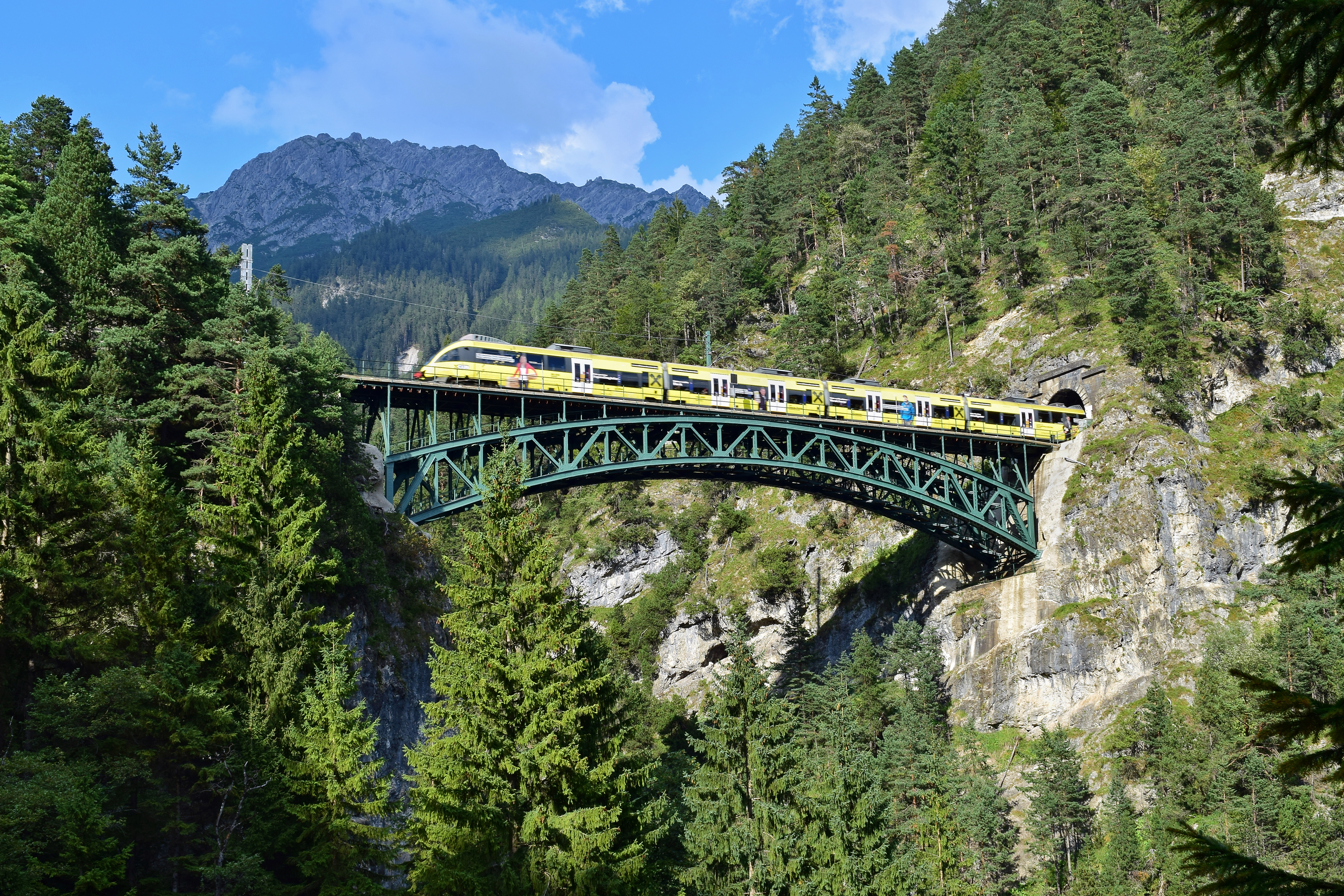
The Schlossbach bridge of the Mittenwald Railway

The Mittenwald railway runs mainly in the south-north direction between several mountain ranges of the Northern Limestone Alps. In the south it runs from the Inn valley from Innsbruck via Hochzirl and past the Zirler Berg mountain to Seefeld; the Mieminger Mountains lie to the west and the Karwendel range lies to the east.

From there it runs between the Karwendel range to the east and the Wetterstein range to the west over the Scharnitz pass and the Austria-Germany border to Mittenwald; at the Scharnitz pass it runs for a short distance along the upper reaches of the Isar river. It then bends to the west, running to Garmisch-Partenkirchen between the Wetterstein range to the south and the Ester Mountains to the north.

The most remarkable thing about the route of the Mittenwald Railway is the long section with many tunnels along the edge of the Martinswand (Martin’s wall), a rock face between Kranebitten and Hochzirl station, including the passage of the Martinswand Tunnel (1810.23 m) through the rock wall; it is the longest tunnel on the line. Slightly northwest of Hochzirl, the line runs over the southern flank of the Rauenkopf and southwestern flank of the Brunstkopf, crossing the Schlossbach on an elongated hairpin built with bridges and tunnels. Not far southwest of the bend, it passed the Zirl mountain.

== History ==
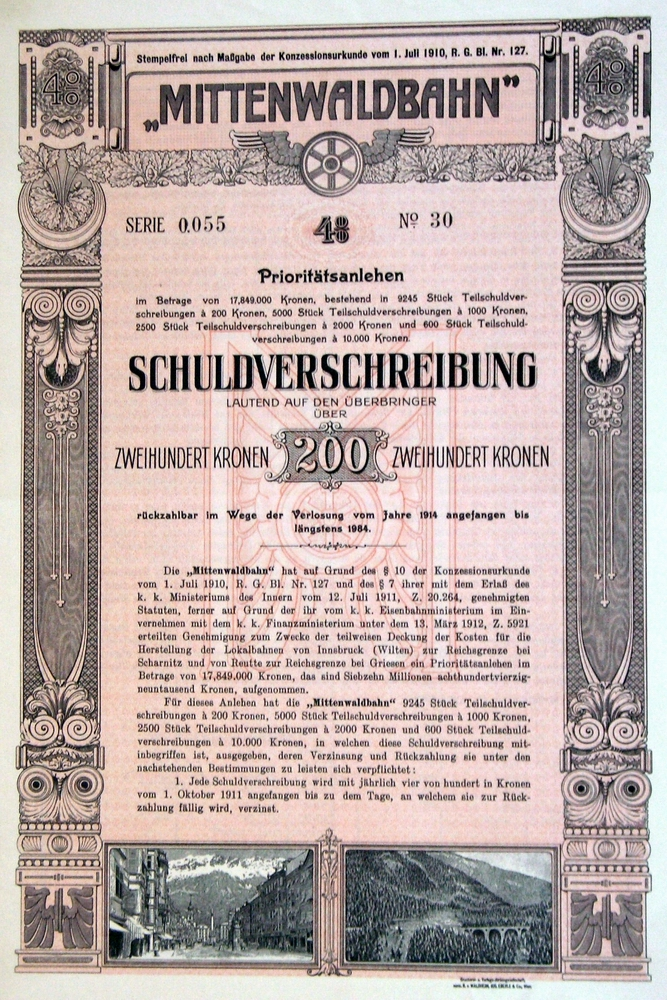
Raising of finance for the Austrian section of the Mittenwald Railway, Innsbruck, 1912

The engineer and contractor Josef Riehl had already presented a proposal in the late 1880s to the Austrian ministry of trade and economics (k.k. Ministerium für Handel und Volkswirthschaft) for a route first running east from Innsbruck to Hall and then after a bend back to the west largely in tunnels up to Seefeld. To obtain the concession for this project, it took many years of disputes over the financing of the project, which involved substantial outlays in advance, with no guarantee of a return.

When Riehl finally received the approval of the authorities for the construction of the Mittenwald line on the Austro-Hungarian side of the border, he formed a consortium with contractor and engineer, Wilhelm Carl von Doderer for the construction work. The managers of construction were the engineers, Karl Innerebneron, on behalf of Riehl, and August Mayer, on behalf of Doderer. The contract included all matters necessary for the operation of the railway. In addition to the line construction, this included land acquisition, rolling stock, electrical equipment and the power plant. The contract set the fixed price of 24.4017 million krone to be paid to the contractors Riehl and von Doderer, who thus carried all risk of possible cost overruns.

In terms of its length, the Mittenwald railway was a very expensive rail project due to its many tunnels. It was planned from the beginning that it would be electrified. To supply the power needed, a hydroelectric power station was constructed on the Ruetz river near Stephansbrücke (Stephen's bridge) in the Stubai valley, with two turbines each delivering 4000 horsepower. As a result of the extension of the line into Bavaria, that section of the line was supplied with power from the Walchensee power station, which was finished by 1924. Despite the difficulties, the section of the Mittenwald railway on the territory of Austria-Hungary was built in the remarkably short time of about two years.

The Bavarian section between Garmisch and Mittenwald goes back to a request in 1896 by the council of Mittenwald for Lokalbahn AG of Munich to develop a project for the continuation of the Murnau–Garmisch-Partenkirchen local railway (Localbahn Murnau–Garmisch–Partenkirchen) to Mittenwald.

This route was opened on 1 July 1912, however, in contradiction to the plan, it was at first operated with steam locomotives, as neither the power station nor the electric locomotives were ready. On the Austrian side it was electrically operated from 28 October 1912. Operations in Bavaria switched to electric traction on 25 April 1913.

During the Second World War, the steep gradient and the short stations prevented much involvement in supplying the military. In 1945, the Mittenwald Railway was judged by the Allies to be strategically important, and a total of six air raids were flown against the Gurglbach Viaduct. The Inn bridge in Innsbruck was also repeatedly the target of air raids.

In 1950 during the winter there was an avalanche at the Martinswand siding, during which a locomotive was completely buried. The railway was reopened with the help of French occupation troops. In 1968 the site was made safe from avalanches by the construction of a protective roof.

With the holding of the 1976 Winter Olympic Games in Innsbruck and Seefeld, the Mittenwald line was expected to have high loadings and all stations were equipped with colour light signals. Seefeld station was also replaced by a new station. The superstructure was adapted so that locomotives of both Deutsche Bundesbahn and the Austrian Federal Railways (Österreichische Bundesbahnen, ÖBB) could operate on the line. Due to the ample size of its bridges for the time, it was even possible to operate with two locomotives in multiple.

Rail operations ran smoothly during the 1976 Olympic Winter Games, just as they did during the 1985 Nordic World Ski Championships in Seefeld.

in the 1980s, when many streets in Innsbruck were widened, it was necessary to raise the line where it passes through Innsbruck, especially by building new bridges.

== Route ==
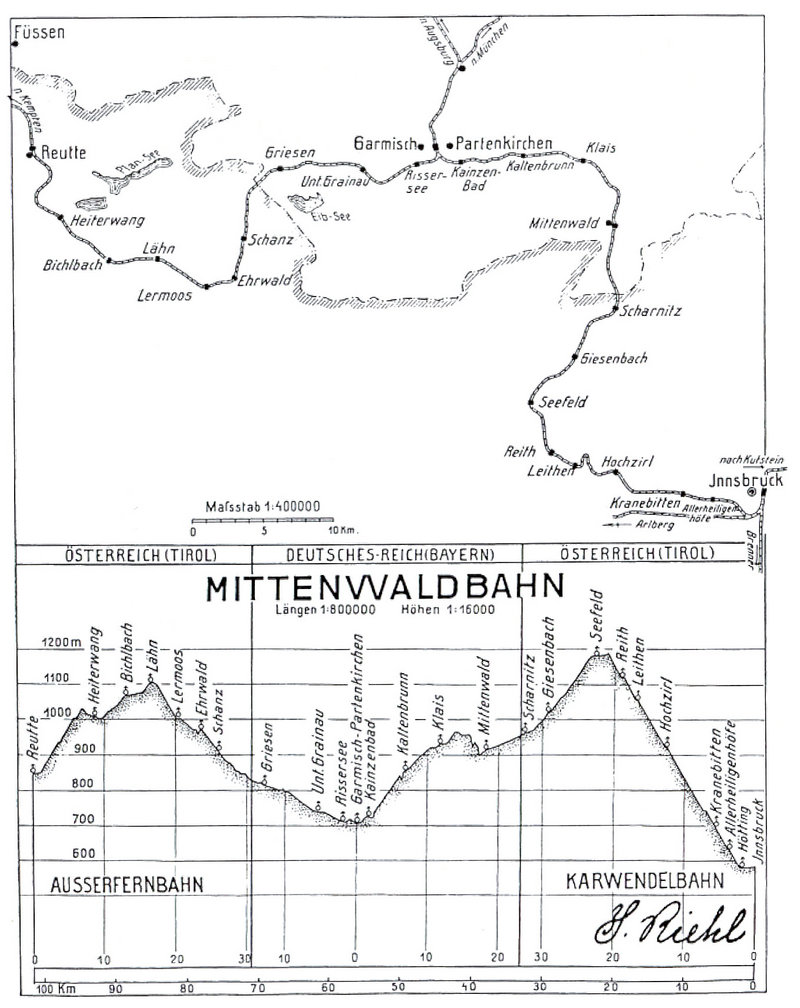
Track plan and profile

The Mittenwald Railway follows a bold route, planned by the pioneering railway engineer, Josef Riehl. The Mittenwald line crosses the Inn on a steel bridge and runs through the city of Innsbruck as an elevated line to the west and north of Innsbruck West station.

In March 1910 the first sod was turned at the legendary Martinswand cliff. The abrupt transition from the Inn valley to the Martinswand and the Schlossbach valley presented the biggest challenges. The line crosses the Schlossbach at an altitude of about 60 m above the water level over an iron arch truss bridge with a length of 66 m. The Finstertal Viaduct was built on the karst slope of the Hechenberg (mountain). A hangviadukt ("slope viaduct", that is a viaduct built on a slope, requiring much higher supports on the down side that on the up side) was built in the Schlossbach graben. The Kaiserstand Viaduct was built beneath the ruins of Fragenstein. The Gurgelbach Viaduct was built near Reith and the Isar Bridge was built near Scharnitz.

Many bridges are similar in size to bridges on the Albula Railway. While stone could be used in Switzerland, concrete had to be used in the Tyrol. The tunnels also had to be lined because of the weak rock.

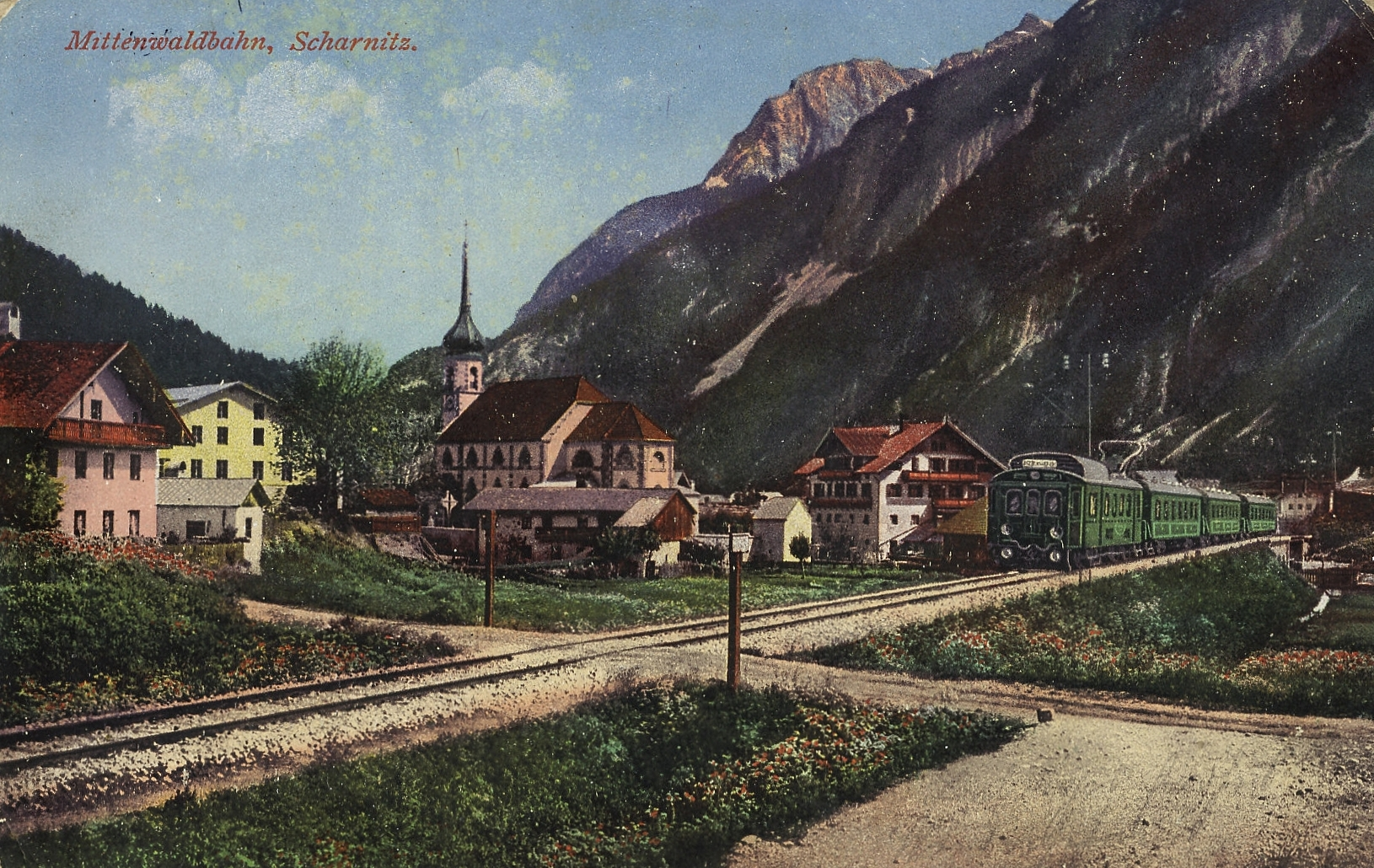
Scharnitz in 1912 with new electric Mittenwald Railway

The construction of the tunnels in the Martinswand was particularly difficult and a 17 km long high voltage line had to be built from Innsbruck just for the operation of the machinery. Diesel locomotives brought the rock to dumps. The ingress of water stopped the construction work on the western side of the tunnels and an electric pumping plant had to be installed. The barracks on the eastern side had to be built far below the steep edge due to the lack of space. A funicular railway had to be built to transport workers and materials from the Inn to the site.

The smallest radius of curvature of the Mittenwald Railway is 200 m. The maximum gradient of 3.8 percent is significantly greater than the 3.1 percent of the Arlberg Railway, or the 2.6 percent of the Brenner Railway.

At Innsbruck West station the line branches off from the Arlberg Railway and reaches in Hötting its lowest point of 580 m above sea level. Its highest point on the Seefeld saddle is at 1,184 m above sea level. This difference in altitude is achieved over 19.2 km of line. After this the line descends at up to 3.0 percent to Garmisch-Partenkirchen, where it connects to the line via Murnau and Weilheim to Munich and to the Außerfern Railway via Reutte to Kempten.

== Operations ==
=== Trains ===
The Mittenwald railway mainly serves regional and tourist traffic; international long-distance traffic usually uses the Munich–Innsbruck route via Rosenheim and Kufstein (Munich–Rosenheim, Rosenheim–Kufstein and Lower Inn Valley lines). Since the start of the winter timetable in 2010 until 2025, one or two pairs of Intercity-Express services operated daily from Berlin via Munich to Innsbruck over the Mittenwald Railway with intermediate stops at Mittenwald and Seefeld. As a result, Seefeld became the highest Intercity-Express stop in Europe. Regionalbahn services operate hourly on the German side, running from Mittenwald to Garmisch-Partenkirchen and on to Munich. Half of these Regionalbahn operate between Innsbruck and Munich via Mittenwald; these services are branded as REX in Austria. On the Austrian side line S6 of Tyrol S-Bahn runs from the border at Scharnitz via Seefeld to Innsbruck every hour.
