= Gschwandtkopf =

Mountain in the Austrian state of Tyrol

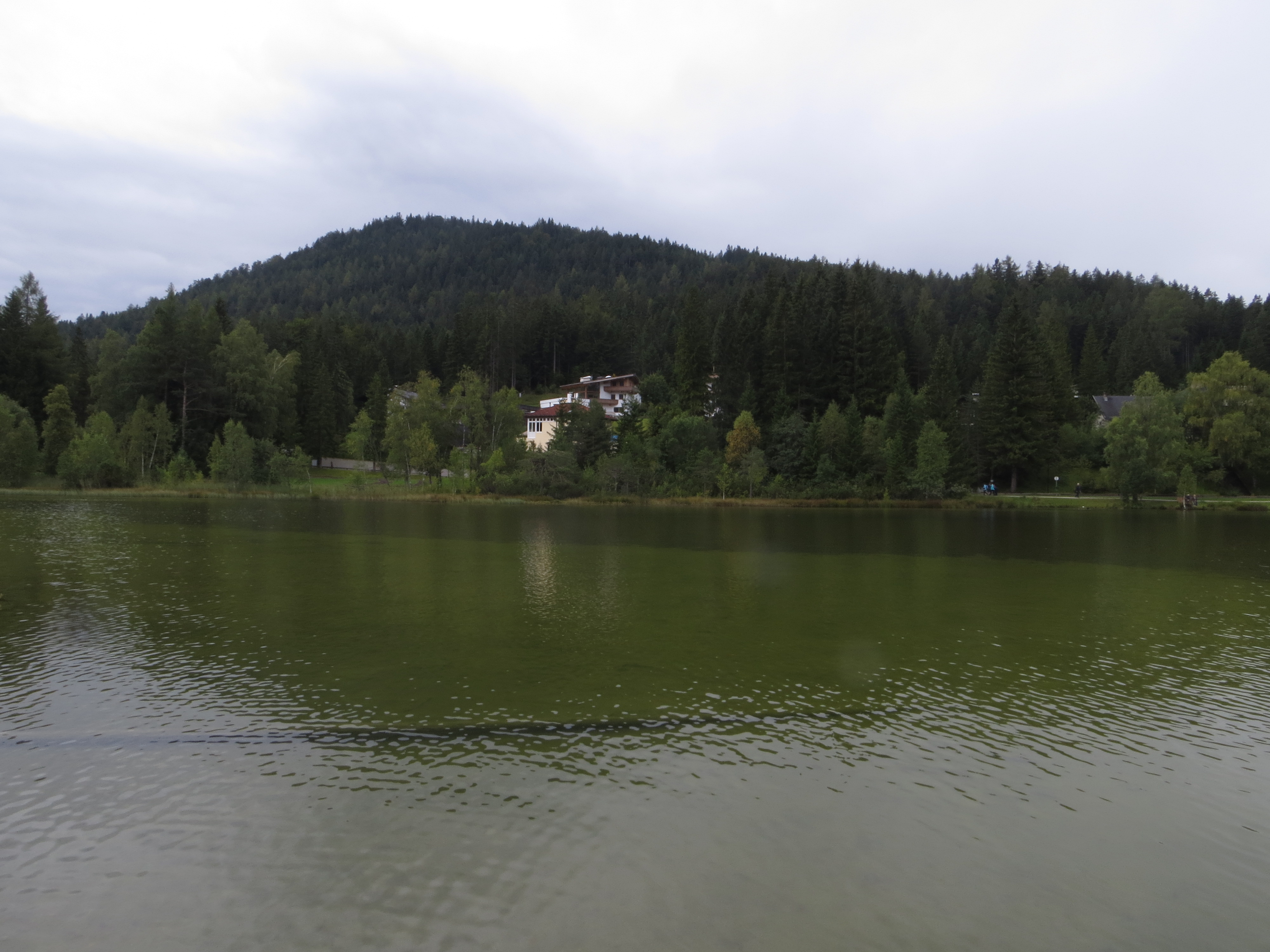
- The Wildsee near Seefeld with the Gschwandtkopf behind

Highest point
- Elevation: 1,495 m (AA)
- Coordinates: 47°18′50″N 11°10′44″E

Geography
- Location within Austria
- Location: near Seefeld; Innsbruck Land, Tyrol (Austria)
- Parent range: Mieming Range

Climbing
- Normal route: gravelled track from Mösern

The Gschwandtkopf is a mountain south of the ski resort of Seefeld in Tirol in the Austrian state of Tyrol. It is 1,495 metres high. There are two inns at the summit: the Ötzi Hut and the Sonnenalm.

== Geography ==
The Gschwandtkopf rises prominently above the surrounding Seefeld Plateau by some 300-400 metres. The summit is located about 1.5 kilometres south-southwest of the centre of Seefeld, about 1.5 km west-northwest of the village of Auland and 2.5 kilometres east-northeast of Mösern. The mountain is bounded to the west and northwest by the Möserer Tal valley, to the east and northeast by the Seefeld Plateau and to the south by the Hoher Wand, a high rock face above the Inn valley. At the northeastern foot of the Geschwandtkopf is the picturesque bathing lake of Wildsee.

== Winter sports ==
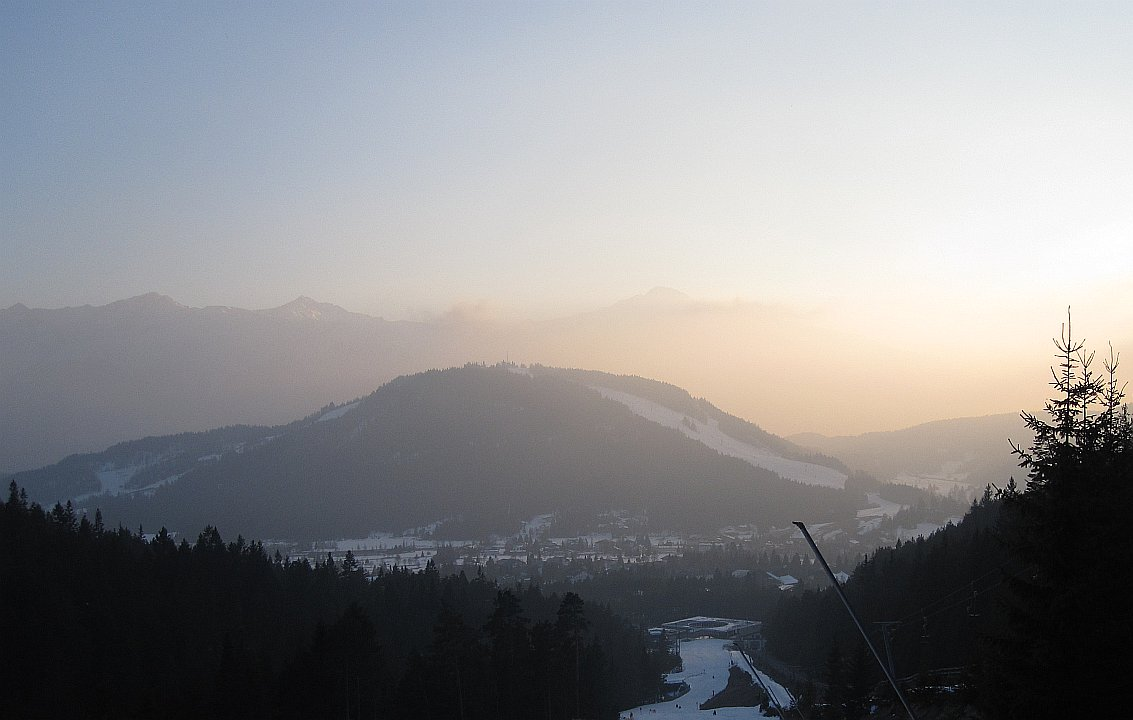
A wintry Gschwandtkopf seen from the northeast

The Geschwandtkopf has an Olympic ski jump at the foot of its northern slopes. It is also one of several ski areas at Seefeld. There is an eponymous chairlift from Seefeld to the summit and two shorter T-bar lifts at the bottom of the piste: the Olympialift and the Brunnenlift. Until 2013, another chairlift, the Sessellift Reith, used to run from Auland to the top. The majority of downhill runs are easy (blue) but there is at least one marked medium (red) route. There are also three lifts on the neighbouring Brennenkopf (1,494 m) linking the village of Mosern with the ski area on the Geschwandtkopf. There is a rodelbahn from the top to Auland. Around the base of the mountain are several cross-country skiing runs which are part of an extensive network in the Seefeld area.
