= Wildsee (Seefeld) =

Lake in Austria

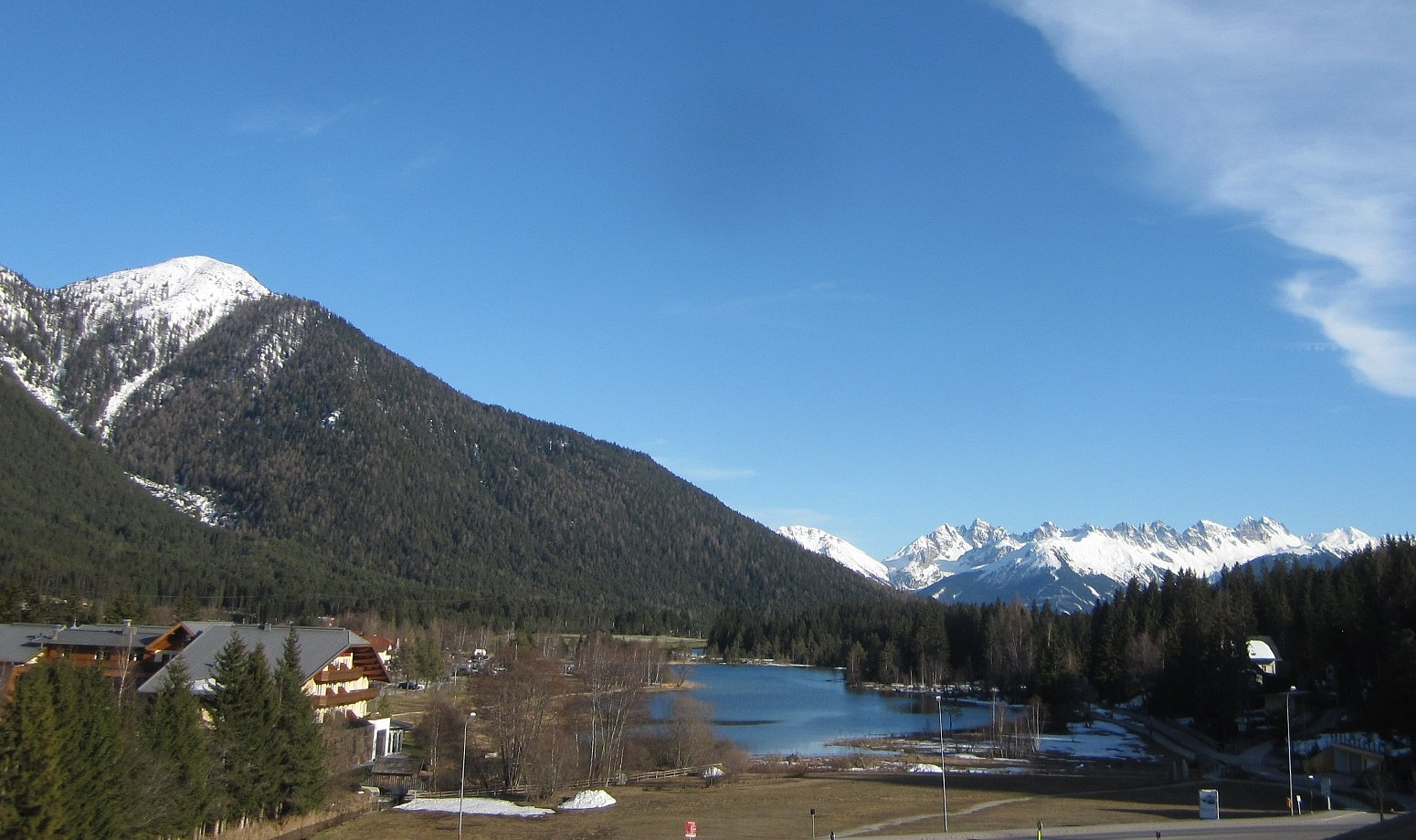
- The Wildsee seen from the northwest

- Location within Tyrol, Austria
- Location: Innsbruck-Land, Tyrol, Austria
- Coordinates: 47.32222°N 11.19083°E
- Primary inflows: Haglbach
- Primary outflows: Seebach
- Max. length: 650 m (2,130 ft)
- Max. width: 200 m (660 ft)
- Surface area: 6.1 ha (15 acres)
- Max. depth: 5.1 m (17 ft)
- Water volume: 78,500 m^{3} (2,770,000 cu ft)
- Shore length^{1}: 1,600 m (5,200 ft)
- Surface elevation: 1,177 m (3,862 ft)
- ^{1} Shore length is not a well-defined measure.

The Wildsee, occasionally also called the Seefelder See ("Lake Seefeld"), is a lake near the Austrian resort of Seefeld in Tirol at the foot of the Gschwandtkopf (1,495 m). It has an area of 6.1 hectares and a maximum depth of 5.1 metres. The majority of the lake belongs to the municipality of Seefeld, its south and west shores are part of Reith bei Seefeld.

The lake is fed from the Haglbach, which rises below the col of the Seefelder Joch and empties into the lake in the southeast, and water from the bog of Reither Moor and other smaller springs. Its catchment area is just under 7 km^{2}. It is drained northwards by the Seebach which empties into the River Isar. On the east shore of the lake are small beds of reed and sedge; on the west shore mixed forest runs down to the lake. South of the lake is the Reither Moor, a raised bog resulting from the silting up of the Wildsee in which mountain pine trees grow. The south shore and the Reither Moor are a nature reserve.

The Wildsee probably gave the village of Seefeld, first mentioned in 1022, its name. Emperor Maximilian I used it for fish farming and had lampreys introduced, which is why the lake also bore the name Lampretensee. The breeding of this fish, a prized delicacy at that time, only lasted for a few decades, however. Today, the Wildsee is a popular bathing lake with two beaches. According to limnological research, the lake has a low to medium nutrient content. Due to the bog-like character of the lake, visibility is only about 1 to 3 metres. In 2013 the water quality was classified as excellent.

The Wildsee is threatened by silting up as a result of the sediment transported to it by the Haglbach. In future a pond will be excavated east of Innsbrucker Straße in order to trap the sediment. There is also discussion about enlarging the lake.

== Gallery ==
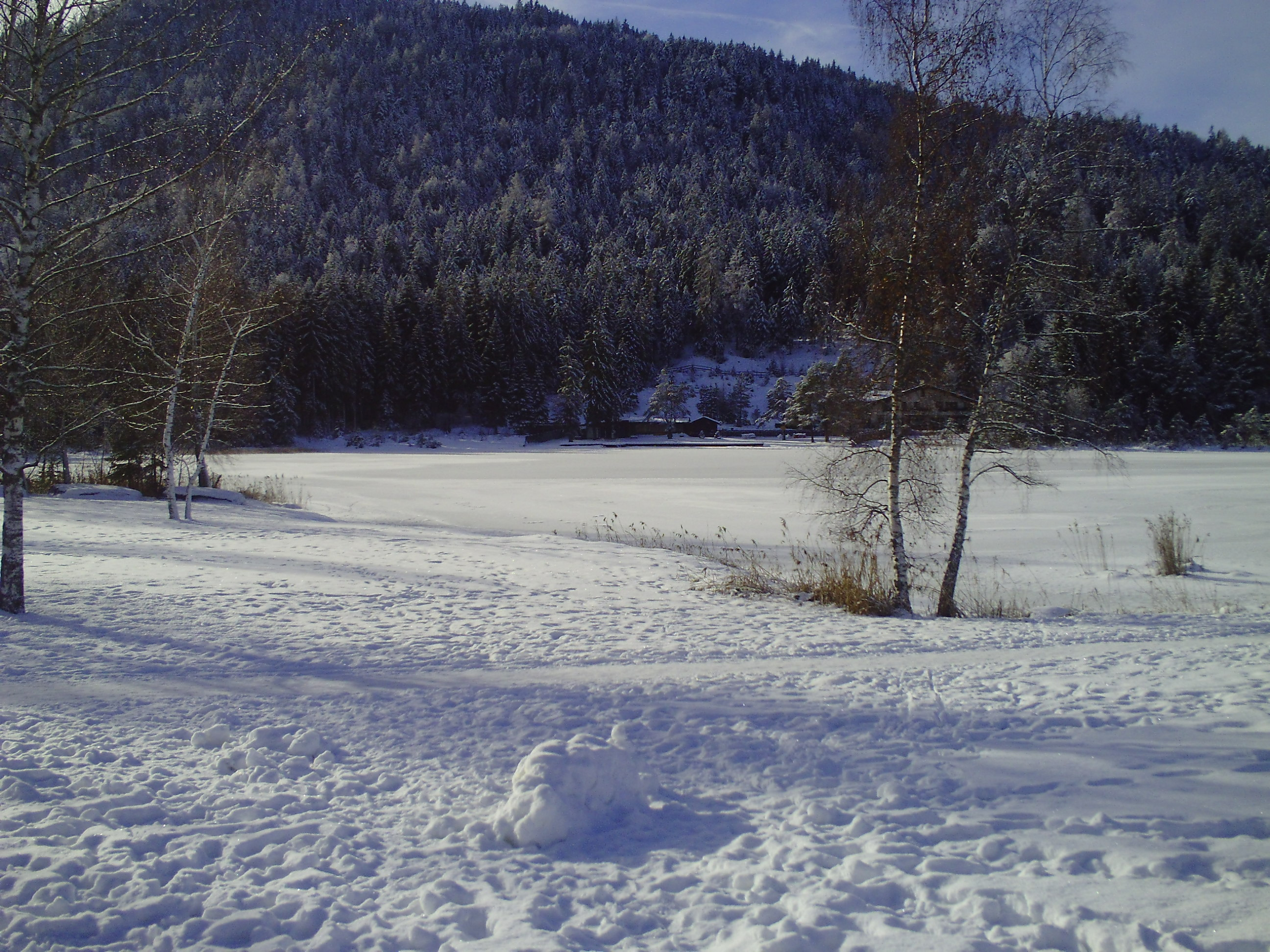
The frozen Wildsee in winter

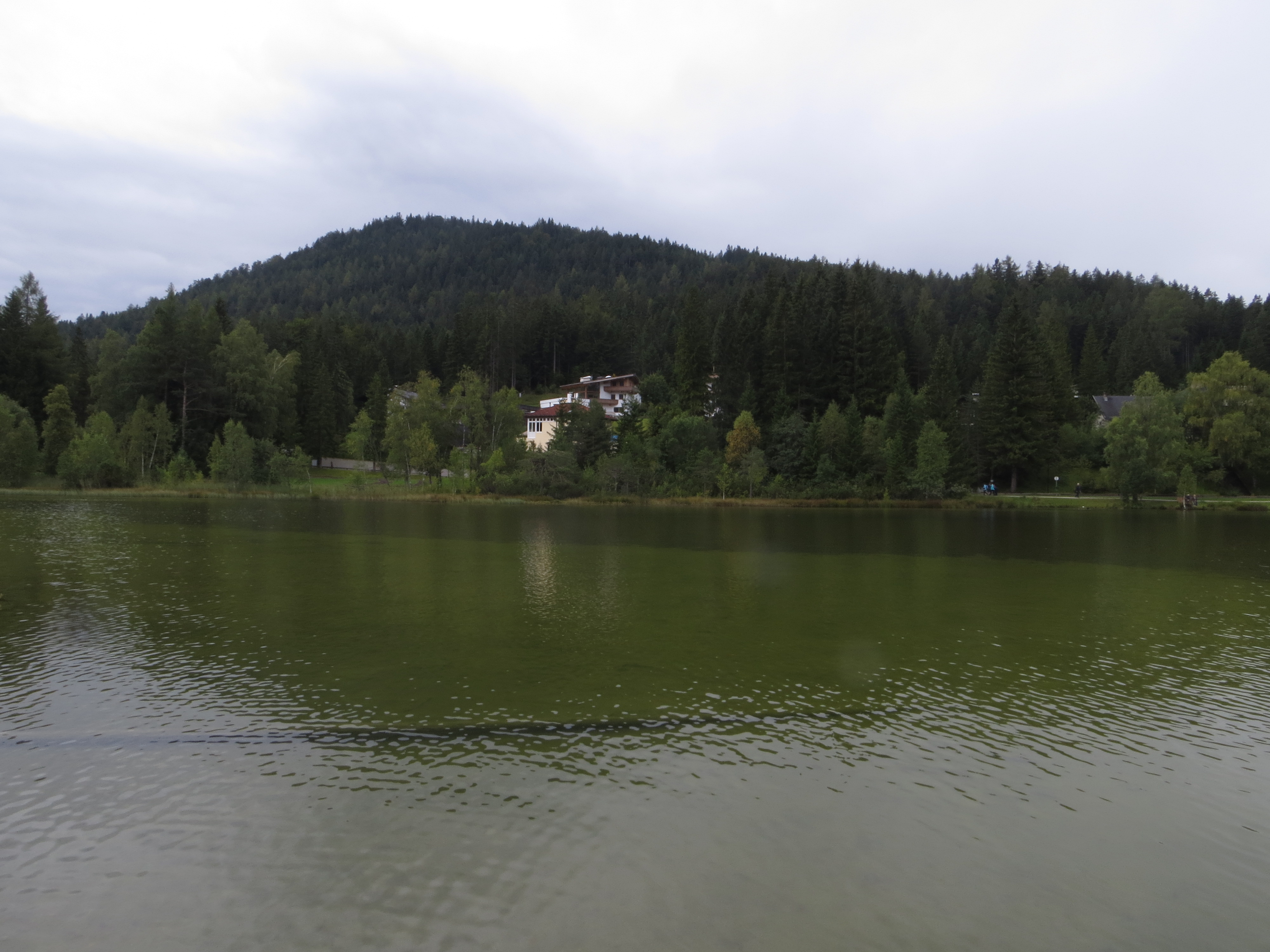
The Wildsee with the Gschwandtkopf behind

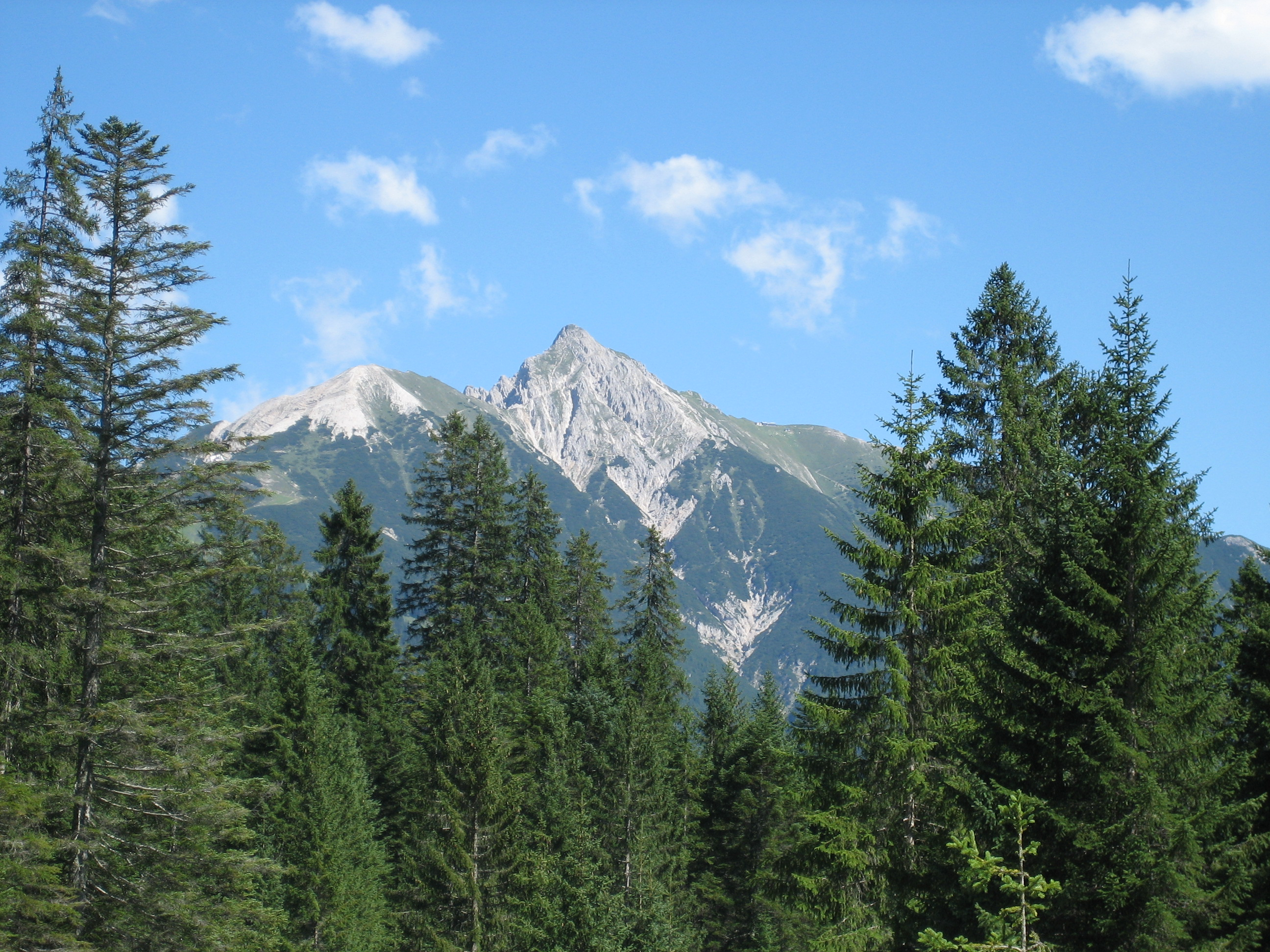
The Alps from Wildsee

== Literature and external links ==
- Notburga Wahlmüller: Beiträge zur Vegetationsgeschichte Tirols V: Nordtiroler Kalkalpen. In: Berichte des Naturwissenschaftlich-Medizinischen Vereins in Innsbruck, Vol. 72 (1985), pp. 101–144 (pdf)
- Tyrolean reserves: Reither Moor
