= Brunstkopf =

- Location within Austria

Highest point
- Elevation: 1,719 m (AA)
- Coordinates: 47°17′41″N 11°16′28″E

Geography
- Location: near Zirl; Innsbruck Land, Tyrol (Austria)
- Parent range: Karwendel

The Brunstkopf is a mountain immediately north of Zirl in the Karwendel Alps in the Austrian state of Tyrol. It is 1,719 metres high.

== Ascent ==
There are unmarked routes from the direction of the Garberskopf (1,903 m) along the arete to the northeast; and from the ridge to the south-southwest between the Lackental and Grabental re-entrants, the path branching off the mountain road (closed to private vehicles) above Hochzirl.
