= Reith bei Seefeld =

- Municipality
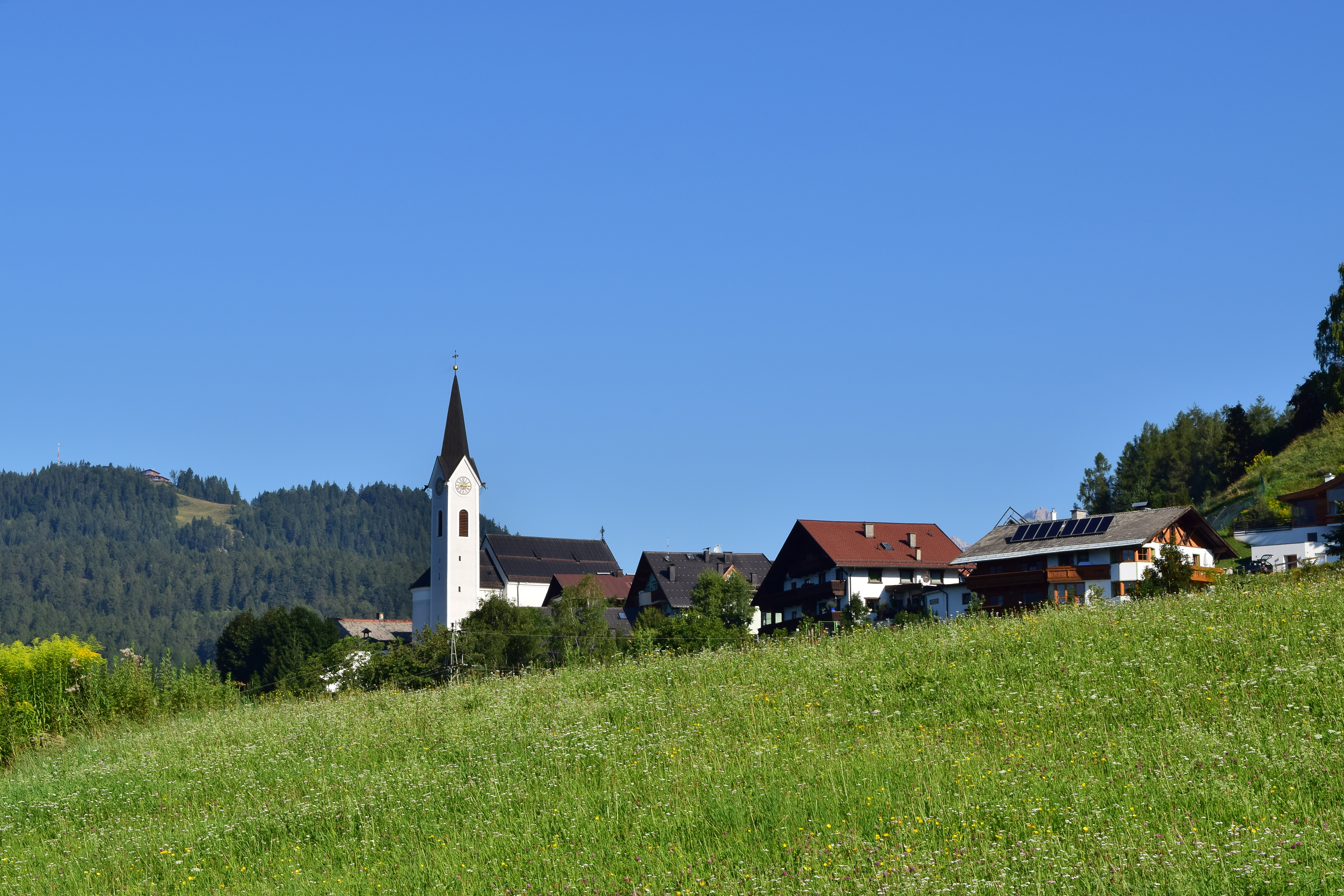
- View from southeast

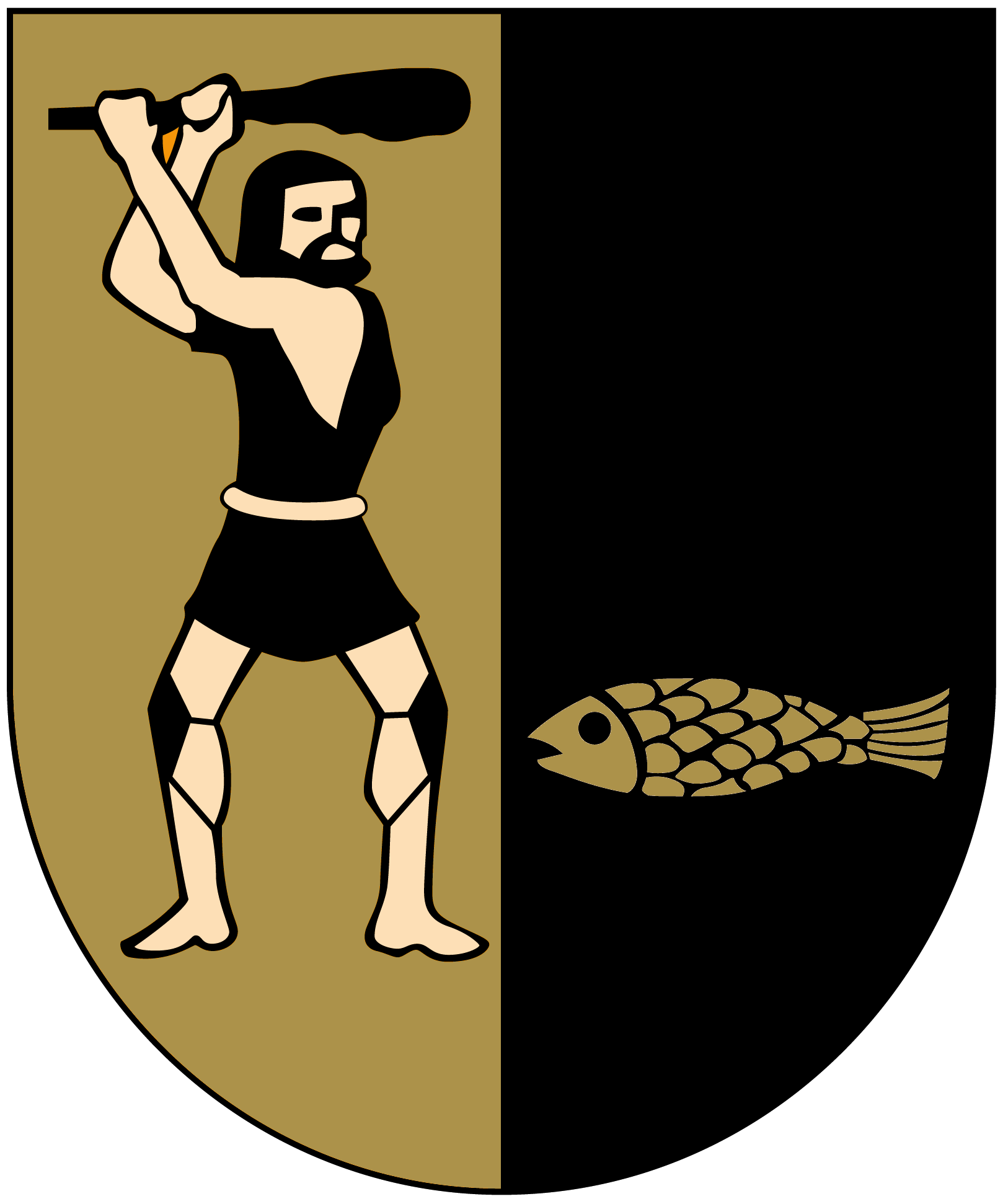
- Coat of arms

- Location within Austria
- Coordinates: 47°17′56″N 11°12′14″E
- Country: Austria
- State: Tyrol
- District: Innsbruck Land

Government
  - Mayor: Dominik Hiltpolt

Area
  - Total: 20.92 km^{2} (8.08 sq mi)
- Elevation: 1,180 m (3,870 ft)

Population (2021)
  - Total: 1,426
  - Density: 68.16/km^{2} (176.5/sq mi)
- Time zone: UTC+1 (CET)
  - Summer (DST): UTC+2 (CEST)
- Postal code: 6103
- Area code: 05212
- Vehicle registration: IL
- Website: www.reith-bei-seefeld.tirol.gv.at

Reith bei Seefeld is a municipality in the district of Innsbruck-Land in the Austrian state of Tyrol located 12.3 km northwest of Innsbruck and 3 km south of Seefeld in Tirol.

== Population ==
Historical population
Year	Pop.	±%
1869	390	—
1880	344	−11.8%
1890	328	−4.7%
1900	305	−7.0%
1910	595	+95.1%
1923	348	−41.5%
1934	409	+17.5%
1939	457	+11.7%
1951	615	+34.6%
1961	609	−1.0%
1971	736	+20.9%
1981	786	+6.8%
1991	882	+12.2%
2001	1,109	+25.7%
2011	1,142	+3.0%
