= Hinterautal-Vomper Chain =

Longest mountain chain in the Karwendel Alps in Austria

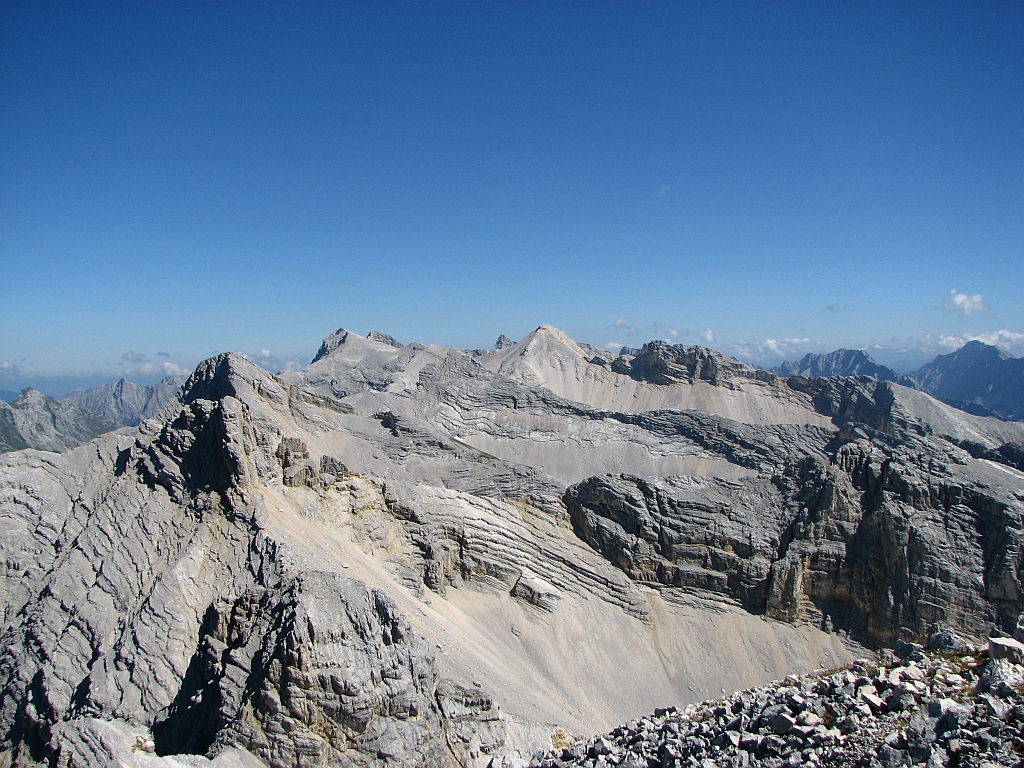
- The Hinterautal-Vomper Chain from the Pleisenspitze

Highest point
- Peak: Birkkarspitze
- Elevation: 2,749 m above sea level (AA)

Geography
- Location within Austria
- Location: Tyrol, Austria
- Range coordinates: 47°24′00″N 11°26′00″E
- Parent range: Karwendel

The Hinterautal-Vomper Chain (German: Hinterautal-Vomper-Kette), also called the main chain of the Karwendel (Karwendelhauptkette), is the longest mountain chain in the Karwendel Alps in Austria. It has numerous peaks that reach heights of 2,500 m, including the highest summit of the Karwendel, the Birkkarspitze (2,749 m (AA)), and its neighbour, the three Ödkarspitzen. While long ridges radiate south and north from the western part of the main chain, with typical Karwendel cirques nestling between them, the eastern part of the chain has an almost 1,000 m high, solid rock face on the northern side, which is most striking at the Laliderer Wand. The main chain is divided into the Hinterautal ("Hinterau Valley") chain (Hinterautalkette) in the west and the Vomper Chain (Vomperkette) in the east and runs through the Karwendel Alps from Scharnitz in the west to the village of Vomp in the east.

North of the Hinterautal-Vomper Chain is the Northern Karwendel Chain (Nördliche Karwendelkette), to the south follows the Gleirsch-Halltal Chain, large parts of which have steep, northern slopes, often vertical and hundreds of metres high which are typical of the four Karwendel mountain chains.

Along the western part of the Hinterautal-Vomper Chain runs a difficult, high alpine mountain path which is called the Toni Gaugg Mountain Path (Toni-Gaugg-Höhenweg) after the man who blazed it. This enables the Hinterautal chain to be traversed from the Pleisen Hut to the Karwendelhaus.

In the Northern Limestone Alps, to which the Karwendel belongs, there are a number of small and very small glaciers. In the Hinterautal-Vomper Chain is the only glacier of the Karwendel, the Eiskarln, north of and below the Eiskarlspitze.

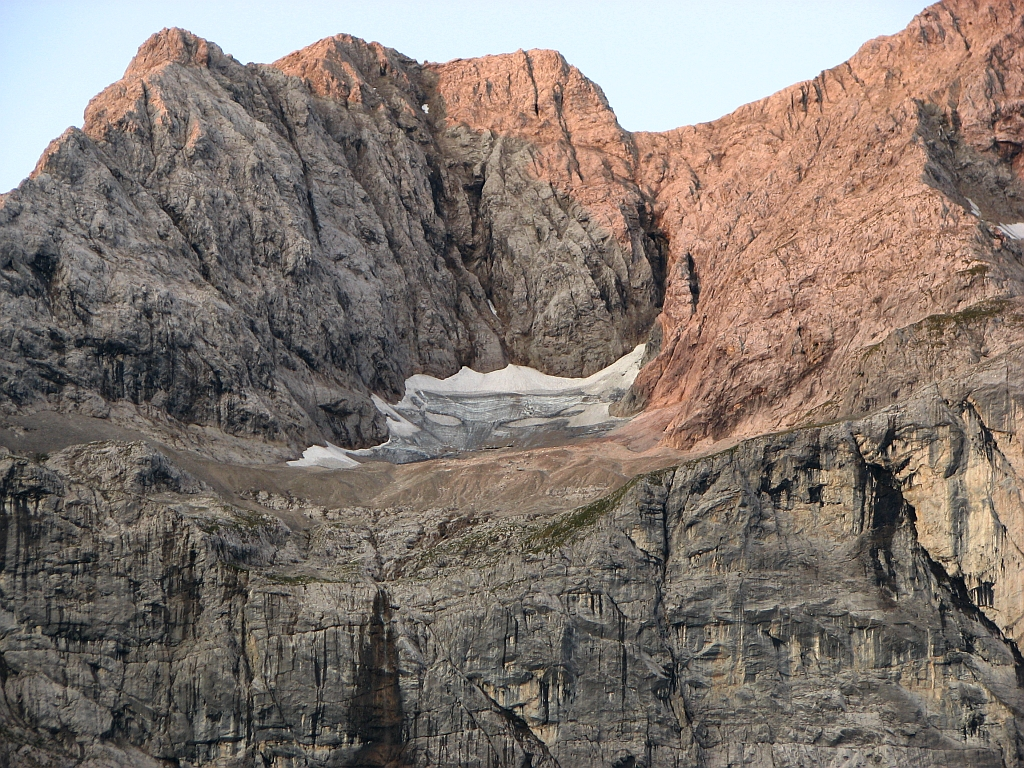
The Eiskarln, the only glacier of the Karwendel, lies north of and below the Eiskarlspitze

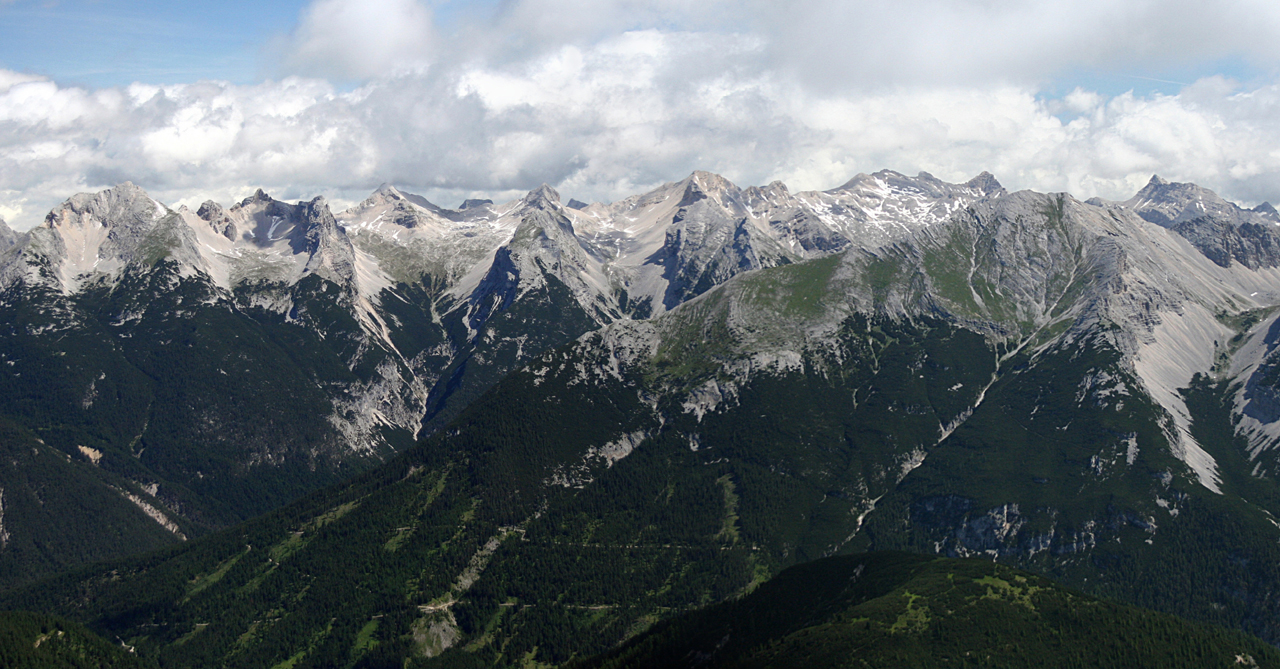
The western Hinterautal-Vomper Chain seen from South from the Erlspitze

== Important summits ==
The mountains in the chain, listed from west to east, are as follows:

- Pleisenspitze (2,569 m (AA))
- Larchetkarspitze (2,541 m (AA))
- Große Riedlkarspitze (2,585 m (AA))
- Breitgrieskarspitze (2,590 m (AA))
- Oberer Spitzhüttenkopf (2,502 m (AA))
- Große Seekarspitze (2,677 m (AA))
- Marxenkarspitze (2,636 m (AA))
- Western Ödkarspitze (2,712 m (AA))
- Middle Ödkarspitze (2,745 m (AA))
- Eastern Ödkarspitze (2,738 m (AA))
- Hochalmkreuz (2,192 m (AA))
- Birkkarspitze (2,749 m (AA))
- Kaltwasserkarspitze (2,733 m (AA))
- Rauhkarlspitze (2,619 m (AA))
- Moserkarspitze (2,533 m (AA))
- Northern Sonnenspitze (2,650 m (AA))
- Southern Sonnenspitze (2,668 m (AA))
- Laliderer Spitze (2,588 m (AA))
- Dreizinkenspitze (2,603 m (AA))
- Grubenkarspitze (2,663 m (AA))
- Rossloch crest (Rosslochkamm)
  - Sunntigerspitze (2,321 m (AA))
  - Hallerangerspitze (2,442 m (AA))
  - Gamskarspitze (2,601 m (AA))
  - Brantlspitze (2,626 m (AA))
  - Hochkanzel (2,574 m (AA))
  - Rosslochspitze (2,538 m (AA))
- Spritzkarspitze (2,606 m (AA))
- Spitzkarlspitze (2,376 m (AA))
- Eiskarlspitze (2,610 m (AA))
- Hochglück (2,573 m (AA))
- Huderbankspitze (2,319 m (AA))
- Barthspitze (2,454 m (AA)), named after Hermann von Barth, the "Explorer of the Karwendel"
- Schafkarspitze (2,505 m (AA))
- Mitterkarlspitze (2,418 m (AA))
- Lamsenspitze (2,508 m (AA))
- Rotwandlspitze (2,322 m (AA))
- Steinkarlspitze (2,460 m (AA))
- Hochnissl (2,547 m (AA))
- Schneekopf (2,313 m (AA))
- Mittagspitze (2,332 m (AA))
- Fiechter Spitze (2,299 m (AA))
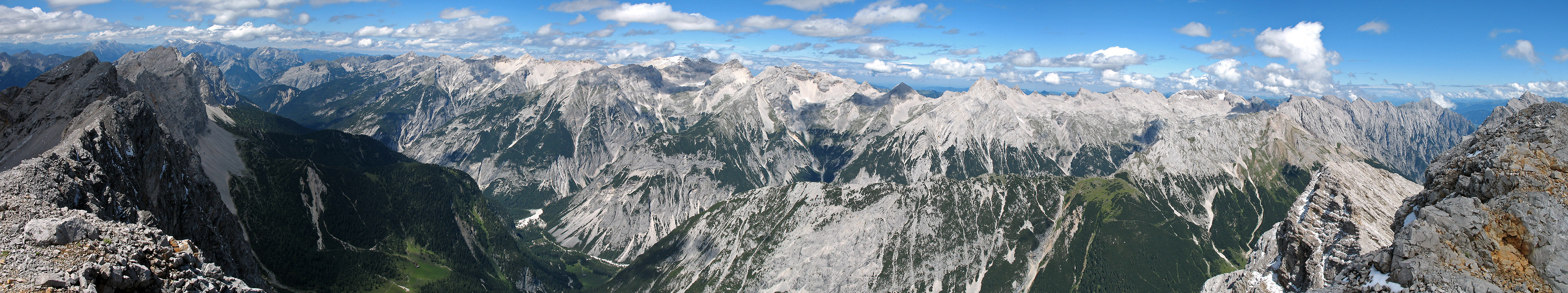
The Hinterautal-Vomper Chain from the Großer Lafatscher
