= Northern Karwendel Chain =

Mountain chain in the Karwendel in the Alps

Nördliche Karwendelkette
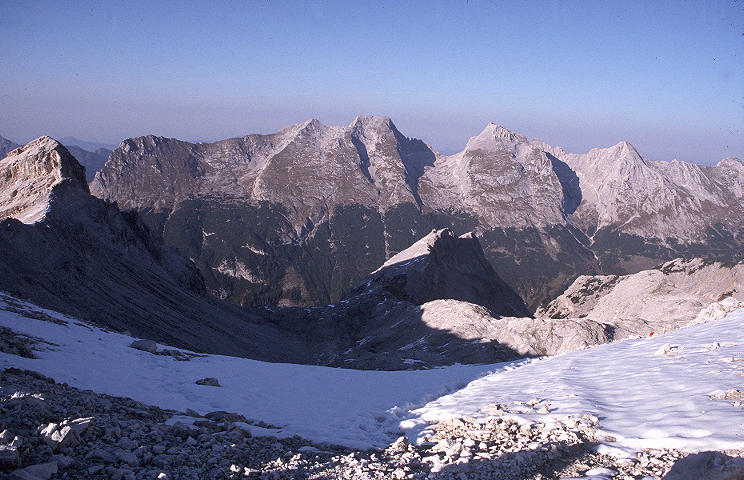
- The Northern Karwendel Chain with the Bäralplkopf, Schlichtenkarspitze, Vogelkarspitze, Östlicher Karwendelspitze, Grabenkarspitze, Lackenkarkopf and Kuhkopf (from the Seekarscharte to south in the Hinterautal-Vomper Chain)

Highest point
- Peak: Eastern Karwendelspitze
- Elevation: 2,537 m above sea level (AA)

Geography
- Location within Austria Location within Bavaria
- Location: Tyrol, Austria / Bavaria, Germany
- Range coordinates: 47°27′N 11°22′E
- Parent range: Karwendels

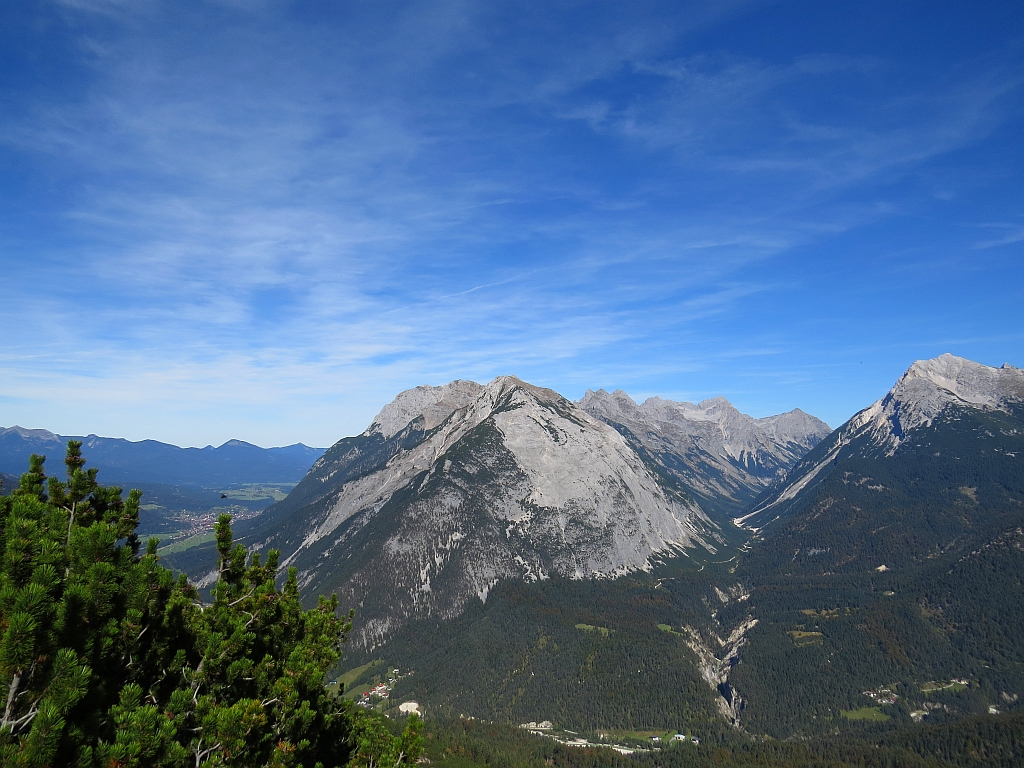
The Northern Karwendel Chain from the Zäunlkopf in the Erlspitze Group to the south

The Northern Karwendel Chain (German: Nördliche Karwendelkette) is the northernmost of the four great, largely parallel mountain chains in the Karwendel in the Alps. It is made from very pure Wetterstein limestone, which has its heart in the Karwendel and runs for a total length of c. 18 kilometres from Scharnitz in the northeast via Mittenwald to the Wörner, where it turns sharply east, until it finally ends west of the Johannestal valley. It has 25 main summits with an average height of 2,400 m. The highest peak is the Eastern Karwendelspitze (2,537 m (AA)). The boundary between Germany and Austria runs along the crest from the Brunnensteinspitze in the west to the Eastern Karwendelspitze in the east. The northwestern side is Bavarian, the southeastern flank is Tyrolean. The Northern Karwendel Chain should not be confused with the southernmost chain of the Karwendel, the Inn Valley Chain, which is known colloquially as the Nordkette or "North Chain" due to its location north of the city of Innsbruck.

The southwestern part is sharply divided by cirques into side ridges (most clearly in the Dammkar cirque), while the eastern part presents a very consistent rock face. A little to the east of its centre point, the chain is interrupted by a very marked saddle, the Bäralpl, which is about 1 kilometres wide and 500 metres deep, a broad plateau which provides the only easy crossing from the Soiern Group north of the range into the Karwendeltal and to the next mountain chain in the Karwendel, the Hinterautal-Vomper Chain.

== Important summits ==
The most important summits of the Northern Karwendel Chain, following the course of the chain from west to northeast and east, are the:

- Brunnensteinspitze (2,180 m (AA))
- Rotwandlspitze (2,191 m above sea level (AA))
- Kirchlspitze (2,301 m above sea level (AA))
- Sulzleklammspitze (2,321 m above sea level (AA))
- Southern Linderspitze (2,305 m above sea level (AA))
- Gerberkreuz (2,305 m above sea level (NHN))
- Northern Linderspitze (2,372 m above sea level (AA))
- Viererspitze (2,054 m above NHN)
- Western Karwendelspitze (2,385 m above sea level (AA))
- Western Larchetfleckspitze (Lärchfleckspitze) (2,352 m above sea level (AA)),
- Eastern Larchetfleckspitze (Lärchfleckspitze) (2,362 m above sea level (AA))
- Tiefkarspitze (2,430 m above sea level (AA))
- Schönbergspitze (2,294 m above sea level (AA))
- Südliche Großkarspitze (2,289 m above sea level (AA))
- Mittlere Großkarspitze (2,361 m above sea level (AA))
- Nördliche Großkarspitze (2,420 m above sea level (AA))
- Wörner (2,474 m above sea level (AA))
- Hochkarspitze (2,482 m above sea level (AA))
- Raffelspitze (2,323 m above sea level (AA))
- Bäralplkopf (2,323 m above sea level (AA))
- Vordere Schlichtenkarspitze (2,356 m above sea level (AA))
- Hintere Schlichtenkarspitze (2,473 m above sea level (AA))
- Vogelkarspitze (2,522 m above sea level (AA))
- Eastern Karwendelspitze (2,537 m above sea level (AA))
- Grabenkarspitze (2,471 m above sea level (AA))
- Lackenkarkopf (2,416 m above sea level (AA))
- Kuhkopf (2,399 m above sea level (AA))
- Talelespitze (2,104 m above sea level (AA))
- Southern Stuhlkopf (2,049 m above sea level (AA))
- Northern Stuhlkopf (2,015 m above sea level (AA))
