= Kaltwasserkarspitze =

Mountain in Austria

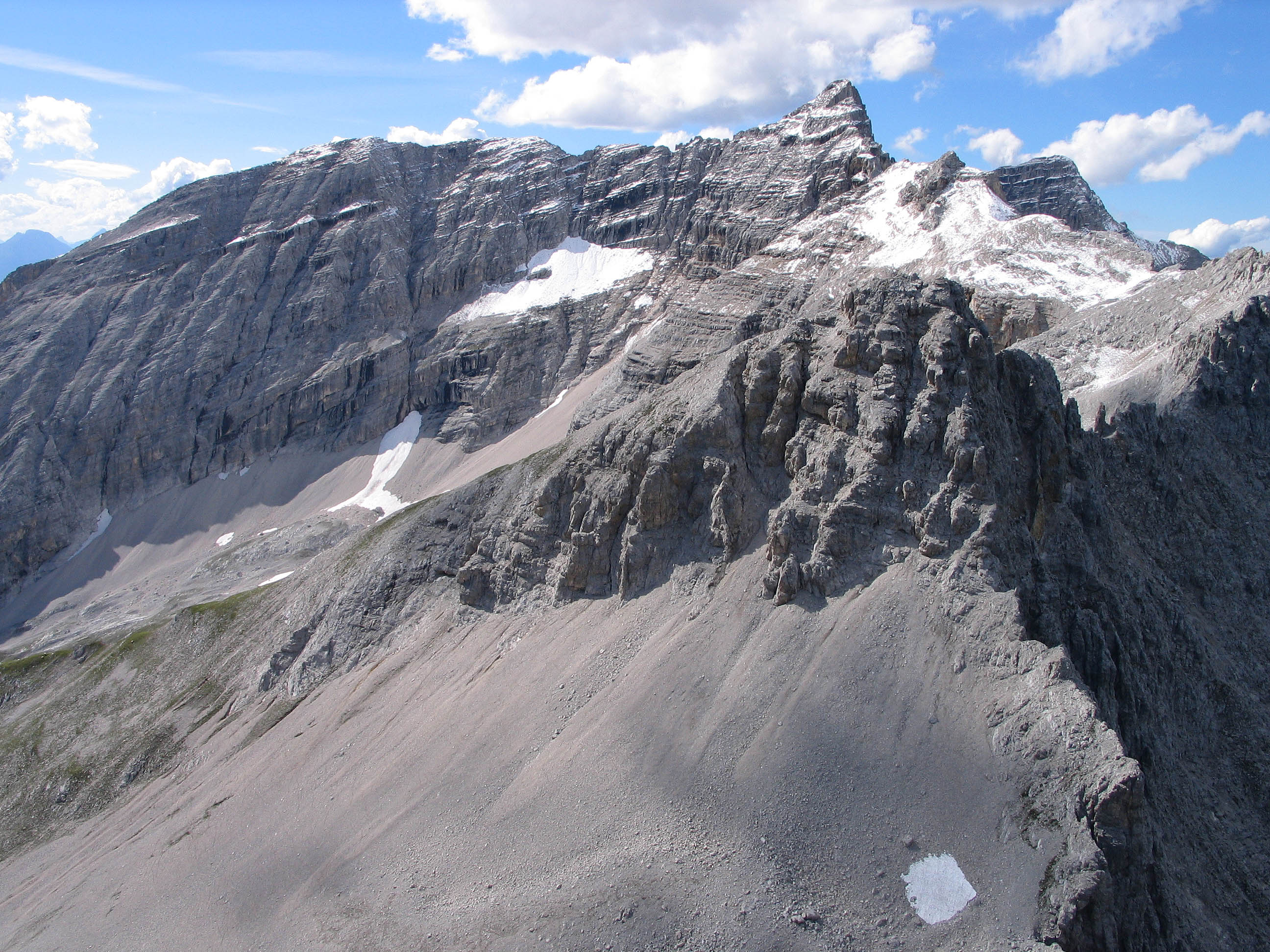
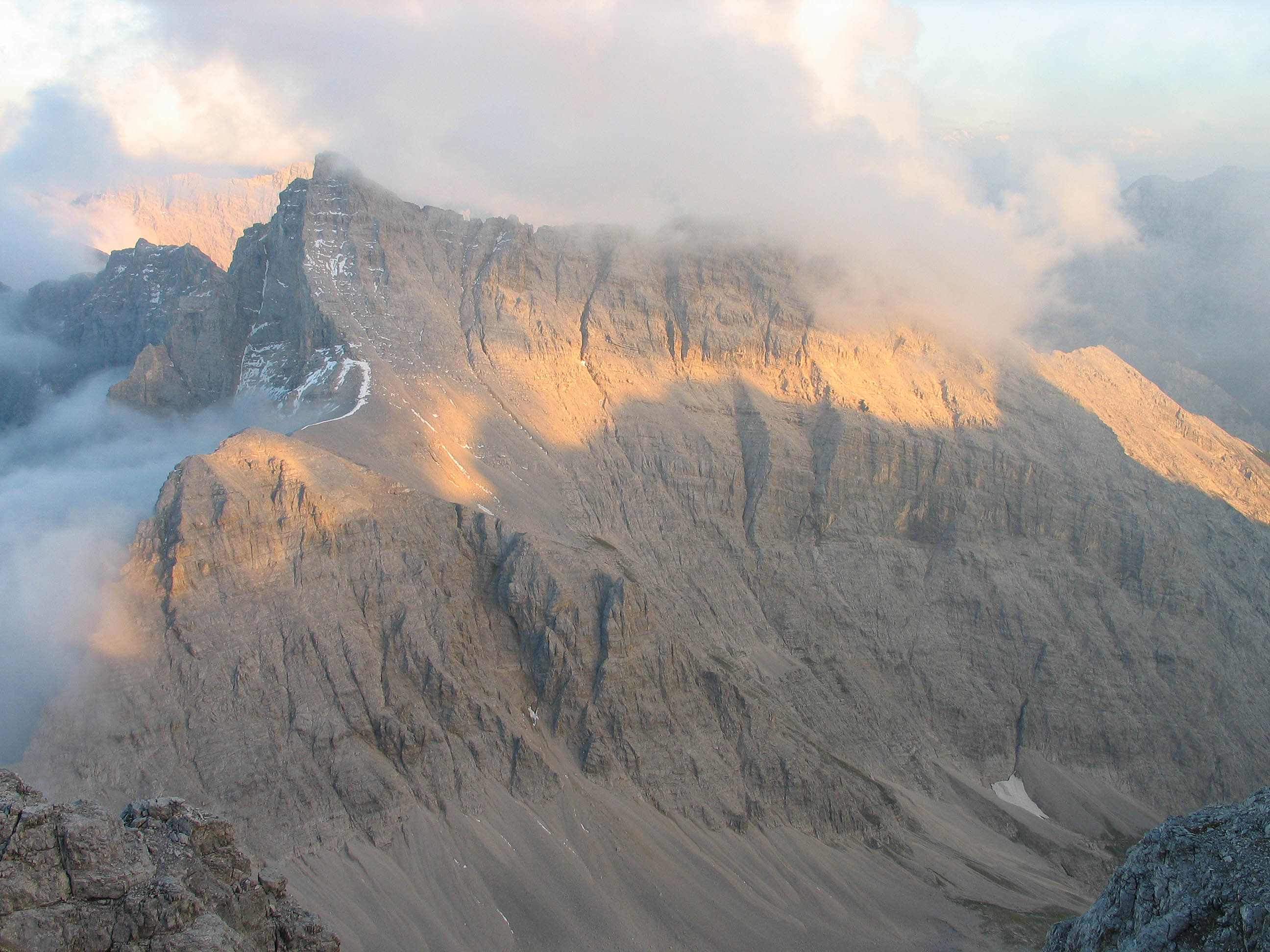
- The Kaltwasserkarspitze from the east The Kaltwasserkarspitze from the Birkkarspitze

Highest point
- Elevation: 2,733 m (AA) (8,967 ft)
- Prominence: 2,733-2,413 m ↓ Hochjöchl
- Isolation: 1.3 km → Birkkarspitze
- Coordinates: 47°24′10″N 11°27′02″E

Geography
- Location within Austria
- Location: Tyrol, Austria
- Parent range: Hinterautal-Vomper Chain, Karwendel

Climbing
- First ascent: 15 August 1870 by Hermann von Barth
- Normal route: Scharnitz – Kastenalm – south arête (II)

The Kaltwasserkarspitze is a mountain in the Hinterautal-Vomper Chain and, at 2,733 m (AA) m, is the fourth highest peak in the Karwendel mountains in Austria after the Birkkarspitze, Middle and Eastern Ödkarspitze. The Kaltwasserkarspitze is the eastern neighbour of the Birkkarspitze, its rugged summit dropping in a steep rock face to the valley of Kleiner Ahornboden. A long arête heads south from the mountain, on which are the Sägezähne ("saw teeth") and the Großer Heißenkopf (2,431 m (AA)) and which separates the Östliche Birkkar from the Raukarl.

The mountain was first climbed in 1870 by Hermann von Barth.

== Ascent ==
The Kaltwasserkarspitze is not easy to reach. All routes involve sections of UIAA climbing grade II:

- From the Hinterau valley up the south arête, crossing of the Großer Heißenkopf and the Sägezähne
- From the Hinterau valley through the Birkkarklamm gorge and the Östliche Birkkar
- From Karwendelhaus via the Hochjöchl saddle (2,413 m (AA))
- From Kleiner Ahornboden via the Sauissköpfl, Western Moserkarscharte col and through the Raukarl to the south arête
