= Linderspitzen =

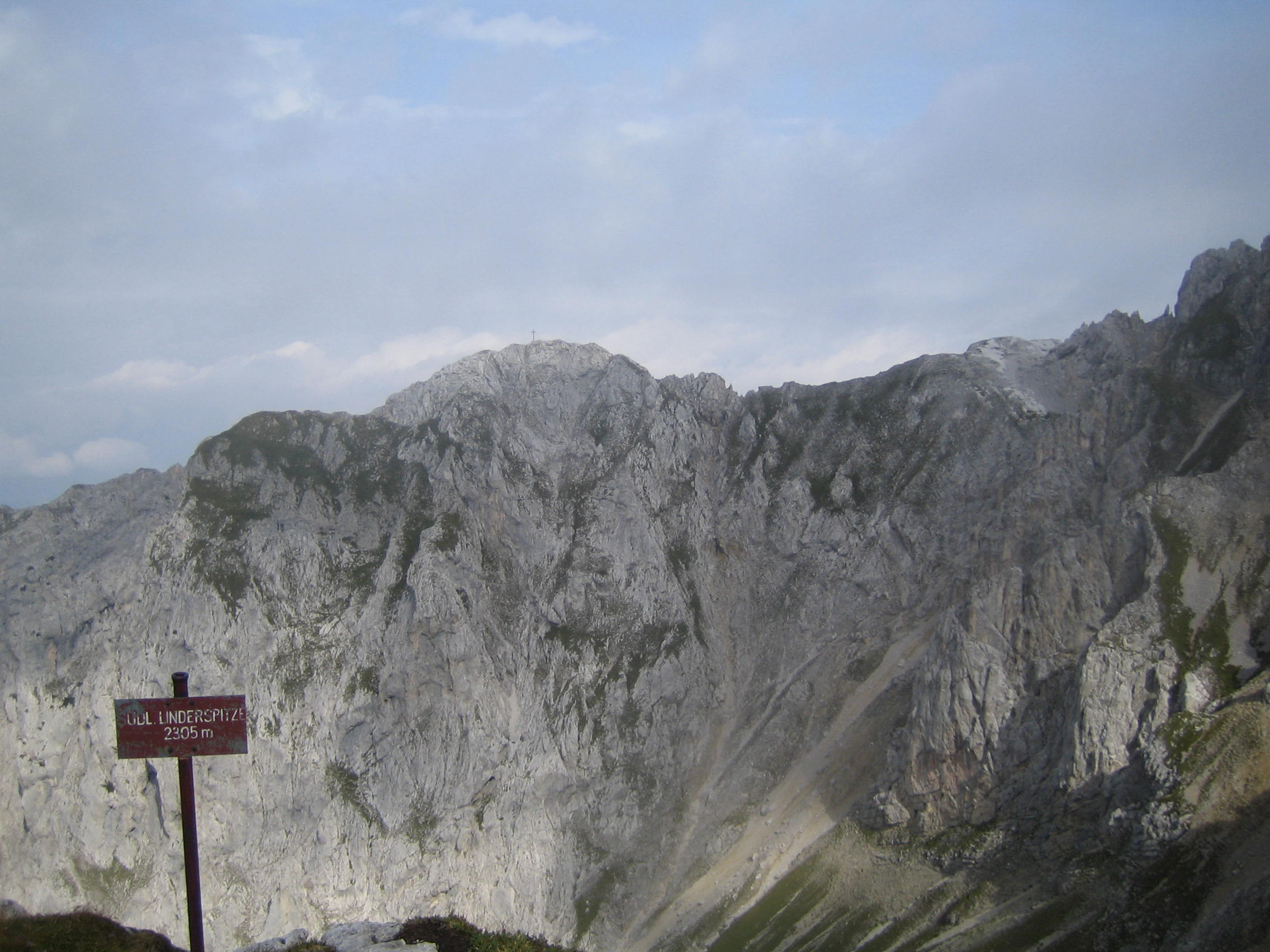
- Summit of the Südliche Linderspitze (Southern Linderspitze)

Highest point
- Elevation: 2,372 m (7,782 ft)
- Coordinates: 47°25′32″N 11°17′27″E

Geography
- Location within Austria
- Location: Tyrol, Austria and Bavaria, Germany
- Parent range: Alps, Karwendel

Climbing
- Easiest route: Via Ferrata

The Linderspitzen are three summits of the Karwendel range at the border between the Austrian state of Tyrol and the German state of Bavaria. Linderspitzen refers to three distinct peaks, the Northern Linderspitze (2372 m), the Southern Linderspitze (2305 m) and the Middle Linderspitze (2239 m).

== Climbing ==
The Linderspitzen form part of the Northern Karwendel Chain which divides the Isar Valley to the west from the Karwendel Valley to the east. Closest city is Mittenwald. Next closest peak in the range is the Westliche Karwendelspitze.

There is an easy Via Ferrata passing over the part of the Karwendel Range and the Linderspitzen, the so-called Mittenwalder Höhenweg ("Mittenwald Ridgeway"), also the easiest access to the peaks.
