= Hochkarspitze =

Mountain on the border between Germany and Austria

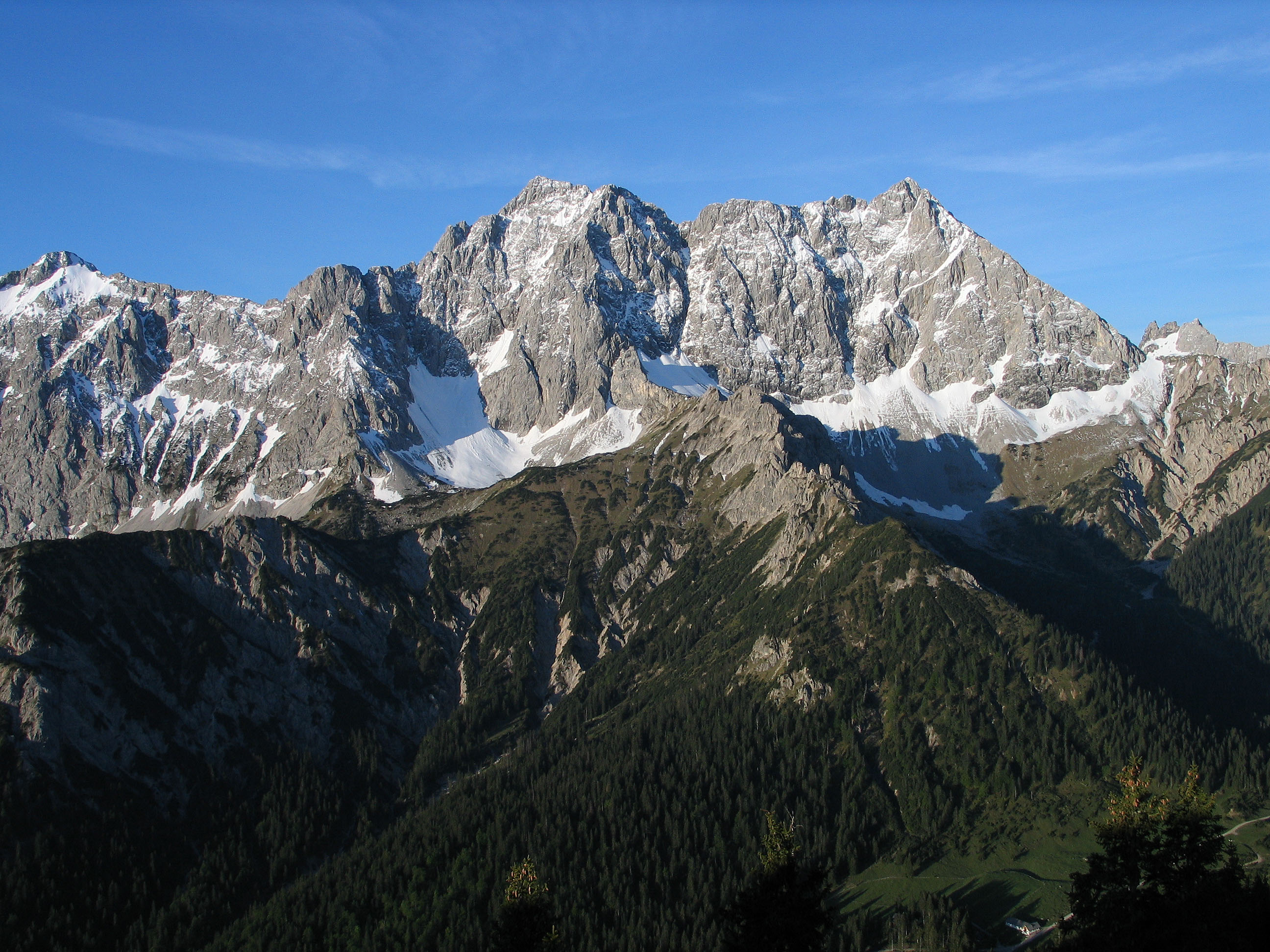
- The Hochkarspitze (l) and Wörner (r, 2,476 m) from the north

Highest point
- Elevation: 2,484 m above sea level (NN) (8,150 ft)
- Prominence: 662
- Coordinates: 47°26′51″N 11°21′00″E

Geography
- Location within Bavaria
- Location: Bavaria, Germany / Tyrol, Austria
- Parent range: Karwendel

Climbing
- First ascent: 1870 by Hermann von Barth
- Easiest route: Scharnitz – Larchet Alm – Großkar – Hochkarspitze (mountain tour with long climbing sections)

The Hochkarspitze is a 2,484 m high mountain in the Karwendel on the border between Bavaria and Tyrol. It is part of the Northern Karwendel Chain, which runs initially northwards before swinging east at the Wörner. The Hochkarspitze lies east of the Wörner summit and is the highest point of the massif that it forms jointly with the Wörner.

The Hochkarspitze may be climbed in a difficult mountain tour from the south, partly over trackless terrain (sure-footedness and a head for heights are required).
