= Mahnkopf =

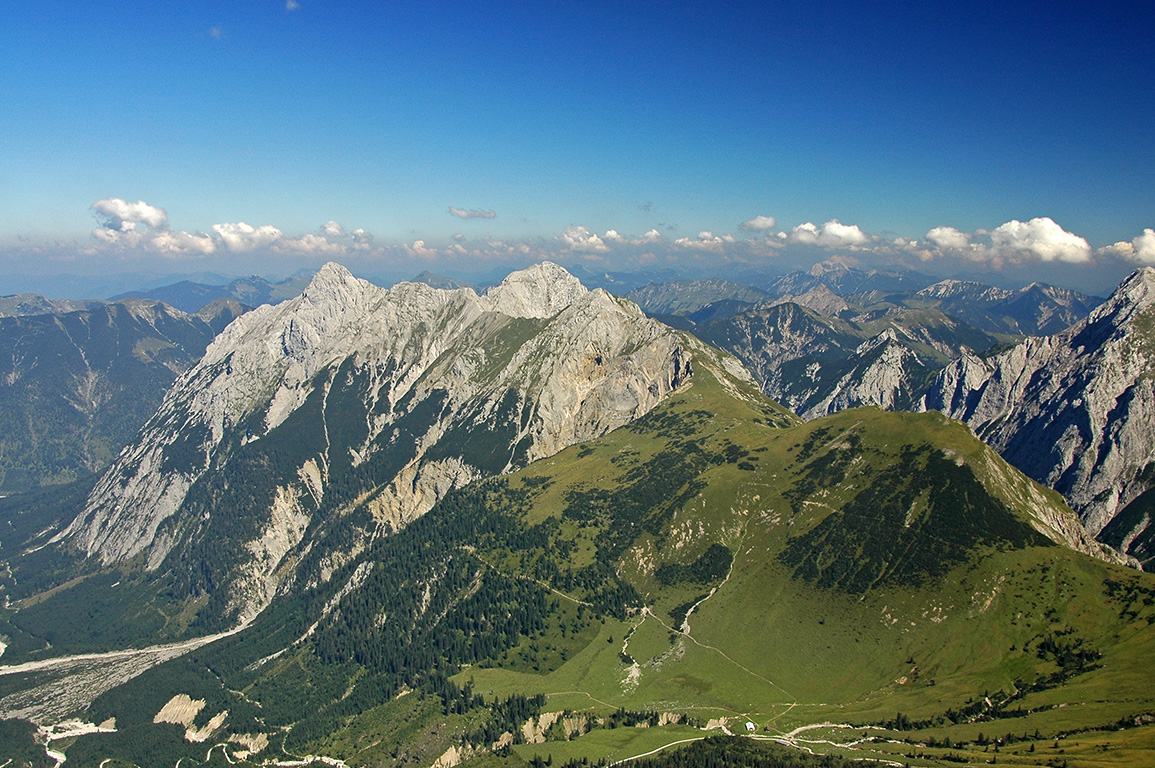
- Falken Group from south-west with Mahnkopf to the right

Highest point
- Elevation: 2,094 m (6,870 ft)
- Coordinates: 47°24′44″N 11°30′28″E

Geography
- Location within Austria
- Location: Tyrol, Austria
- Parent range: Alps, Karwendel

Climbing
- Easiest route: alpine hike

Mahnkopf (elevation 2,094 m (6,870 ft)) is a summit in the Falken Group, a subgroup of the Karwendel range in the Austrian state of Tyrol.

== Alpinism ==
The Mahnkopf is the only peak in the Falken Group that can be reached as a normal alpine hike, e.g. from the hut Falkenhütte, followed by the Steinfalk (UIAA I).
