= Schaufelspitze =

Schaufelspitze is the name of the following mountains in Austria:

- Schaufelspitze (Stubai Alps), 3,332 m
- Schaufelspitze (Karwendel), 2,306 m
