= Wörner (Alps) =

Mountain on the border of Austria and Germany

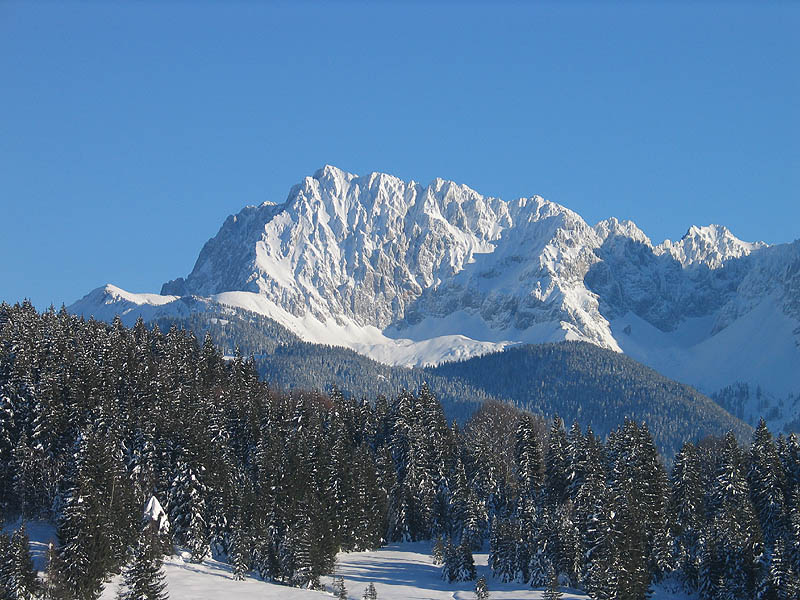
- The Wörner from the lake of Geroldsee

Highest point
- Elevation: 2,476 m above sea level (NN) (8,123 ft)
- Coordinates: 47°26′59″N 11°20′19″E

Geography
- Location within Bavaria
- Location: Bavaria, Germany / Tyrol, Austria
- Parent range: Karwendel (Northern Karwendel Chain)

Climbing
- First ascent: probably 1853; Hermann von Barth 1870
- Easiest route: Mittenwald – Hochlandhütte – Wörnersattel – Wörner (mountain tour with short climbing sections)

The Wörner is a 2,476 m high mountain in the Karwendel on the border between Bavaria and Tyrol. It is part of the Northern Karwendel Chain that initially runs northwards to the Wörner and then swings east. The northwest ridge (Nordwestgrat) of the Wörner is very striking and easy to make out from many other peaks in the region.

The mountain was probably first climbed from the south (Karwendel valley, Großkar) in 1853 during Austrian triangulation work; but the first recorded ascent was by Hermann von Barth in 1870, also from the south (grade II, brittle, exposed towards the end).

Today the mountain is mostly ascended on its western flank. The normal route starts at the Wörner Saddle (1,989 m), which is reached from Mittenwald via the Hochland Hut (1,623 m) or the Verein Alm (bicycle depot at 1,430 m). There is an initially straightforward, but lengthy and steep climb through rocky terrain. After a crossing at 2,330 m there are several climbing sections (grade II−) and the route is rather exposed in places.

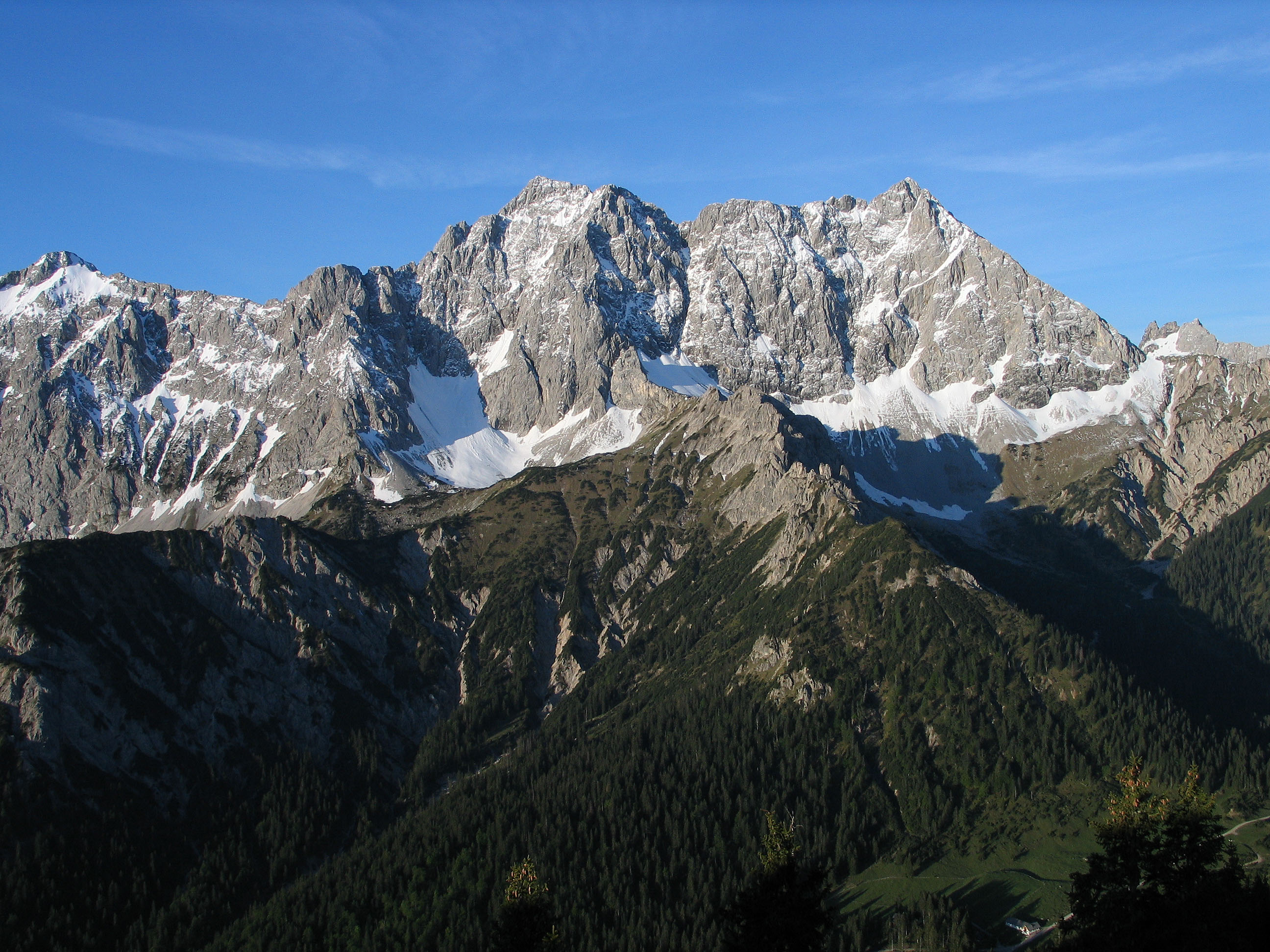
The Hochkarspitze (l, 2484 m) and the Wörner (r) from the north

An entire row of pitons left behind in the rock indicate that in the past, when troops of the Mittenwald mountain infantry passed this way, dangerous climbing sections were secured using rope railings. For a long time the route was only marked by cairns and a few posts, and orientation during the descent was difficult. Since 2002 the route has been marked throughout.

From the summit there is a view over the Karwendel valley and the central Karwendel chain from the Pleisenspitze to the Birkkarspitze; close by to the north are the Schöttelkarspitze and Soiernspitze; this panorama in the foreground severely restricts the long-distance view.

On 9 July 1985 the then defence minister, Manfred Wörner, accompanied by Army mountain leaders (Heeresbergführer) from Mittenwald climbed the mountain that shares his name.
