= Karwendel =

Mountain range of the Northern Limestone Alps

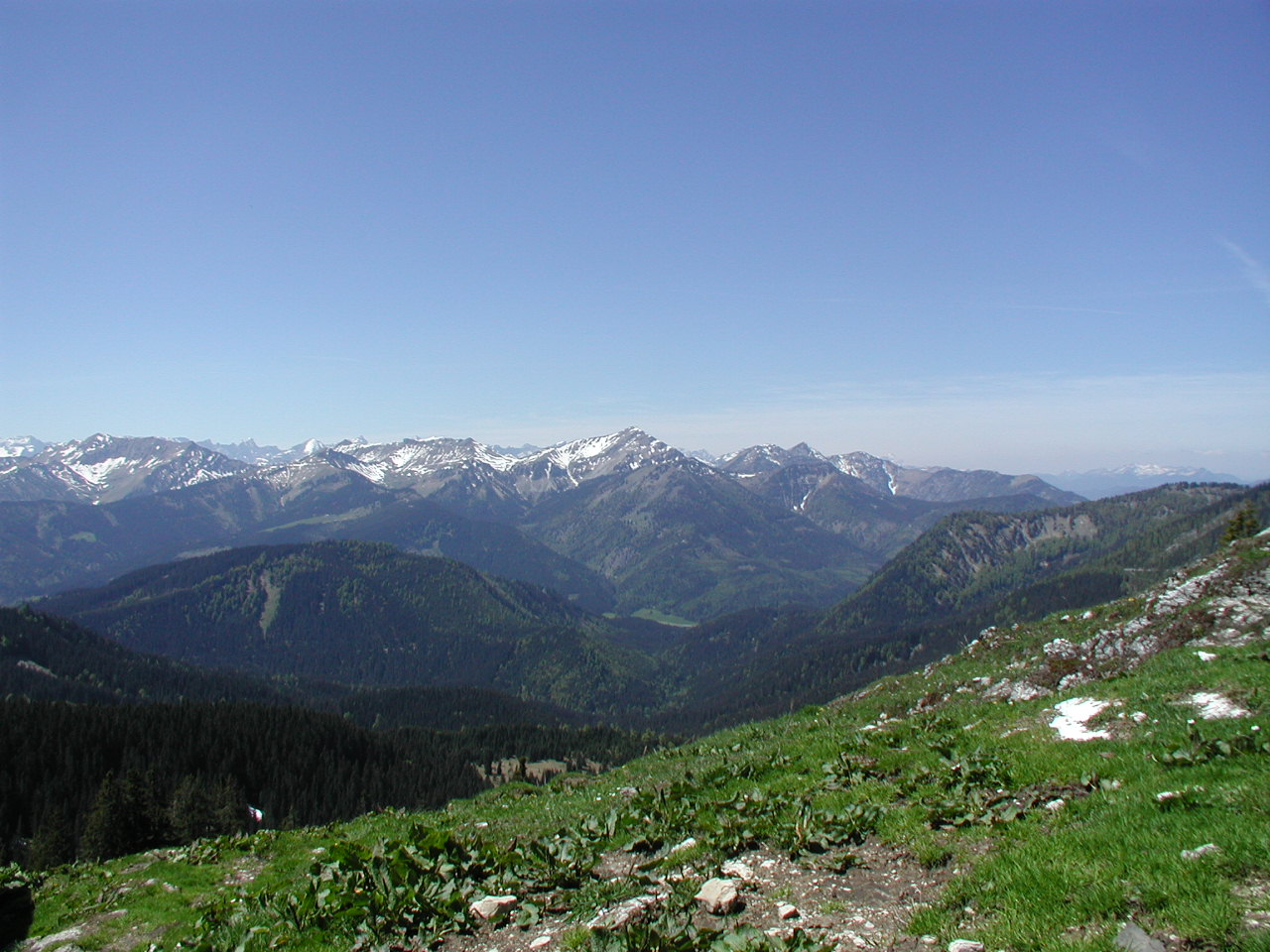
- View of the northeastern part of the Karwendel (Location: Blue Mountains)

Highest point
- Peak: Birkkarspitze
- Elevation: 2,749 m (9,019 ft)
- Coordinates: 47°24′41″N 11°26′15″E

Geography
- Countries: Austria; Germany
- Range coordinates: 47°25′N 11°28′E
- Parent range: Northern Limestone Alps

The Karwendel is the largest mountain range of the Northern Limestone Alps. It is located on the Austria–Germany border. The major part belongs to the Austrian federal state of Tyrol, while the adjacent area in the north is part of Bavaria, Germany. Four chains stretch from west to east; in addition, there are a number of fringe ranges and an extensive promontory (Vorkarwendel) in the north.

== Geography ==
The term Karwendel describes the part of the Alps between the Isar river and the Seefeld Saddle mountain pass in the west and Achen Lake in the east. In the north it stretches to the Bavarian Prealps. In the south the Lower Inn Valley with the city of Innsbruck separates the Karwendel from the Central Eastern Alps. Other major settlements include Seefeld in Tirol and Mittenwald in the west, as well as Eben am Achensee in the east. Neighbouring ranges are the Wetterstein and Mieming Mountains in the west and the Brandenberg Alps in the east.

The mountaineer Hermann von Barth created the tradition of naming the Karwendel chains ranges after the valleys limiting them in the south: Karwendel valley, Hinterau valley and Vomper Loch, Gleirsch valley, Hall valley, and Inn valley:

- Northern Karwendel Chain
- Hinterautal-Vomper Chain (a.k.a. main Karwendel Range),
- Gleirsch-Halltal Chain
- Nordkette (a.k.a. Solstein Range or Inn Valley Range).

Side ranges are the Erlspitze Group, Soiern Group and Vorkarwendel, Falken Group, Gamsjoch Group and Sonnjoch Group.

== Peaks ==
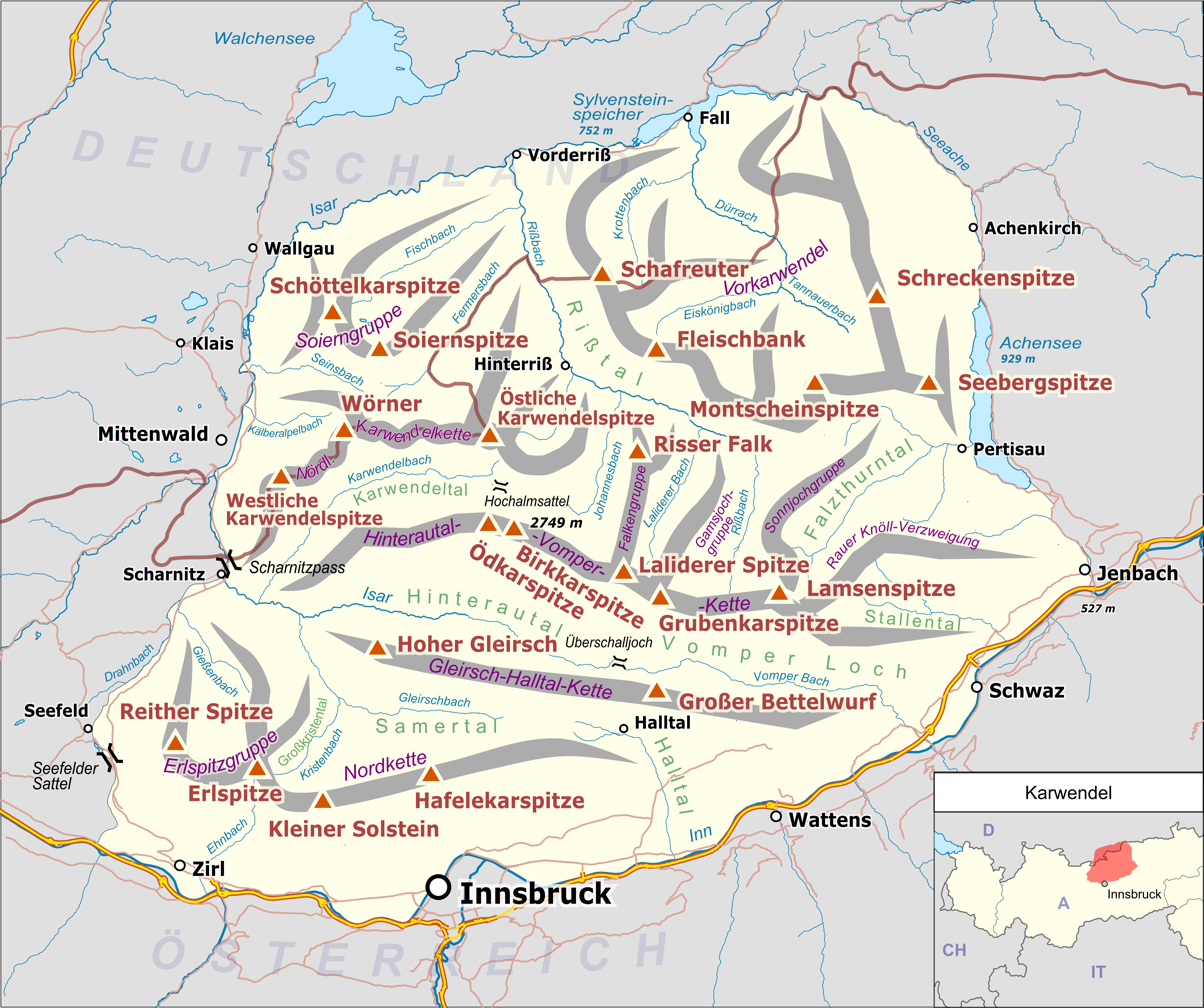
Overview map showing major summits in the Karwendel Alps

There are 125 peaks in the Karwendel that reach heights of over 2,000 metres. The most important are listed below together with some notable peaks between 1,800 and 2,000 metres high.

- Birkkarspitze 2,749 m
- Ödkarspitze, middle top 2,745 m
- Kaltwasserkarspitze 2,733 m
- Großer Bettelwurf 2,725 m
- Großer Lafatscher 2,696 m
- Große Seekarspitze 2,679 m
- Hintere Bachofenspitze 2,668 m
- Grubenkarspitze 2,663 m
- Kleiner Solstein 2,637 m
- Speckkarspitze 2,621 m
- Hintere Brandjochspitze 2,599 m
- Hohe Warte 2,596 m
- Laliderer Spitze 2,583 m
- Jägerkarspitze, south top 2,579 m
- Sonntagkarspitze 2,575 m
- Pleisenspitze 2,567 m
- Vordere Brandjochspitze 2,559 m
- Hochnissl 2,546 m
- Stempeljochspitze 2,543 m
- Großer Solstein 2,540 m
- Östliche Karwendelspitze 2,537 m
- Vogelkarspitze 2,523 m
- Lamsenspitze 2,508 m
- Hoher Gleiersch 2,491 m
- Wörner 2,476 m
- Sonnjoch 2,457 m
- Gamsjoch 2,452 m
- Erlspitze 2,404 m
- Kuhkopf 2,390 m
- Westliche Karwendelspitze 2,385 m
- Steinfalk 2,348 m
- Freiungen, west top, 2,332 m
- Suntiger Spitze 2,321 m
- Schaufelspitze 2,308 m
- Hafelekarspitze 2,269 m
- Soiernspitze 2,257 m
- Rotwandlspitze 2,192 m
- Brunnsteinspitze 2,191 m
- Schafreuter 2,102 m
- Fleischbank 2,026 m
- Grasbergjoch 2,020 m
- Torkopf 2,012 m
- Hölzelstaljoch 2,012 m
- Kompar 2,011 m
- Mondscheinspitze 2,106 m
- Juifen 1,988 m
- Schönalmjoch 1,986 m
- Demeljoch 1,924 m
- Stierjoch 1,908 m
- Dürrnbergjoch 1,835 m

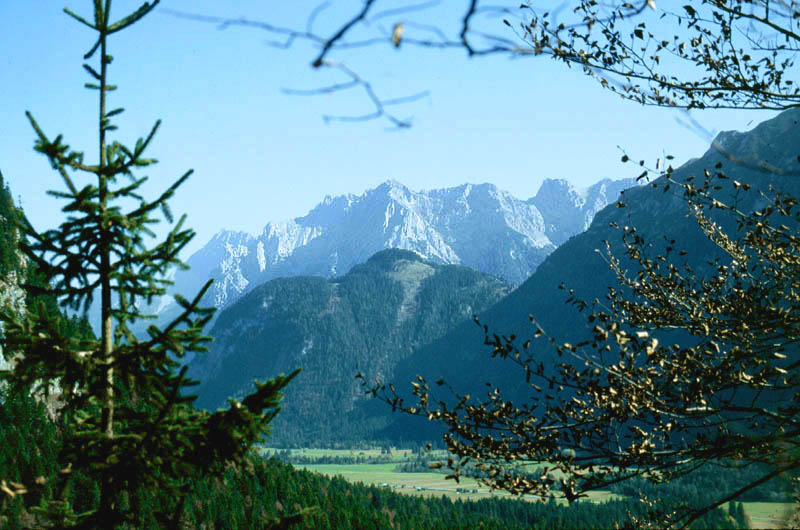
The Northern Karwendel viewed from Wetterstein

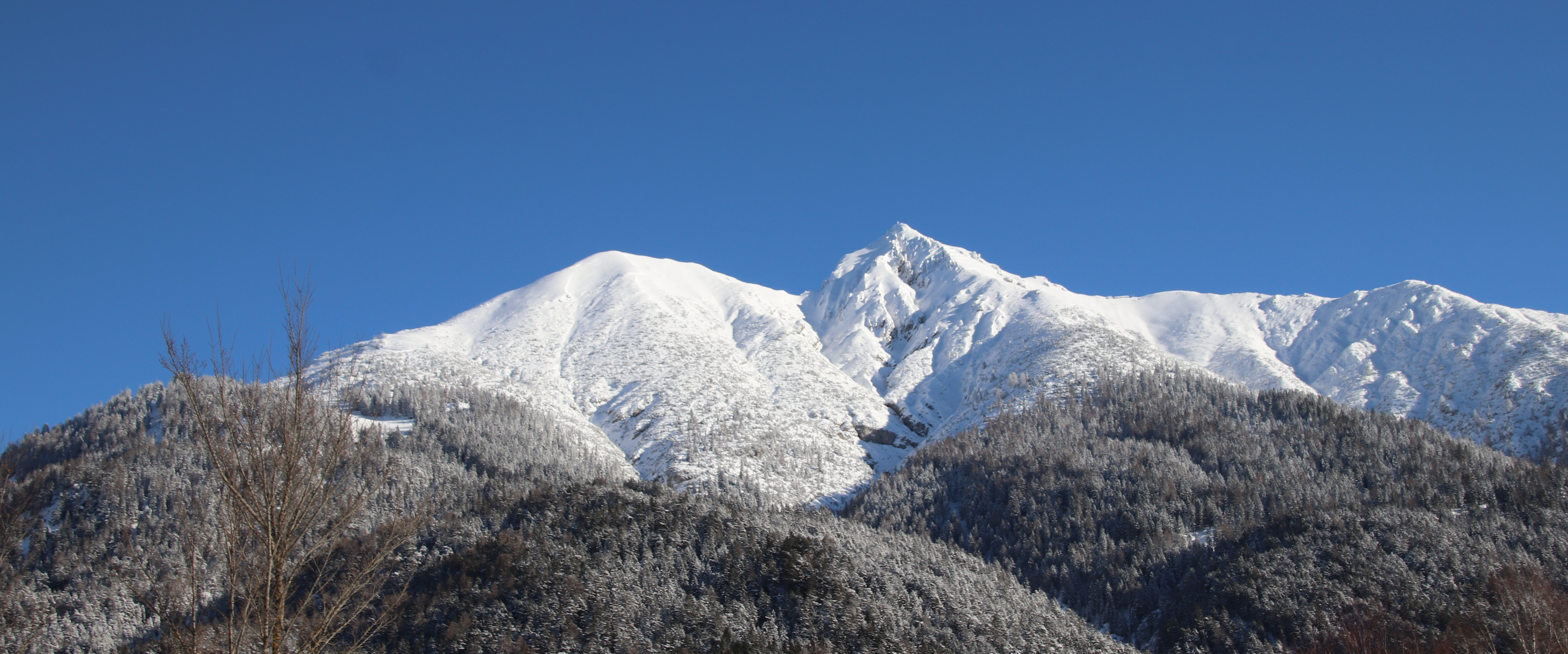
Panorama of the Austrian mountain peaks Härmelekopf and Reither Spitze. viewed from Wildsee, Seefeld, Tirol.

== Alpine huts ==
In the Karwendel, of the 21 Alpine huts, 18 are run by the German or Austrian Alpine Clubs:

- Aspach Hut (OeAV Innsbruck)
- Bettelwurf Hut (OeAV Innsbruck)
- Brunnstein Hut (DAV Mittenwald)
- Dammkar Hut (private)
- Falken Hut (DAV Oberland/Munich)
- Hallerangerhaus (DAV Schwaben)
- Hochland Hut (DAV Hochland/Munich)
- Höttinger Alm (private)
- Karwendelhaus (DAV Männer-Turnverein Munich)
- Krinner Kofler Hut (DAV Mittenwald)
- Lamsenjoch Hut (DAV Oberland/Munich)
- Magdeburger Hut (new) (DAV Geltendorf)
- Mittenwalder Hut (DAV Mittenwald)
- Nördlinger Hut (DAV Nördlingen)
- Pfeis Hut (OeAV Innsbruck)
- Pleisen Hut (private)
- Rotwandl Hut (DAV Neuland/Munich)
- Seewald Hut (DAV Achensee)
- Soiernhaus (DAV Hochland/Munich)
- Solsteinhaus (OeAV Innsbruck)
- Tölzer Hut (DAV Bad Tölz)
