= Schaufelspitze (Karwendel) =

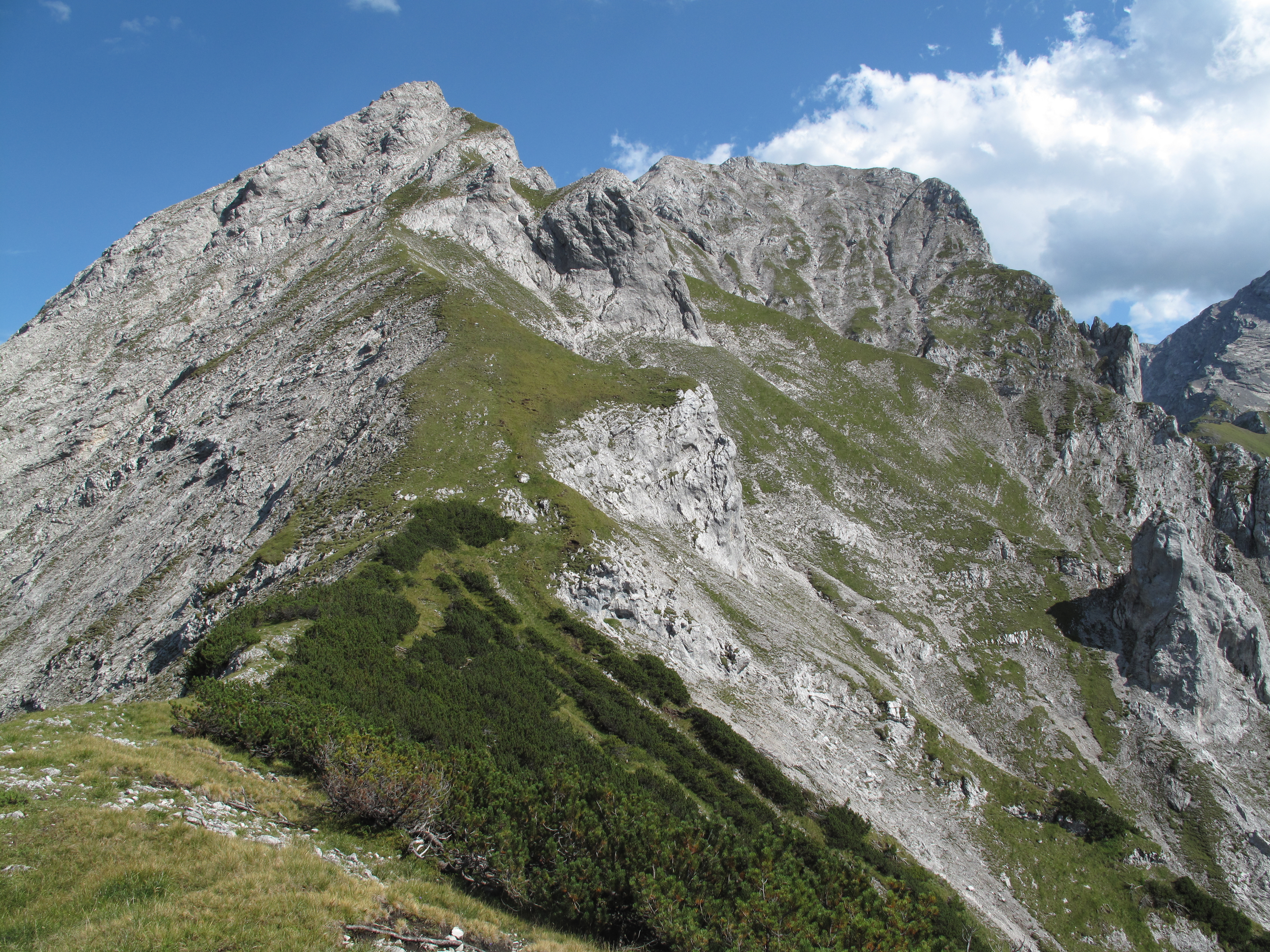
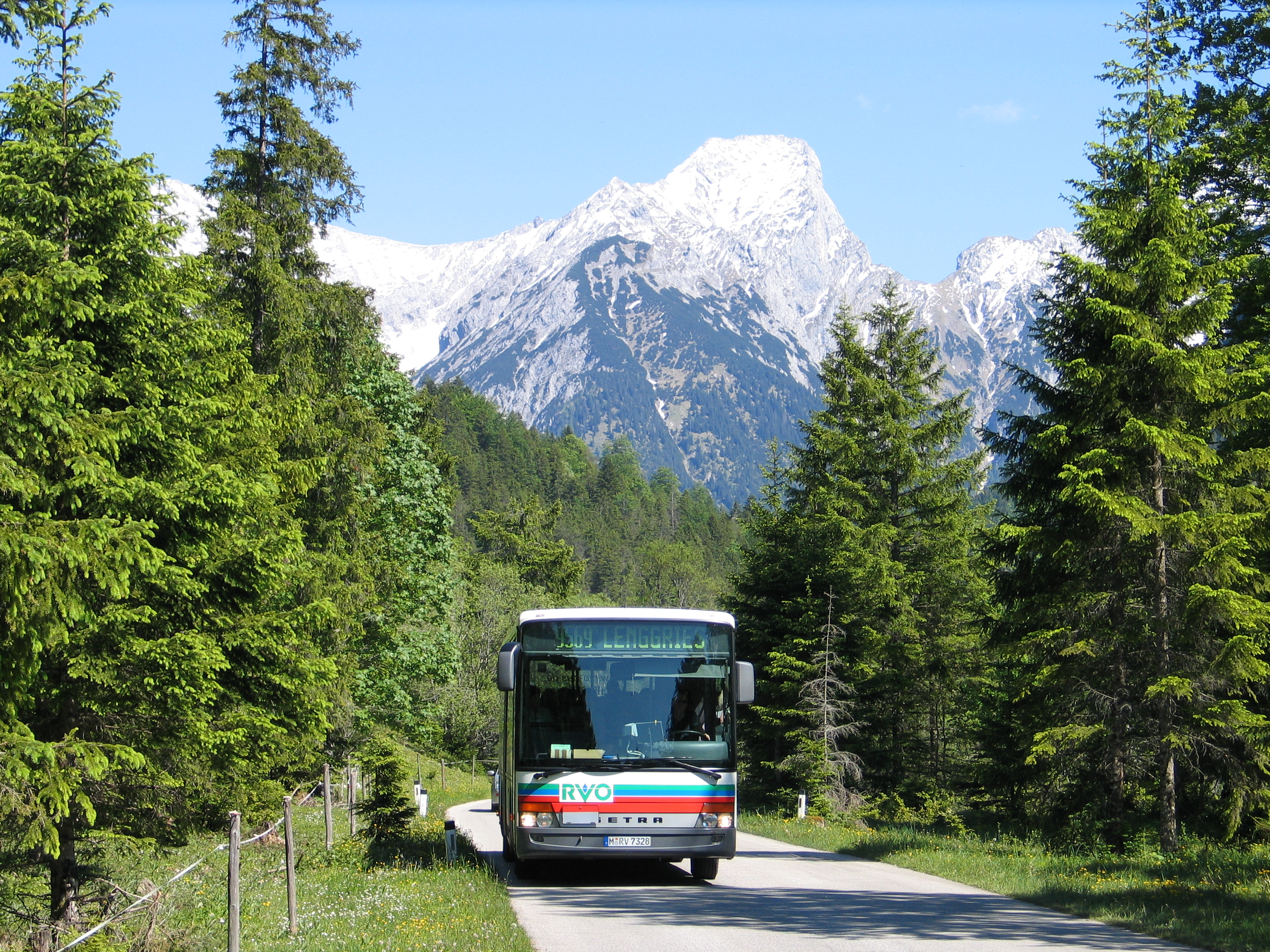
- The summit block of the Schaufelspitze seen from the shoulder of the arête The Schaufelspitze from the Riß valley The Schaufelspitze from the Riß valley

Highest point
- Elevation: 2,306 m (AA) (7,566 ft)
- Prominence: 2,306-1,994 m ↓ Bärenlahner Saddle
- Isolation: 0.9 km → Sonnjoch
- Coordinates: 47°25′23″N 11°36′28″E

Geography
- Location within Austria
- Location: Tyrol, Austria
- Parent range: Sonnjoch Group, Karwendel

Climbing
- Normal route: mountain tour, trackless, in places grade I

The Schaufelspitze is a mountain, 2,306 m (AA) in the Sonnjoch Group in the eastern Karwendel between Sonnjoch and the Bettlerkarspitze.

== Ascents ==
The normal route runs from the Hagelhütten (1,077 m above sea level (AA)) in the Rißtal to the top. It is unmarked and not easy to find, especially in the latschen zone. It has places that require grade I (UIAA) climbing.

A crossing to the Bettlerkarspitze is possible along the arête to the northeast (II).

== Literature ==
- Walter Klier: Alpenvereinsführer Karwendel alpin; Bergverlag Rother, Munich; 15th edn., 2005; ISBN 3-7633-1121-1
- Alpine Club map 5/3 Karwendelgebirge, eastern sheet
