= Stierjoch =

Mountain in Tyrol, Austria and Bavaria, Germany

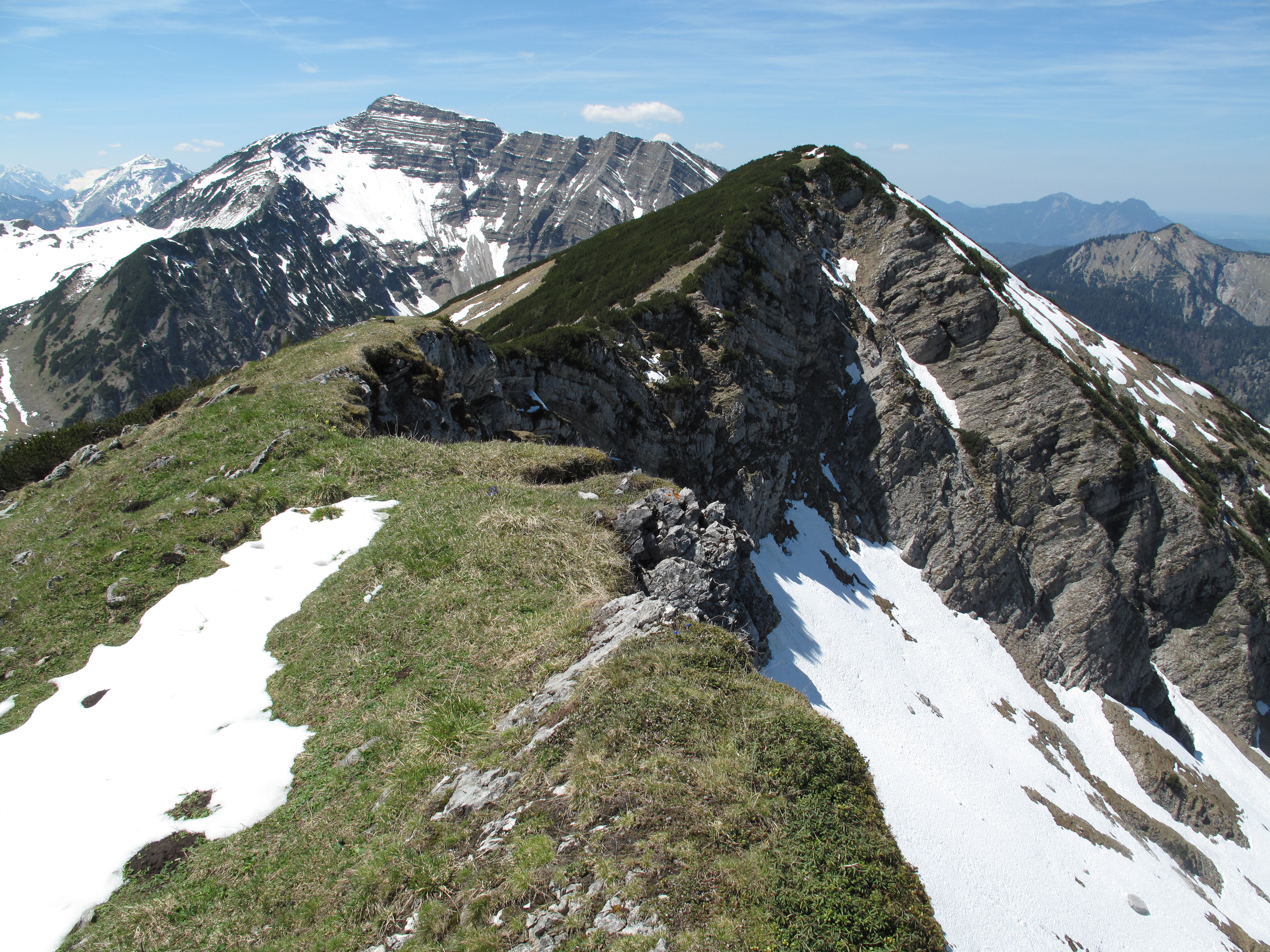
- Stierjoch from east, in the background Schafreuter

Highest point
- Elevation: 1,908 m (6,260 ft)DE-NN
- Coordinates: 47°30′40″N 11°31′07″E

Geography
- Location: Bavaria, Germany
- Parent range: Karwendel

Climbing
- Easiest route: Fall – Lerchkogel Nieder- / Hochleger - Torjoch - Stierjoch

Stierjoch is a mountain at the border of Bavaria, Germany with Tyrol, Austria. The climb is easy, but long.
