= Steinfalk =

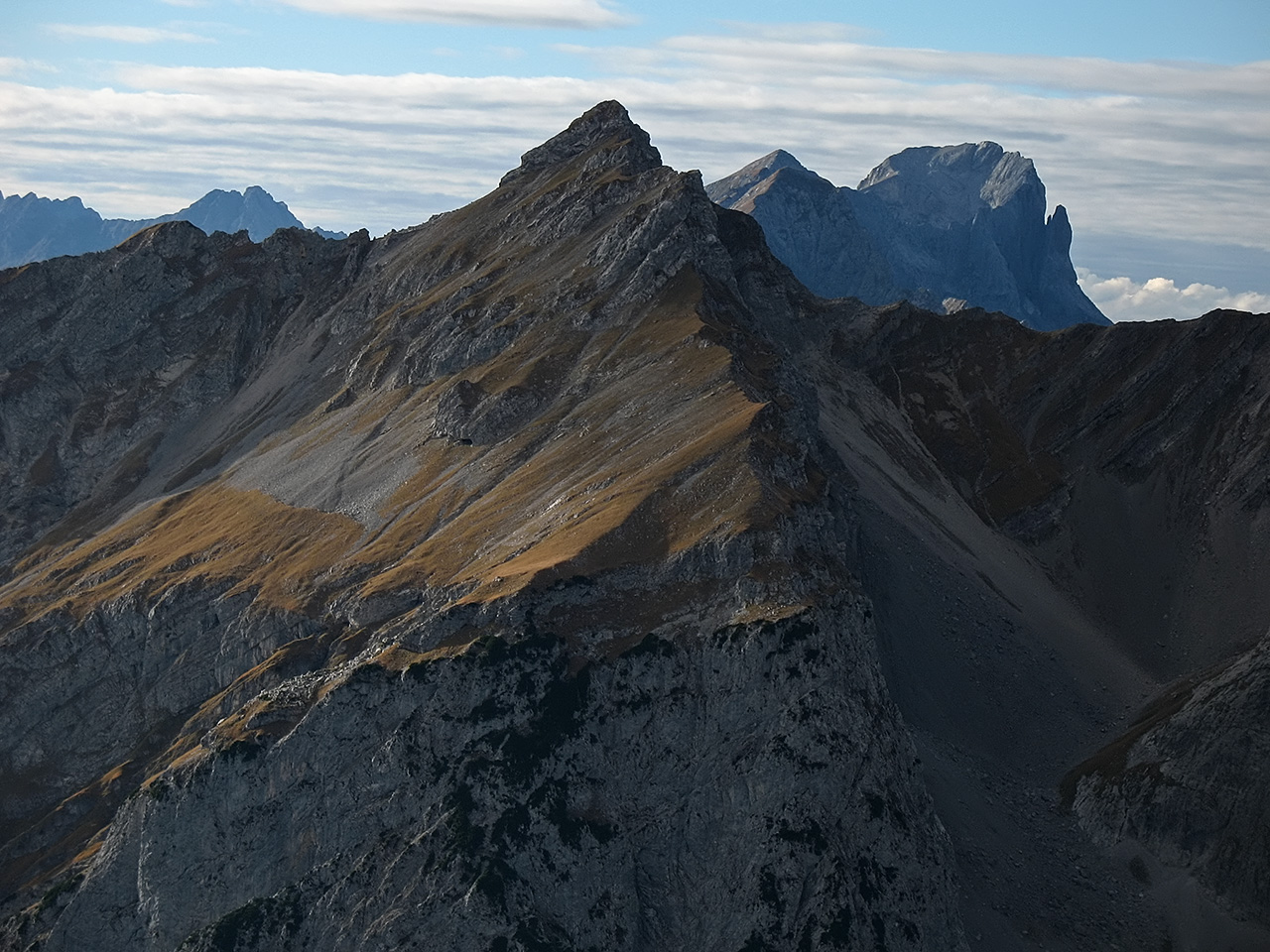
- Steinfalk (eastern side) with Östliche Karwendelspitze in the background

Highest point
- Elevation: 2,347 m (7,700 ft)
- Coordinates: 47°25′38″N 11°30′44″E

Geography
- Location within Austria
- Location: Tyrol, Austria
- Parent range: Alps, Karwendel

Climbing
- First ascent: Hermann von Barth, June 30, 1870
- Easiest route: alpine hike (UIAA I)

Steinfalk (German: Stone Halcon) (elevation 2,347 m [7,700 ft]) is a summit in the Falken Group, a subgroup of the Karwendel range in the Austrian state of Tyrol.

== Alpinism ==
The Steinfalk can be reached from the Eng Valley passing the Falken Hut (Falkenhütte) as an alpine hike with some climbing parts (UIAA I). It is the only peak in the Falken Group with relatively easy access (except normal alpine hike to Mahnkopf).
