= Juifen =

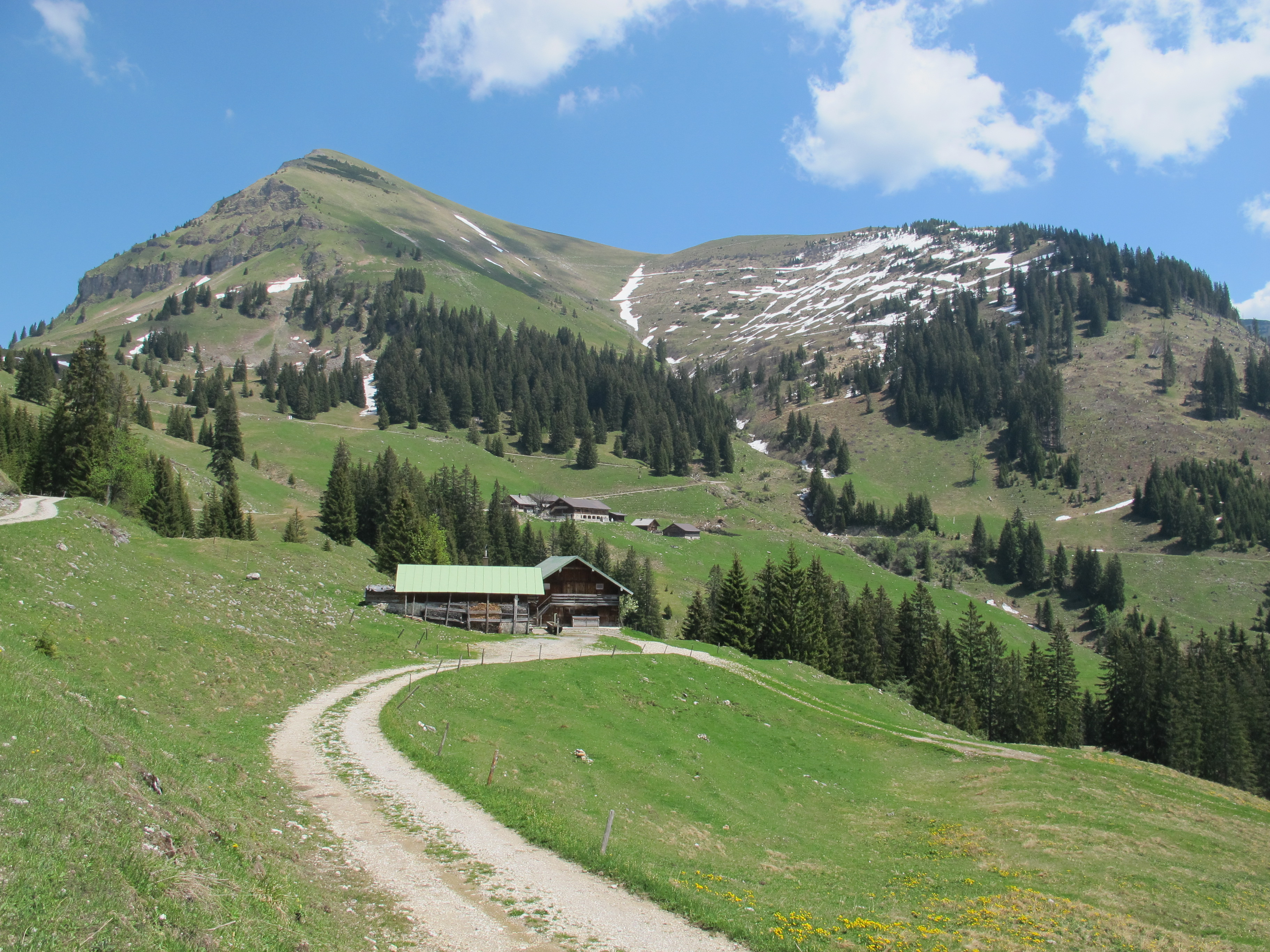
- Juifen from South-East

Highest point
- Elevation: 1,988 m (6,522 ft)
- Coordinates: 47°32′36″N 11°37′33″E

Geography
- Location within Austria
- Location: Tyrol, Austria
- Parent range: Alps, Karwendel

Climbing
- Easiest route: alpine hike

Juifen (elevation 1,988 m (6,522 ft)) is a summit of the Karwendel range in the Austrian state of Tyrol.

== Alpinism ==
The Juifen is one of the most prominent peaks in the Pre-Karwendel range. The summit can be reached from Sylvenstein Dam as an alpine hike and is also a common destination in winter for ski tours or snow shoes. Mountain-bikers can get relatively close to the summit starting either from the Bächen Valley (Bächental) or from the Achen Valley (Achental), passing by the Rotwand Alp (Rotwandalm) on the western slopes.
