= Mondscheinspitze =

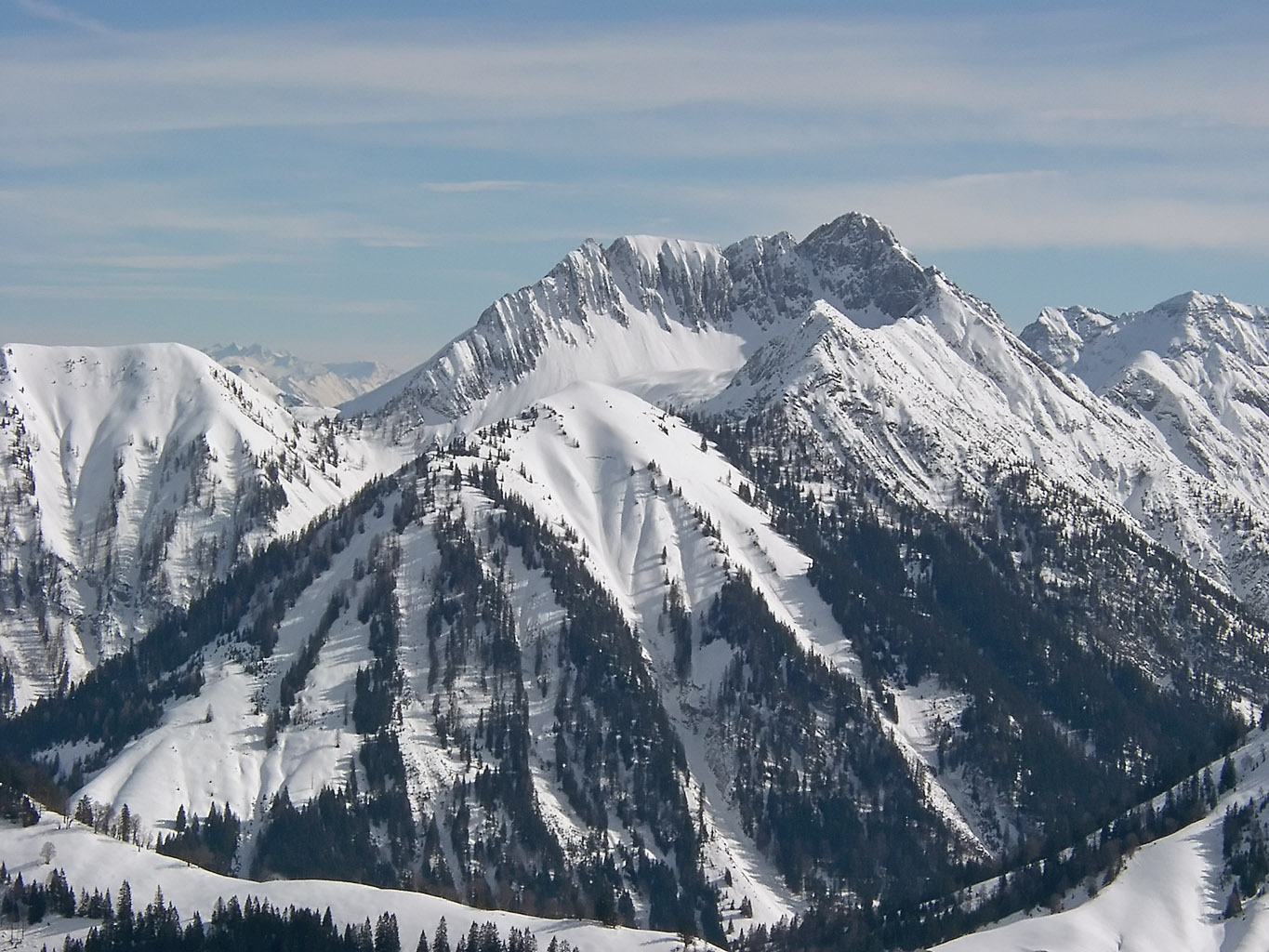
- Mondscheinspitze in wintertime

Highest point
- Elevation: 2,106 m (6,909 ft)
- Coordinates: 47°28′0″N 11°36′49″E

Geography
- Location within Austria
- Location: Tyrol, Austria
- Parent range: Alps, Karwendel

Climbing
- Easiest route: rock climb

Mondscheinspitze is a summit of the Karwendel range in the Austrian state of Tyrol.

Though the name could be translated as Moonshine Peak, Mond originates from romance monticinu, which means small mountain meadow.

== Climbing ==
The Mondscheinspitze is the highest mountain in the Pre-Karwendel range. The summit can be reached from the Eng valley from the west or from the east from Pertisau. Both routes require alpine experience and are rated I or II by the alpine scale.
