= Sonnjoch =

Mountain in Tyrol, Austria

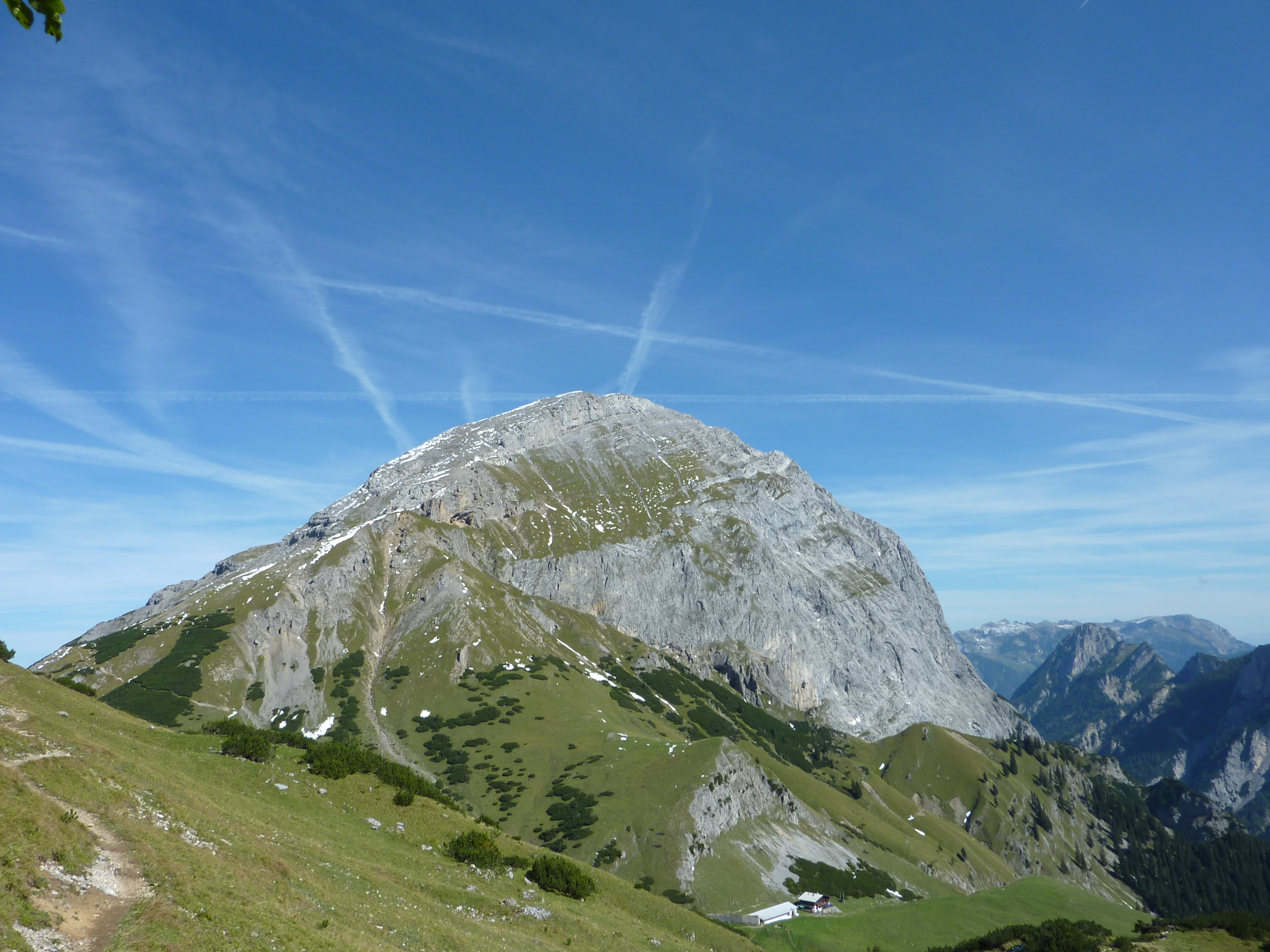
- Sonnjoch

Highest point
- Elevation: 2,457 m (8,061 ft)
- Prominence: 625 m (2,051 ft)
- Coordinates: 47°25′N 11°36′E

Geography
- Location within Alps
- Location: Tyrol, Austria
- Parent range: Karwendel

Sonnjoch (2,457 m) is a mountain of the Karwendel range in the Northern Limestone Alps in Tyrol, Austria. It lies between the Falzthurntal valley, near the village of Pertisau, in the east and the Eng Valley to the west. It is a prominent mountain, which dominates the valleys below it, and appears to rise vertically above Falzthurntal. Another spectacular viewpoint is from Achen Lake. It is a popular hiking peak, with a relatively easy route, so it can get busy in summer.
