= Ödkarspitzen =

Three peaks in the Austrian state of Tyrol

Middle Ödkarspitze
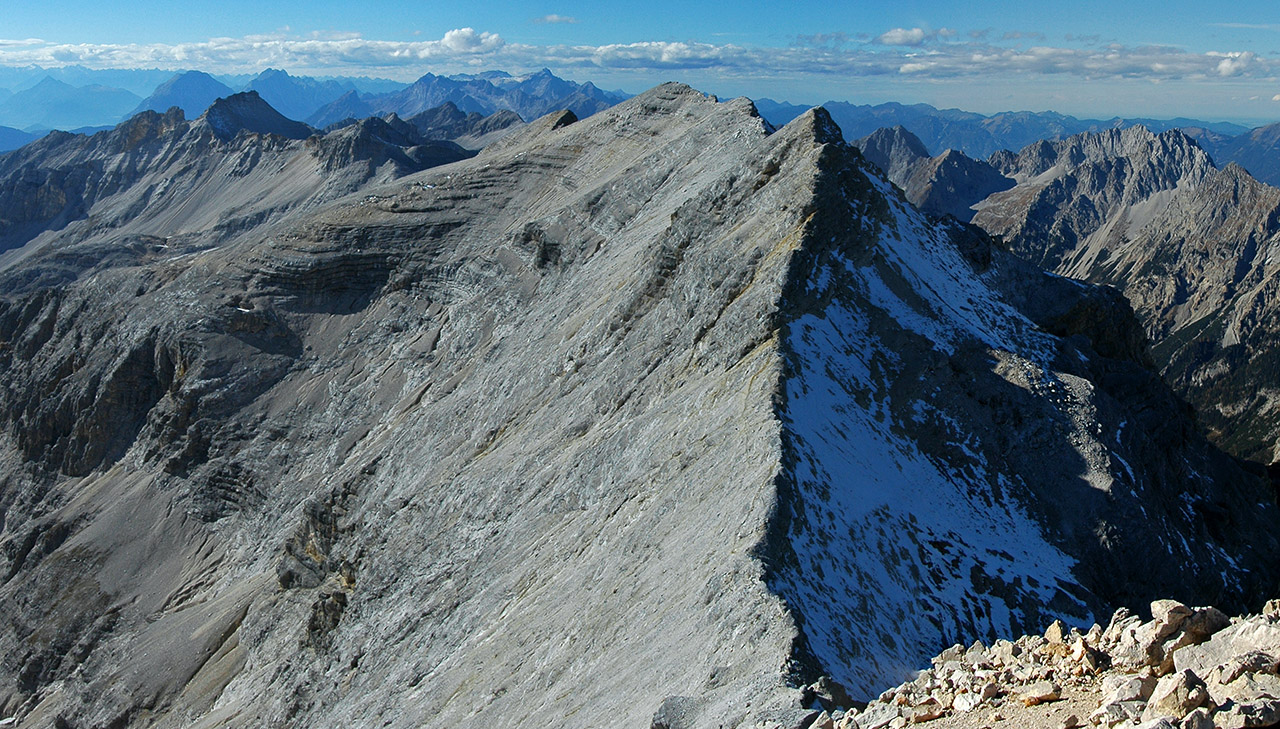
- The Ödkarspitzen from the Birkkarspitze

Highest point
- Elevation: 2,745 m (AA) (9,006 ft)
- Prominence: 2,745-2,635 m ↓ Schlauchkar Saddle
- Isolation: 1.0 km → Birkkarspitze
- Coordinates: 47°24′45″N 11°25′27″E

Geography
- Location within Austria
- Location: Tyrol, Austria
- Parent range: Hinterautal-Vomper chain, Karwendel

Geology
- Rock age: Triassic
- Rock type: Wetterstein limestone

Climbing
- First ascent: 1853 by a surveyor
- Normal route: Scharnitz – Karwendelhaus – Schlauchkarsattel – Middle Ödkarspitze

The Ödkarspitzen are three peaks in the Karwendel mountains in the Austrian state of Tyrol in the Hinterautal-Vomper Chain between the ultra-prominent mountain of Birkkarspitze in the east and the Marxenkarspitze (2,636 m (AA)) in the west. The highest of the summits is the Middle Ödkarspitze (German: Mittlere Ödkarspitze) with a height of 2,745 m (AA). The Western Ödkarspitze (Westliche Ödkarspitze) is 2,712 m (AA) high and the Eastern Ödkarspitze (Östliche Ödkarspitze) is 2,738 m (AA) high.

A waymarked and, in places, protected mountain path, that requires sure-footedness and a head for heights, leads to the summit. The Karwendelhaus may be used in summer as the base for an ascent. The usual route is via the cirque of Schlauchkar and the saddle of the same name. The crossing of all three summits is popular, the Brendelsteig path west of the Western Ödkarspitze being used as an alternative route to return to the Karwendelhaus.

== Literature ==
- Heinrich Klier; Fritz März (1978), Alpine Club guide Karwendelgebirge (in German) (11. ed.), Munich: Bergverlag Rudolf Rother, ISBN 3763312080
