= Demeljoch =

Mountain at the border between Germany and Austria

Coordinates: 47°33′N 11°35′E

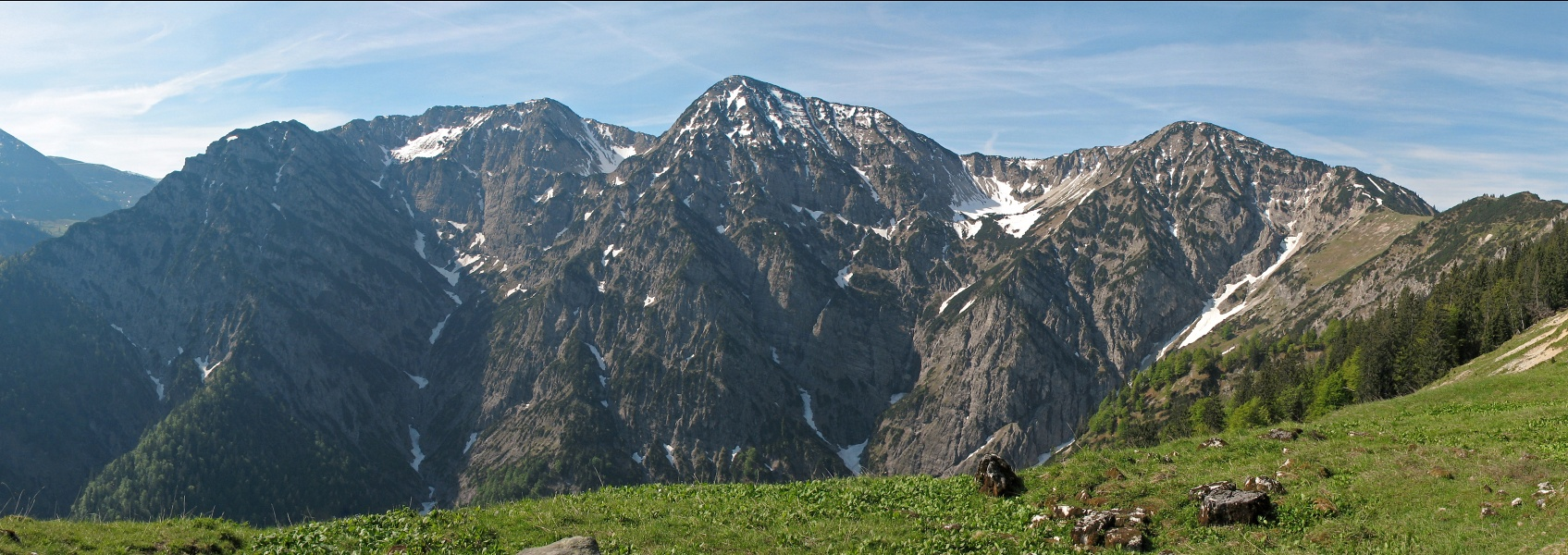
- Demeljoch from the North (from left to right: Zotenjoch, Demeljoch, and Dürrnbergjoch)

Highest point
- Elevation: 1,924 m (6,312 ft)

Geography
- Location: Bavaria, Germany and Tyrol, Austria

The Demeljoch (1,924 m) is a mountain at the border between Bavaria, Germany, and Tyrol, Austria. The summit can be reached through a hiking trail starting near the easternmost point of the Sylvensteinsee.
