= Schafreuter =

Coordinates: 47°19′12″N 11°17′06″E

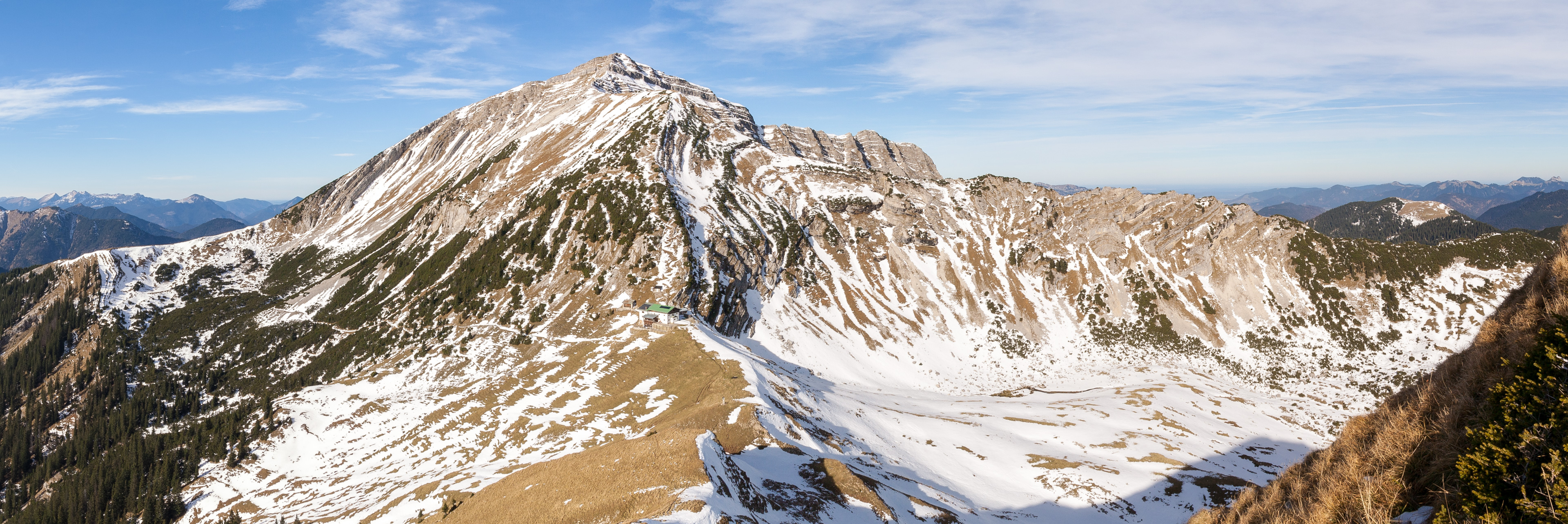
- Schafreuter in November 2006

Highest point
- Elevation: 2,102 m (6,896 ft)

Geography
- Location: Bavaria, Germany and Tyrol, Austria

Schafreuter or Schafreiter is a mountain at the border of Bavaria, Germany and Tirol, Austria in the Karwendel range.

== Alpinism ==
The Schafreiter is a popular destination both in summer for hiking and winter for ski tours. A common hiking access is from the south side via Tölzer hut. Another route is from the north ridge from Moosenalm.

== Gallery ==
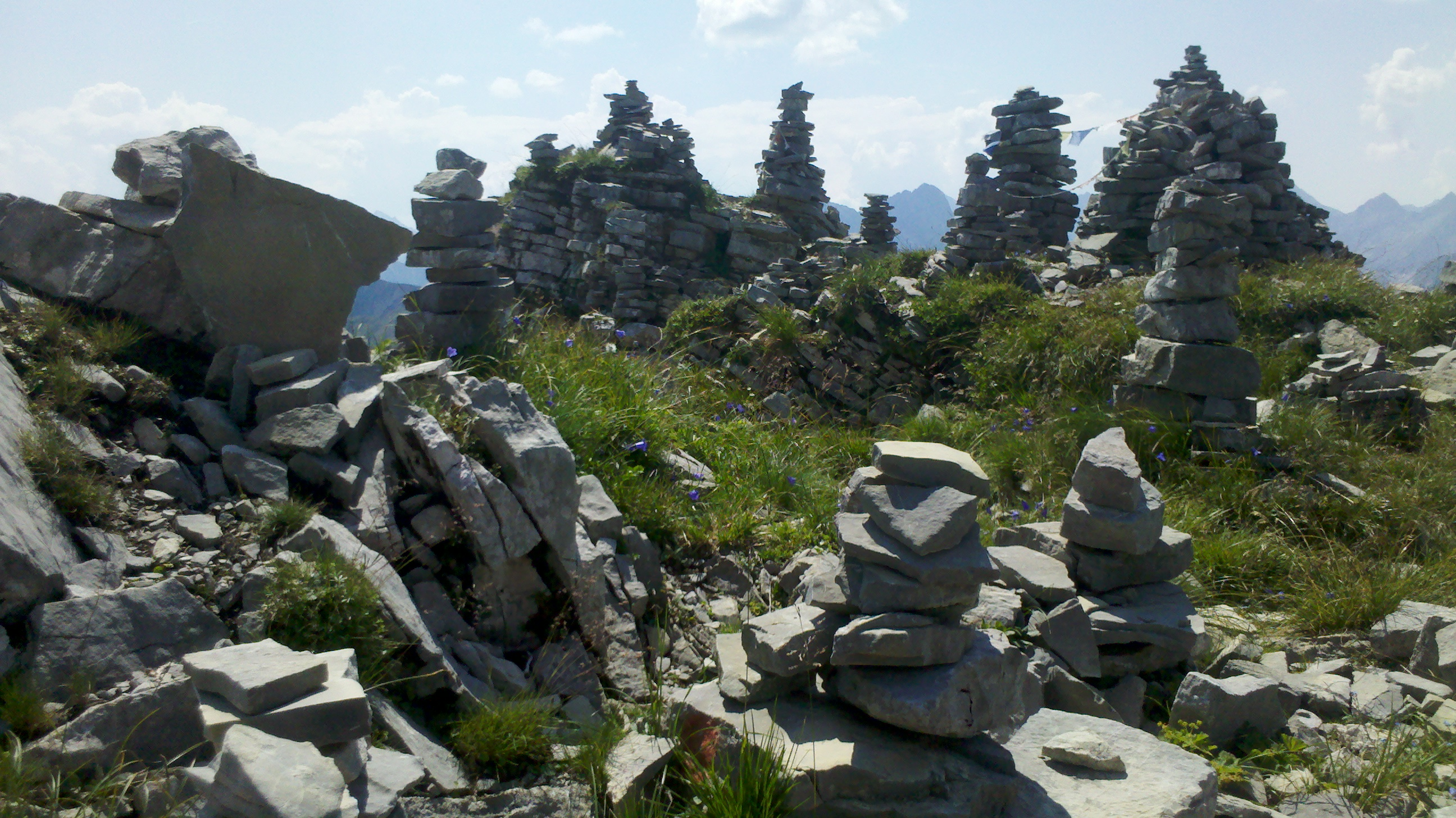
Secondary peak with Steinmandl
