= Brunnsteinspitze =

Mountain in the Alps

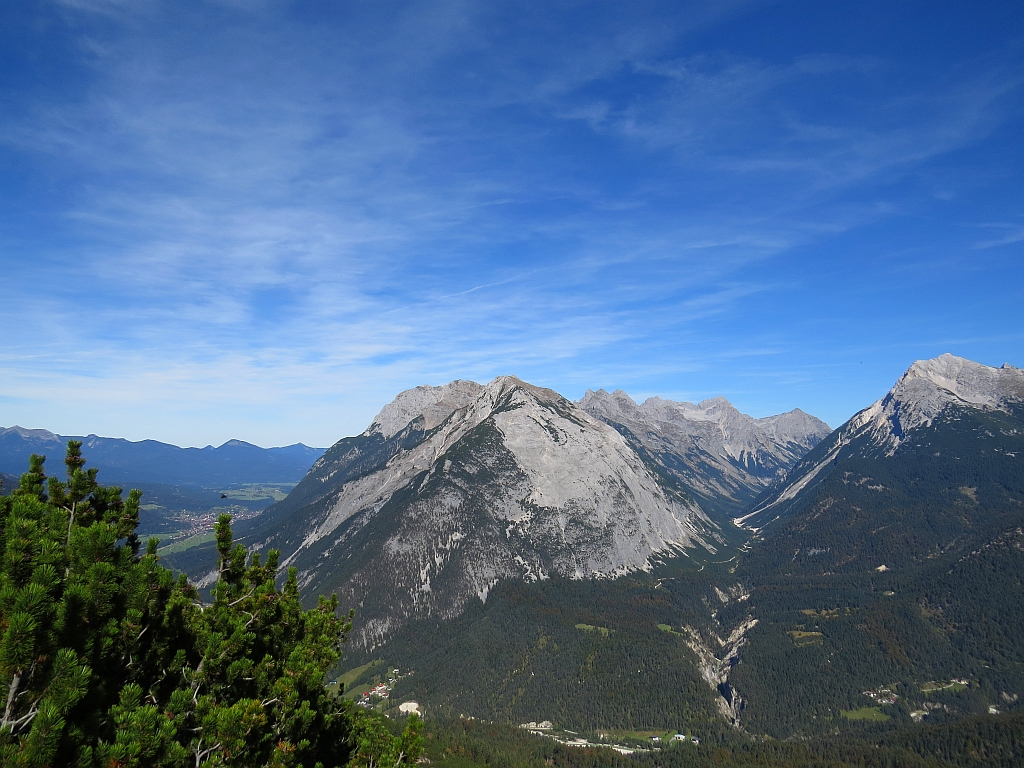

Highest point
- Elevation: 2,191 m (7,188 ft)
- Coordinates: 47°24′25″N 11°17′18″E

Geography
- Location: Bavaria, Germany

Brunnsteinspitze is a mountain of Bavaria, Germany.
