= Lamsenspitze =

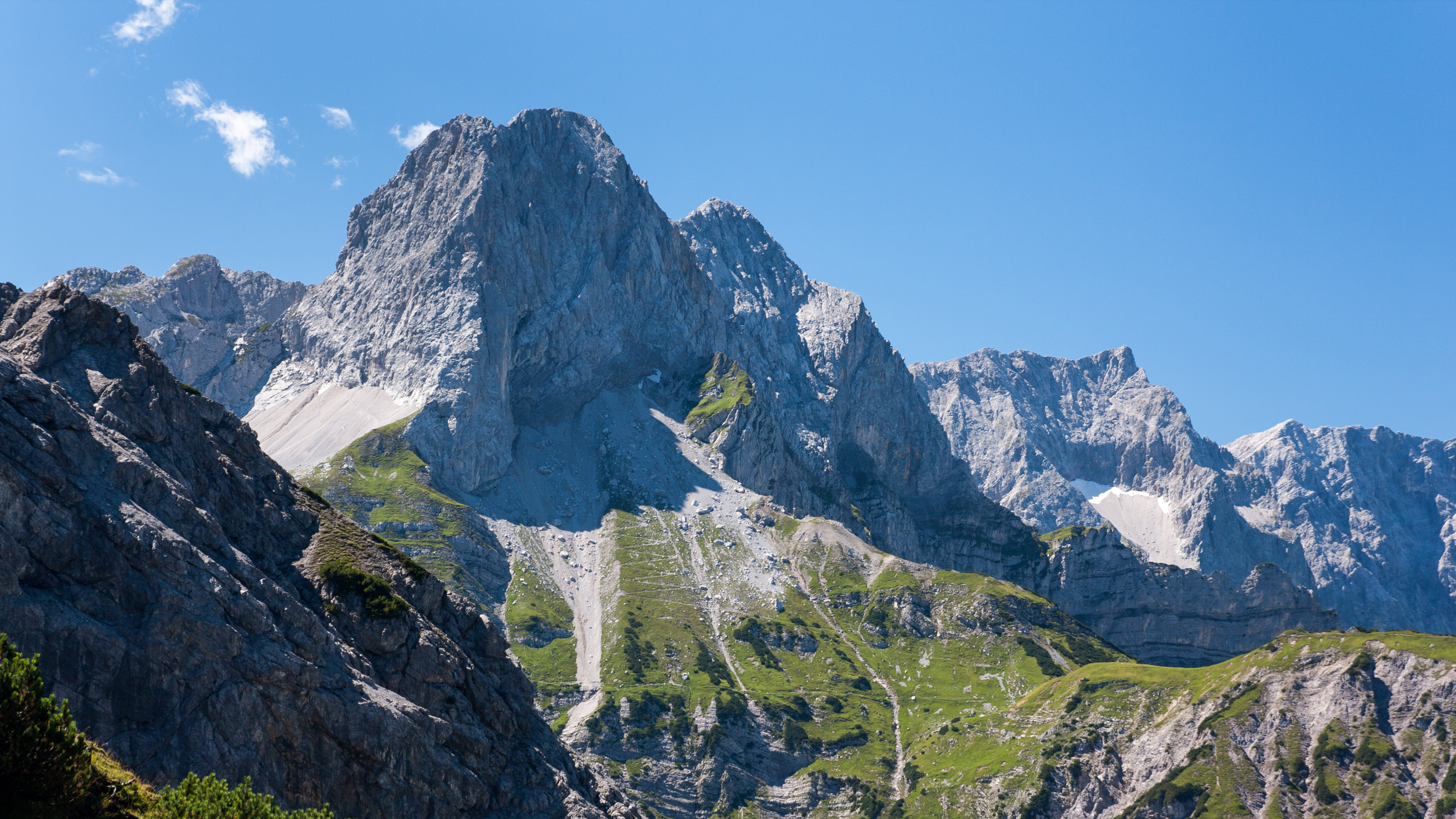
- Lamsenspitze, Northeast side

Highest point
- Elevation: 2,508 m (8,228 ft)
- Coordinates: 47°22′58″N 11°35′28″E

Geography
- Location within Austria
- Location: Tyrol, Austria
- Parent range: Alps, Karwendel

Climbing
- First ascent: Markus Vincent Lipold (1843)
- Easiest route: alpine hike

Lamsenspitze (elevation 2,508 m (8,228 ft)) is a summit of the Karwendel range in the Austrian state of Tyrol.

== Alpinism ==
The easiest route to the summit is a steep track secured with fixed wire ropes starting at the Lamsenjoch Hut (Lamsenjochhütte) at the bottom of the steep eastern wall of the Lamsenspitze. Also a garden for climbers can be found there.

A second prominent route goes through a Via ferrata of mid difficulty that includes a climb through a tunnel called Brudertunnel or Lamstunnel. The Lamsenjoch Hut is reachable most easily starting from Pertisau or from the Ahornboden as a mountain hike.

There are two crosses at the summit, one of them can be seen from the Lamsenjoch Hut.
