= Westliche Karwendelspitze =

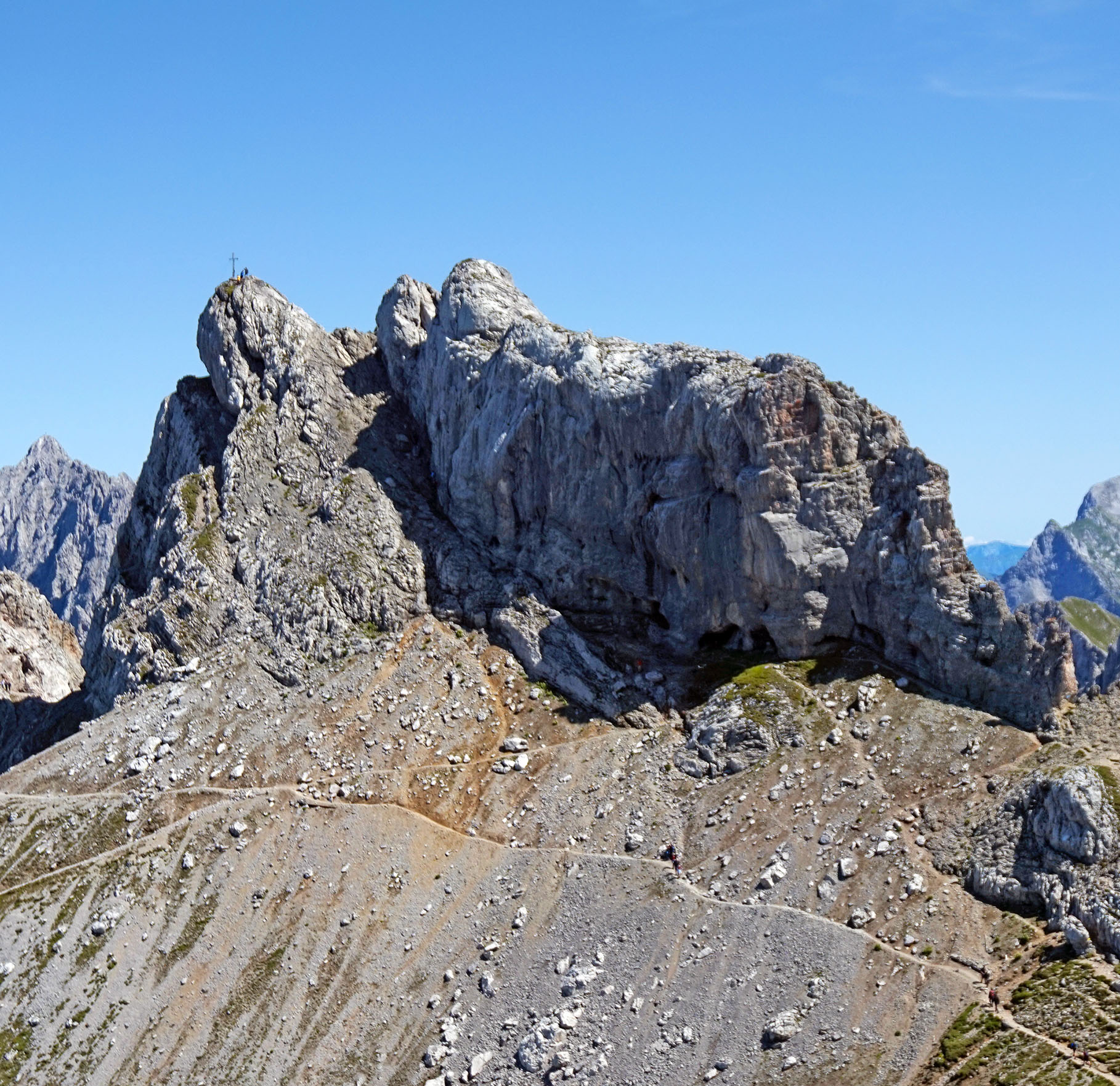
- Western Karwendelspitze over the Karwendel pit

Highest point
- Elevation: 2,385 m (7,825 ft)
- Coordinates: 47°25′48″N 11°17′56″E

Geography
- Location: Bavaria, Germany
- Parent range: Karwendel

Climbing
- First ascent: 1654 by Christian Mentzel

Westliche Karwendelspitze is a 2385 m above sea level high mountain in the Karwendel on the border between Bavaria and North Tyrol. The summit is part of the Northern Karwendel chain and is located south-east above Mittenwald, from where it can be reached by a cable car.
