= Birkkarspitze =

Mountain in Tyrol, Austria

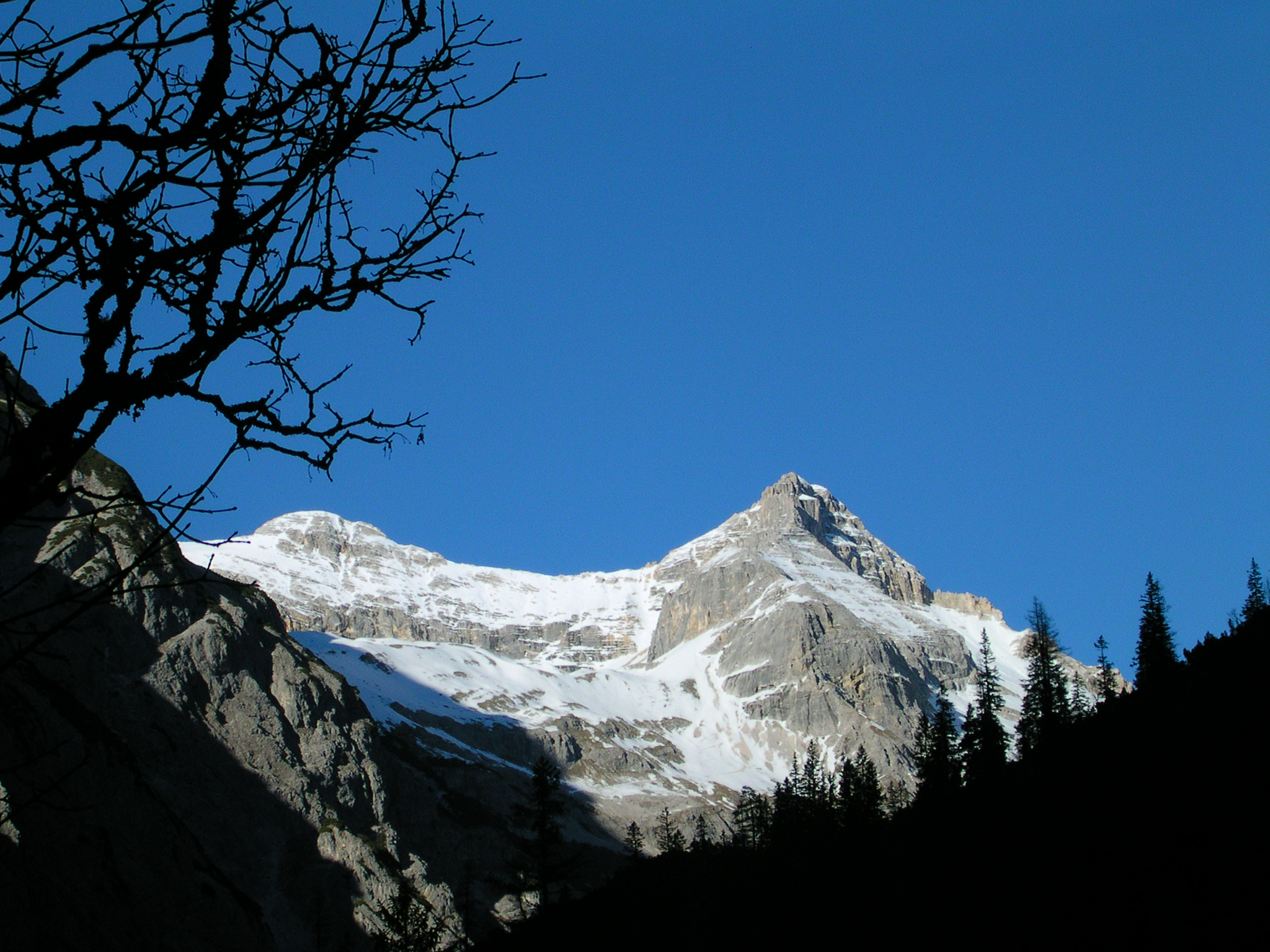
- The Birkkarspitze from the south. Left: the Ödkarspitze

Highest point
- Elevation: 2,749 m (9,019 ft)
- Prominence: 1564 m ↓ Seefeld Saddle
- Isolation: 27.0 km → Rosenjoch
- Listing: Ultra
- Coordinates: 47°24′40″N 11°26′16″E

Geography
- Location within Alps
- Location: Tyrol, Austria
- Parent range: Karwendel

The Birkkarspitze (2749 m) is the highest mountain in the Karwendel range, Austria as well as an ultra prominent peak. It is located within the Innsbruck-Land District of Tyrol, Austria.

== See also ==
- List of Alpine peaks by prominence
