= Erlspitze Group =

Erlspitze Group Erlspitzgruppe im Karwendel
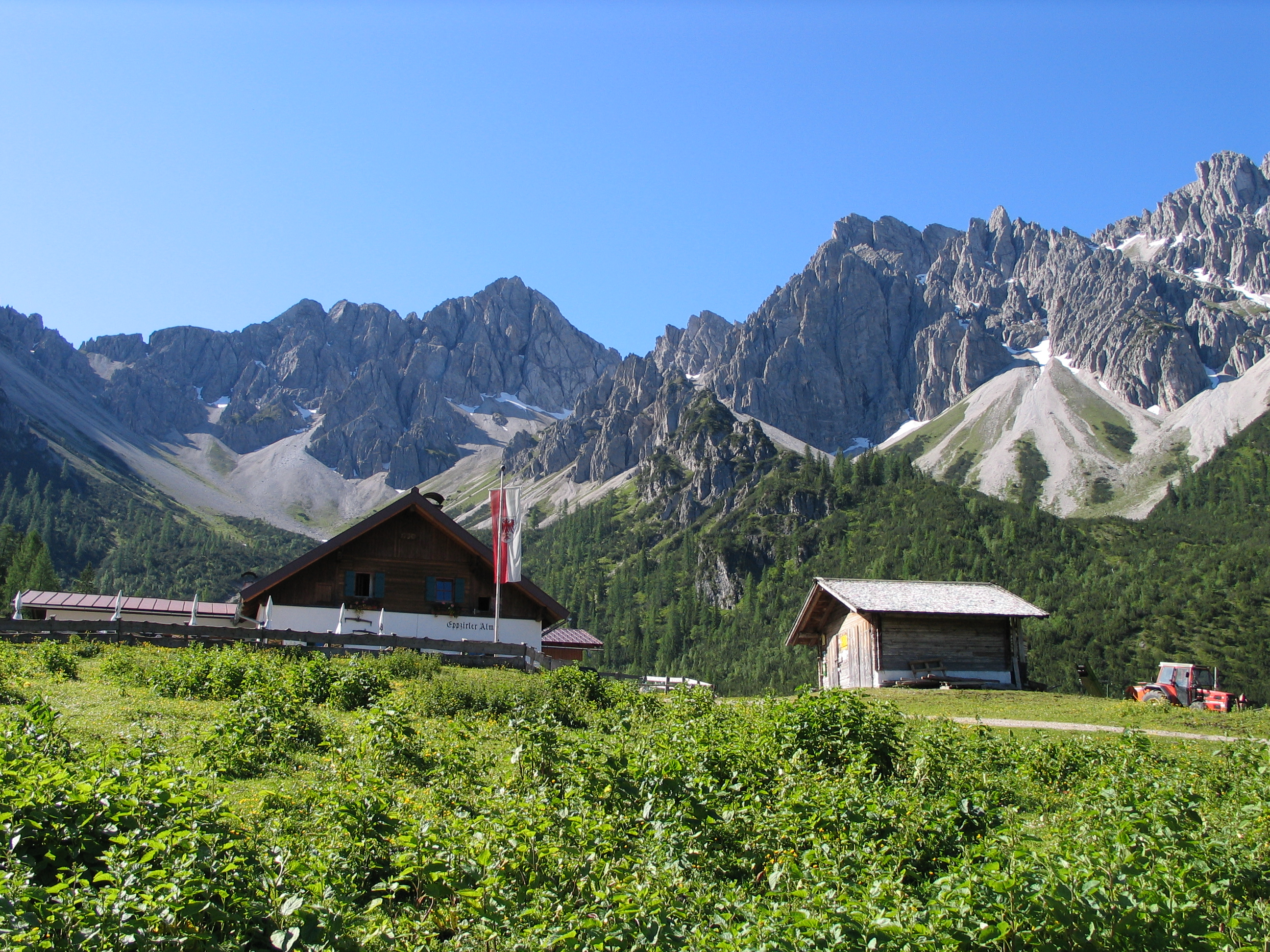
- Eppzirler Alm. Left rear: the Erlspitze; right rear: the Kuhljochspitze

Highest point
- Peak: Erlspitze
- Elevation: 2,405 m s.l.m.

Geography
- Location: Tyrol, Austria
- Range coordinates: 47°20′00″N 11°15′00″E

The Erlspitze Group (German: Erlspitzgruppe), also called the Seefeld Group, is the southwesternmost side range of the Austrian part of the Karwendel mountains in the Alps. It forms a horseshoe-shaped highland around the valley of Eppzirler Tal and is joined in the south to the Nordkette by the Erl Saddle (Erlsattel) near Solsteinhaus. It is bounded in the west by the Seefeld Basin, in the east by the valleys of the Gleirschtal and the Großes Kristental; its forested northern foothills reach as far as Scharnitz.

Unlike the four main ranges of the Karwendel, the Erlspitze Group is made of Main Dolomite. Typical of this rock are bizarre weathering forms, like towers, pinnacles and sharply formed arêtes as well as rock arches and caves as a consequence of the rapid erosion of individual rock strata.

Its valley bases are Hochzirl, Reith, Seefeld and Scharnitz, all of which are on the Innsbruck-Mittenwald section of the Mittenwald Railway.

Two alpine club huts act as bases for tours in the area of the Erlspitze Group: in the west is the Nördlinger Hut and, in the south, is the Solsteinhaus. In the northern part of the Erlspitze Group are two huts open in summer: the Oberbrunnalm and, in the Eppzirler Tal, the Eppzirler Alm.

Important peaks (by height)

- Erlspitze (2,405 m (AA))
- Reither Spitze (2,374 m (AA))
- Freiungen (2,332 m (AA))
- Kuhljochspitze (2,297 m (AA))
- Härmelekopf (2,224 m (AA))
- Seefelder Spitze (2,221 m (AA))
- Fleischbanktürme (2,216 m (AA))
- Fleischbankspitze (2,206 m (AA))
- Karlspitze (2,174 m (AA))
- Seefelder Joch (2,060 m (AA))
- Zischgenkopf (1,932 m (AA))
- Zäunlkopf (1,746 m (AA))
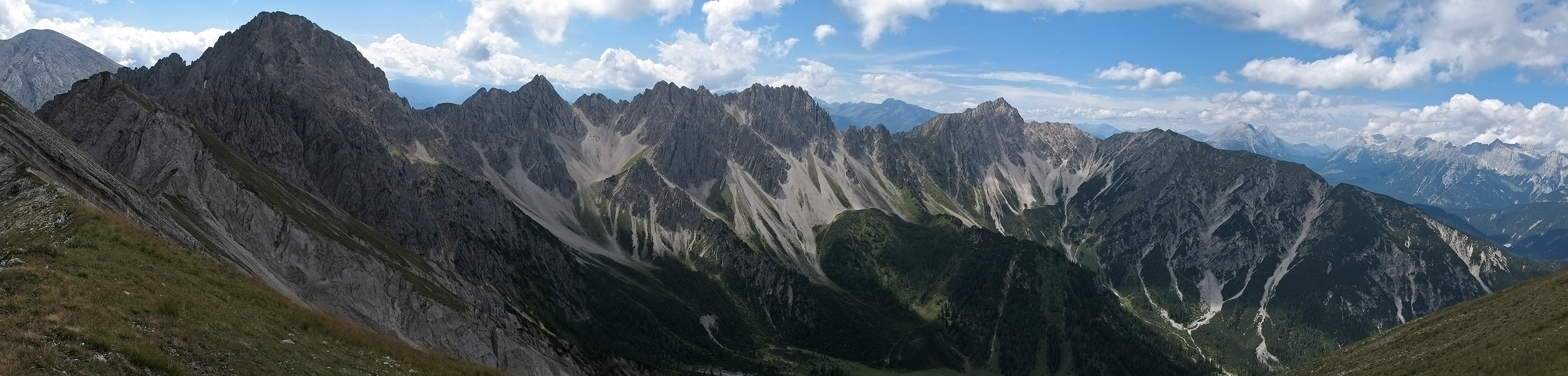
North side of the Erlspitze Group. From the left: the Erlspitze, Kuhljochspitze, Freiungen, Reither Spitze, Seefelder Spitze and Seefelder Joch

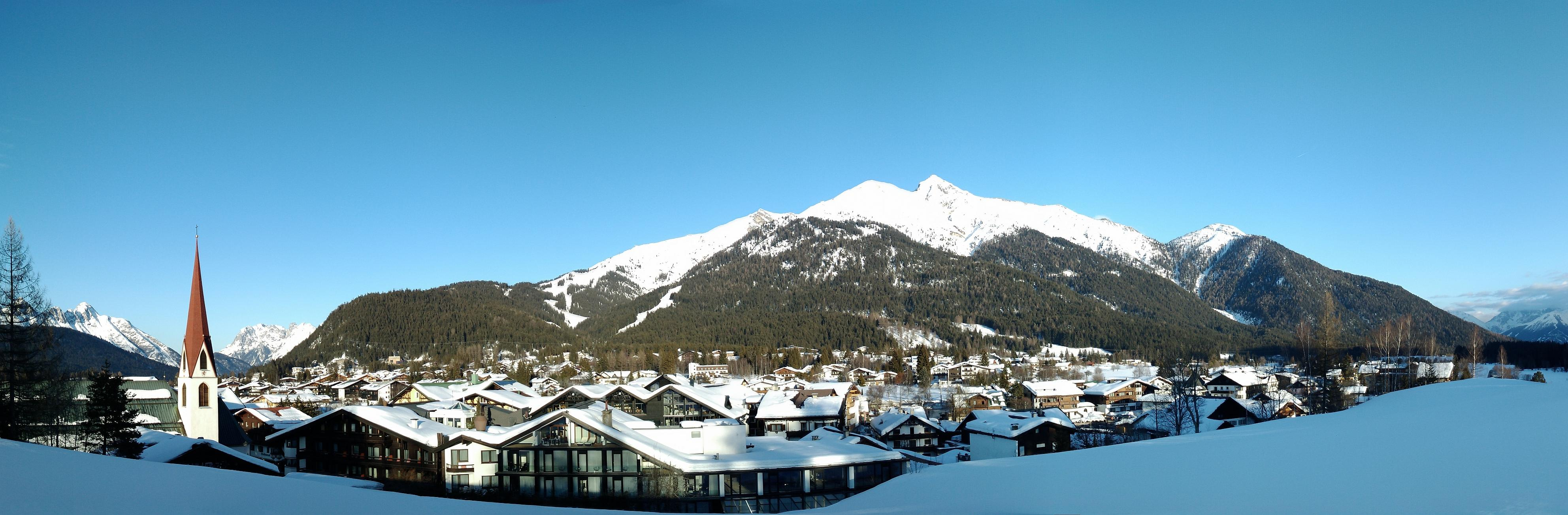
View from the west: Seefelder Joch, Seefelder Spitze, Härmelekopf, Reither Spitze and Rauenkopf. In the foreground: Seefeld
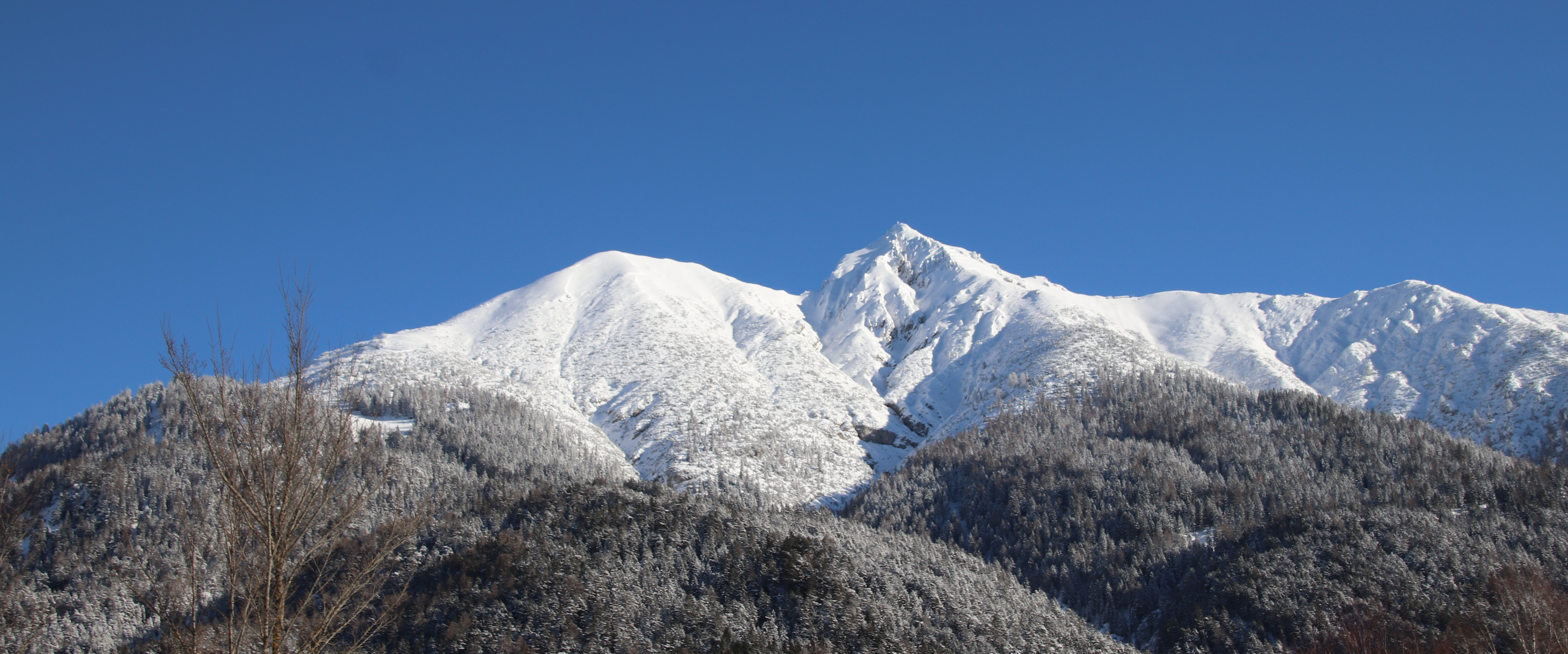
Panorama of the Austrian mountain peaks Härmelekopf and Reither Spitze. View from Wildsee, Seefeld, Tirol.

== Literature ==
- Walter Klier: Alpine Club Guide Karwendel alpin. 15th edn., Bergverlag Rudolf Rother, Munich, 2005. ISBN 3-7633-1121-1.
