= Erlspitze =

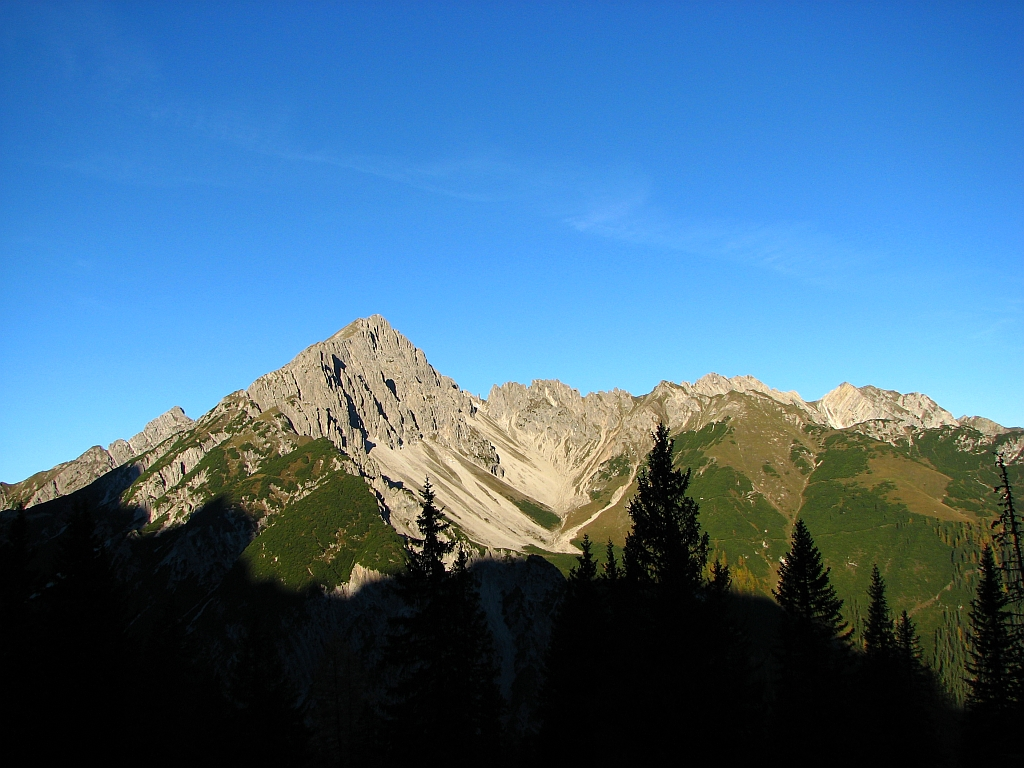
- The Erlspitze from the Gipfelstürmer Way

Highest point
- Elevation: 2,405 m (AA) (7,890 ft)
- Prominence: 2,405-1,798 m ↓ Erl Saddle (Erlsattel)
- Isolation: 2.4 km → Großer Solstein
- Coordinates: 47°19′12″N 11°17′07″E

Geography
- Location within Austria
- Location: Tyrol, Austria
- Parent range: Erlspitzgruppe, Karwendel

Geology
- Rock age: Norium
- Rock type: main dolomite

Climbing
- First ascent: 1886/1890 by August and Fraja Lieber (tourists)
- Normal route: protected route from the Solsteinhaus

The Erlspitze, at 2,405 m (AA), is the highest mountain of the range to which it gives its name in the southeastern corner of the Karwendel Alps. Its pyramid-shaped summit makes it a good observation peak north of the Erl Saddle and the Solsteinhaus mountain hut.

== Ascents ==
The normal route runs from the Solsteinhaus (1,805 m (AA)) along the south arête on a waymarked path (with several sections protected by cable) to the summit (ca. 1.5 hours).

The "Zirler Klettersteig" runs along the Eppzirler Scharte (2,104 m (AA)) and the west arête (ca. 2–2.5 hours from the Solsteinhaus; the col can also be reached from the Eppzirler Alm to the north). This requires sure-footedness and a head for heights and was renovated and made more interesting in 2007; the cable being led out of the rock crevices. Klettersteig equipment and helmets are recommended. Its difficulty is assessed as between A and B according to the signage. Shortly before the summit is a short section at grade D, which can be circumnavigated, however, without loss of time.

== Tourism ==
From 1886 to 1890, the Innsbruck doctor and poet, August Lieber, together with his son, Fraja Lieber, climbed nearly all the summits in the Nordkette and Erlspitze Group. For many peaks in the latter group, including the Erlspitze, these were the first known tourist ascents.

== Gallery ==
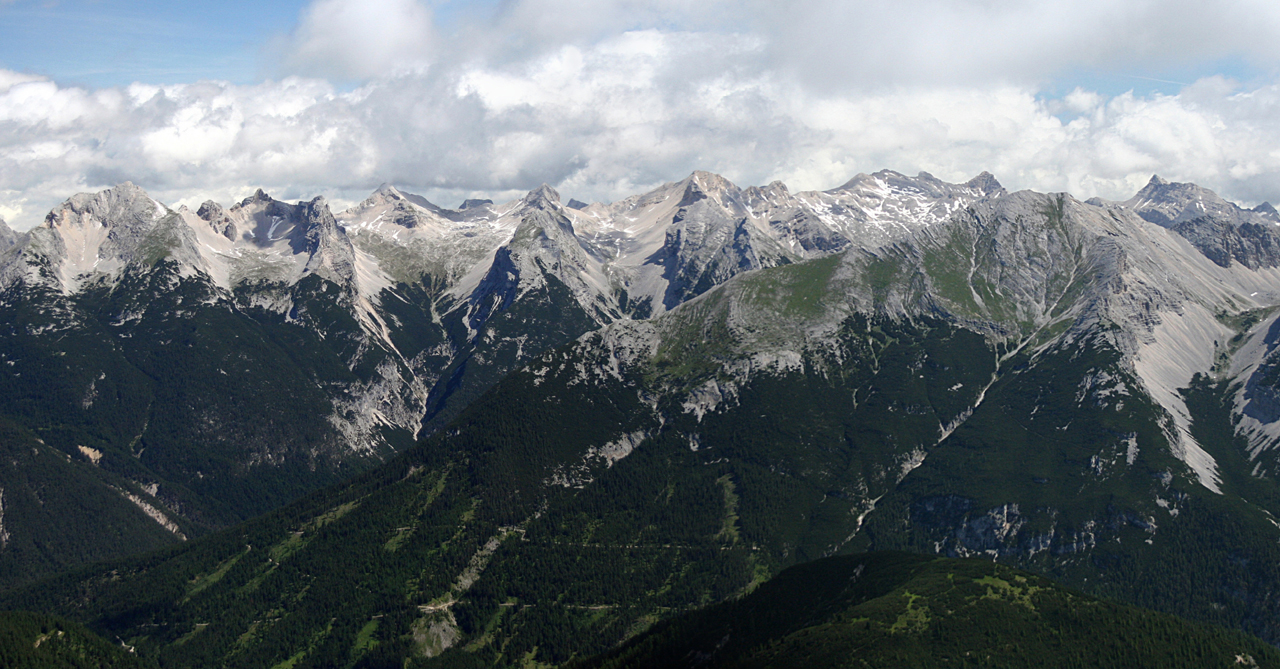
The western Hinterautal-Vomper Chain seen from the Erlspitze

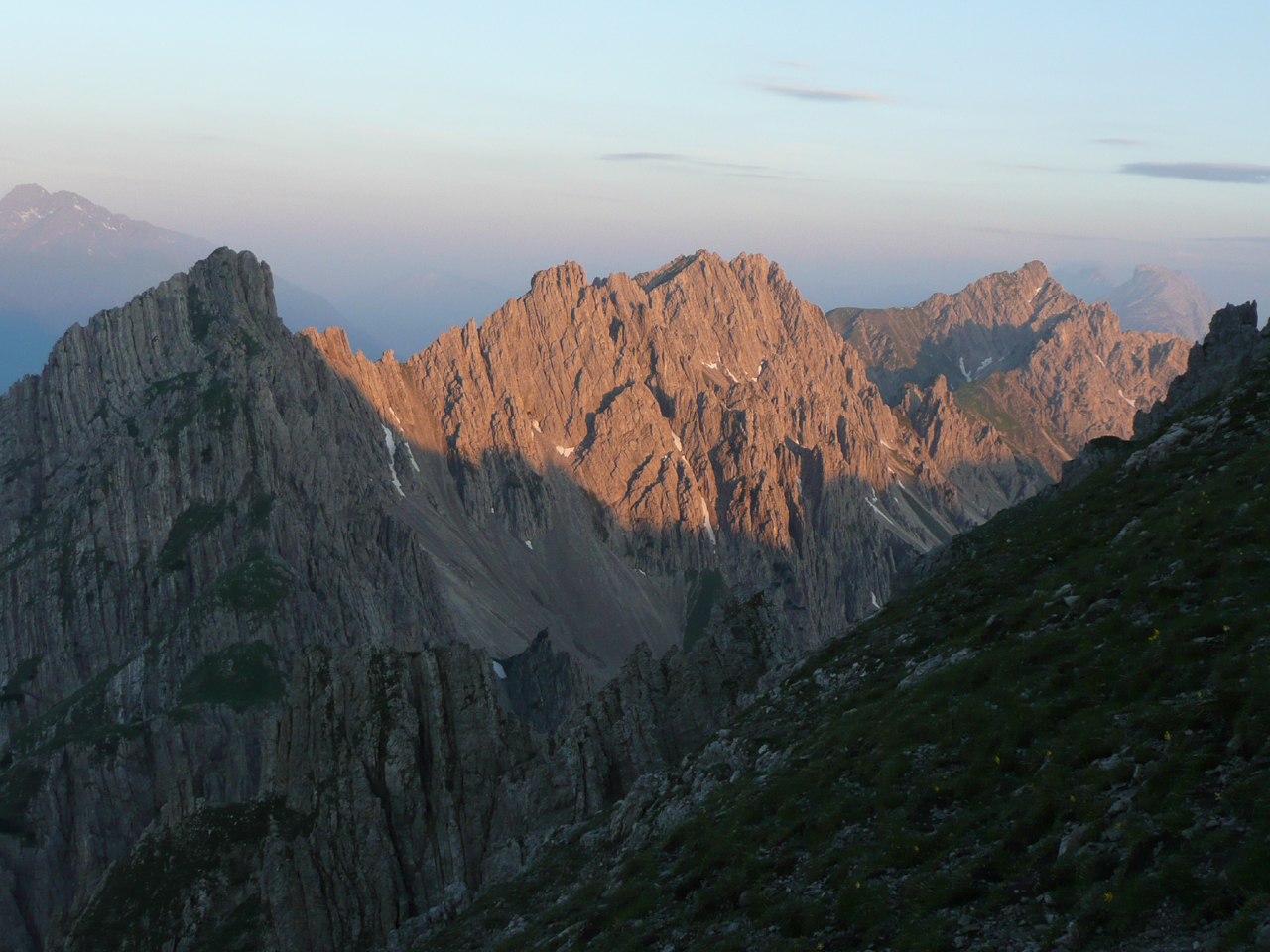
The Kuhljochspitze, Freiungen and Reither Spitze seen from the Erlspitze

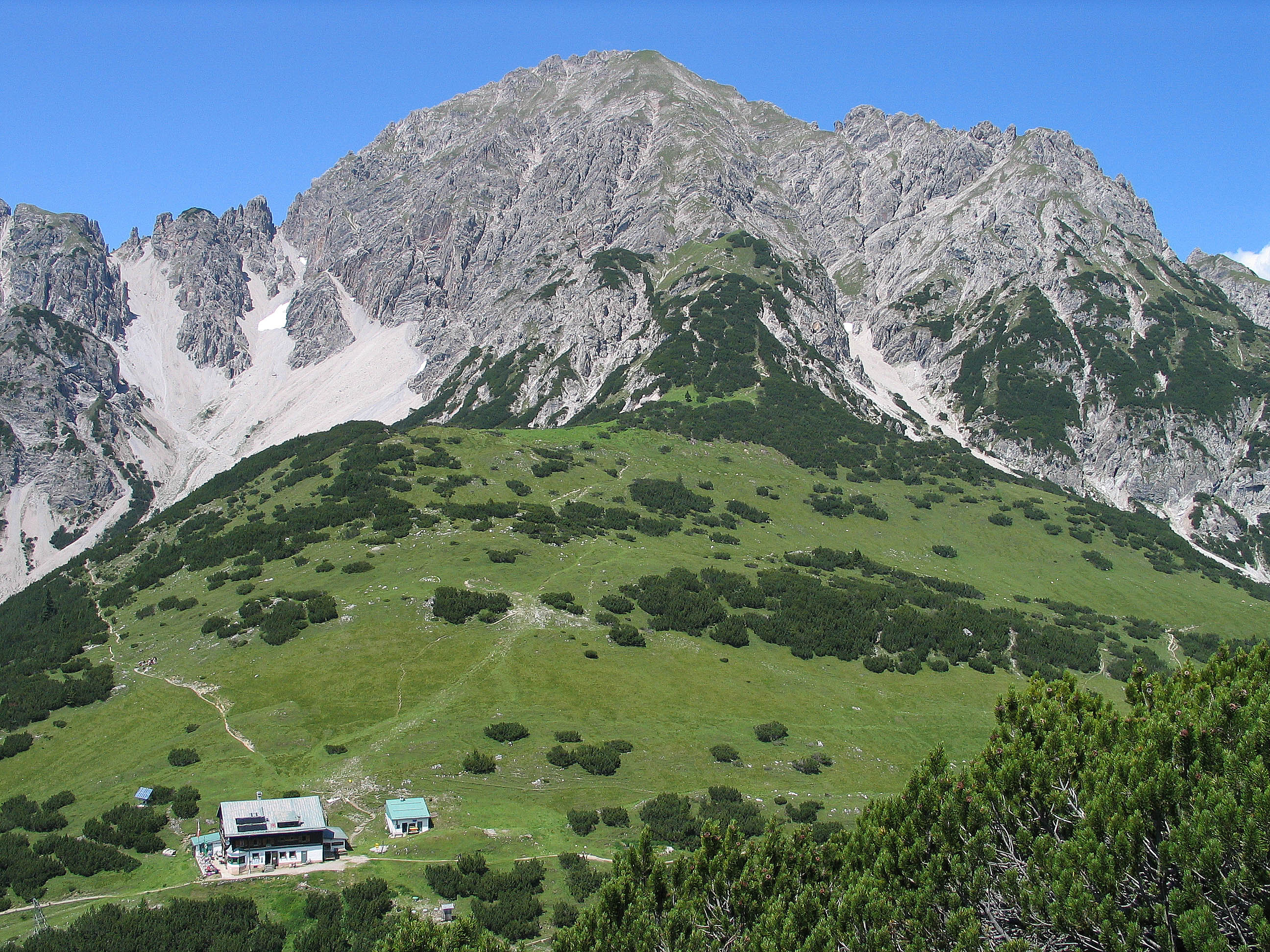
The Solsteinhaus below the Erlspitze

== Literature ==
- Walter Klier: Alpenvereinsführer Karwendel alpin, 15th edn., 2005, Bergverlag Rudolf Rother, Munich, ISBN 3-7633-1121-1
