= Solsteinhaus =

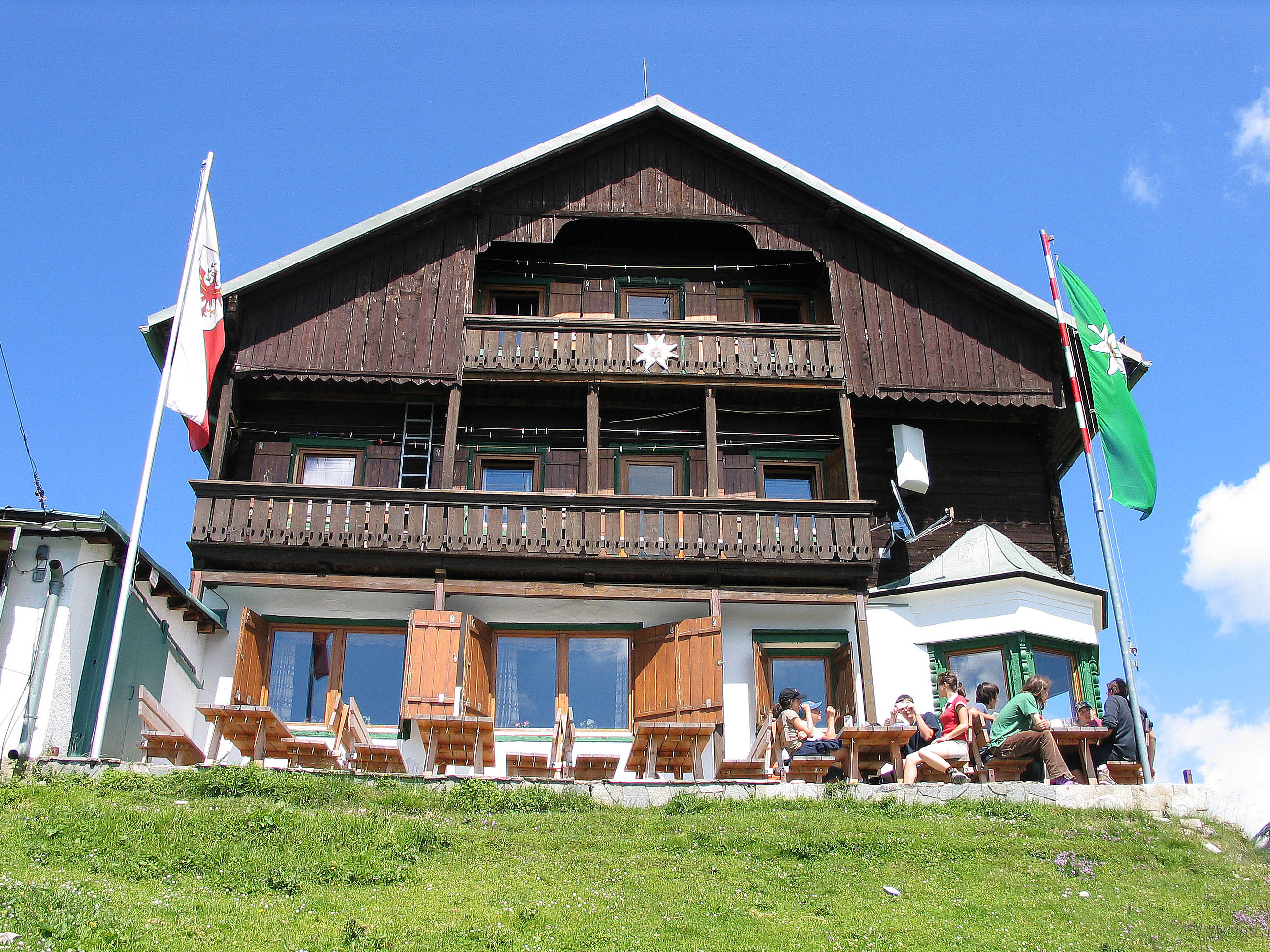
- Interactive map of the Solsteinhaus area

General information
- Location: Erlsattel
- Coordinates: 47.3081°N 11.2881°E
- Elevation: 1,806 m (5,925 ft)
- Year built: 1912/14, renovated 2007/08
- Owner: Zweig Innsbruck des OeAV

Website
- [ www.solsteinhaus.at/%20www.solsteinhaus.at]]

The Solsteinhaus is an Alpine Club hut belonging to the Austrian Alpine Club located at a height of 1,806 m (AA) on the Erl Saddle (Erlsattel) between the mountains of the Nordkette and Erlspitze Group. It was opened in 1914 and totally renovated in 2007. It lies in the western Karwendel Alps in the state of Tyrol not far from the state capital of Innsbruck. Due to its central location and the numerous tour options it offers, the hut is a base for climbers taking part in tours of several days long, as well as a starting point for summit attempts. In addition the hut is a popular destination for hikers who can easily do a day tour to the hut. In winter the hut is closed, but there is a winter room for ski tourers. During safe avalanche conditions, high Alpine ski tours can be undertaken to the surrounding summits; but these all require good experience.

== Visit of Bruno the Bear / JJ1 ==
In the evening hours of 7 June 2006 a brown bear, JJ1, otherwise known as Bruno, was seen from the Solsteinhaus. On the following day several 15 to 20 centimetre large imprints of bear paws were found near the building.

== Approaches ==
- From Hochzirl (Mittenwald Railway) along the Hüttenweg, easy, time: 2.5 hours
- From Scharnitz through the valleys of Hinterautal, Gleirschtal and Großkristental, easy, time: 5 hours
- From Gießenbach (Mittenwald Railway) through the Eppzirler Tal and along the Eppzirler Scharte, medium, time: 5 hours

== Crossings ==
- Nördlinger Hut along the Freiungen Ridgeway (Freiungen-Höhenweg, easy route, partly a protected Klettersteig), time: 4.5 hours
- Eppzirler Alm along the Eppzirler Scharte, medium, time: 3 hours
- New Magdeburg Hut along the Zirler Schützensteig, time: 1.5 hours
- Pfeishut along the Gipfelstürmer Way (Gipfelstürmerweg), Frau Hitt Saddle, Seegrube, Hafelekarspitze and Goethe Way, challenging, time: 6 hours

== Summit routes ==
- Großer (2,541 m (AA)) and Kleiner (2,637 m (AA)) Solstein along the west flank, medium, time: 2–3 hours
- Kuhljochspitze (2,297 m (AA)) along the Freiungen Ridgeway and the north arête, medium, time: 2 hours
- Erlspitze (2,405 m (AA)) along the south flank and the southeast arête, medium, time: 1.5 hours

== Gallery ==
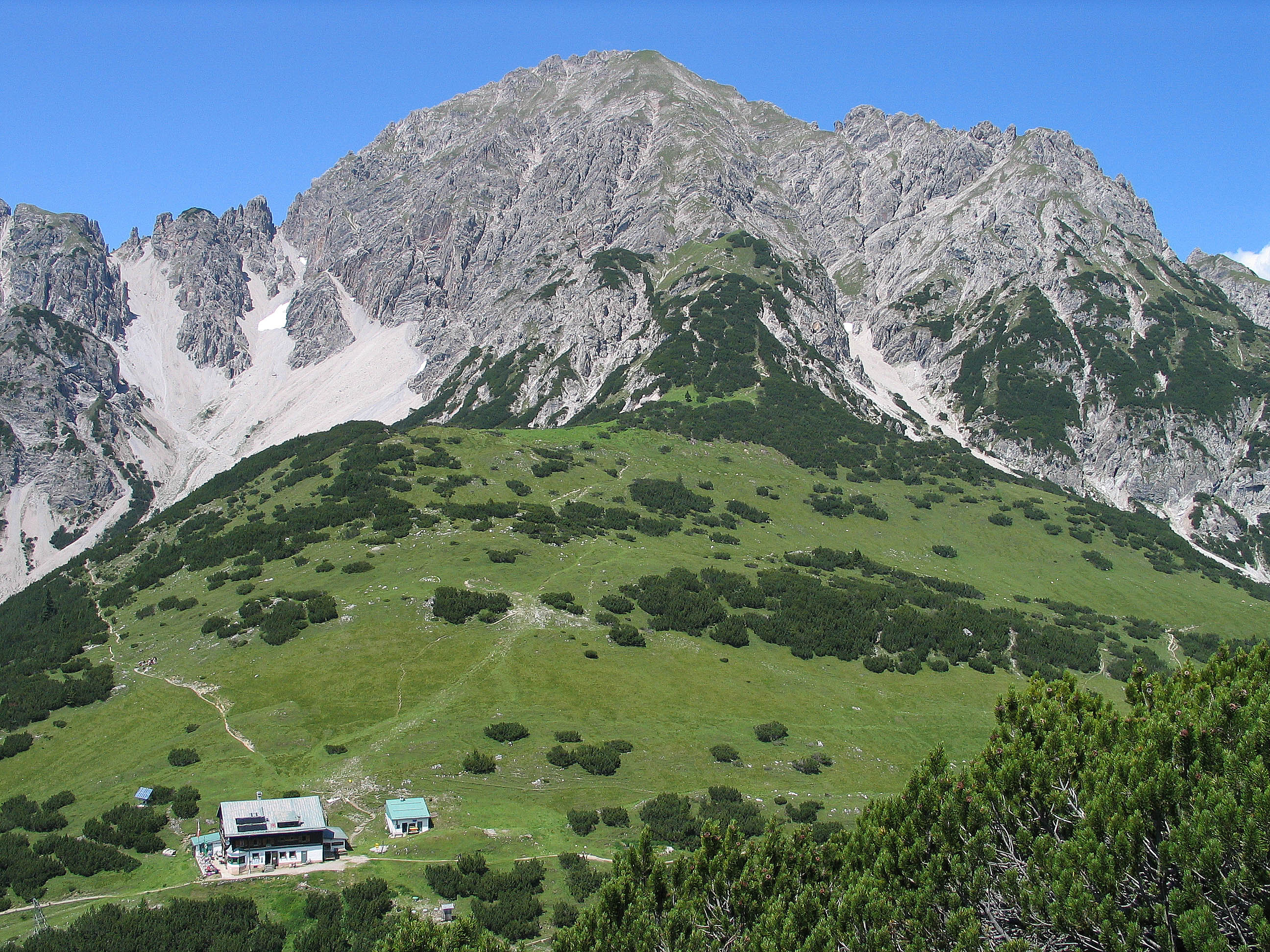
The Solsteinhaus in front of the Erlspitze

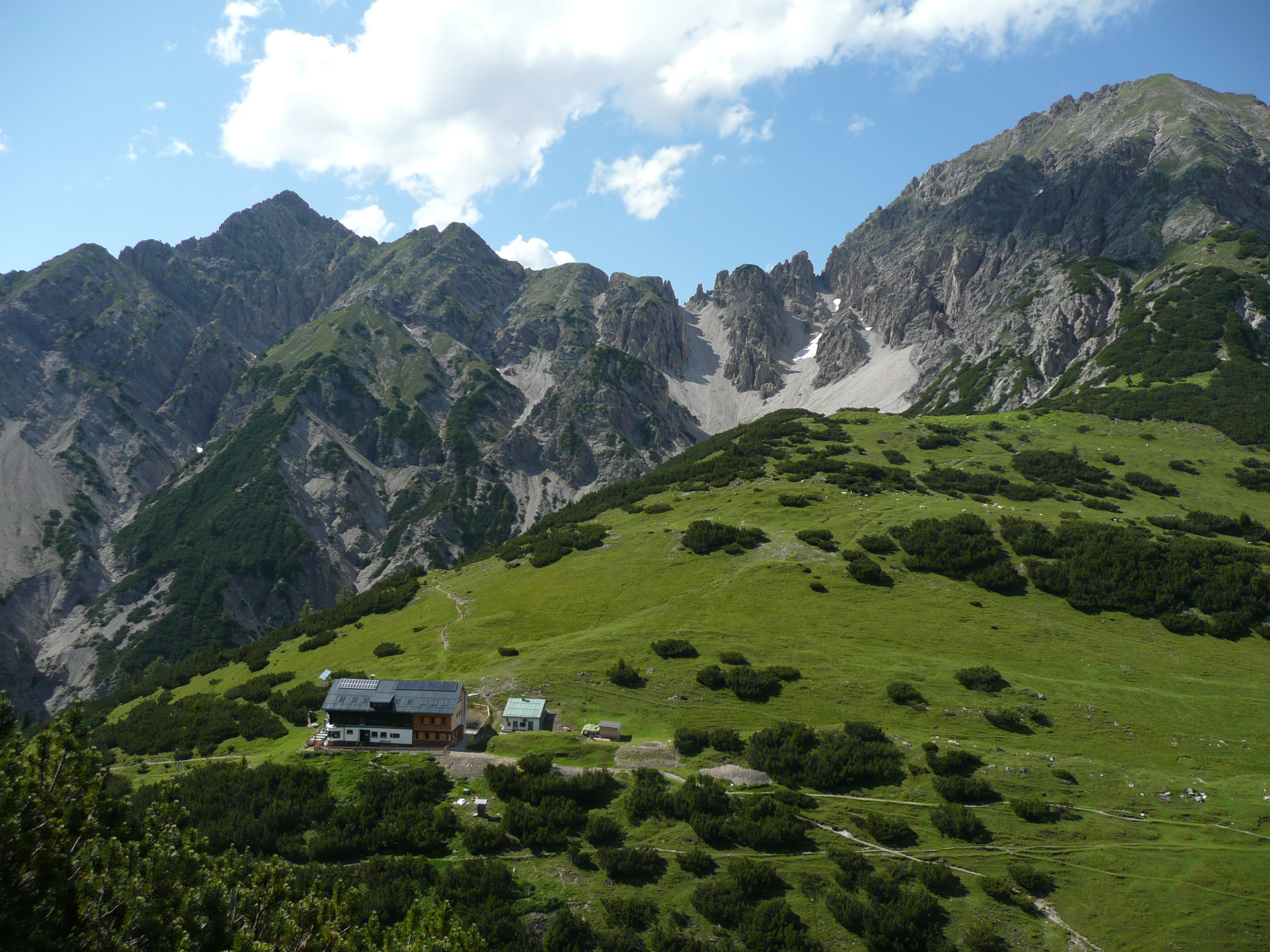
The Solsteinhaus, following its 2007 renovation, in front of the Kuhljochspitze (left) and Erlspitze (right)

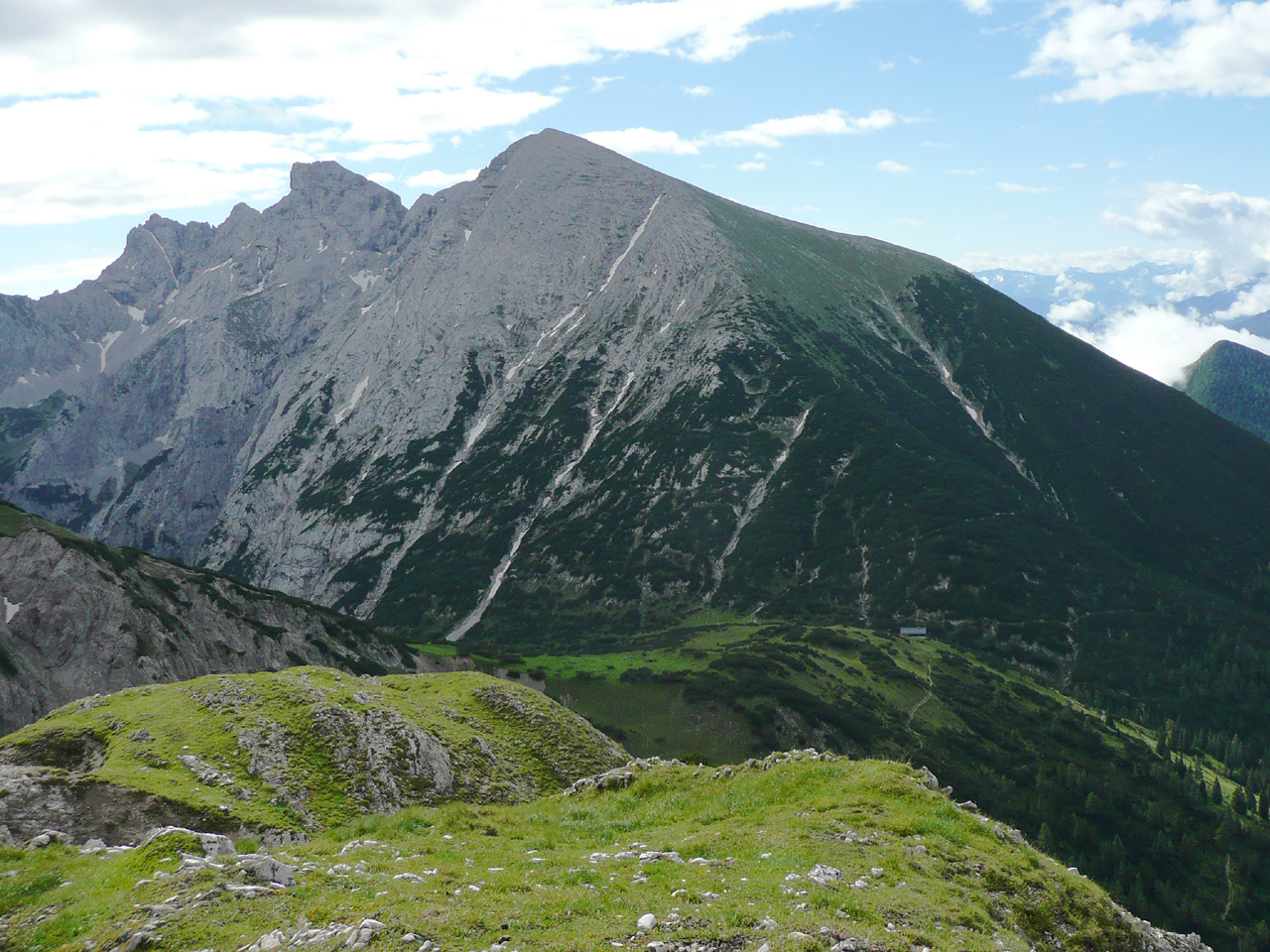
Kleiner (left) + Großer (right) Solstein with the Solsteinhaus from the NW

== Literature ==
- Walter Klier: Alpine Club Guide Karwendel alpin, 15. Auflage, 2005, Bergverlag Rudolf Rother, Munich, ISBN 3-7633-1121-1
