= Freiungspitzen =

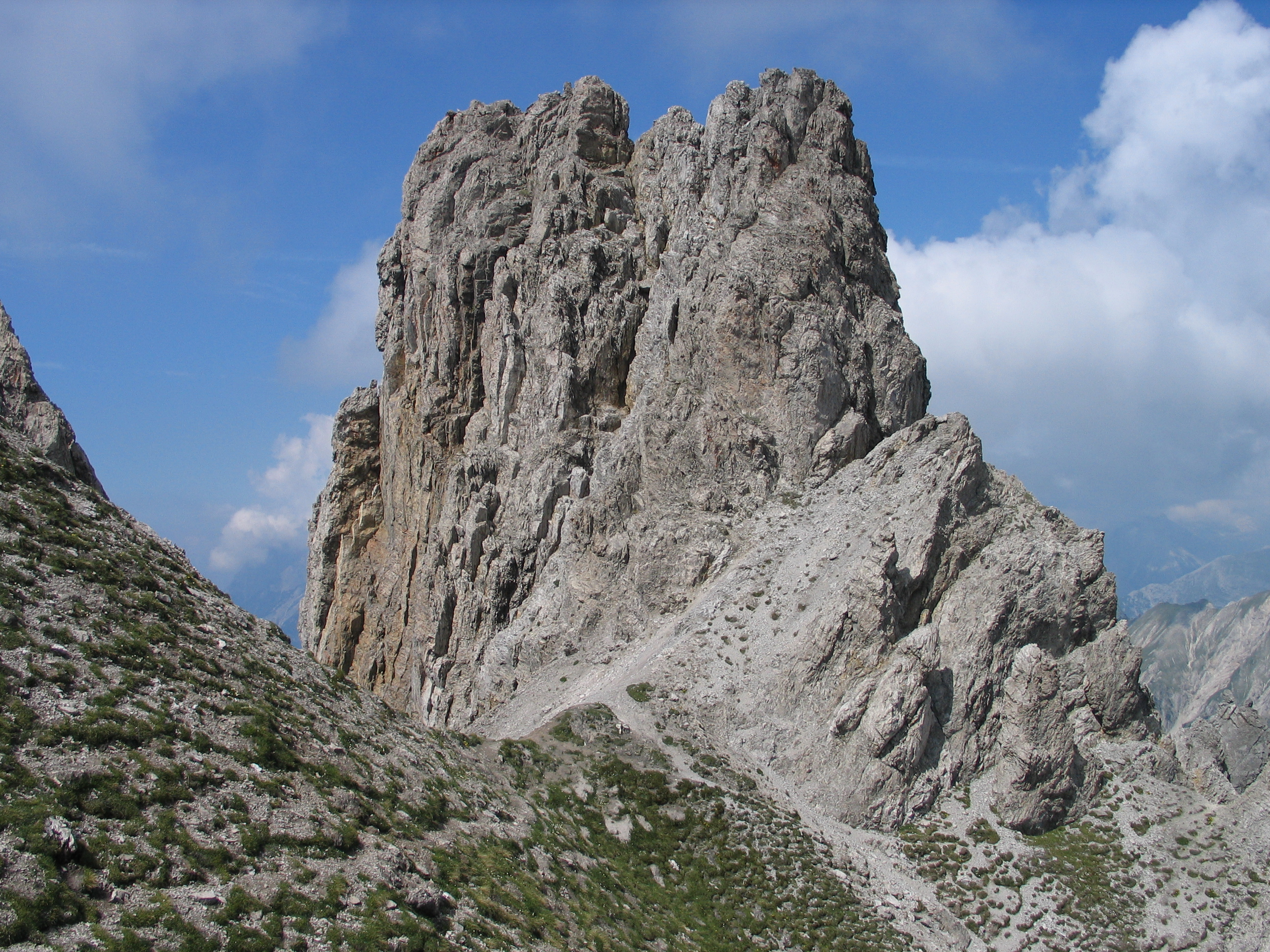

Highest point
- Elevation: 2,332 m (AA) (7,651 ft)
- Prominence: 2,332-2,104 m ↓ Eppzirler Scharte
- Isolation: 1.5 km → Reither Spitze
- Coordinates: 47°19′00″N 11°15′35″E

Geography
- Location within Austria
- Location: Tyrol, Austria
- Parent range: Erlspitze Group, Karwendel

Geology
- Rock age: Norian
- Rock type: main dolomite

Climbing
- First ascent: 1886/1890 by August and Fraja Lieber (tourists)
- Normal route: Freiungen Ridgeway

The Freiungspitzen (plural) are a group of 3 peaks in the Erlspitze Group in the Karwendel Alps on the territory of the Austrian municipality of Zirl. The highest summit, the west top, has a height of 2,332 m (AA), the middle top is 2,322 m (AA) and the east top is 2,302 m (AA).

== Ascents ==
The Freiungen Ridgeway (Freiungen-Höhenweg, a partially secured mountain path) between the Nördlinger Hut and the Solsteinhaus runs past the tops. The west top of the Freiungen is easy to ascend.

== Literature ==
- Walter Klier: Alpenvereinsführer Karwendel alpin, 15th edn., 2005, Bergverlag Rudolf Rother, Munich, ISBN 3-7633-1121-1
