= Nördlinger Hut =

Alpine Club hut in Tyrol, Austria

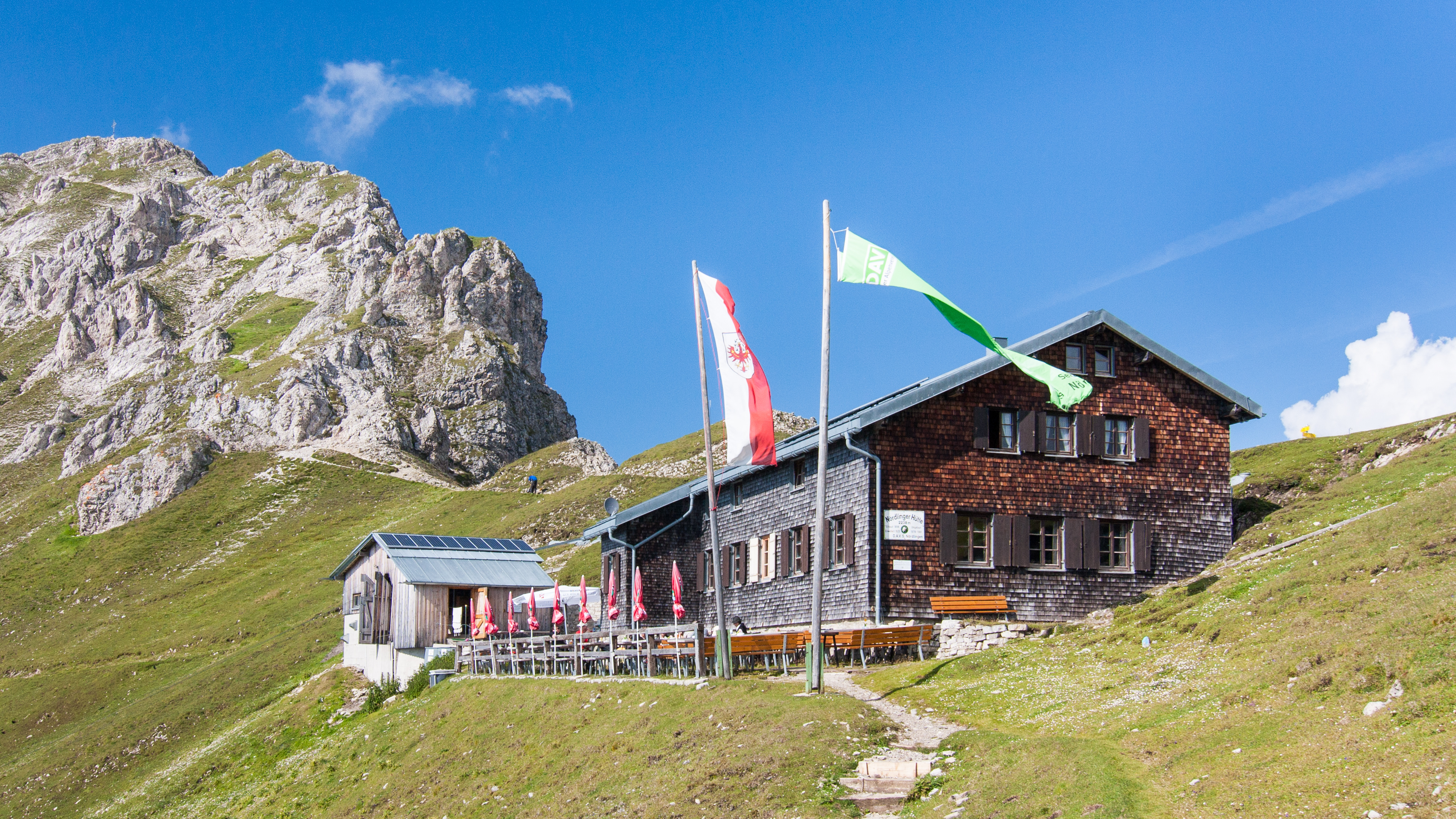
- Nördlinger Hut (2010)
- Interactive map of the Nördlinger Hut area

General information
- Coordinates: 47°19′12″N 11°14′12″E
- Owner: Nördlingen branch of the DAV

The Nördlinger Hut (German: Nördlinger Hütte) is an Alpine Club hut belonging to the German Alpine Club that is situated at a height of 2,238 m (AA) south of the summit of the Reither Spitze in the Austrian state of Tyrol. It is thus the highest refuge hut in the entire Karwendel range. It is located in the westernmost part of the Karwendel Alps, the Erlspitze Group, above the village and ski resort of Seefeld. From the hut there are expansive views over the Stubai Alps, the Inn valley and the Wetterstein Mountains.

== Use ==
Thanks to its location and the many tour options that start here, the hut is popular with climbers and hikers as a base for tours over several days, for example crossings of the Karwendel and various summit ascents. It is also used as a destination for day trippers who reach it from the top station of the Härmelekopf cable car. The hut is mainly used, however, as an important base for summit attempts, hut treks and occasional climbing tours. Due to the high risk of avalanches in the surrounding area the hut is not suitable for ski touring; it has no winter room and is closed during the winter.

== Summit ascents ==
- Reither Spitze (2,374 m (AA)) up its south flank, easy hut summit, time: 30 minutes.
- Seefelder Spitze (2,221 m (AA)) via the Reither Spitze, challenging, time: 1½ hours.
- Freiungen (2,332 m (AA)), challenging, time: 1½ hours.
- Kuhljochspitze (2,297 m (AA)) via the Freiungen mountain path, challenging, time: 2½ hours.

== Literature ==
- Walter Klier: Alpine Club Guide Karwendel alpin, 15th edn., 2005, Bergverlag Rudolf Rother, Munich, ISBN 3-7633-1121-1
- Dieter Gunn (1997). Around the Zugspitze, Munich, Rother Verlag, pp. 94-96.
