= Härmelekopf =

Mountain in the Austrian state of Tyrol

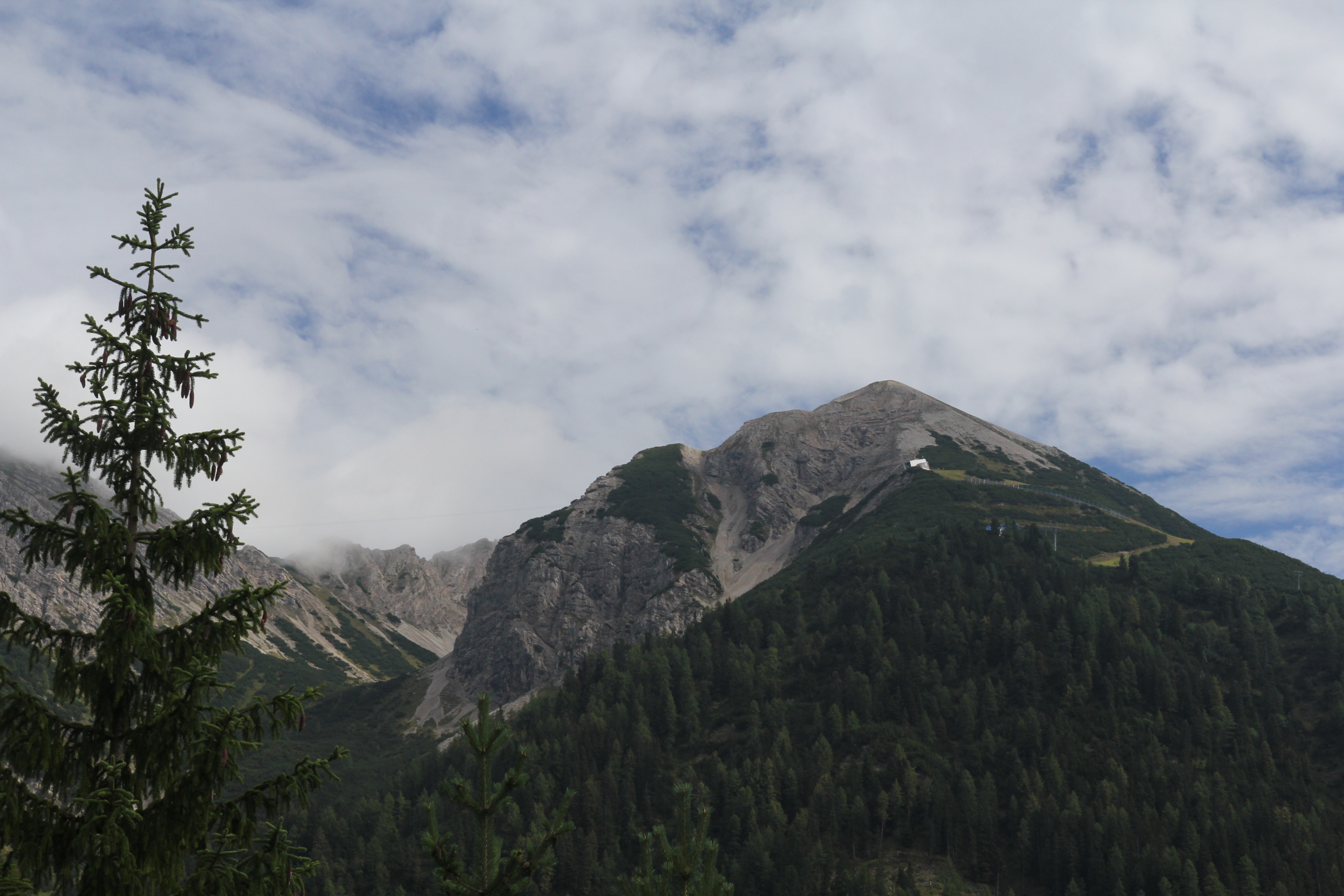
- The Härmelekopf seen from the Rosshütte area to the north.

Highest point
- Elevation: 2,224 m (AA)
- Coordinates: 47°18′30″N 11°13′41″E

Geography
- Location within Austria
- Location: near Seefeld; Innsbruck Land, Tyrol (Austria)
- Parent range: Karwendel

The Härmelekopf is a mountain northeast of Seefeld in Tirol in the Karwendel Alps in the Austrian state of Tyrol. It is 2,224 metres high.

== Ascent ==
About 400 metres from the summit of the Härmelekopf is the top station of the Härmelekopfbahn cable car, from where there is a steep and difficult path to the top which then continues along an arête to the Reither Spitze. Another easier path leads from the top station and then forks, the left branch making for the Reither Scharte and the right branch for the Nördlinger Hut.

== Industry ==
On the western side of the mountain, at between 1,500 and 1,700 metres, are the remains of old mine workings.

== Skiing ==
The western side of the Härmelekopf is also part of the Rosshütte ski area. In addition to the cable car from the Rosshütte itself, there are lifts from Seefeld (the Hochangerbahn) and the Reiterjoch Alm (the Reiteralmbahn).

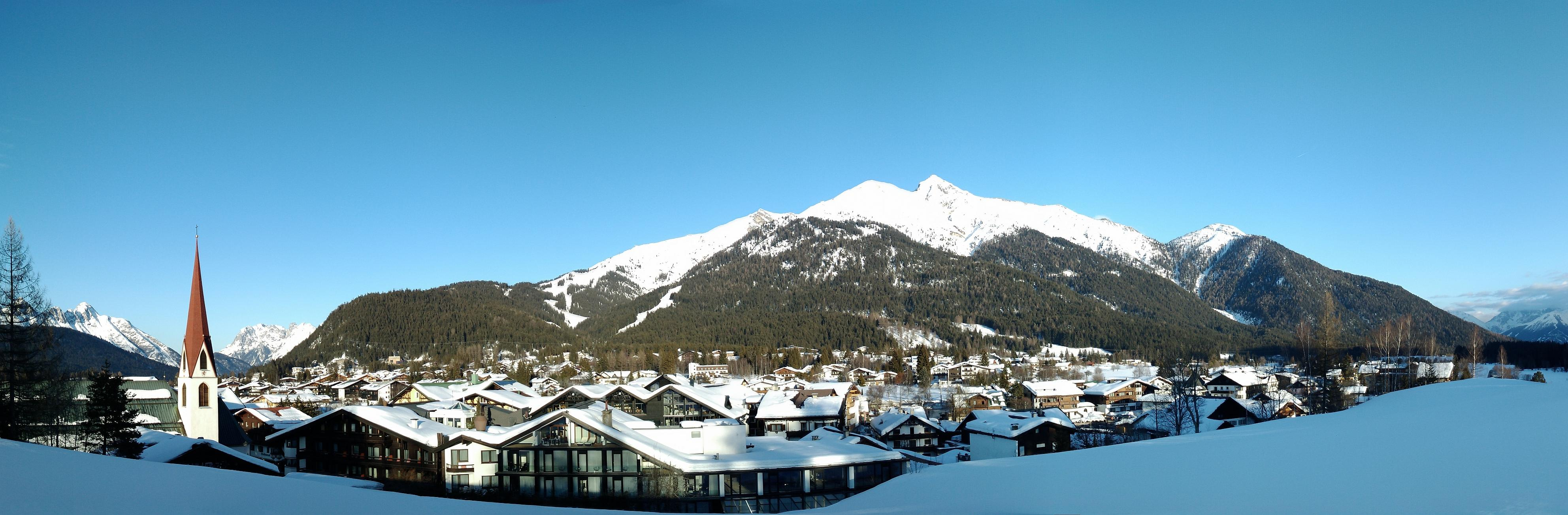
The Karwendel range above Seefeld. From the left: the Seefelder Spitze, Härmelekopf, Reither Spitze and Rauenkopf
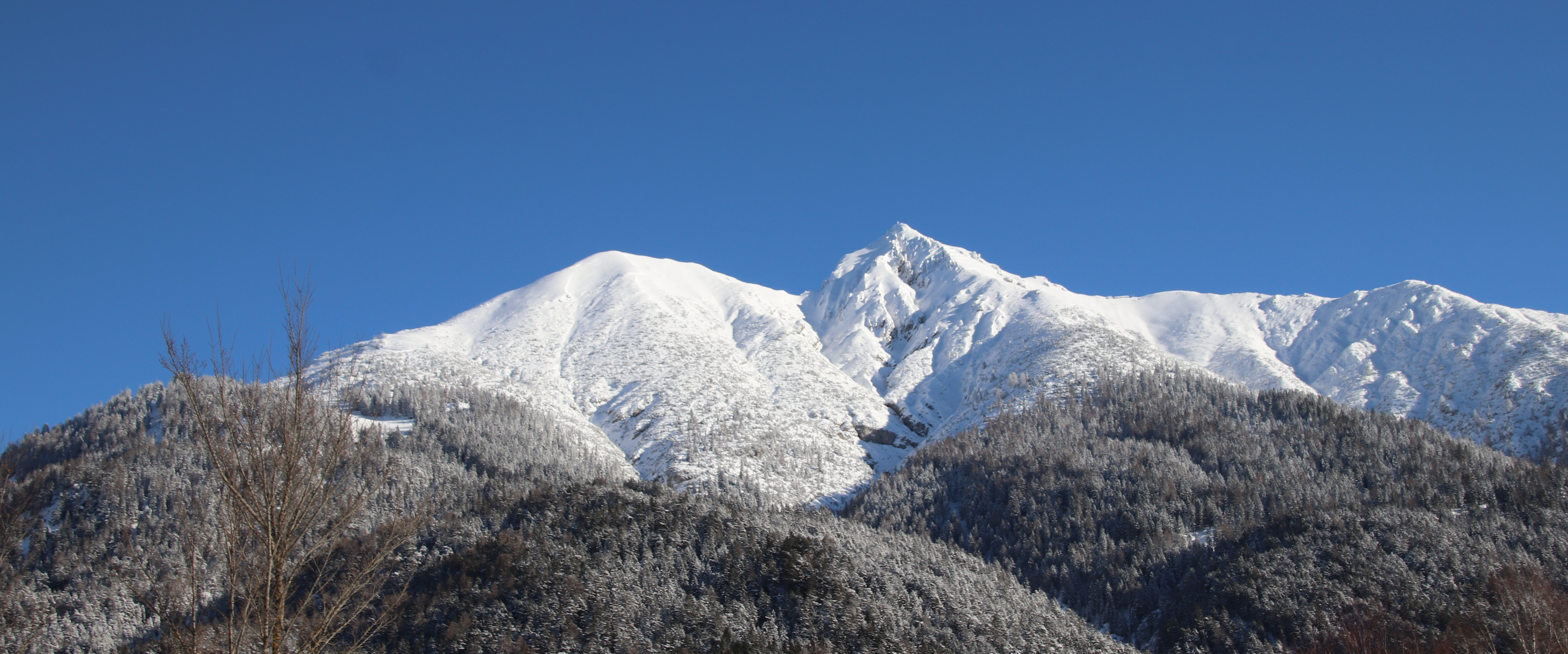
Panorama of the Austrian mountain peaks Härmelekopf and Reither Spitze. View from Wildsee, Seefeld, Tirol.
