= Reither Spitze =

Austrian mountain

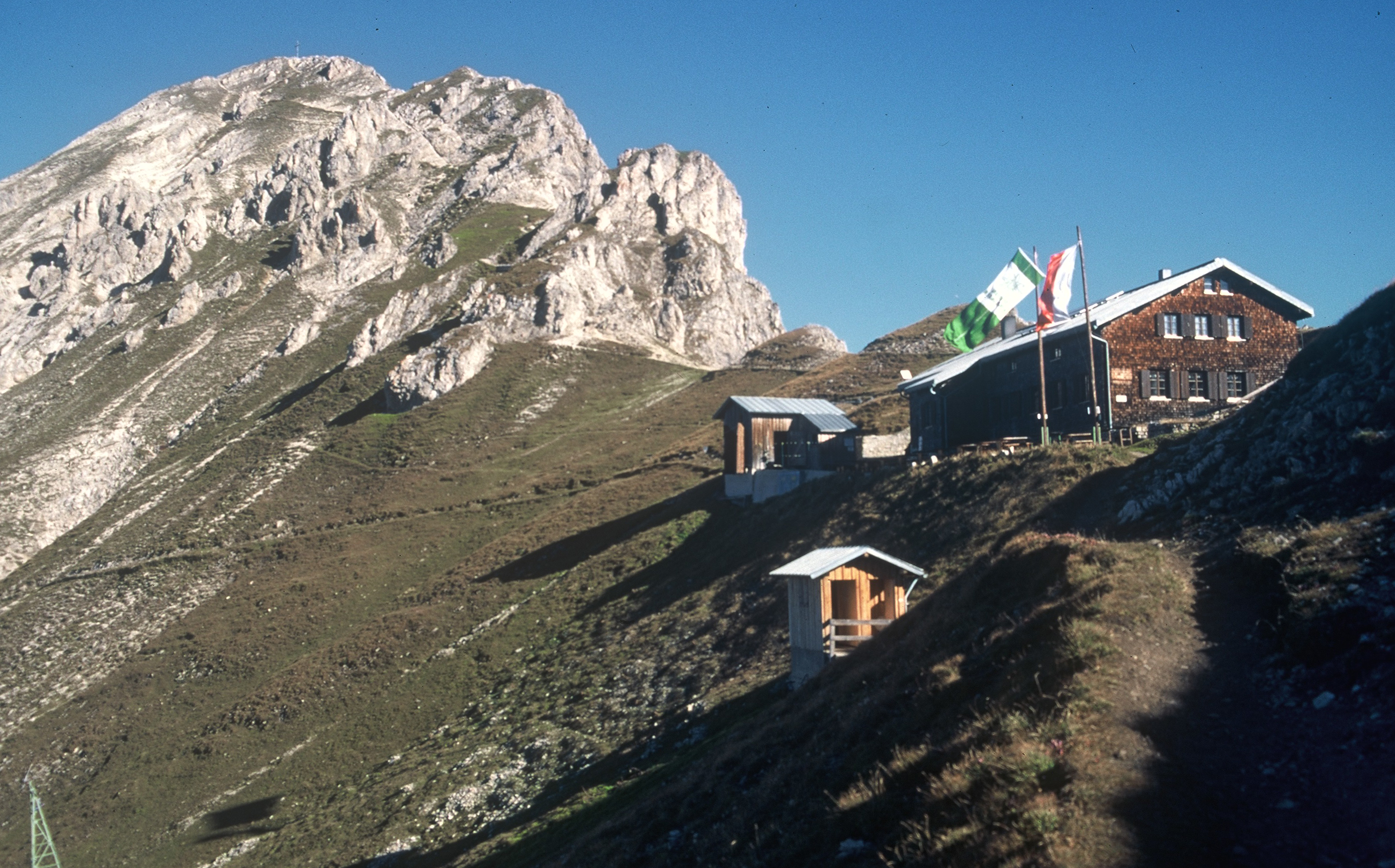
- View of the Reither Spitze and Nördlinger Hut from the south

Highest point
- Elevation: 2,374 m (AA) (7,789 ft)
- Prominence: 2,374-2,096 m ↓ Ursprungsattel
- Isolation: 3.7 km → Erlspitze
- Coordinates: 47°19′23″N 11°14′10″E

Geography
- Location within Austria
- Location: Tyrol, Austria
- Parent range: Erlspitze Group, Karwendel

Geology
- Rock type: Dolomite

Climbing
- Normal route: From the Nördlinger Hut

The Reither Spitze is a mountain in the Karwendel in the Austrian federal state of Tyrol that, thanks to its location at the southwestern end of the Erlspitze Group, is particularly well known for its great views of the surrounding area from its summit. Its name is derived the village of Reith bei Seefeld, which lies at its southwestern foot.

The Schlossbach, a tributary of the River Inn, rises on the mountainside.

== Ascent ==
The summit of the Reither Spitze may be reached in a 20-minute climb from the Nördlinger Hut to the south. The Nördlinger Hut is an hour's walk from the top station of the cable car on the Härmelekopf; from the Härmelekopf one can also ascend the Reither Spitze directly via the Reither Joch (sure-footedness required). An ascent from Reith bei Seefeld or Seefeld takes about three hours. From the Seefelder Spitze, the Reither Spitze may be reached on an easy path (sure-footedness required) or directly along the connecting arête, a routed graded at UIAA level III difficulty.

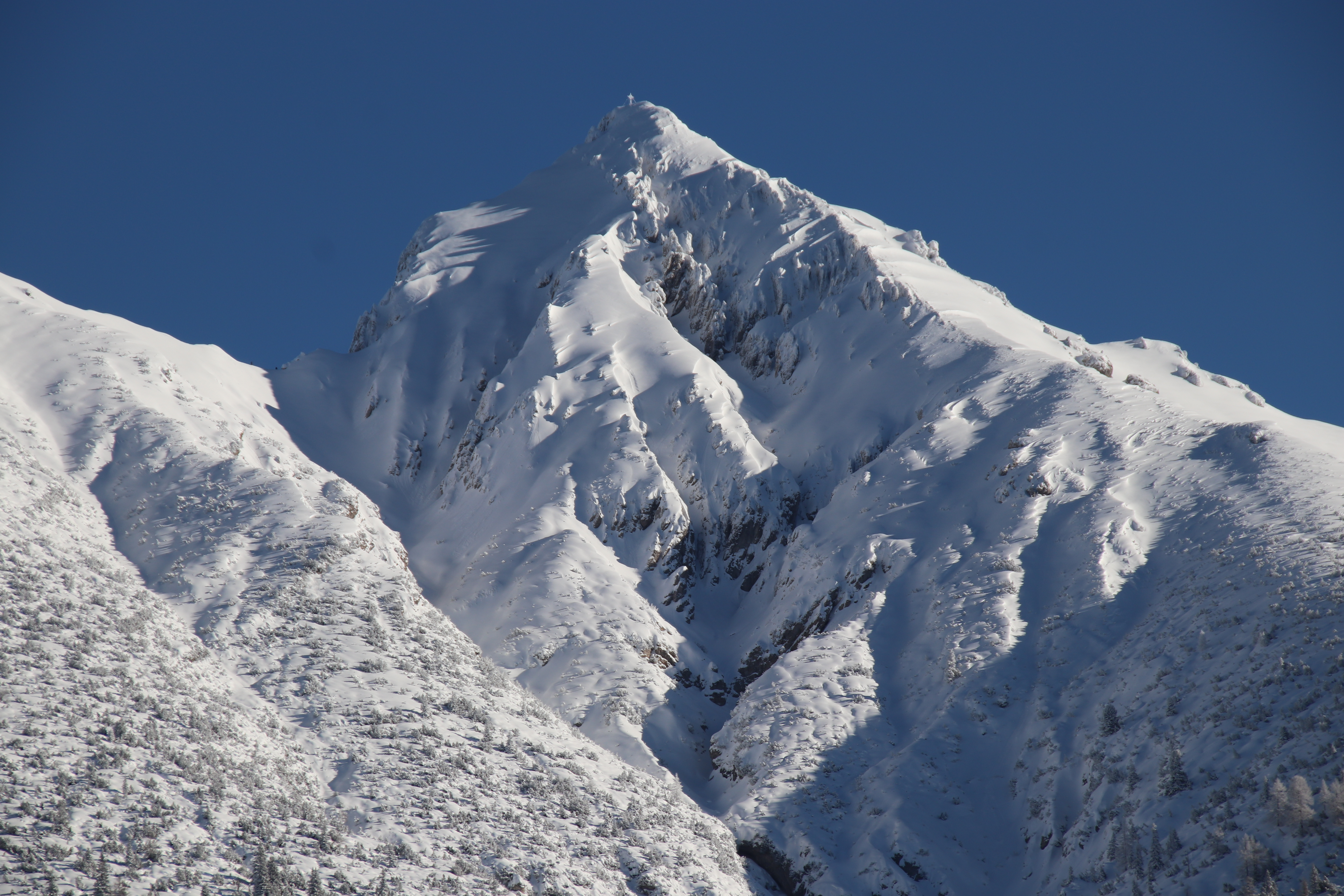
Reither Spitze in winter

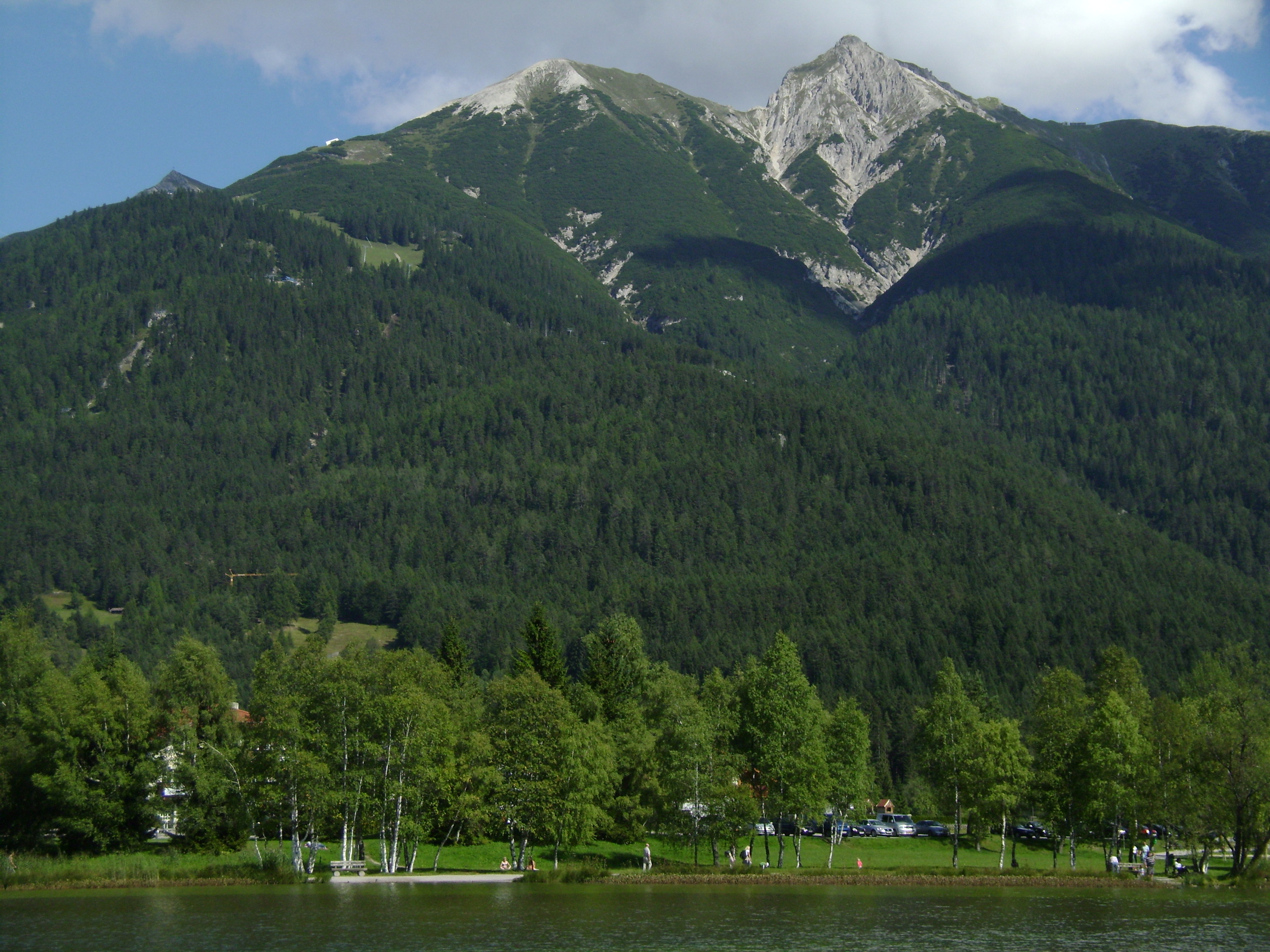
The Reither Spitze from Seefeld

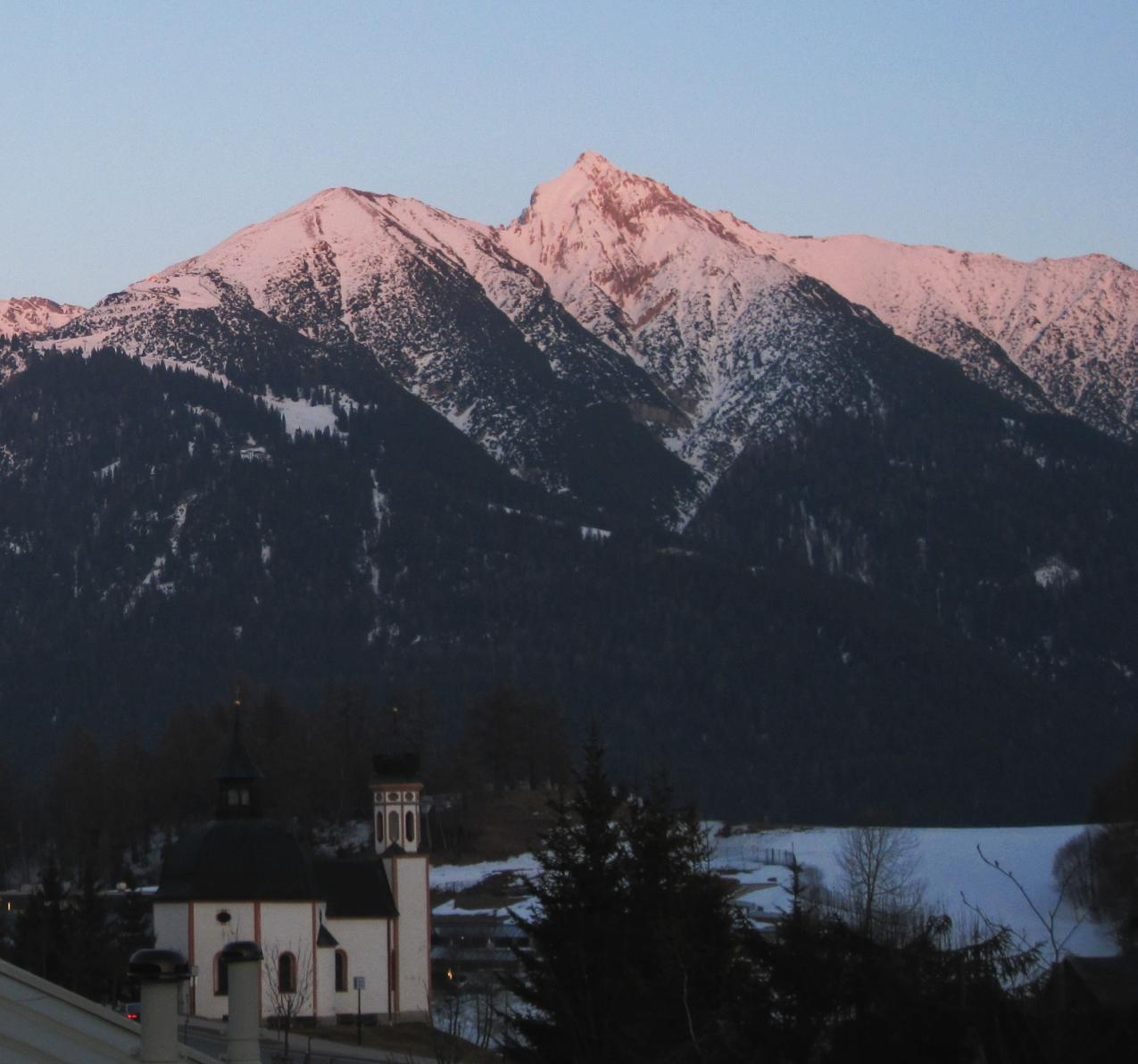
The Härmelekopf and Reither Spitze in winter

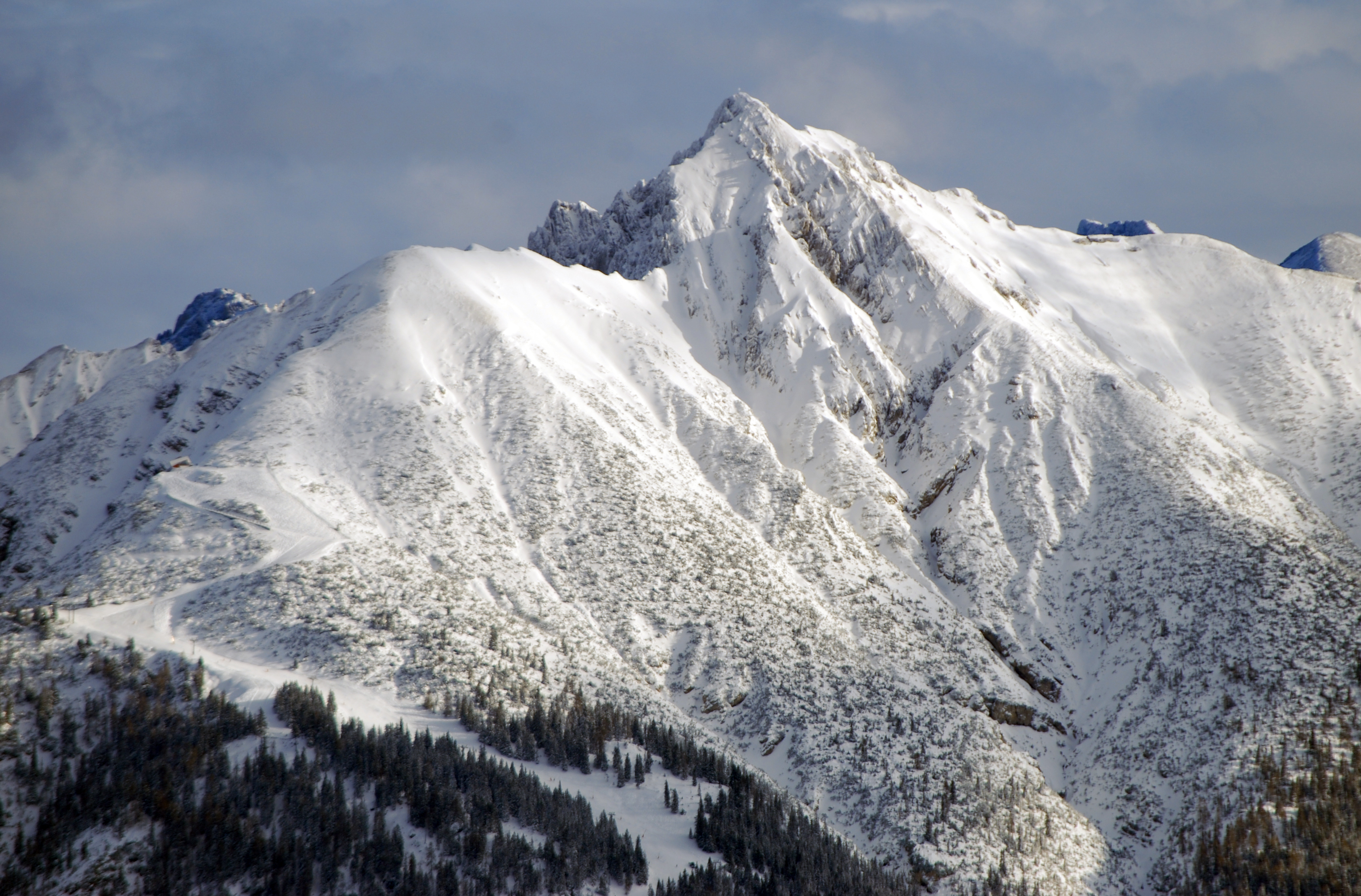
View from the foot of the Hohe Munde

== Geology ==
The summit of the Reither Spitze and the arête of the Seefelder Spitze (2,221 m (AA)) are made of main dolomite rock. This zone of the upper main dolomite is surrounded by a ring-shaped zone of oil-bearing and partly fossil-bearing Seefeld beds. As a result of fish fossils, the oil-bearing slate from this region is also called Ichthyol Slate after the Old Greek word for fish, ichthys (ἰχθύς). These rocks were quarried in various places around the Reither Spitze for the extraction of Ichthyol. The main quarry area was at the foot of the Reither Spitze southeast of Seefeld in the area of the Reither Jochalm.

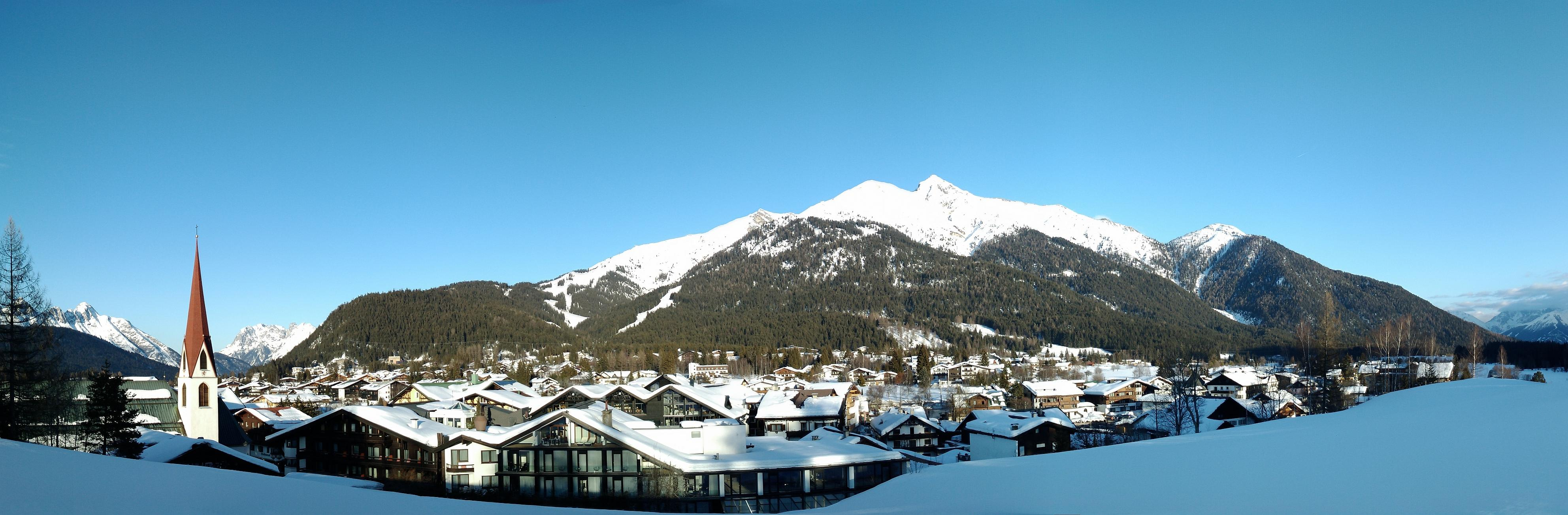
The Seefelder Joch, Seefelder Spitze, Härmelekopf, Reither Spitze and Rauenkopf. Foreground: Seefeld
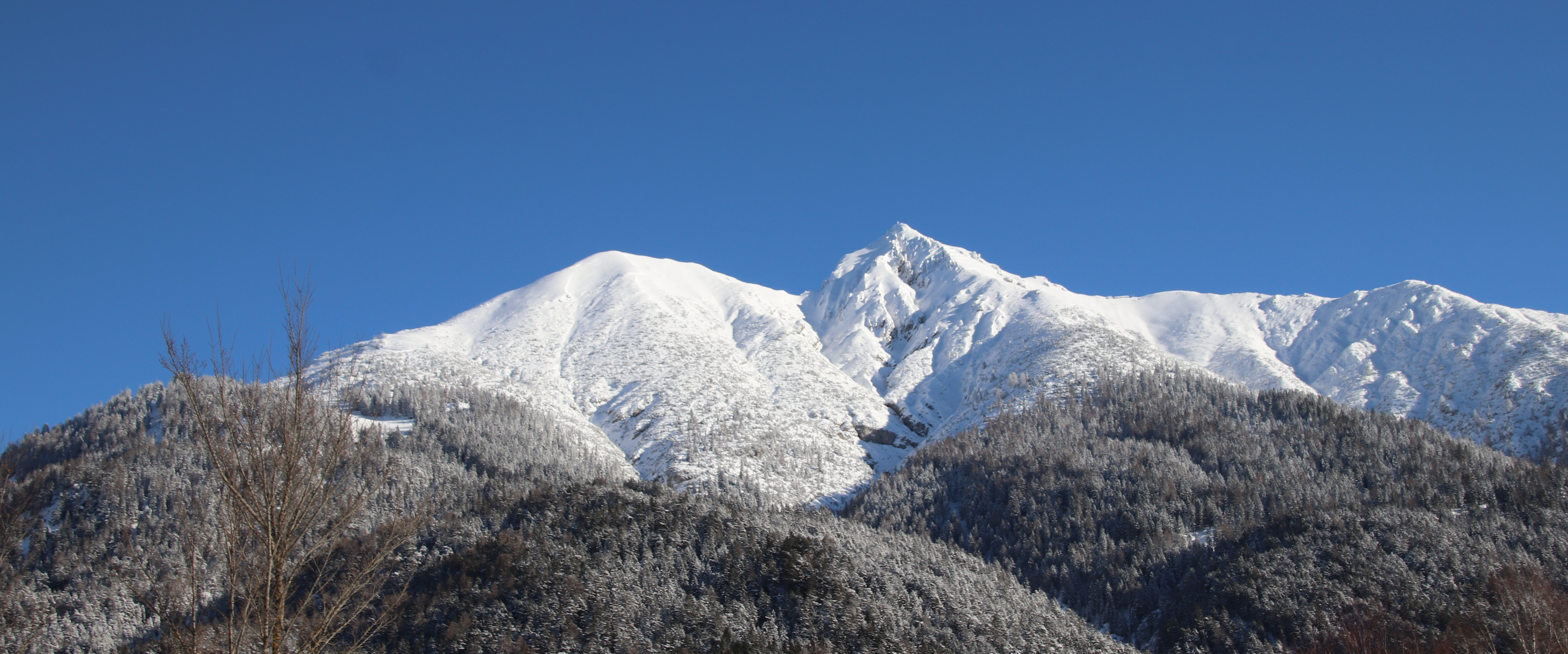
Panorama of the Austrian mountain peaks Härmelekopf and Reither Spitze. View from Wildsee, Seefeld, Tirol.
