= Kuhljochspitze =

Mountain in Austria

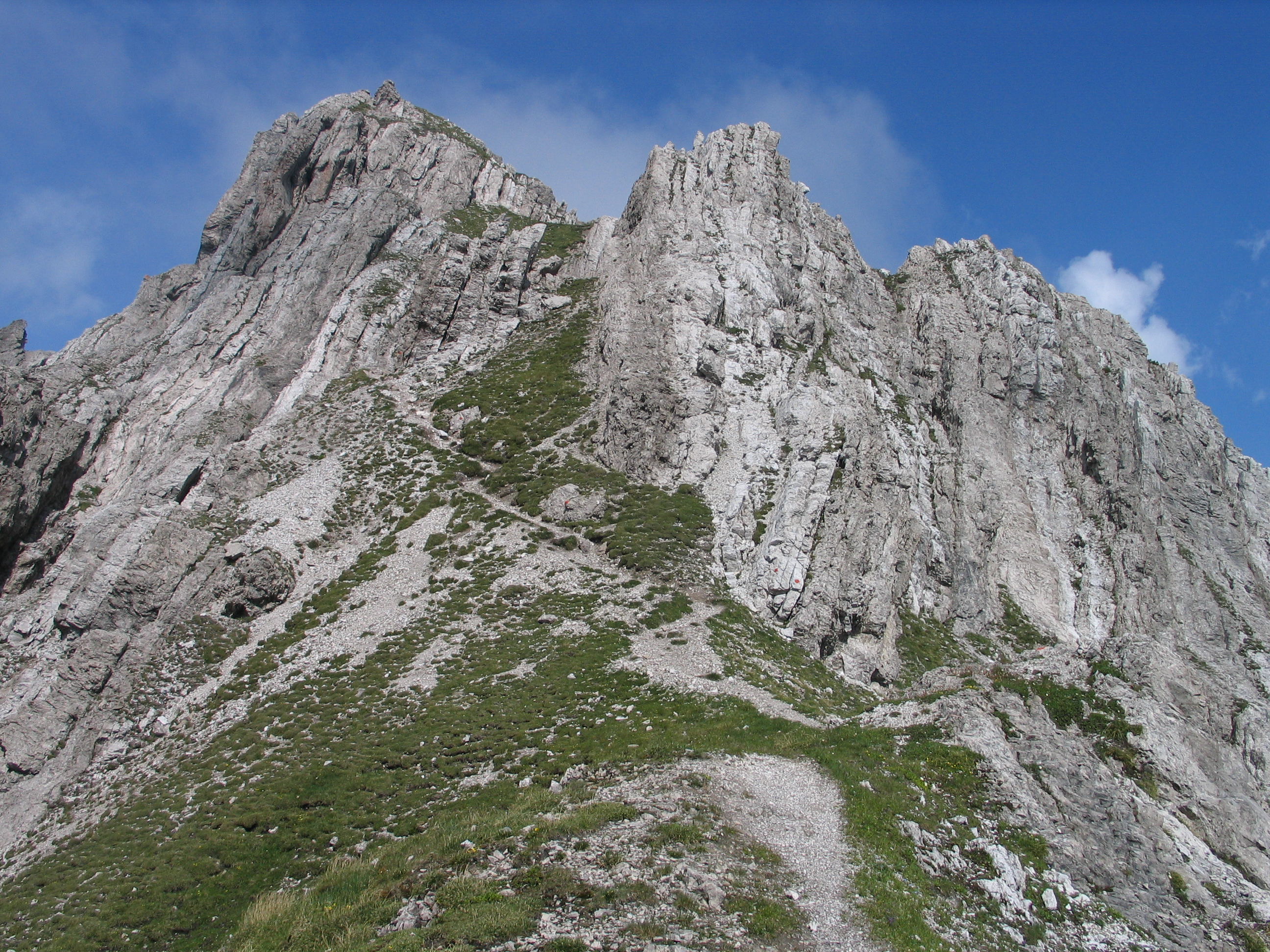
- The Kuhljochspitze

Highest point
- Elevation: 2,297 m (AA) (7,536 ft)
- Prominence: 2,297-2,171 m ↓ Kuhljoch Saddle
- Isolation: 1.0 km → Erlspitze
- Coordinates: 47°18′53″N 11°16′17″E

Geography
- Location within Austria
- Location: Tyrol, Austria
- Parent range: Erlspitze Group, Karwendel

Geology
- Rock age: Norian
- Rock type: main dolomite

Climbing
- First ascent: 23 May 1886 by Julius Pock and Felix Griensteidl (tourists)
- Normal route: Path from the Solsteinhaus; short grade I climbing sections

The Kuhljochspitze is a mountain, 2,297 m (AA) high, in the Erlspitze Group in the Karwendel Alps in Austria.

== Ascent ==
The normal route runs from the Solsteinhaus (1,805 m (AA)) along the Freiungen Ridgeway (Freiungen-Höhenweg) to the col of Kuhljochscharte; from there the summit is attainable in 30 minutes of easy climbing.

== Literature ==
- Walter Klier: Alpenvereinsführer Karwendel alpin, 15th edn., 2005, Bergverlag Rudolf Rother, Munich, ISBN 3-7633-1121-1
