= Seefelder Spitze =

Mountain in the Austrian state of Tyrol

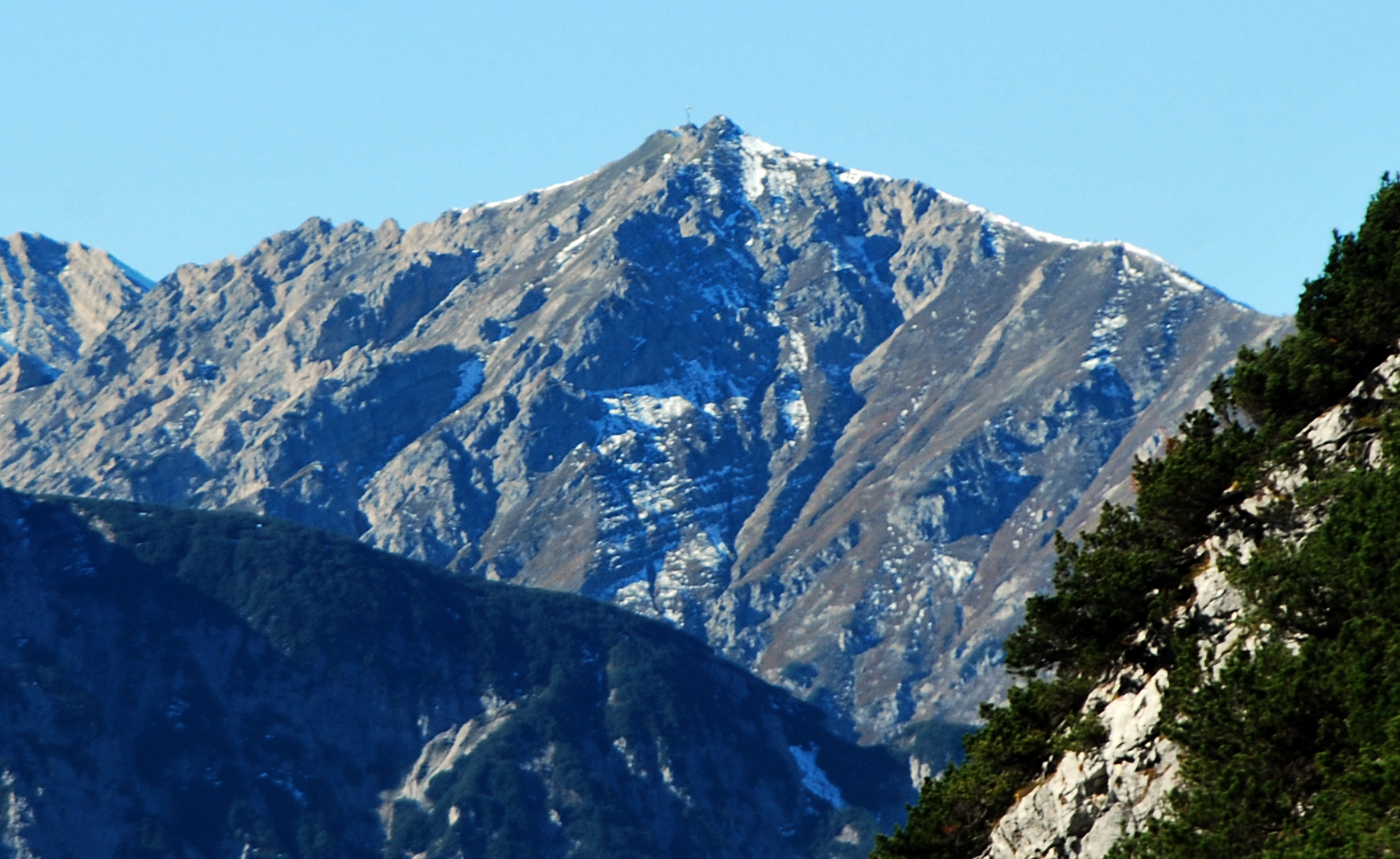
- The Seefelder Spitze from the northeast

Highest point
- Elevation: 2,221 m (AA)
- Coordinates: 47°19′58″N 11°14′15″E

Geography
- Location within Austria
- Location: near Seefeld; Innsbruck Land, Tyrol (Austria)
- Parent range: Karwendel

Climbing
- Normal route: Panorama Höhenweg via Ross Hut and Seefelder Joch

The Seefelder Spitze is a mountain east of Seefeld in Tirol in the Karwendel Alps in the Austrian state of Tyrol. It is 2,221 metres high and there is a summit cross at the top.

== Ascent ==
There is an easy waymarked route approaching from the Rosshütte to the northwest. The path runs climbs initially eastwards to the Seefelder Joch and then turns south along the ridgeline on the Panorama Höhenweg to the summit. This ridgeline has metal railings for protection in one or two places but is straightforward provided care is taken, especially when busy. The Rosshütte is at the top of a funicular from Seefeld and is connected to the Seefelder Joch by a cable car. Another, more difficult approach is from the more exposed ridgeline to the south from the direction of the Reither Spitze, and there are also unmarked tracks up the west flank.

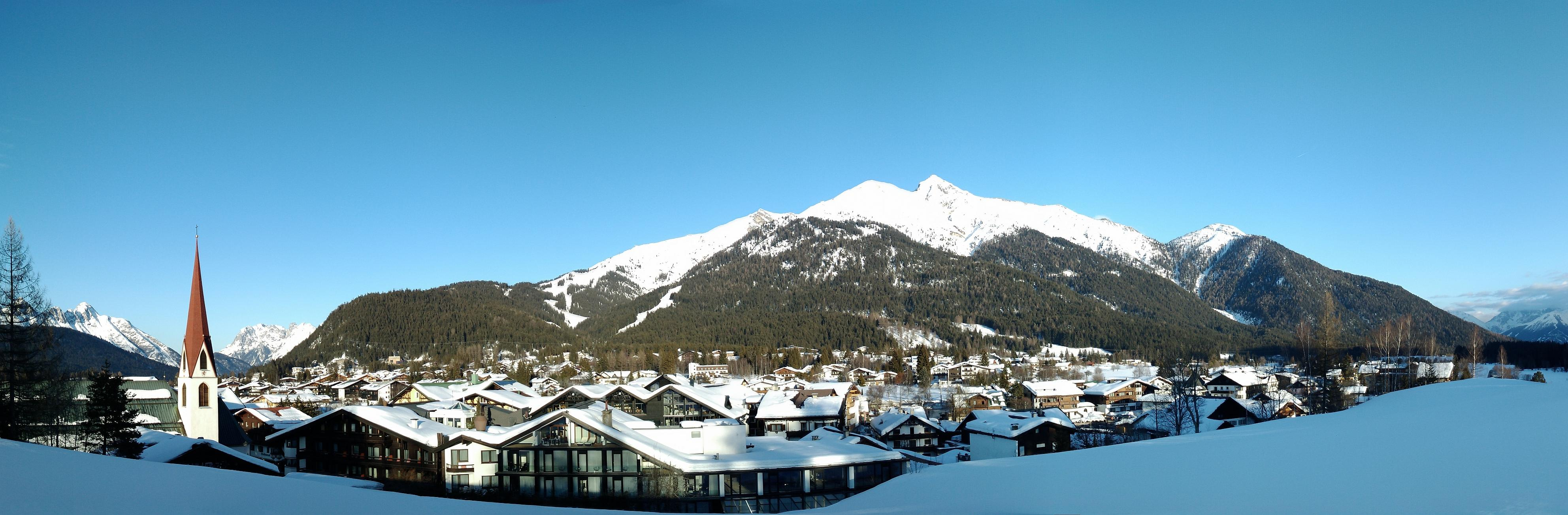
The Karwendel range above Seefeld. From the left: the Seefelder Spitze, Härmelekopf, Reither Spitze and Rauenkopf
