= Winter room =

Part of a mountain hut

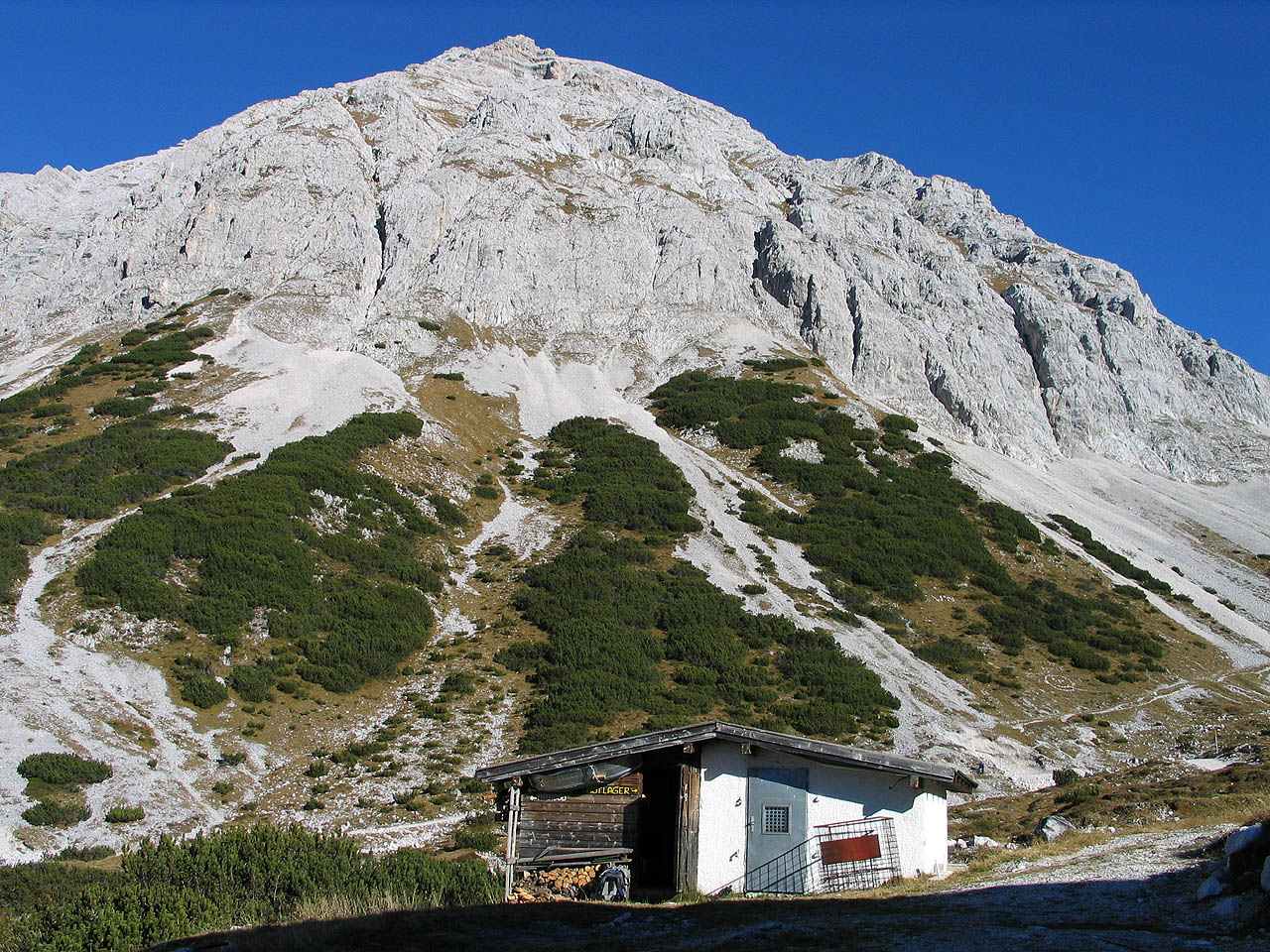
Winter room in the Pfeis Hut in front of the Stempeljochspitze, Karwendel

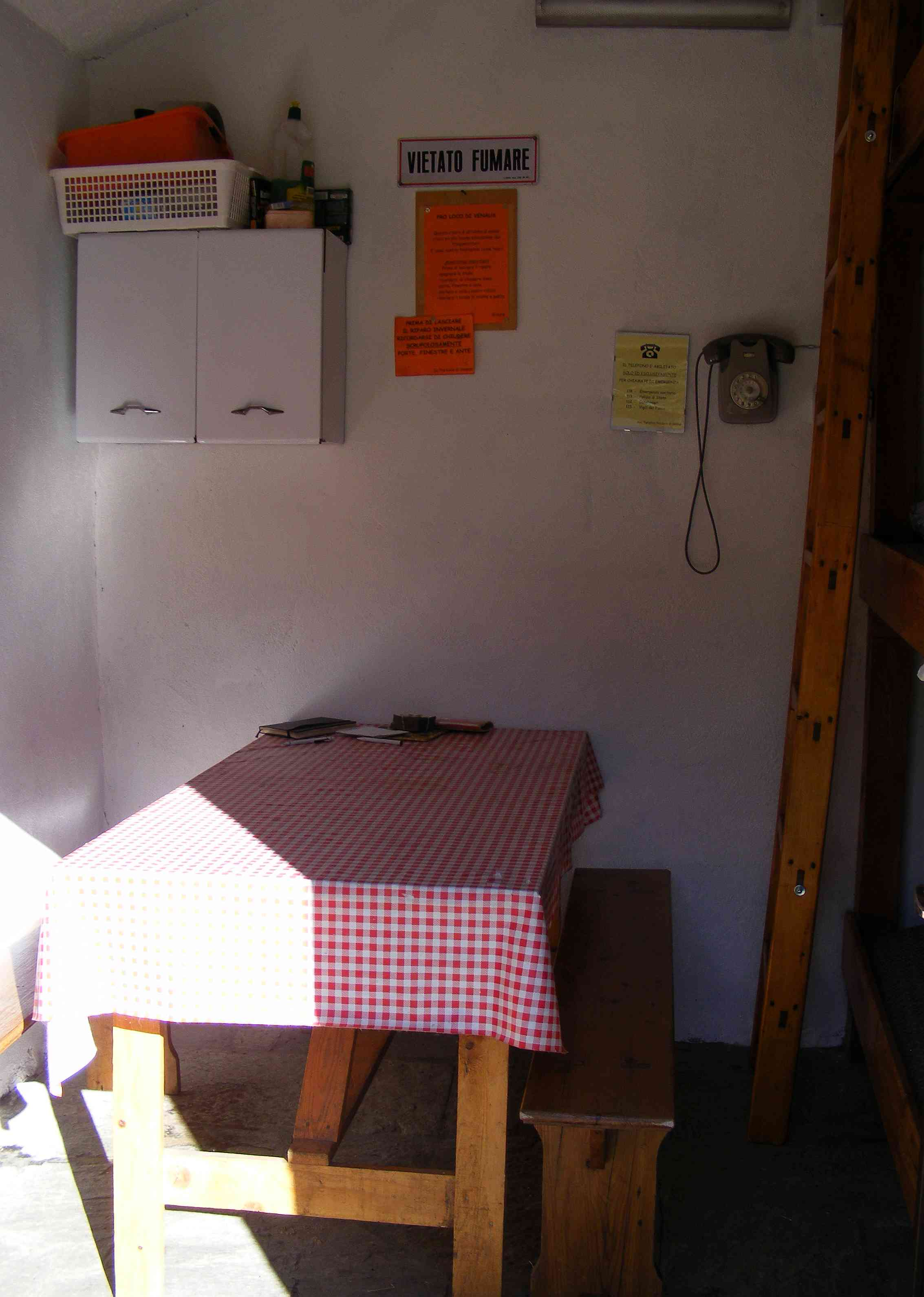
Winter room of Rifugio Avanzà (Cottian Alps)

A winter room (German: Winterraum) is found in mountain huts used by tourists that are not managed in the winter. The winter room, unlike the rest of the hut, is easily accessible and usually is either not locked or is accessible with an Alpine Club key.

A winter room may be used by climbers and hikers in the winter who are self-contained. Usually there is a stove and wood to fire it with; often there is a table as well and somewhere to sleep.

The nightly charge publicized on a poster in the hut is paid either by putting it in the money box of the winter room or may be bank-transferred directly to the branch of the Alpine Club that owns the hut.

Most of the Alpine Club huts in the Alps have a winter room.
