= Scharnitz Pass =

Scharnitz Pass Scharnitzpass / Scharnitzer Klause
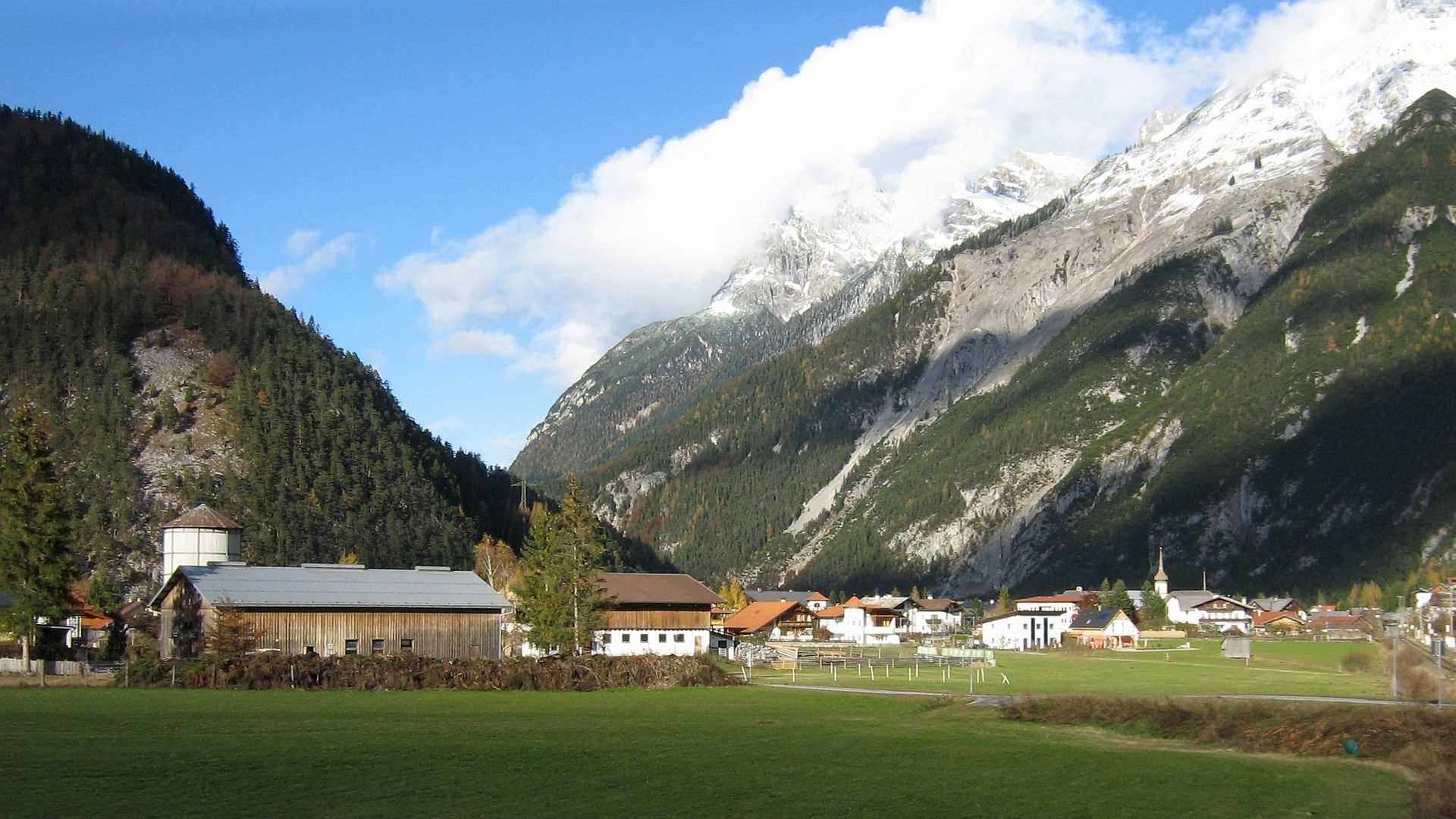
- Scharnitz Pass with Scharnitz, view from Southeast
- Interactive map of Scharnitz Pass; Scharnitzpass / Scharnitzer Klause
- Elevation: 955

Third Approach
- Range: Alps
- Coordinates: 47°23′52″N 11°16′02″E

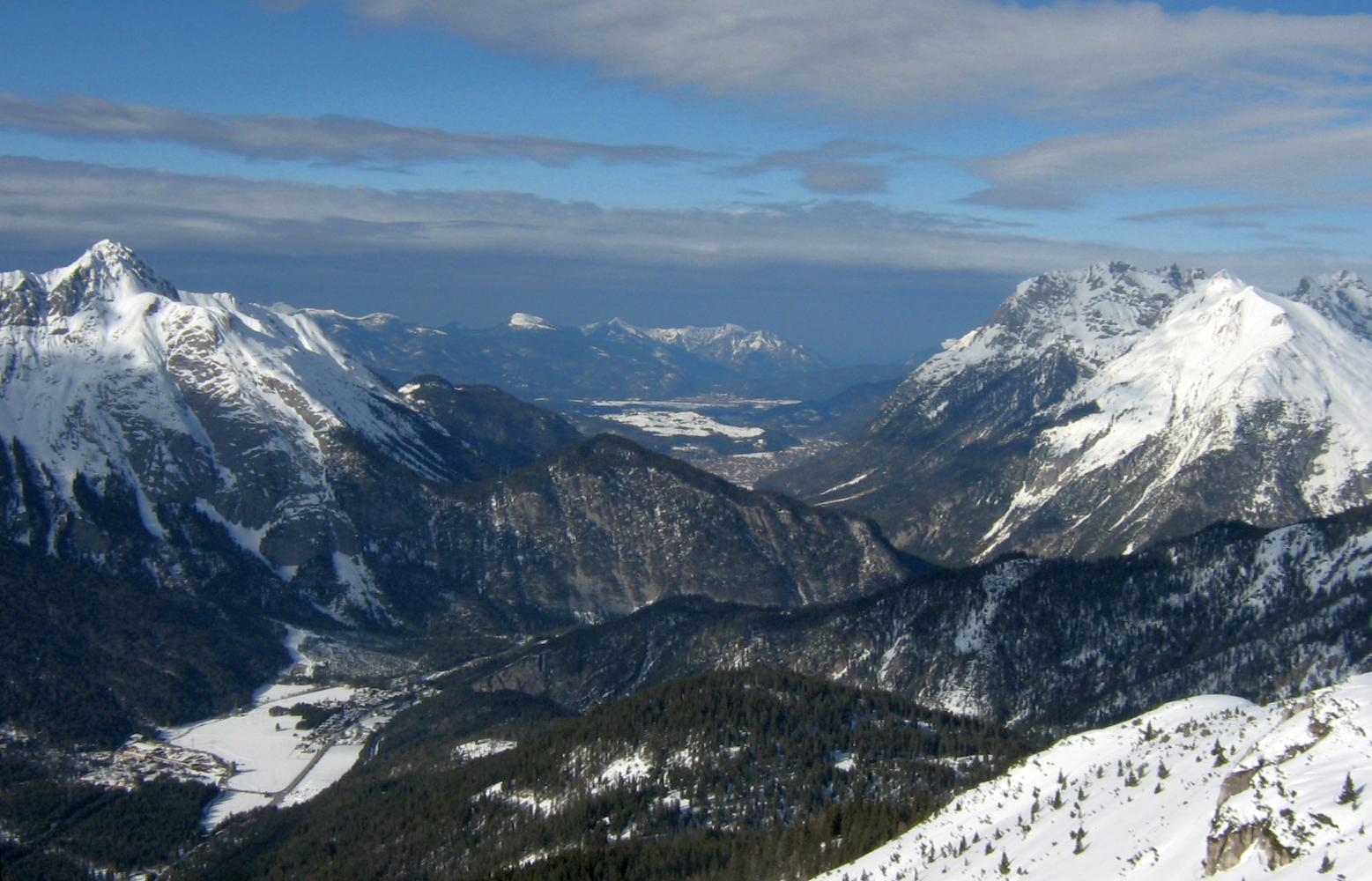
View of the pass from the south, Lower left: the Seefelder Straße (B 177) near Gießenbach; background: Mittenwald; right: the Rotwandlspitze (with the Scharnitz Pass below and left of it)

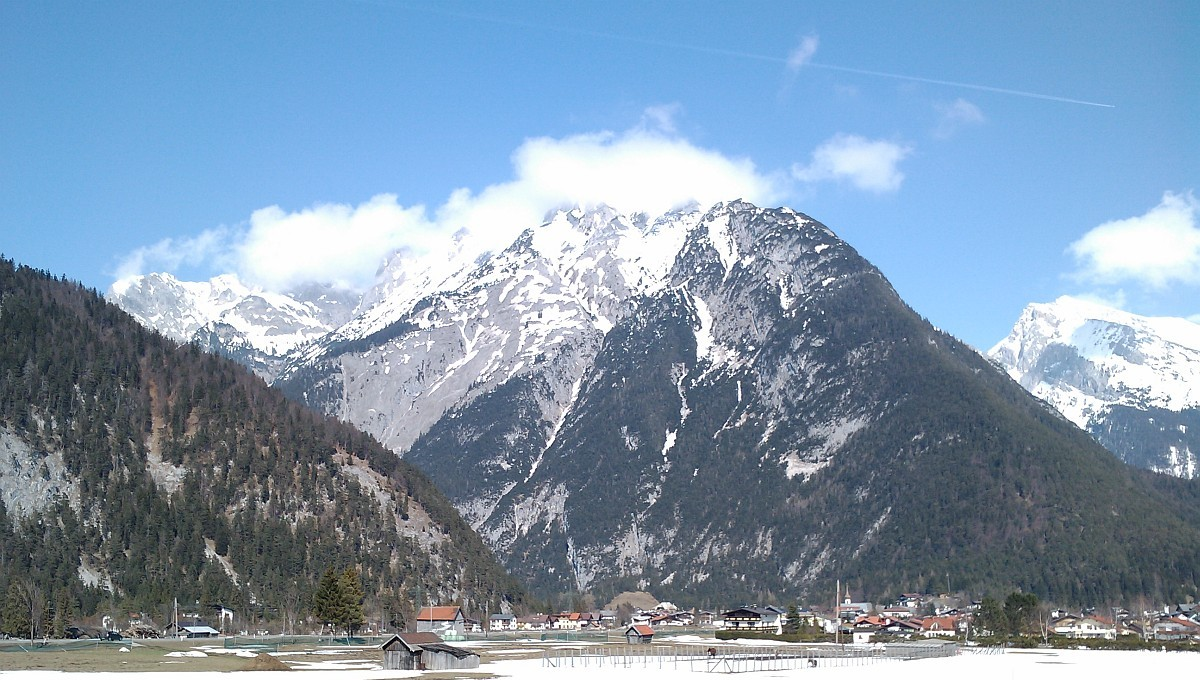
Scharnitz Pass with view of the west side of the Brunnensteinspitze (subpeak of the Rotwandlspitze), the Marchklamm (and Schneerest) runs almost straight downhill. Right rear: the Pleisenspitze

The Scharnitz Pass (German: Scharnitzpass or Scharnitzer Klause) is a narrow section of the upper Isar valley in the Northern Limestone Alps. It lies at a height of about 955 m on the Austro-German border between the states of Bavaria and Tyrol. Its name derives from the village of Scharnitz immediately to the south.

== Location ==
The Scharnitz Pass lies east of the Wetterstein Mountains and west of the Karwendel. It is located in the upper valley of the River Isar between Mittenwald (923 m; Bavaria) in the north and Scharnitz (964 m; Tyrol) in the south. The Isar valley floor narrows from about 900 metres to under 300 metres as a result of the eastern flank of the Arntalköpfle (1,529 m), a subpeak of the Arnspitze Group. East of the pass rises the Rotwandlspitze (2,192 m); to the southwest of which is the Brunnensteinspitze (2,179.8 m).

== Transport ==
=== Road ===
The German B 2 federal highway, which approaches from Mittenwald to the north, and the Austrian Seefelder Straße (B 177), which runs through Scharnitz and Seefeld (Tyrol) and continues over the Seefeld Saddle, meet at the Scharnitz Pass. Both roads are part of the E 533 European Road.

=== Rail ===
Since 1912, the Mittenwald and Karwendel Railway, the line from Innsbruck over the Seefeld Saddle to Garmisch-Partenkirchen, has cut through the Scharnitz Pass.

== Reserves ==
Northwest of the Scharnitz Pass lies the German nature reserve of Riedboden (NSG-No. 00157.01; 1.46 km²), which adjoins the nature reserve of Arnspitze (00158.01; 2.22 km²). The protected area of Wettersteingebiet einschließlich Latschengürtel bei Mittenwald ("Wetterstein region including the Latschengürtel near Mittenwald", LSG-No. 391021; 86.33 km²) borders the two reserves to the north. On the east side – on the far side of the Isar, road and railway track – on the German side, lie the nature reserve of Karwendel und Karwendelvorgebirge (00171.01; 193.45 km²) and, on the Austrian side, immediately adjacent, the Ruhegebiet Eppzirl in the Natura 2000 area of Karwendel Alpine Park.

== Avalanche risk ==
The Scharnitz Pass is subject to avalanches by the gorge of Marchklamm on the state border from the west flank of the Brunnensteinspitze. When the snow reaches certain levels the road and railway line are closed and a diversion is used via Seefeld and the narrow valley of the Leutascher Ache to Mittenwald. Due to the nature reserve of Riedboden there are tight restrictions on the construction of avalanche defences and the construction of a road tunnel straight through the Arntalköpfle exiting on the German side west of the Isar was not possible. After years of discussion over various options and costings an avalanche gallery will now be built on the German side for a cost of 8.5 million euros;, the planned tunnel to the Scharnitz bypass exits on the Austrian side still in the avalanche zone.

== History ==
Under the Roman emperor, Septimius Severus (193–211), the old mule track from the Inn valley over the Seefeld Saddle to Mittenwald was consolidated into a Roman road that, as the Via Raetia ran through Partenkirchen, Oberau and Murnau to Augsburg. In the Roman road map Tabula Peutingeriana, Scarbia (Scharnitz) and Partanum (Partenkirchen) are shown as rest places and guard stations. From the Middle Ages the road has been an important trade route between Venice and Augsburg/Nuremberg (Via Imperii).

The Scharnitz Pass belonged then to the County of Werdenfels, the border between the County of Tyrol then being located at Schlossberg Castle north of Seefeld. The long-term aim of Tyrol was to push the state border north to the strategically important Scharnitz Pass. The Tyrolese achieved a partial success when, on 20 October 1500, Emperor Maximilian I and Prince-Bishop Philip of Freising ratified a treaty agreed the year before that moved the border of Tyrol to within a kilometre south of Scharnitz.

In 1633 Tyrol was granted the right to build a castle, Porta Claudia, at the Scharnitz Pass on Werdenfels territory in order to protect themselves from the advancing Swedish Army in the Thirty Years' War. By a treaty of 29 October 1656, Scharnitz and the region around the Porta Claudia were swapped for a strip of land around the Kienleithenkopf including the Karolingerhof and rights of way into the Hinterautal valley. With another treaty on 28 May 1766, Tyrol's possession of Scharnitz and the Porta Claudia was confirmed as was a strip of territory "at a musket shot's distance at all existing fortification works in the direction of Mittenwald".
