= Große Arnspitze =

Mountain in Austria and Germany

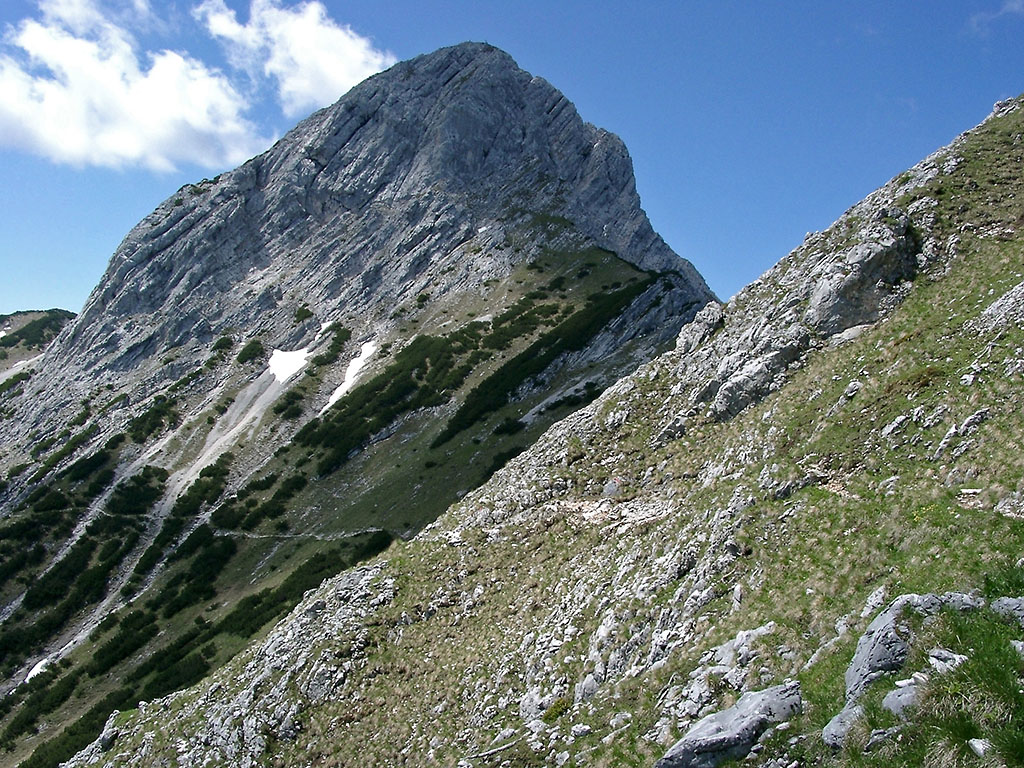
- Große Arnspitze

Highest point
- Elevation: 2,196 m (AA) (7,205 ft)
- Prominence: 1,003 m ↓ Northwest of Neuleutasch → Reither Spitze
- Isolation: 3.9 km → Upper Wettersteinspitze
- Coordinates: 47°23′50″N 11°13′21″E

Geography
- Location within Austria
- Location: Bavaria, Germany; Tyrol, Austria
- Parent range: Wettersteingebirge, Northern Limestone Alps

Geology
- Rock age: Triassic
- Mountain type: Wetterstein Limestone

Climbing
- Easiest route: Scharnitz – Arnspitzhütte – Große Arnspitze

The Große Arnspitze is the highest peak in the Arnspitze Group in the Wettersteingebirge mountains. It is located west of Scharnitz in Austria. The border between Germany and Austria runs over its summit.

The normal climbing route, Weg 851, runs from Scharnitz westwards and below the Ahrntalköpfle to the Riedberg. Below this mountain the path bends to the southwest from the Arnspitzhütte, whence it heads northwest to the summit.

== Sources ==
- Kompass Wander-, Bike und Skitourenkarte: Blatt 25 Zugspitze, Mieminger Kette (1:50.000). Kompass-Karten, Innsbruck 2008, ISBN 978-3-85491-026-8
