= Schlossberg Castle (Seefeld in Tirol) =

- Burg Schlossberg
- Seefeld in Tirol
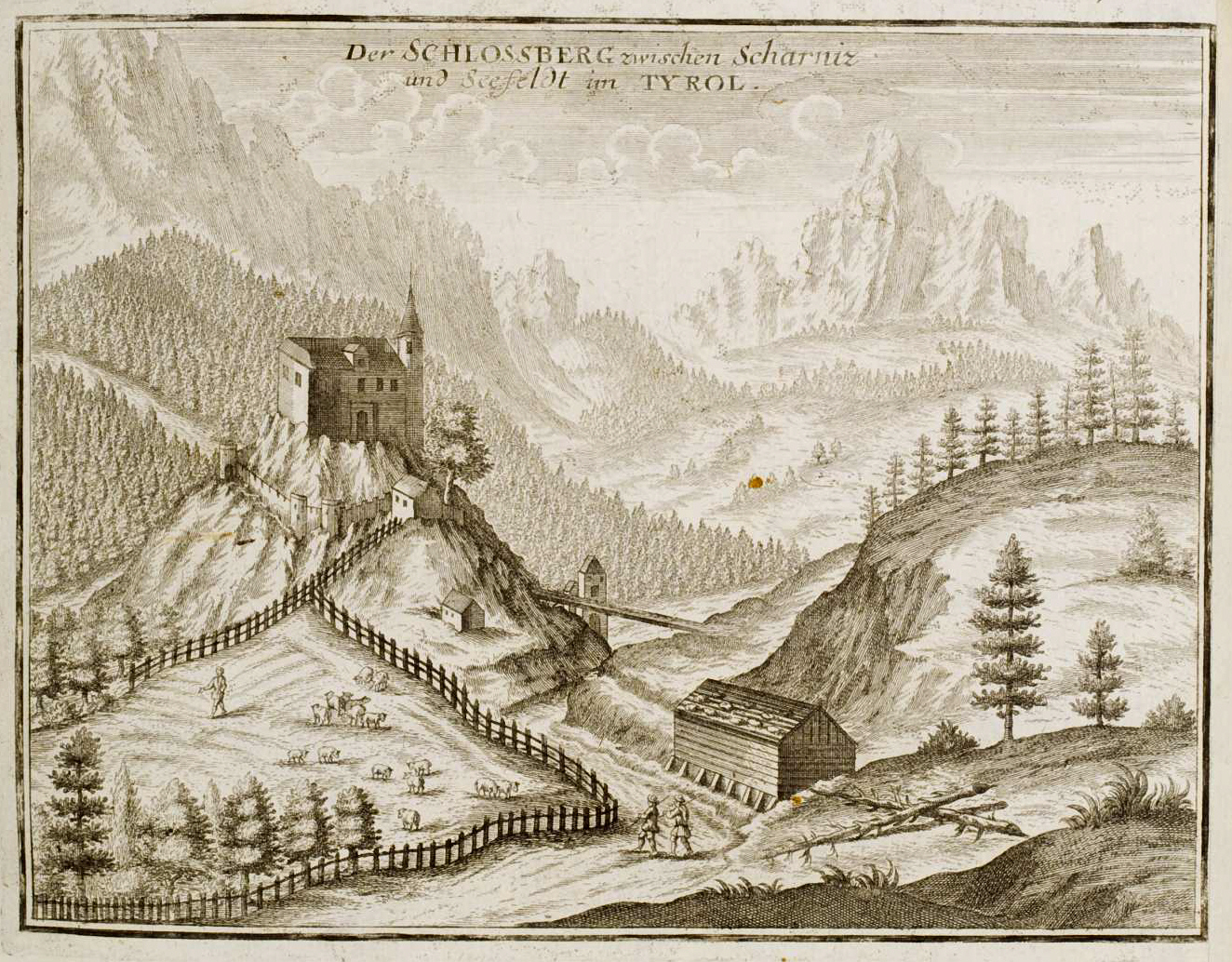
- Schlossberg Castle around 1700

Site information
- Type: hill castle
- Code: AT-7
- Condition: burgstall (no above-ground ruins)

Location
- Coordinates: 47°20′36″N 11°12′09″E

Site history
- Built: before 1248

Garrison information
- Occupants: counts

Schlossberg Castle (German: Burg Schlossberg) is a ruined toll castle in the municipality of Seefeld in Tirol in the district of Innsbruck Land in the Austrian state of Tyrol.

== History ==
After the death of the last member of the House of Andechs, Otto II and his successor, Count Albert III of Tyrol who died without male issue there was a division of inheritance in 1253 between Count Meinhard III of Gorizia (Meinhard I of Tyrol) and Count Gebhard VI Hirschberg; the areas north of the Inn went to the latter, including castrum Slozperch. Since this castle was designated as being owned by the Andechs family, it is assumed that it was built by them in the period before 1248. Certainly by 1281 (and therefore before the official transition of Hirschberg estates to Count Meinhard II, the son of Meinhard I, Gorizian-Tyrolean ministeriales appear here. Albert and Rüdiger, sons of the Eberlins of Schlossberg and grandsons of Conrad of Schlossberg are entrusted here with the hereditary castle-guard (Burghut) of the castle. This family were lords of Eben near Inzing. The family died out with Rüdiger of Eben, but also called themselves von Schlossberg even after losing the responsibility of the castle-guard. Towards the end of the 13th century the castle was further expanded, as is evidenced by various bills. In 1284 it was transferred from the counts of Eschenlohe to the counts of Tyrol and formed its border fortification with the County of Werdenfels.

The ecclesiastical divisions also followed this border: Scharnitz belonged to the Bishopric of Freising, Seefeld and Oberleutasch to the Bishopric of Brixen. Nevertheless the County of Werdenfels, maintained territorial claims up to the outskirts of Seefeld, citing the bishopric's borders of 1060 and later, unilateral, boundary records. The aim of the County of Tyrol was, by contrast, to push the state border up to the strategically important Scharnitz Pass.

In 1314 the office of castle-guard was held by Hildebrand Perchtinger from Sistrans. From him it went in 1317 to Johannes von Liebenberg and then, in 1319/20, to Heinrich Perchtinger. In 1346 Heinrich Stöckel was appointed. At the outbreak of the War of the Tyrolean Succession in 1335 the castle, as an important border fortification, was further fortified and a tax, the steura nova raised to pay for it. In spite of these precautions, the castle was conquered in 1365 and 1368 by Bavarian troops, but was recaptured shortly afterwards by a Tyrolean contingent under the leadership of Petermann of Schenna, Burgrave of Tyrol. In the Treaty of Schärding in 1369 the castle was returned to the joint regents, Duke Albert III and Leopold of Austria.

In 1376 Gebhard von Weer is mentioned as the superintendent (Pfleger). In 1384–1393 he was followed by Oswald Milser, who had become known thanks to the legend of the miracle of the host in Seefeld. From this time arose the local name of Milser Schlößl for the castle. In 1421, Hans Ramung is the superintendent here, and then Hans Erber (1426), Burghard von Windeck (1435) and Mathias Gelter (1444). In 1455, Duke Sigismund enfeoffed the Schloßberg to his nephew, Ulrich, Count of Cilli. He appears not to have been there long because as early as 1460 another superintendent, Burghard von Hausen, was in charge and he extended the castle at the behest of Sigismund. After the death of Burghard around 1478/80 Pankraz Hahn von Hahnberg became superintendent, then Paul Stickl (before 1481), Simon Pfab (1486/87) and Wolfgang von Windeck. Due to an earthquake in 1492 the castle was badly damaged, which led to complaints by its latest superintendent, Ulrich Hammerspach (died 1496).

On 20 October 1500, Sigismund's successor, Maximilian I and Prince-Bishop Philip of Freising ratified the treaty agreed the year before which saw the border of Tyrol moved northwards to a kilometre in front of Scharnitz.

Under Hammerspach's successor, Hans von Zwingenburg, the well piping was replaced in 1510/12 and building damage repaired. But the next superintendents, Nikolaus Mathias and Peter von Rada, complained of serious shortcomings. In 1547 the castle-guard was taken over by Christian Schwärzel. The construction work started by him was continued, after an interruption, by his successor in 1560, Alexander Gabelowitsch né Sandri. During the invasion of Tyrol by Elector Maurice of Saxony the castle was in good defensive order. It was not captured, but its own soldiers lost a lot here. In 1560 another new superintendent was appointed, Martin Fuchs, who also made a lot of complaints about the poor state of the building to the state treasury. These ended under the next incumbent, Johann Gwarientis (from 1569), because Archduke Ferdinand of Tyrol underwrote the castle in 1586 with all the estate of the parish of Seefeld. The priest was incorporated in 1604 into the Augustine hermitage monastery in Seefeld and there was no longer a warden living in the castle itself.

In 1633, after Tyrol had received permission from the Prince-Bishopric of Freising to build a fortification in the narrow section of the valley at Scharnitz, the subsequent Porta Claudia, Schlossberg Castle lost its importance and rapidly fell into ruins. In 1728 it was described as completed ruined and uninhabited. Around 1800 there were still a few outer walls, but by 1846 only low remains were left, probably because the nearby farmers had carted the stone away for their buildings. In 1911/12 the rest of the castle was demolished and used for the construction of the Mittenwald Railway.

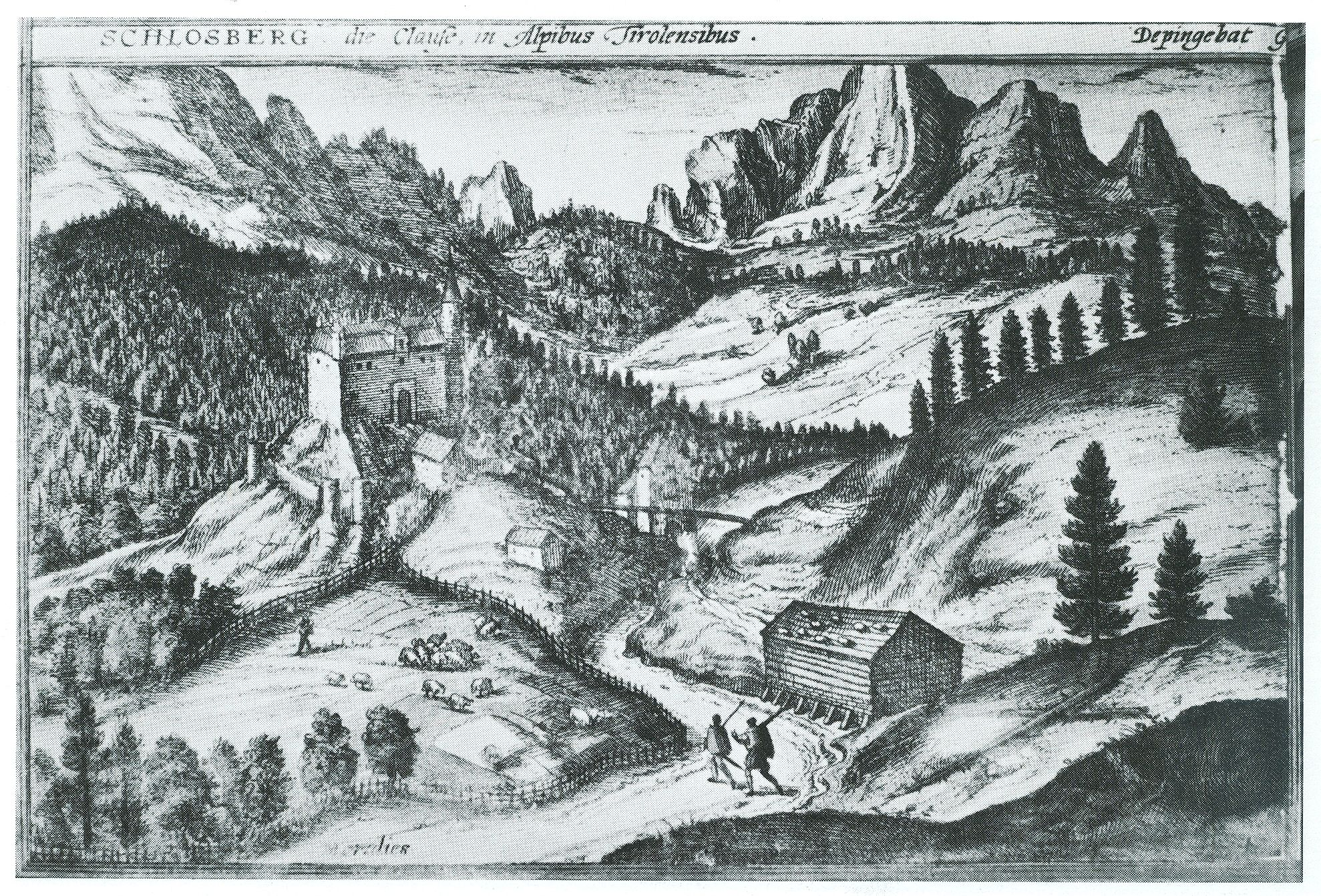
Schlossberg Castle and hermitage from 1590

== 21st century ==
The old castle is on a round hill north of Seefeld above the Dahnbach stream and at the foot of the Hochegg (47.343411°N 11.202374°E). The road through the Scharenz runs past the castle site; a route that for centuries has linked Mittenwald and the Inn valley. In the area to the north of the Schlossberg hill, the gradient of this road was reduced in 1974 and the small hill completely dug up. During an emergency excavation carried out at the time the size of the inner ward from the 13th century was confirmed as 19.3 by 21.6 metres (63 by 71 ft) and the outer walls were 1.25 metres (4.1 ft) thick. It was partitioned by two dividing walls into three longitudinal areas. In the centre of the site was a small courtyard, 7 by 5 metres (23 by 16 ft). The entranceway lay on the southern side and was protected by a moat, over which the Schloßpruggen drove in 1549. At its corners there were pentagonal oriels for defensive fire. The main building was surrounded by a medieval Zwinger with walls 1.2 to 3.6 metres (3.9 to 11.8 ft) thick, the southwest corner of which was fortified with a roundel (Rondell). A wall or letzi blocking access along the gorge (Klausenmauer, Wegsperre) ran from the east side of the castle to the street below and from there up the opposite hillside where it ended at the rocks.

== Literature ==
- Oswald Trapp; et al. (1982), Tiroler Burgenbuch. Vol. VI – Mittleres Inntal (in German), Bozen: Verlagsanstalt Athesia, ISBN 88-7014-275-2
