= Letzi =

Type of defensive barrier

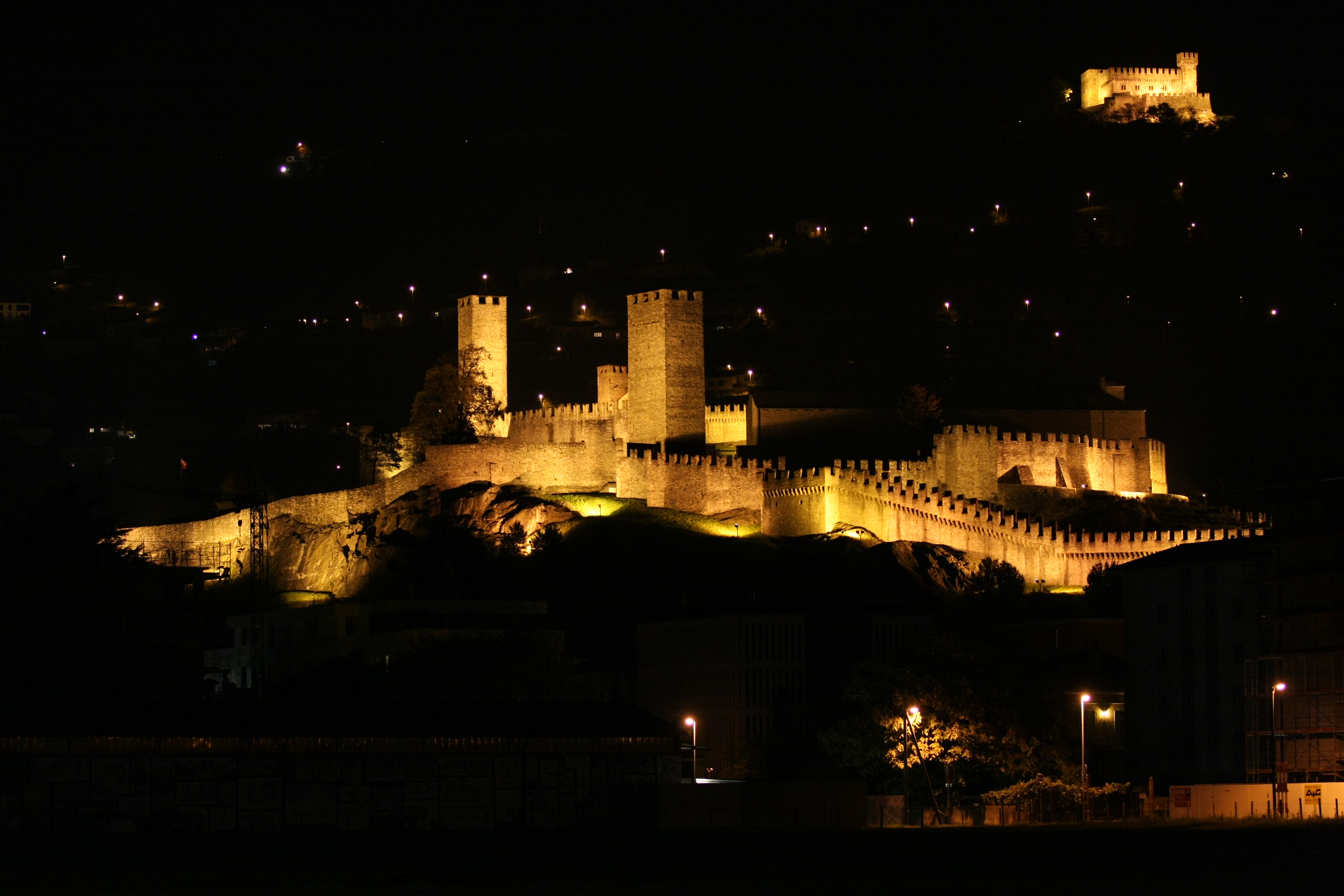
The castles and defensive barriers of Bellinzona

A Letzi (plural: Letzinen, also known in German as a Talsperre in the sense of a fortification, not a dam) or Letzimauer refers to defensive barriers whose purpose is to protect the entrance into a valley. The term is Swiss, and such stone barriers were particularly common in medieval Switzerland but were also built in Austria and Germany.

== Location ==
Letzis usually consisted of:

- hill castles on the valley sides or on heights either side of the valley
- defensive walls, often in combination with other bastions, running transversely across the valley in order to seal it completely. Because these parts of the position were typically unable to use the advantage of height, they had some of the character of lowland castles.

Because they had a combination of elements of hill and lowland castles, letzis did not fall neatly into either category.

The walls were often several kilometres long, for example in Rothenthurm SZ, and were often combined with ditches.

Such defensive valley barriers were still being built in the 19th century, for example the Forte della Chiusa and Buco di Vela.

== Purpose ==
Researchers have not been united in all respects about whether these fortifications actually served as protective lines of defence or whether, in most cases, they were just intended as border marcations and defence against cattle thieves.

What is certain is the Letzis were used to force merchants to adhere to specified routes (Straßenzwang) and thus to enable the collection of customs duties (Wegzoll) and money to pay for the maintenance of the roads.

== Examples with hill castles ==
- Castles of Bellinzona, Ticino
- Castelmur Castle, Grisons
- Ehrenberg Castle, Tyrol
- Fernstein Castle, Tyrol
- Fracstein Castle, Grisons
- Klamm Castle (Lower Austria) above Schottwien
- Mauterndorf Castle, Salzburg
- Schlossberg Castle (Seefeld in Tirol)
- Castle ruins in the Mühlbacher Klause, South Tyrol
- Hohenwerfen Fortress, Salzburg
- Fortini della Fame, Ticino
- Karlsfried, Saxony
- La Serra, Zernez, Grisons
- Letzi and ruins of Mülenen Castle, Berne
- Serravalle, Ticino
- Schloß-Nauses Castle, Hesse
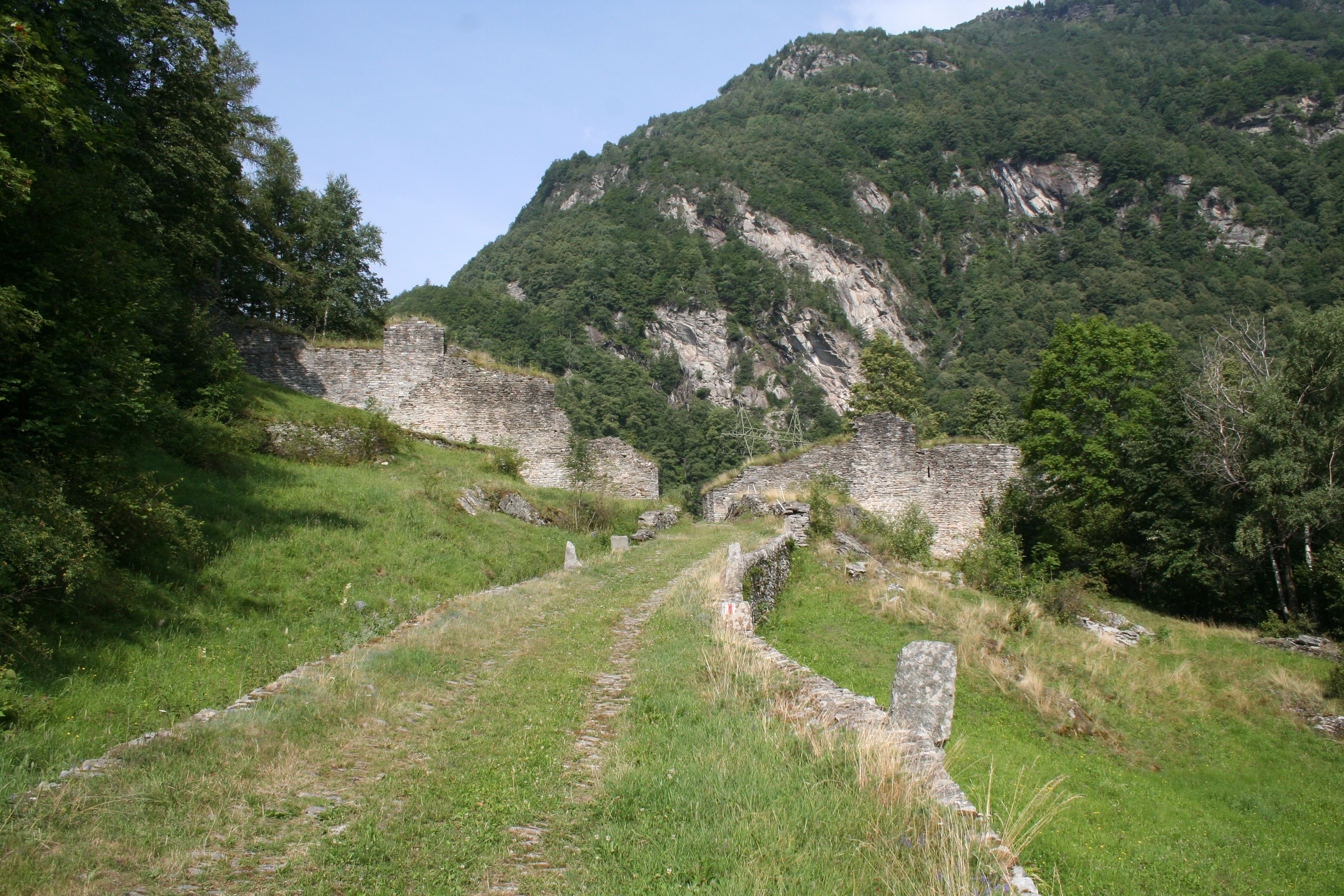
Castle and letzi of Castelmur

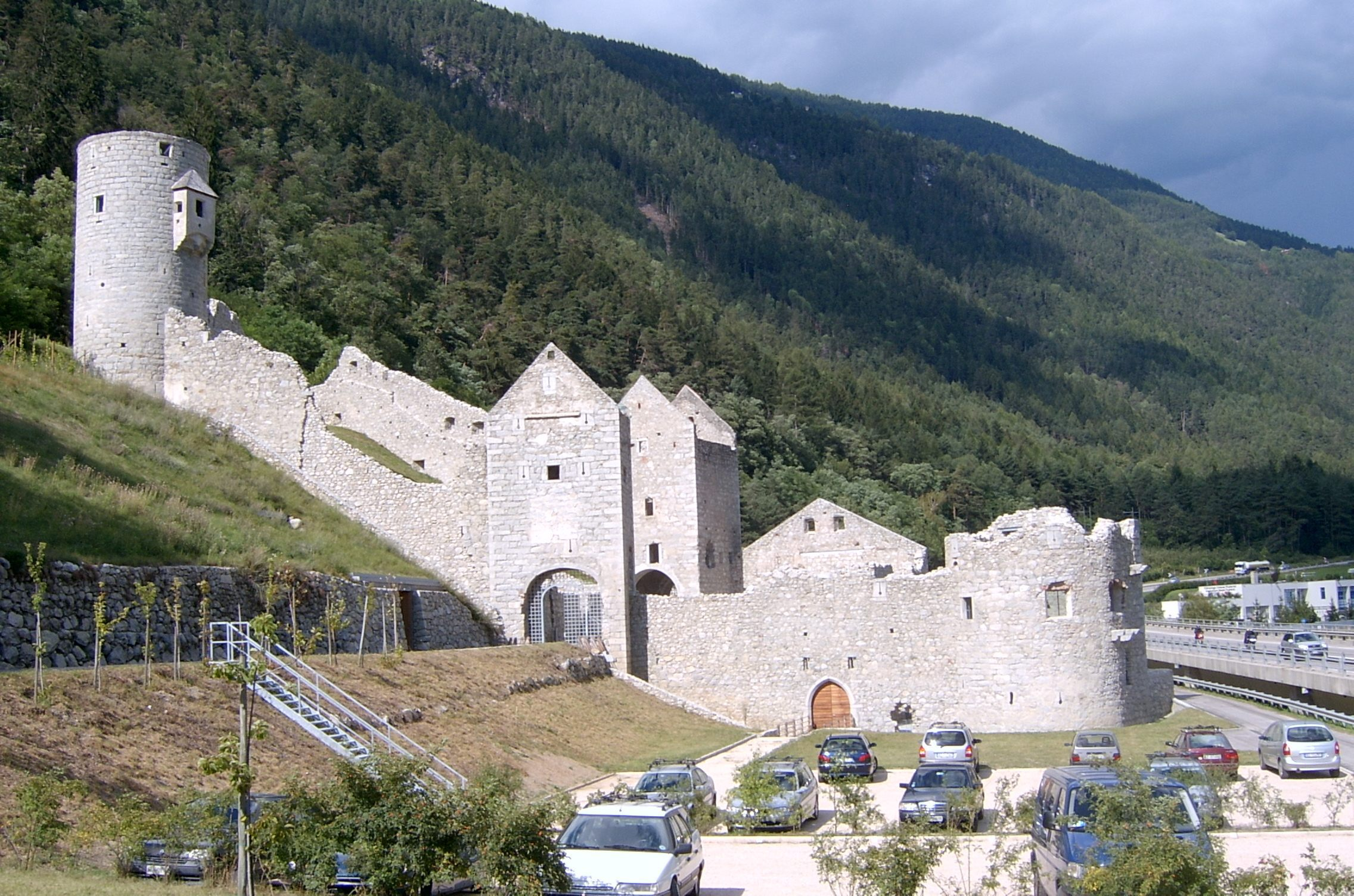
The castle ruins in the Mühlbacher Klause, which guards the western Pustertal

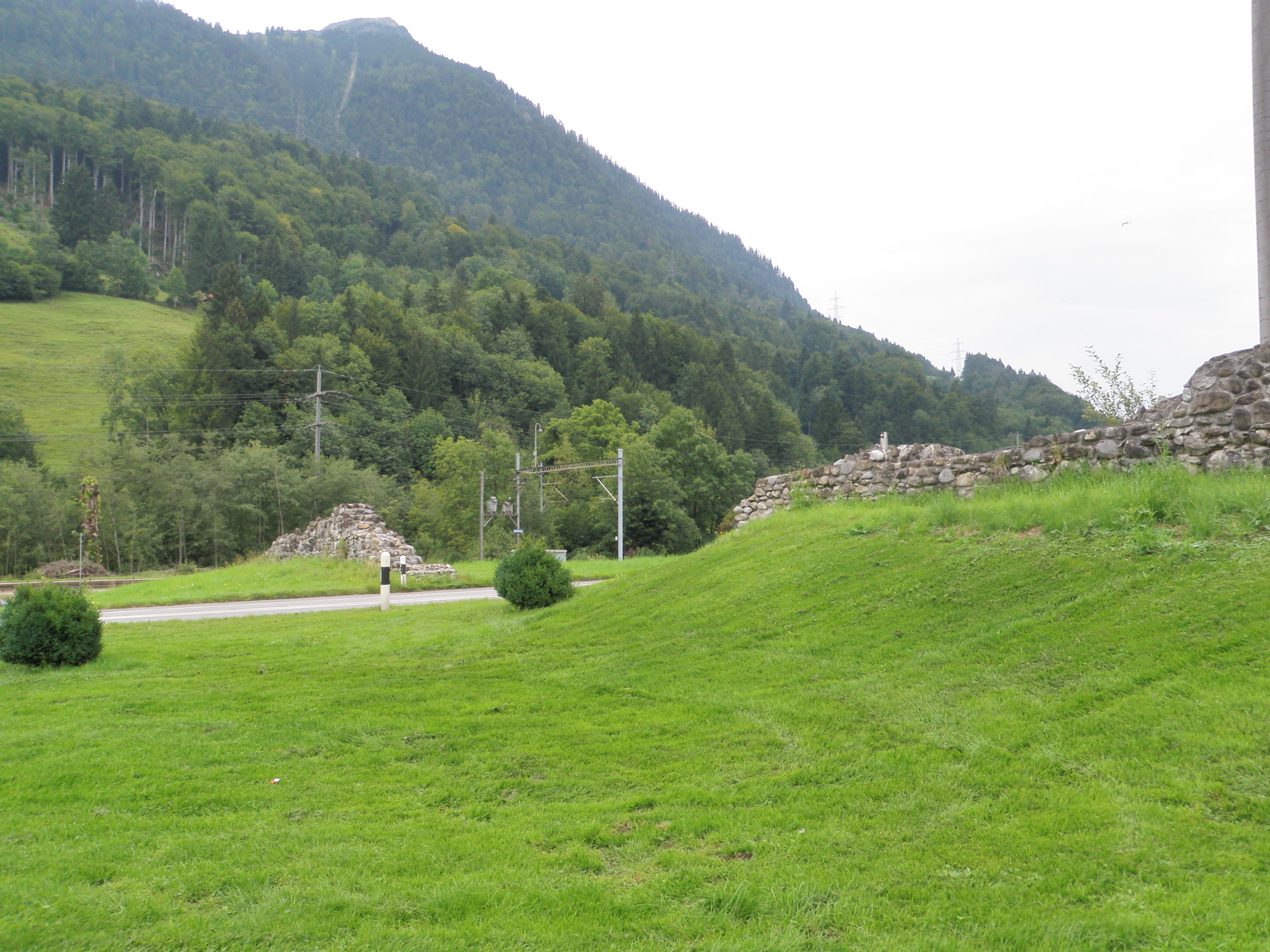
Letzi of Mülenen Castle

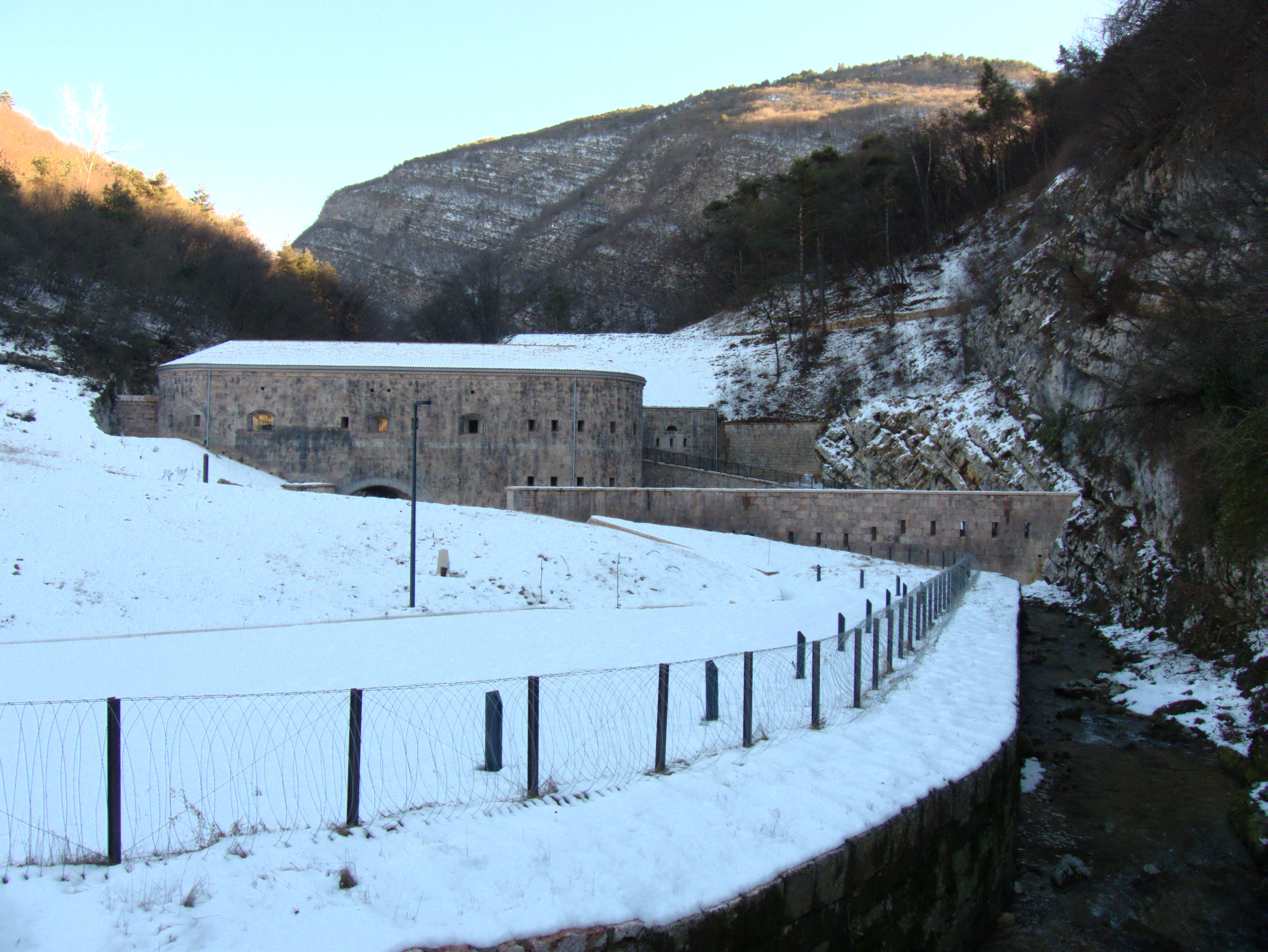
Buco di Vela

== Free-standing examples ==
- Hadnmauer (a letzi near Rattendorf in the Gailtal valley, which presumably guarded Gurina)
- Landmauer Gamsen, Wallis
- Letzis of Arth and Oberarth, Schwyz
- Letzimauer in Näfels, Glarus
- Letzimauer in Rothenthurm, Schwyz
- Letzi Tower, Basel
- Letzi Tower in Morgarten, Schwyz
- Porta Claudia, Tyrol
- Türkenschanze, Carinthia
- Hardturm, Zürich
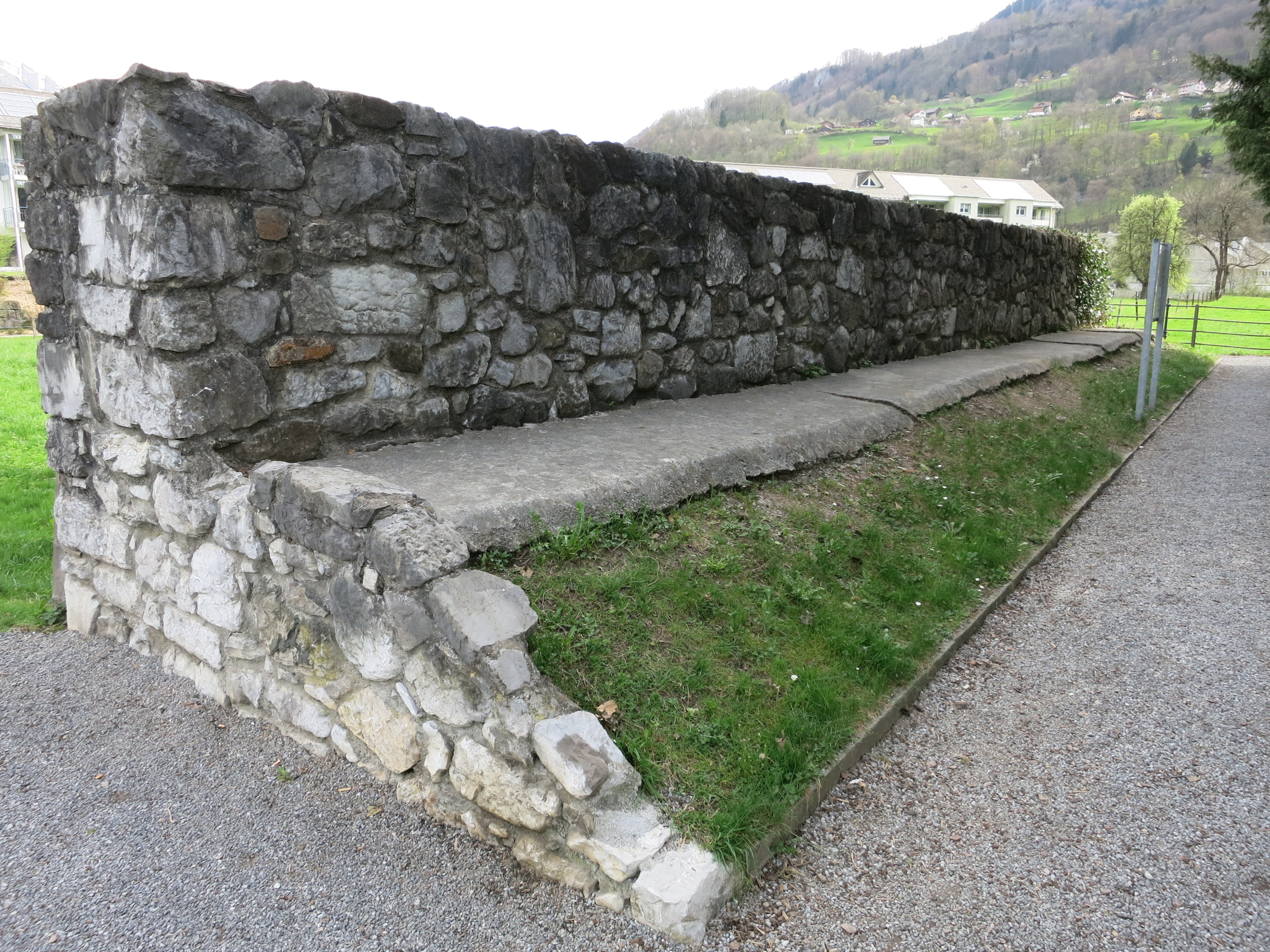
Letzimauer at Näfels

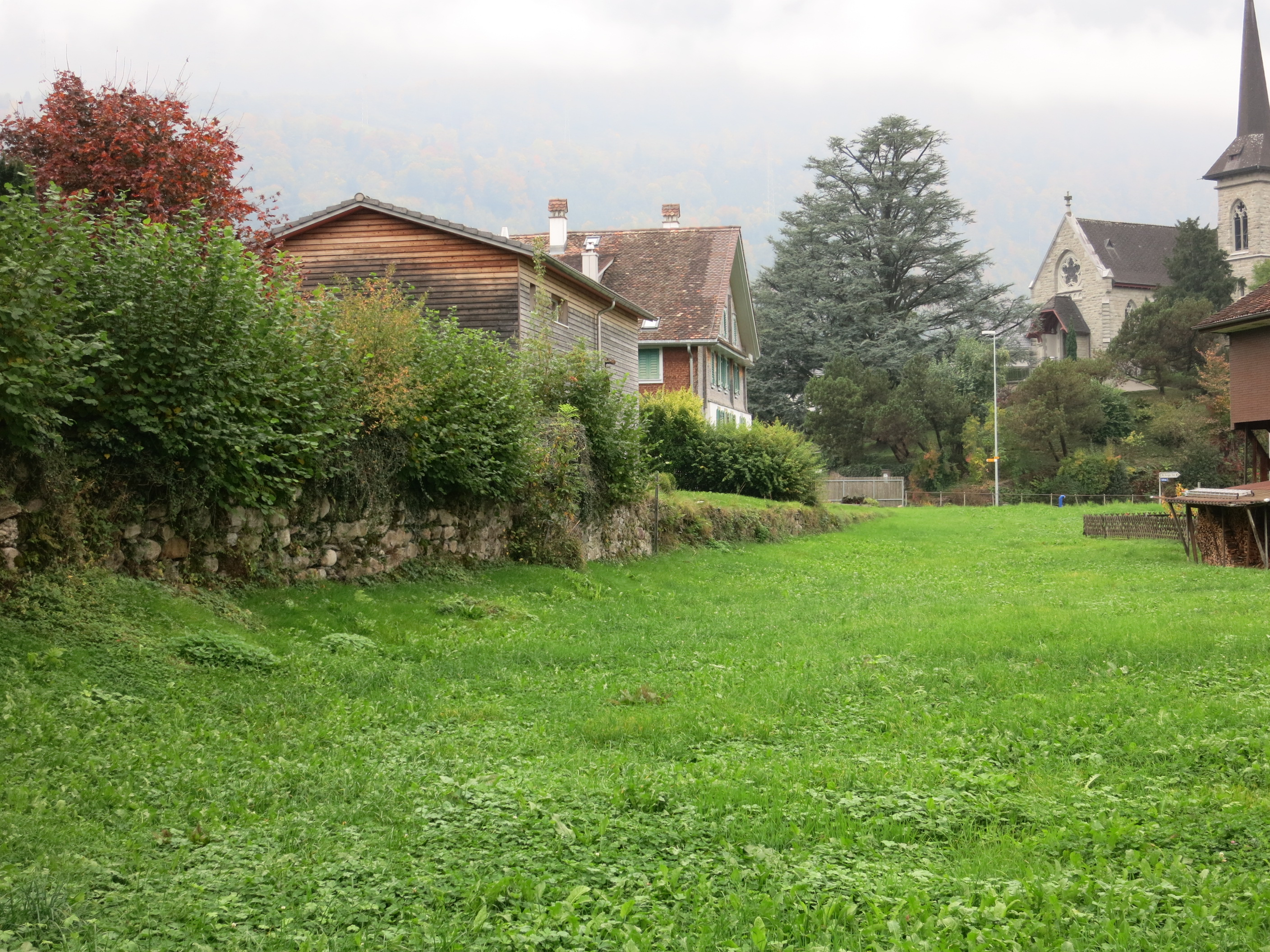
Letzimauer at Oberarth

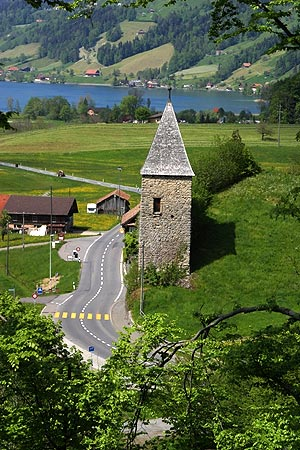
Letzi Tower in Morgarten

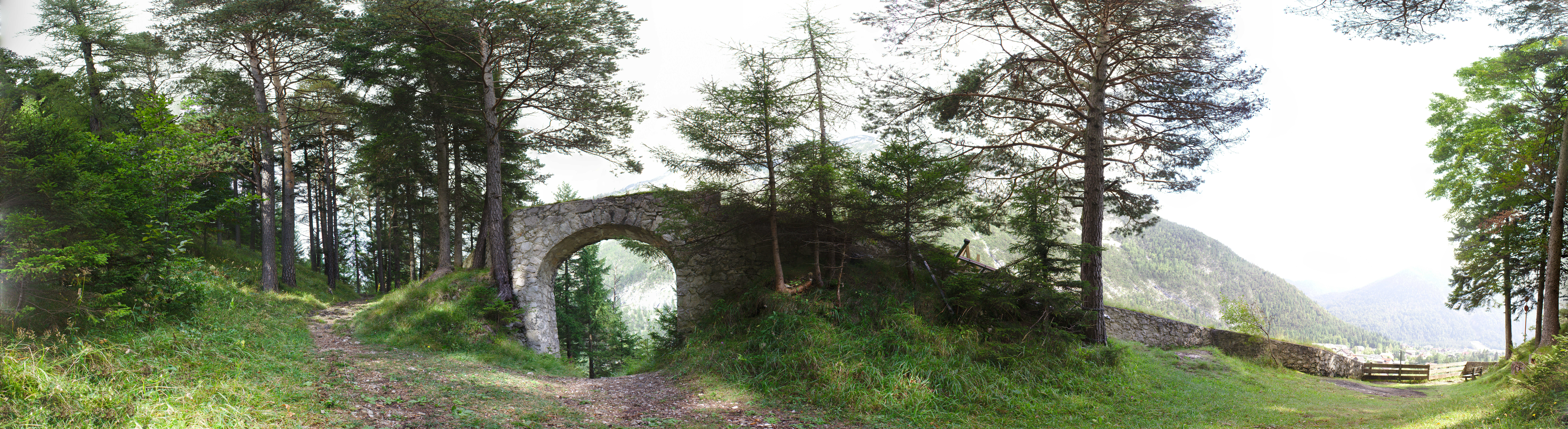
Porta Claudia

== Name ==
The Swiss German word, Letzi, comes from the Middle High German "letze", i. e. a barrier, obstacle, defensive wall or border fortification. Even today many toponyms include the words Letzinen, Letzimauern or Letzitürme. Remains of such defensive fortifications may still be seen in many places today.

Examples of Letzi in place names:

- Letzigasse in Zofingen
- Letzigraben and Letzistrasse in Zürich
- Letzigrund Stadium in Zürich
