= Arnspitze Group =

Austrian-German mountain chain

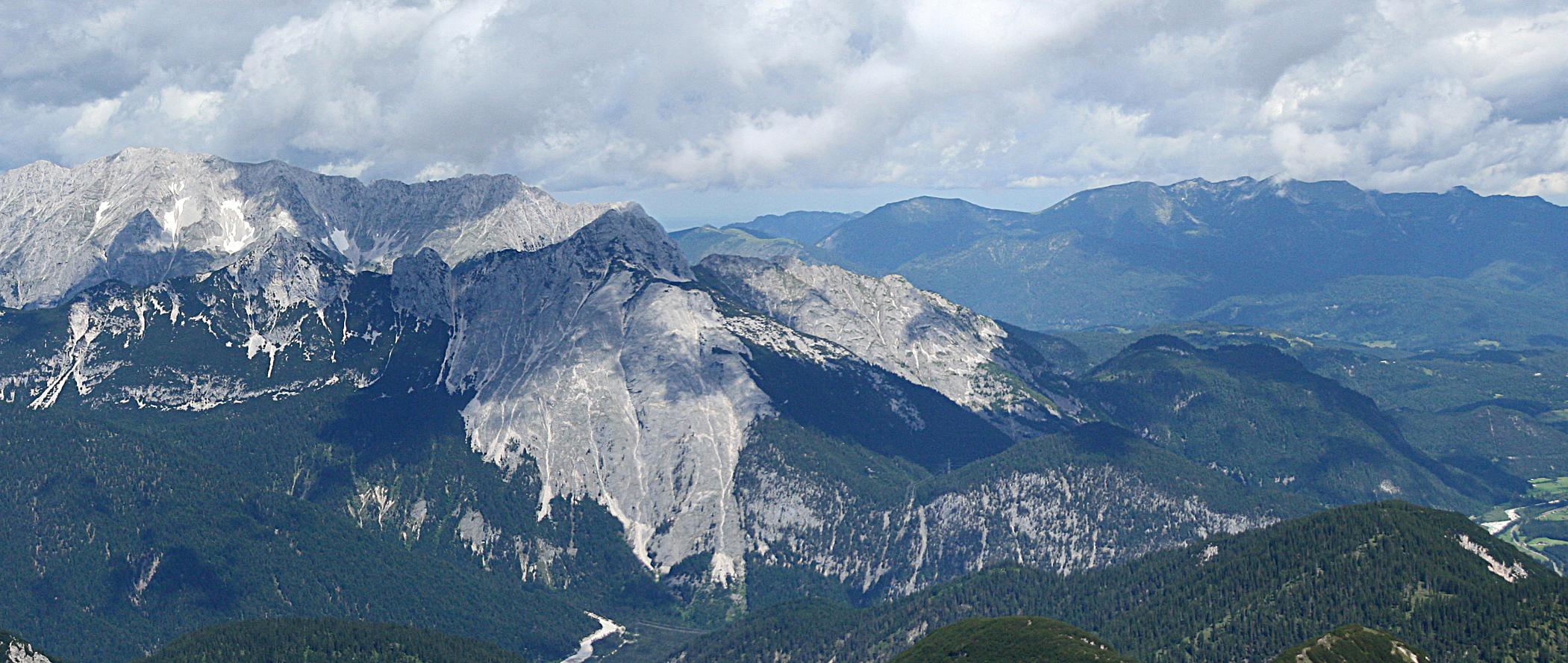
- Summits of the Arnspitze Group from the south

Highest point
- Peak: Große Arnspitze
- Elevation: 2,196 m (7,205 ft)
- Listing: Nature reserve
- Coordinates: 47°23′49.67″N 11°13′21.15″E

Dimensions
- Length: 10 km (6.2 mi)

Geography
- Location within Tyrol, Austria
- Countries: Germany and Austria
- States: Bavaria and Tyrol (Innsbruck Land district)
- Parent range: Wetterstein Mountains; North Tyrol Limestone Alps

The Arnspitze Group (German: Arnspitzgruppe) is a free-standing mountain chain in Austrian and Germany, in the states of Tyrol and Bavaria, between Seefeld in Tirol and Mittenwald, and between the Leutasch valley in the west and the Isar valley near Scharnitz in the east. In the literature, the Arnspitze Group is classed as part of the Wettersteingebirge. The majority of the group belongs to Tyrol, a northeastern part of the chain lies in Bavaria. The border between Bavaria and Tyrol runs over the summit of the Große Arnspitze.

== Peaks ==
- Große Arnspitze (2196 m AMSL)
- Middle Arnspitze (Mittlere Arnspitze) (2091 m AMSL)
- Arnplattenspitze (Hintere Arnspitze) (2171 m AMSL)
- Weißlehnkopf (2002 m AMSL)
- Arnkopf (1934 m AMSL)
- Zwirchkopf (1773 m AMSL)

(along the main chain from the northwest)

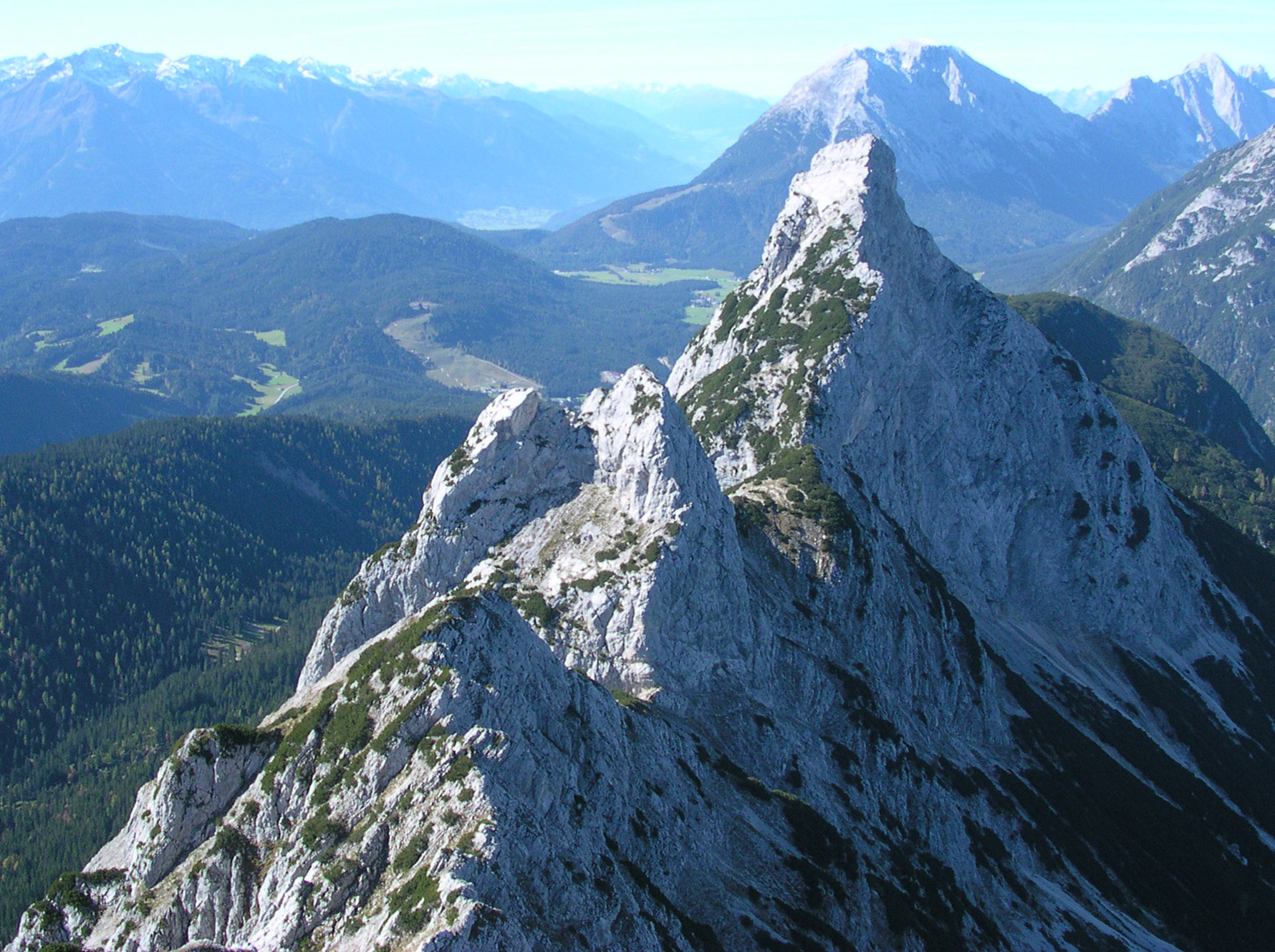
View from the Große Arnspitze over the twin peaks of the Middle Arnspitze to the Arnplattenspitze

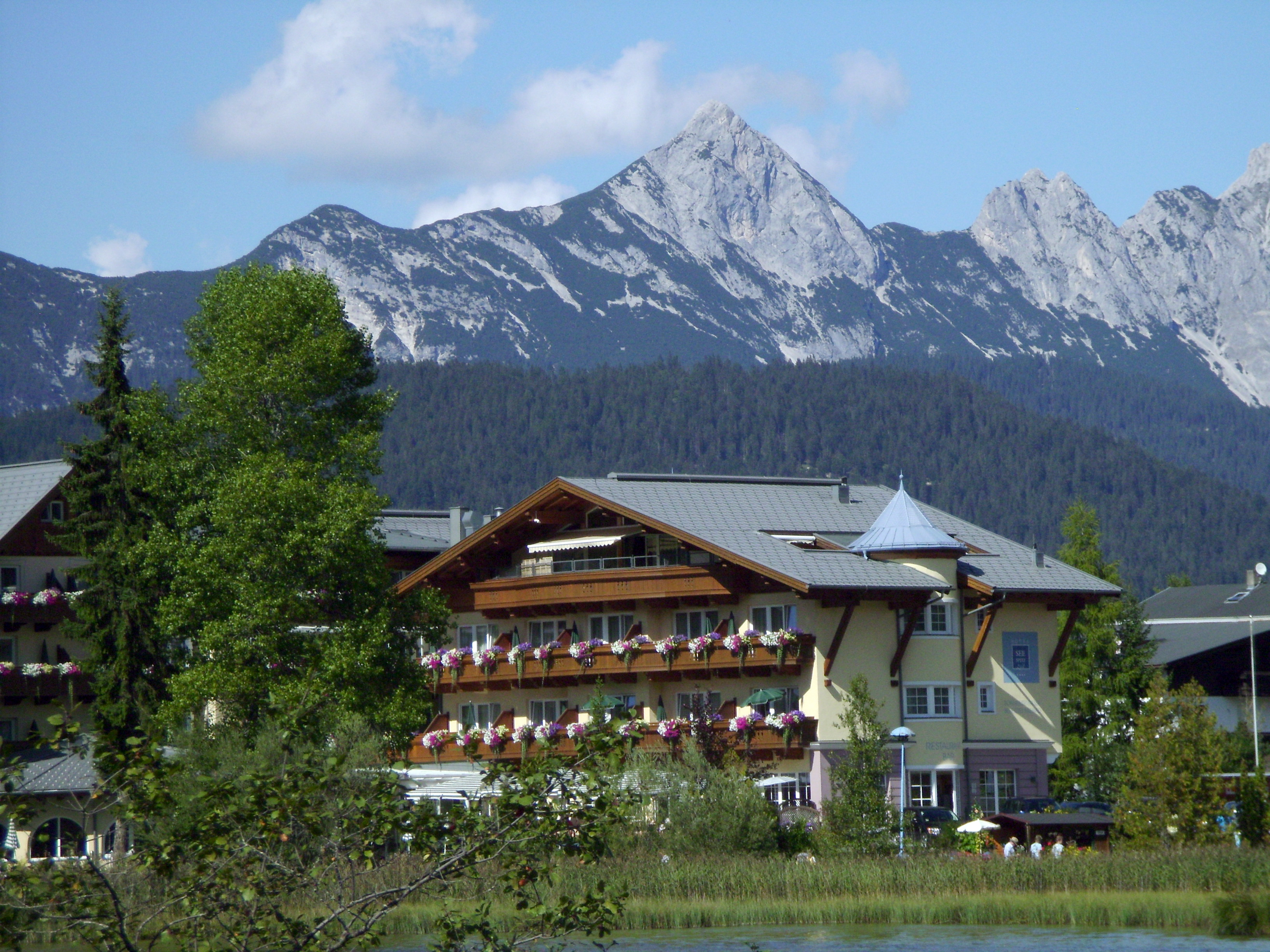
The Arnplattenspitze (left) and Middle Arnspitze (right) from Wildsee

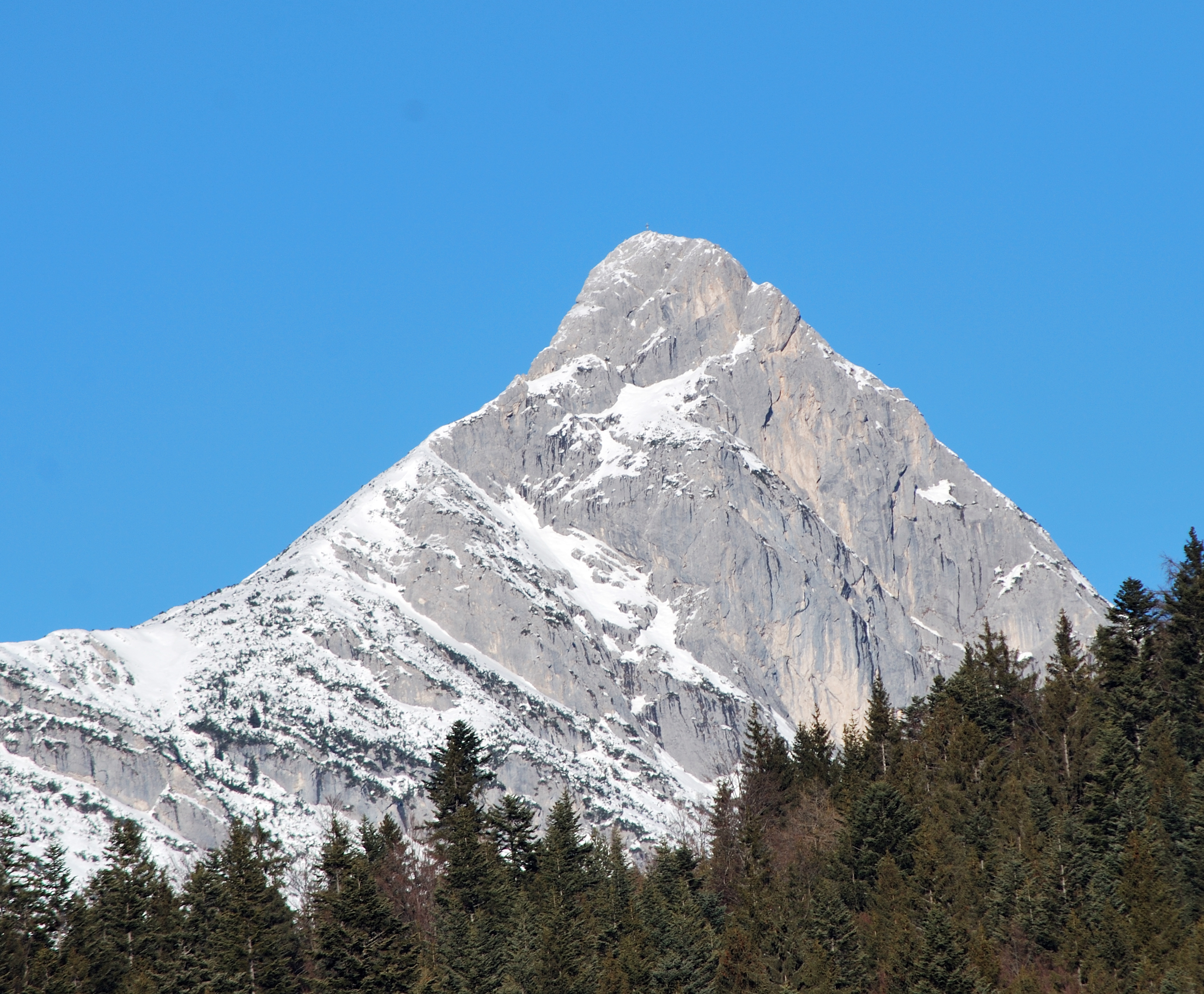
The Arnplattenspitze from the south

== Roads and paths ==
There are no public roads in the region; only a very steep forest road from Ahrn in the municipality of Leutasch to the Hoher Sattel. From the hamlet of Ahrn and from the hunting lodge on the Hoher Sattel there are 5 paths to the individual summits. Whilst the Große Arnspitze and the Arnplattenspitze may be reached either from Mittenwald via the Riedberg or from Scharnitz on a partially exposed climbing route, the ridge path of the three peaks, including the Mittlere Arnspitze requires climbing expertise of grade II standard. The most scenic route to the Große Arnspitze runs from the Leutasch over the Riedbergscharte and the Achterköpfe. Below the summit at a height of 1,930 m is the unmanned hut of Arnspitzhütte.

== Geology ==
The Arnspitze Group is part of the Northern Limestone Alps and belongs tectonically to the Inn Valley range (Inntaldecke), only the northernmost part from the Riedberg ridge (Riedbergscharte) is part of the Lech Valley range (Lechtaldecke). The Arnspitze Group is, for the most part, made up of rocks of Wetterstein limestone, which dip towards the southeast. In the area of the Hoher Sattel, a band of Raibler strata runs from west to east, while the Zunteregg, which is 1682 m above sea level and lies south of the Arnspitze, is made of main dolomite (Hauptdolomit) rock. Lead used to be mined at the foot of the Große Arnspitze. The mine lay on Bavarian territory just north of the Austrian border in the Isar valley, at the southwestern end of the Riedboden.

== Arnspitze Nature Reserve ==
The Arnspitze Group is a nature reserve. The Arnspitze Nature Reserve was established on 19 November 1942. That part which is nowadays in Austria, on the territory of the municipalities of Leutasch and Scharnitz in the district of Innsbruck Land, is designated a nature reserve by the Tyrolean nature conservation law, and has an area of 10.8 km², and is the oldest nature reserve in the Tyrol. The Bavarian part has an area of 1.7 km².

== Fire disaster ==
At the end of August 1947 a devastating fire broke out on the southeastern slopes of the Arnspitze as a result of extreme drought. The fire was fought for weeks by thousands of firemen from Upper Bavaria and Tyrol. This side of the mountain has remained bare ever since.

== Sources ==
- Oberhuber, W. (1995). Naturschutzgebiet Arnspitze Naturinventar. Im Auftrag der Abteilung Umweltschutz, Amt der Tiroler Landesregierung.
