= Porta Claudia =

Coordinates: 47°23′46″N 11°15′54″E

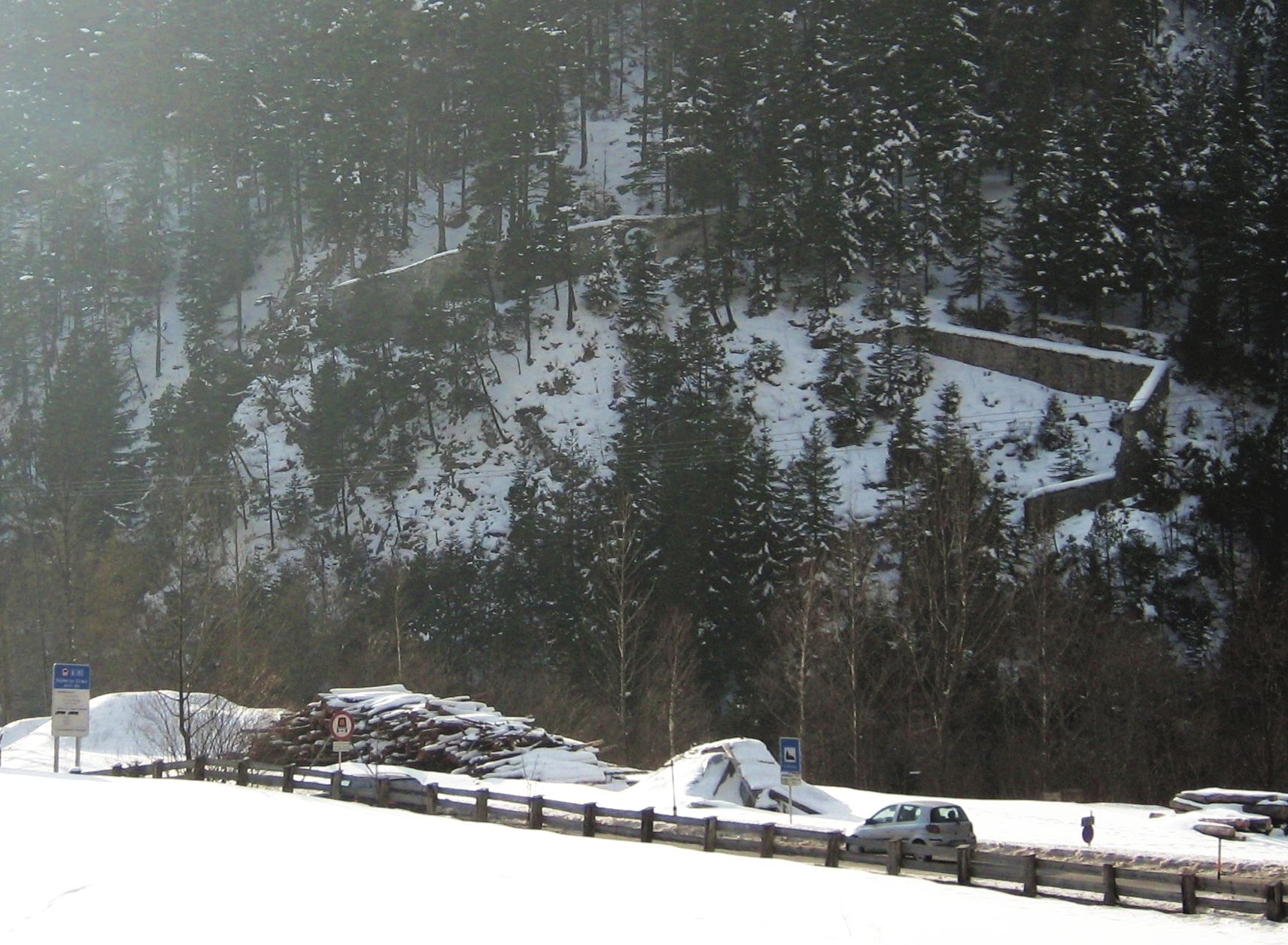
Remains of Porta Claudia on the western hillside

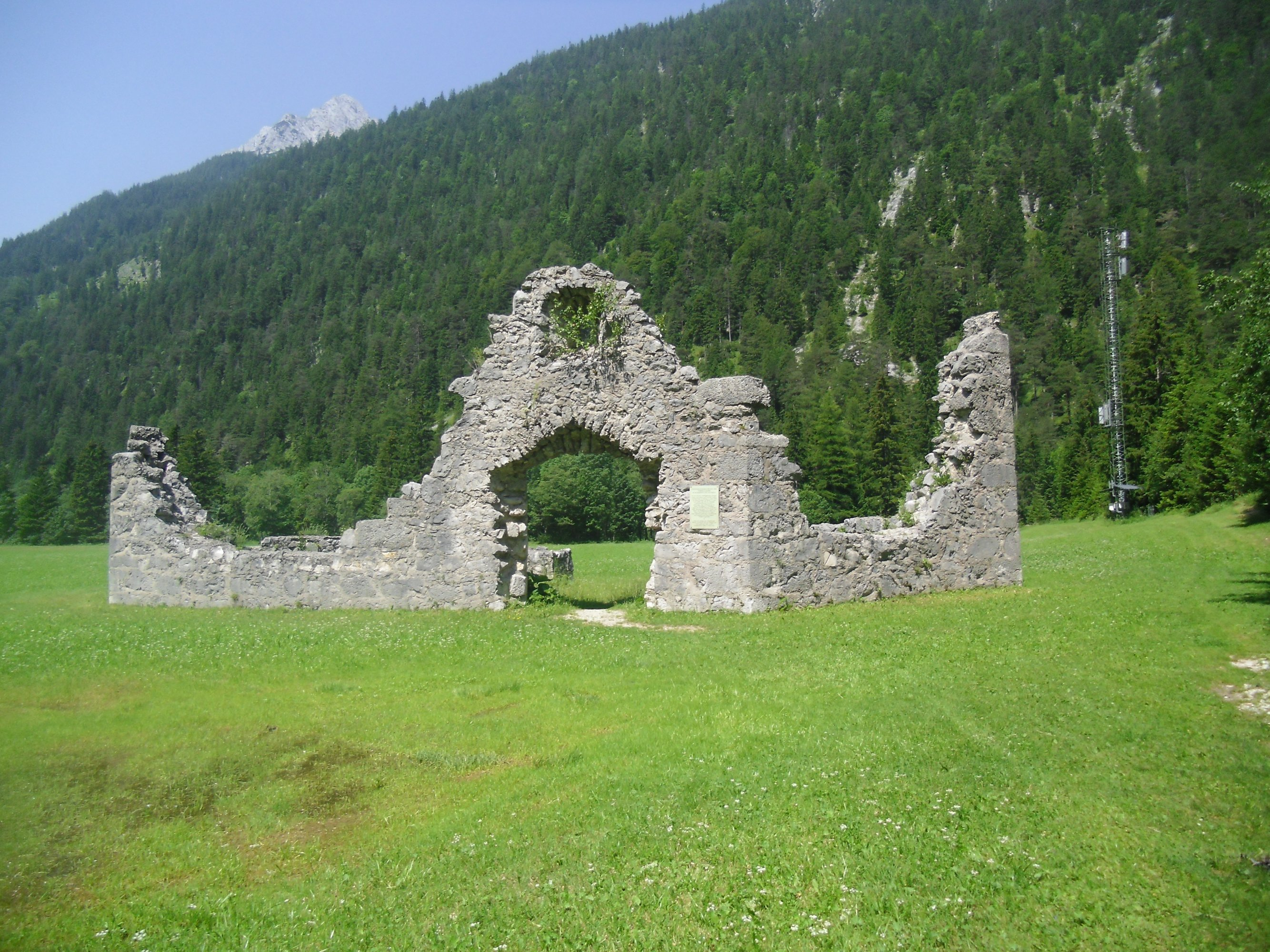
Leutascher Schanz

The Porta Claudia is a former fortification at the Scharnitz Pass, where the valley of the River Isar narrows near the village of Scharnitz (Tyrol, Austria), on the Bavarian border near Mittenwald. The Porta Claudia – or more precisely the Scharnitz Pass – is the start of the present federal highways, the B 2 (Germany) and the B 177 (Austria).

== History ==
In the Middle Ages the Scharnitz Pass belonged to the County of Werdenfels, the border between the County of Tyrol then being located at Schlossberg Castle north of Seefeld. The long-term aim of Tyrol was to push the state border north to the strategically important Scharnitz Pass. The Tyrolese achieved a partial success when, on 20 October 1500, Emperor Maximilian I and Prince-Bishop Philip of Freising ratified a treaty agreed the year before that moved the border of Tyrol to within a kilometre south of Scharnitz.

In 1633, Tyrol was granted the right to build border fortification of Porta Claudia at the Scharnitz Pass on Werdenfels territory in order to protect themselves from the advancing Swedish Army in the Thirty Years' War. The construction of the castle guarding the valley was ordered by Claudia de' Medici, Archduchess of Austria and Princess of Tyrol, to fortify the important crossing from Bavaria to Tyrol. The castle was named after the princess. In a treaty made on 29 October 1656, Scharnitz and the region around the Porta Claudia were swapped for a strip of land around the Kienleitenkopf including the Karolingerhof and rights of way into the Hinterautal valley. In 1670, the fortress was expanded and, in 1703, during the Bavarian Rummel occupied in a raid. The destruction that the blowing up of the powder magazine by the Bavarian garrison had ordered, were soon repaired. In another treaty on 28 May 1766, Tyrol's possession of Scharnitz and the Porta Claudia was confirmed as was a strip of territory "at a musket shot's distance at all existing fortification works in the direction of Mittenwald".

Goethe described the border in 1786 in his report on his trip to Italy as "enclosed by a rampart that sealed the valley and was joined to the mountains."

=== 1805 siege ===
During Napoleon's campaign against Austria in 1805, the War of the Third Coalition, French troops under Marshal Ney besieged the passes of Scharnitz and Leutasch on their northern, Bavarian side. At that time the Porta Claudia did not just include the fortifications near Scharnitz, but similar defences a few kilometres west at the entrance to the Leutasch valley, known as the Leutascher Schanz. The ruins of the latter may still be seen. The VI French Army Corps, with 8,000 to 9,000 men, faced 2,200 Tyrolese. Led by local guides from Mittenwald (Bavaria was on the side of Napoléon Bonaparte), the French were able to deploy to a flank along a mountain track that ran from the Lautersee and Ferchensee past the Grünkopf (1,587 m) and attack the Austrians stationed at the Leutascher Schanz fortifications unexpectedly from the rear on 4 November 1805. They were thus able to conquer the Leutascher Schanz and then move via Seefeld to seize the Scharnitz Pass as well and so invade the Inn valley and threaten Innsbruck. The track running past the Grünkopf was named Franzosensteig ("French Path") as a result and is still shown as such in modern hiking maps. Allegedly in the ambush on Leutasch only one shell was fired from the cannons. The shell hit the inn, Gasthaus zur Mühle, where it is still in the possession of the innkeeper today. Following her defeat in the Austerlitz, in the Peace of Pressburg on 26 December 1805 between Austria and France, Austria had to cede the County of Tyrol and Vorarlberg to Bavaria and Emperor Francis II had to recognise Napoleon as Emperor.

== Present condition ==
Today only a wall, up to 6 metres (20 ft) high, remains of the Porta Claudia. The remains of the little sconce in the Leutasch may be seen at the old customs post in Unterleutasch-Schanz.

== Literature ==
- Hans v. Zwiedineck-Südenhorst: Die Ostalpen in den Franzosenkriegen, II. Theil. Der Feldzug von 1805, pp. 110 f., Zeitschrift des Deutschen und Österreichischen Alpenvereins, Jahrgang 1898, Vol. XXIX
- Carl Baur: Der Krieg in Tirol während des Feldzugs von 1809, mit besonderer Hinsicht auf das Corps des Obersten Grafen von Arco. Mit Anmerkungen über die Natur des Krieges in diesem Gebirgslande nebst einer Charte des Kriegsschauplatzes. Munich, 1812 at Google Books.
