= Hadnmauer =

Protected ruin in Austria

Coordinates: 46.6165°N 13.2457°E

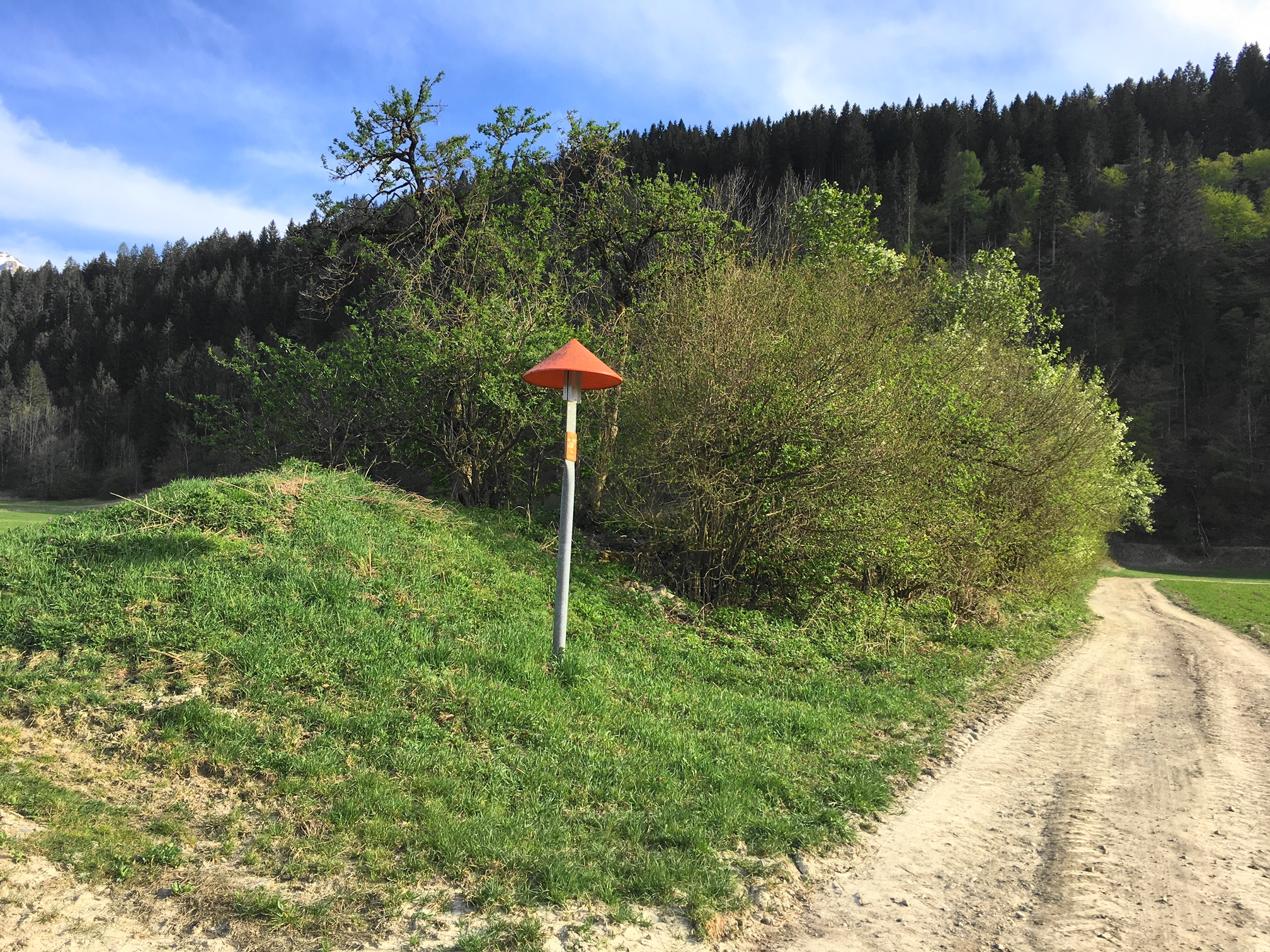
Römische Talsperre Hadnmauer

The Hadnmauer is the protected ruin of a letzi (defensive barrier across a valley) in the Gailtal valley in Austria, dating to the Late Antiquity. It runs from Rattendorf to Jenig (both in the municipality of Hermagor). Its function was probably the security of Gurina and the area to the east of it. Originally 1.6 kilometres (0.99 mi) long, only 336 metres (1,102 ft) survive. On its western side, rooms for the defending personnel are discernible.
