= Rotwandlspitze =

Mountain of Bavaria, Germany

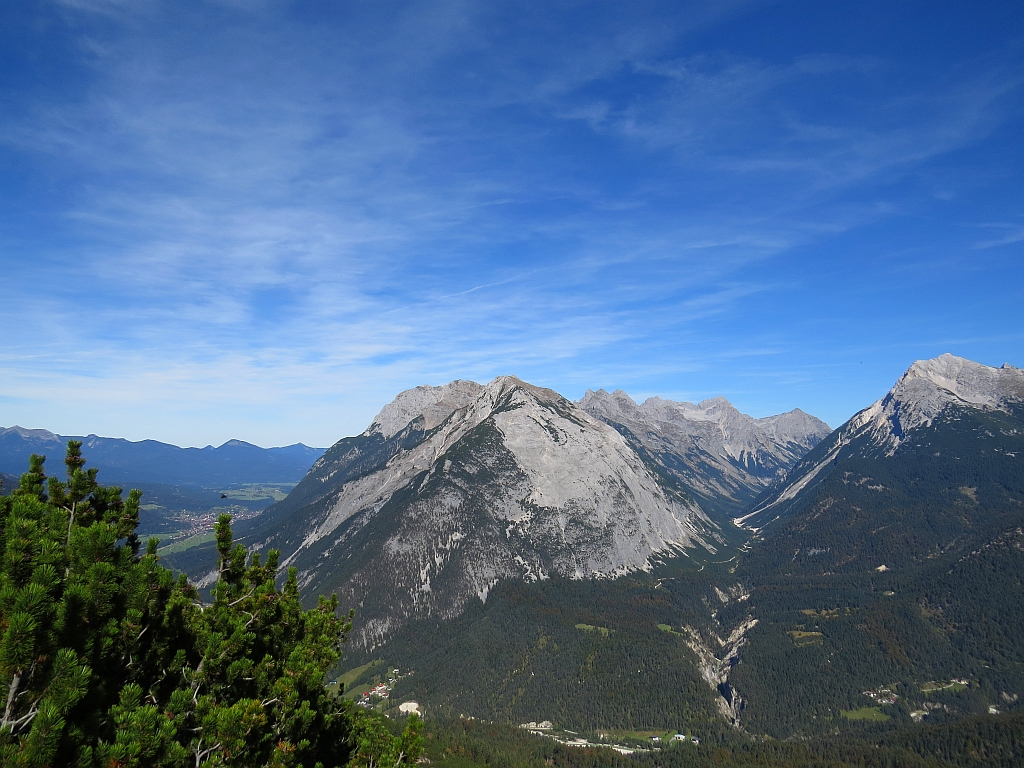

Highest point
- Elevation: 2,191 m (7,188 ft)
- Coordinates: 47°24′25″N 11°17′18″E

Geography
- Location within Bavaria
- Location: Bavaria, Germany

Rotwandlspitze is a mountain of Bavaria, Germany. It forms a double peak with Brunnensteinspitze.
