= Scharnitz =

- Municipality
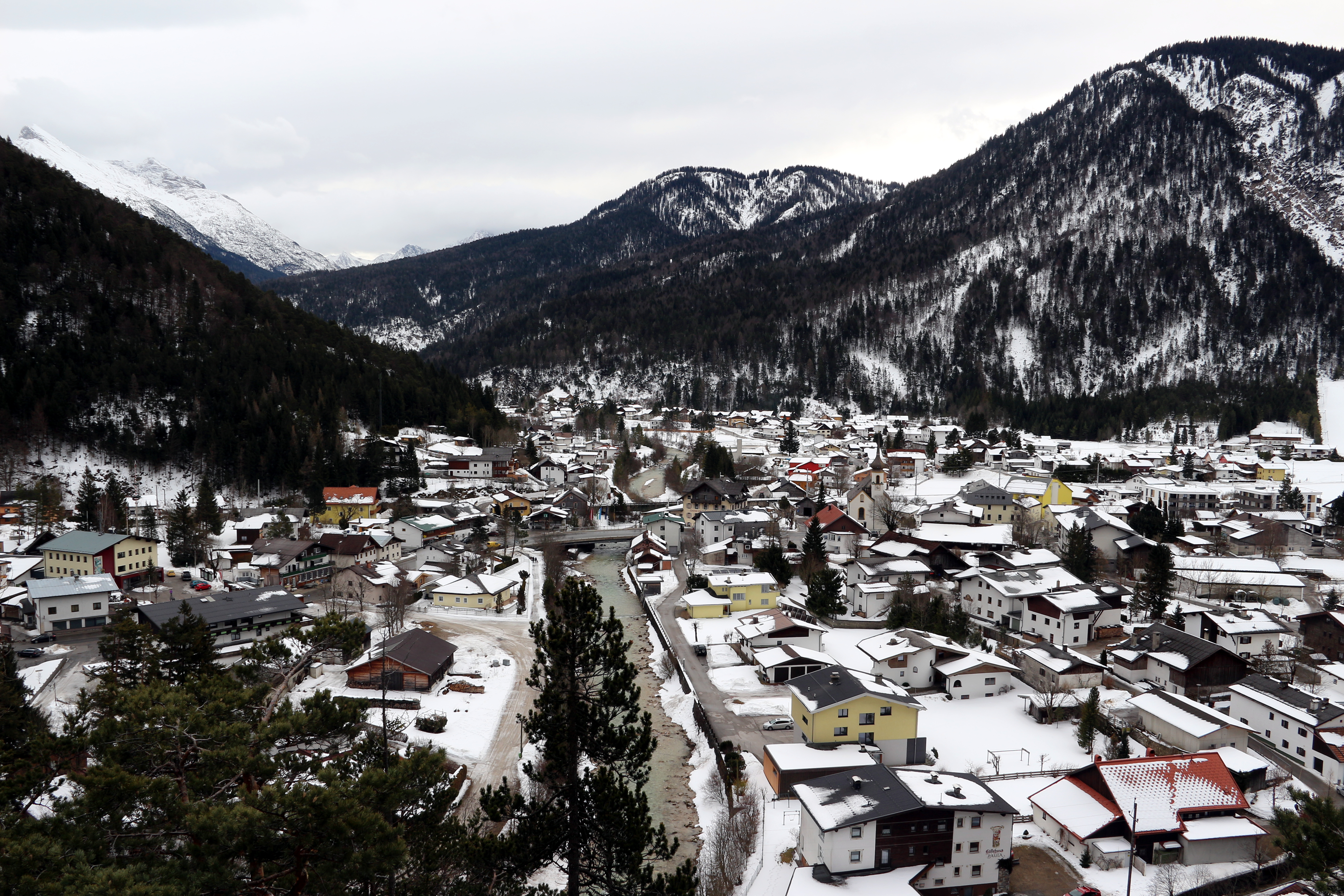

- Coat of arms
- Interactive map of Scharnitz
- Location within Austria
- Coordinates: 47°23′18″N 11°15′54″E
- Country: Austria
- State: Tyrol
- District: Innsbruck Land

Government
  - Mayor: Isabella Blaha (Bürger für Scharnitz)

Area
  - Total: 158.77 km^{2} (61.30 sq mi)
- Elevation: 964 m (3,163 ft)

Population (2020)
  - Total: 1,361
  - Density: 8.572/km^{2} (22.20/sq mi)
- Time zone: UTC+1 (CET)
  - Summer (DST): UTC+2 (CEST)
- Postal code: 6108
- Area code: 05213
- Vehicle registration: IL
- Website: www.scharnitz.tirol.gv.at

Scharnitz is a municipality in the district of Innsbruck-Land in the Austrian state of Tyrol located 16.4 kilometres (10.2 mi) north of Innsbruck and 9 kilometres (5.6 mi) from Seefeld in Tirol on the German border. It is one of the largest municipalities and has 10 parts: Au, Eisack, Gießenbach, Inrain, Jägerviertel, Oberdorf, Schanz, Schießstand, Siedlung, Unterdorf. The village was founded in the early Middle Ages and was once an important commercial route between Germany and Italy. The main source of income is tourism, both in summer and winter. Scharnitz is the western entry point to the Hinterau valley, where the source of river Isar is located.

== Population ==
Historical population
Year	Pop.	±%
1869	539	—
1880	515	−4.5%
1890	524	+1.7%
1900	560	+6.9%
1910	587	+4.8%
1923	712	+21.3%
1934	818	+14.9%
1939	841	+2.8%
1951	1,069	+27.1%
1961	1,014	−5.1%
1971	1,205	+18.8%
1981	1,045	−13.3%
1991	1,100	+5.3%
2001	1,291	+17.4%
2011	1,291	+0.0%
