= Patricia Karg =

Patricia Karg (born December 7, 1961) is an Austrian sculptor and painter.

== Life ==
Patricia Karg is the daughter of master builder Ludwig Karg, from whom she learned a connection to craftsmanship, and his wife Gertraud. Patricia learned to sew from her grandmother, a needlework teacher who awakened her creativity.

After compulsory school, Karg attended the technical school for wood and stone sculpture at the HTL Bau und Kunst Innsbruck from 1976 to 1980 and graduated in 1981 with the journeyman's examination. From 1980 to 1987 she studied sculpture at the Academy of Fine Arts and was a master student of Hans Ladner. She completed her studies with a diploma. She has been working as a freelance artist since 1987.

Karg works with wood, stone, cast stone, cast bronze, iron and glass. She paints with acrylic, oil, watercolor and does graphic art. Her artistic motto is: "Through my work I want to edify and broaden people's minds. My works should be food for the soul."

Patricia Karg lives with her daughters in Thaur in Tyrol. She designed her studio house, which she moved into in 1995, herself and had it realized by Innsbruck architect Wolfgang Martin Miess.

== Awards ==
- 1981: Prize of the City of Innsbruck
- 1981 and 1983: Prize of the art didacta innsbruck - International Summer Academy for Fine Arts
- 1983: Prize of the International Summer Academy, Innsbruck
- 1984: Prize of the 88th Katholikentag, Munich
- 1985: 1st prize for the redesign of the church St. Philipp Neri in Munich
- 1987: 1st Prize of the City of Innsbruck for painting with purchase by the Land Tirol
- 1987: 2nd prize from the city of Innsbruck in the "Cemetery Chapel Competition"
- 1988: Award for a small sculpture by International Art Competition, New York
- 1988: Art Prize of the City of Innsbruck 3rd prize for painting
- 1992: 1st prize for the Hahnenkamm poster Kitzbühel
- 1993: 3rd prize for the design of the Barbara Bridge in Schwaz. Acquisition for the 23rd Austrian Graphic Design Competition
- 1997: 2nd prize in the Alpenzoo Innsbruck poster competition
- 2002: Recognition prize for painting, Milser Kulturtage
- 2004: 1st prize, Schienenboliden competition, designing with children
- 2005: 2nd prize of the Palm Art Award, Leipzig
- 2007: 2nd prize, competition art for residential and commercial building of Neue Heimat Tirol, Schwaz project
- 2009: 1st prize for a sculpture at the international Syrlin Art Award, Germany, 1st place for sculpture "Muse", Stuttgart
- 2011: 1st place in the Land ART ideas competition, Weg zur Arzler Alm, Innsbruck
- 2014: 1st prize Tigewosi, outdoor living project, Reutte

== Publications ==
- with Alisa Stadler: A place in paradise. Hasidic stories. With pictures by Patricia Karg, Tyrolia, Innsbruck 1990, ISBN 3-7022-1740-1.
- Ausapern. Sculpture Painting Graphics. Monograph and illustrated book, numbered and signed, Tyrolia, Innsbruck 2010, ISBN 978-3-7022-2788-3.
