= Hintere Bachofenspitze =

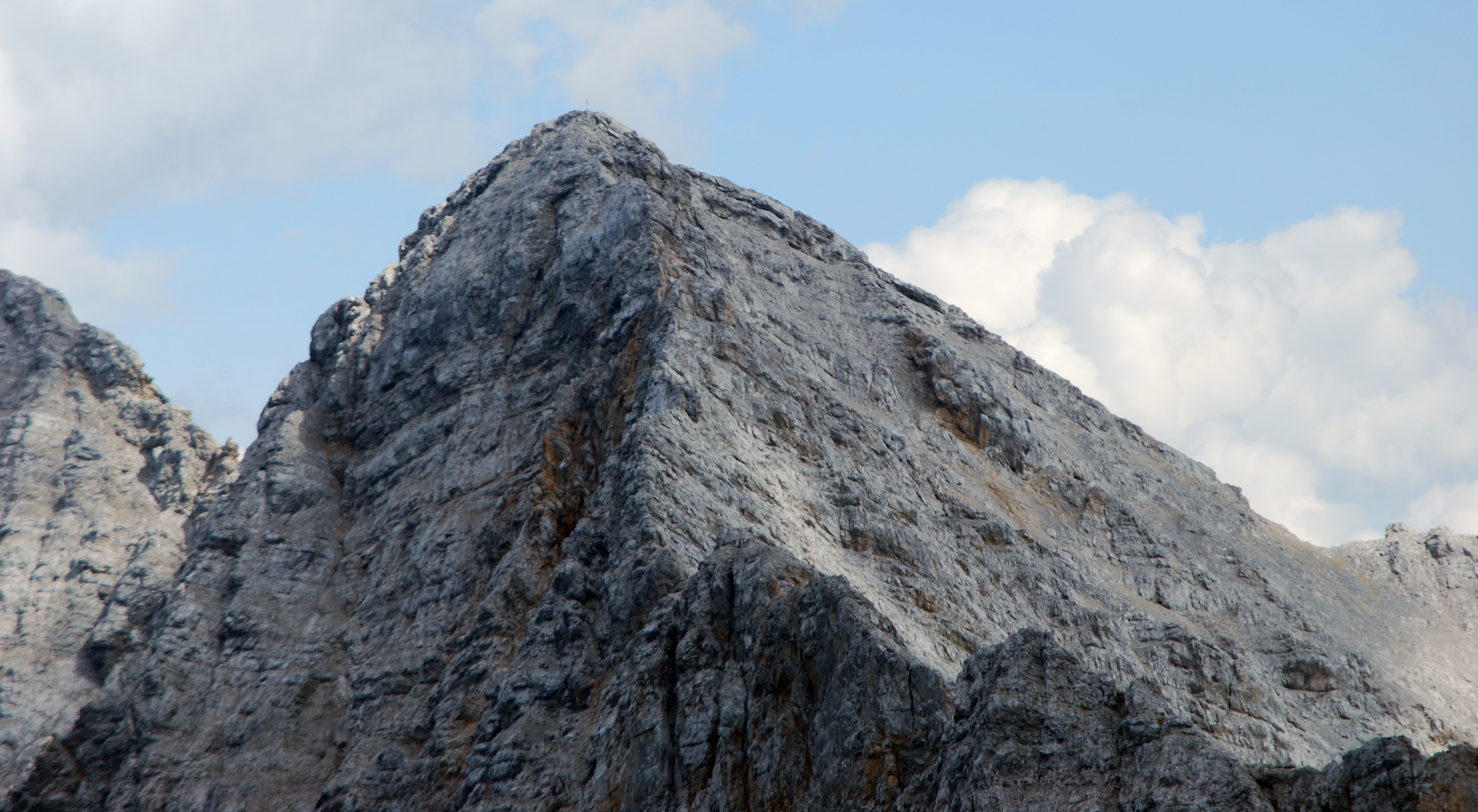
- The Hintere Bachofenspitze from the northwest

Highest point
- Elevation: 2,668 m (AA) (8,753 ft)
- Coordinates: 47°N 11°E

Geography
- Location within Austria
- Location: North of Innsbruck
- Parent range: Gleirsch-Halltal Chain, Karwendel

Geology
- Rock age: Triassic
- Mountain type: Wetterstein limestone

Climbing
- Normal route: Southwest side, UIAA II

The Hintere Bachofenspitze in the Karwendel mountains of Tyrol is 2,668 metres (8,753 ft) high and forms the northernmost point of the parish of Thaur in the Inn Valley. Since the erection of a summit cross, that was set up in October 2003 by Franz Brunner and Fritz Gostner, this summit has enjoyed growing popularity.

== Location ==
The Hintere Bachofenspitze in the second Karwendel mountain chain, known as the Gleirsch-Halltal Chain, separates the Gleirsch chain (Gleirschkette) in the west from the Hall Valley chain (Halltalkette) in the east. It is also the northernmost peak of the linking ridge (Verbindungsgrat) which runs over the Rosskopf south to the Stempeljochspitzen joining up with the Inn Valley chain. The north face of the Hintere Bachofenspitze drops 700 metres to the small Gschnierkopf in the upper Hinterau valley.

== Routes to the top ==
The easiest and shortest way to reach the summit is on the marked path from the Pfeis Hut through the Sonntagskar to the southwest. Even the route through the rock barrier of the upper section is well marked and equipped with some iron steps (UIAA II). Another route runs from the "Wilde Band Steig" in the southeast through the pathless Bachofenkar. At the back of the kar, climb through a rubbly gully north up to the gap between the summits of the Vordere and Hinterer Bachofenspitze. From here the summit is reached, either along the ridge or just below it to the west (Grade I). In addition, the peak may be gained by crossing the ridge either from the Sonntagkarspitze (III), from the Haller Rosskopf (II) or the Großer Lafatscher (II).

== Sources ==
- Walter Klier (1996), Alpenvereinsführer Karwendel alpin (in German) (14. ed.), Munich: Bergverlag Rudolf Rother, ISBN 3-7633-1121-1
