= Gina (singer) =

Austrian pop singer (born 1985)

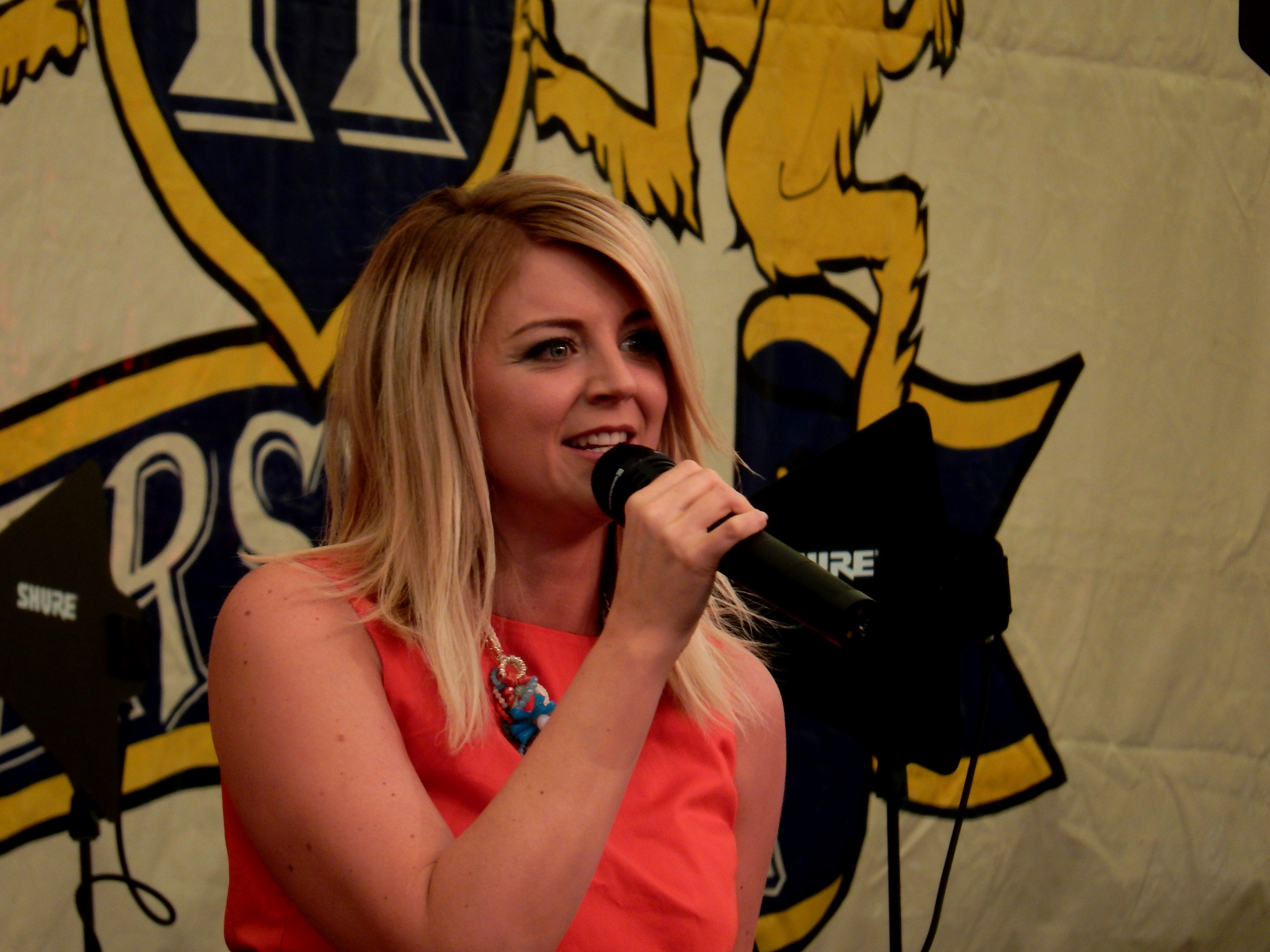
- Gina in 2017
- Born: Claudia Giner; March 13, 1985 (age 41); Hall in Tirol, Austria
- Education: FHWien of WKW
- Occupations: Singer; musician; radio editor
- Years active: 2013–present
- Musical career
- Genres: Pop
- Instruments: Vocals; clarinet

Claudia Giner (born March 13, 1985), known professionally as Gina, is an Austrian pop singer.

== Early life ==
Claudia Giner was born on March 13, 1985, in Hall in Tirol, Austria. She grew up in Thaur in Tyrol, learned to play the clarinet and played in the Thaur music group. She later worked as a radio editor, where she designed and presented articles. Gina completed her studies in Marketing and Sales Management at the FHWien of WKW in 2020 as a Master of Science. Her stage name Gina, which is also her nickname, is derived from her real last name.

== Career ==
With her debut album Frühstück auf dem Dach, produced by Felix Gauder, she entered the Austrian charts in August 2016. In August 2016, she also appeared on the show Immer wieder Sonntags on Südwestrundfunk, hosted by Stefan Mross. At the beginning of September 2016 she was seen in the Starnacht aus der Wachau on ORF and MDR, in January 2018 at the Winter Open Air of Wenn die Musi spielt.

== Discography ==
=== Albums ===
- Frühstück auf dem Dach (2016)

=== Singles ===
- "Zwillingsstern" (2016)
- "Verdammte Sehnsucht" (2017)
- "Ab durch die Mitte!" (2019)
- "Italienische Sehnsucht" (2020)
