= Großer Bettelwurf =

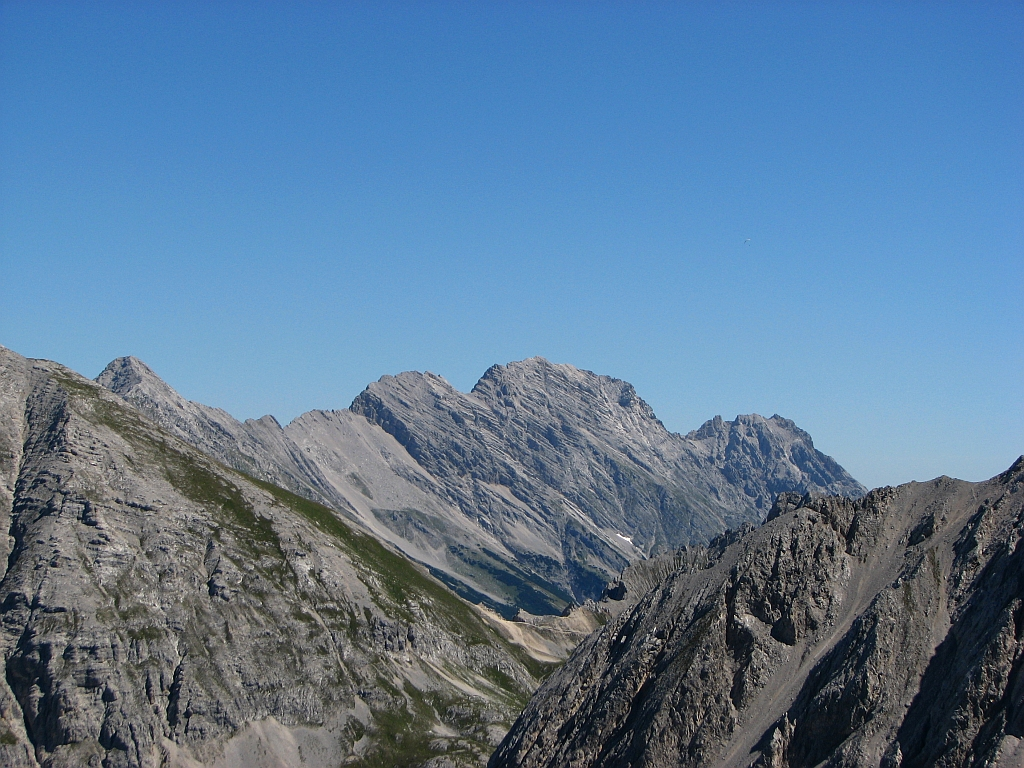
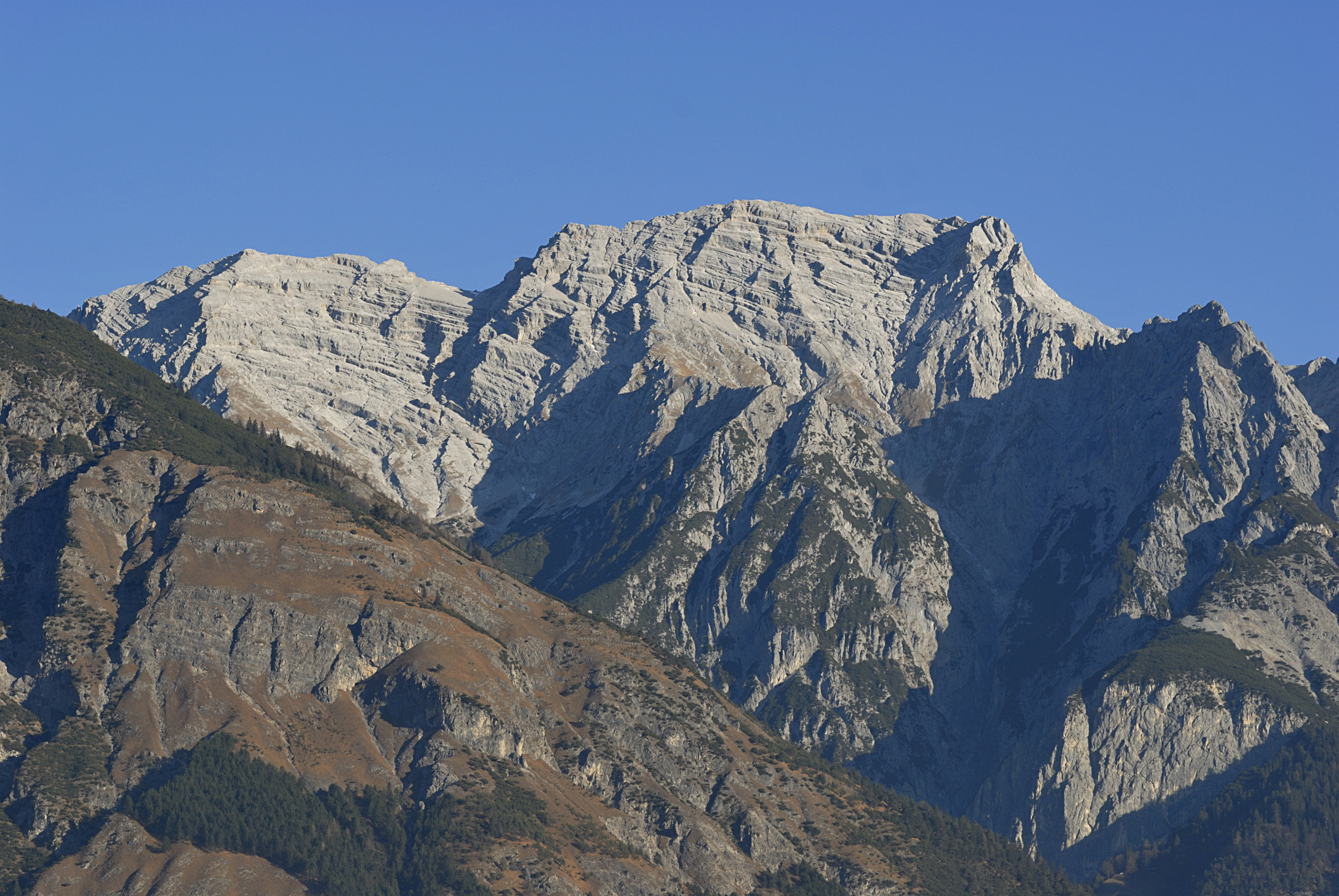
- The Kleine and Große Bettelwurf from the Mandlspitze The Kleiner and Großer Bettelwurf from the southwest (Thaur)

Highest point
- Elevation: 2,726 m (AA) (8,944 ft)
- Prominence: 814 m ↓ Überschalljoch
- Isolation: 8.4 km → Kaltwasserkarspitze
- Coordinates: 47°20′39″N 11°31′11″E

Geography
- Location within Austria
- Location: Tyrol, Austria
- Parent range: Gleirsch-Halltal Chain, Karwendel

Geology
- Rock age: Upper Anisian - Lower Carnian
- Rock type: Wetterstein Limestone

Climbing
- First ascent: ca. 1855 Ludwig Barth zu Barthenau (touristic)
- Normal route: Eisengatter arête/South flank (grade I)

The Großer Bettelwurf is a mountain, 2,726 m (AA), and thus the highest peak in the Gleirsch-Halltal Chain in the Karwendel mountains of Tyrol. It is also the fourth highest summit in the Karwendel. The neighbouring Kleiner Bettelwurf reaches a height of 2,650 m (AA).
