= Gleirsch-Halltal Chain =

Mountain range in Austria

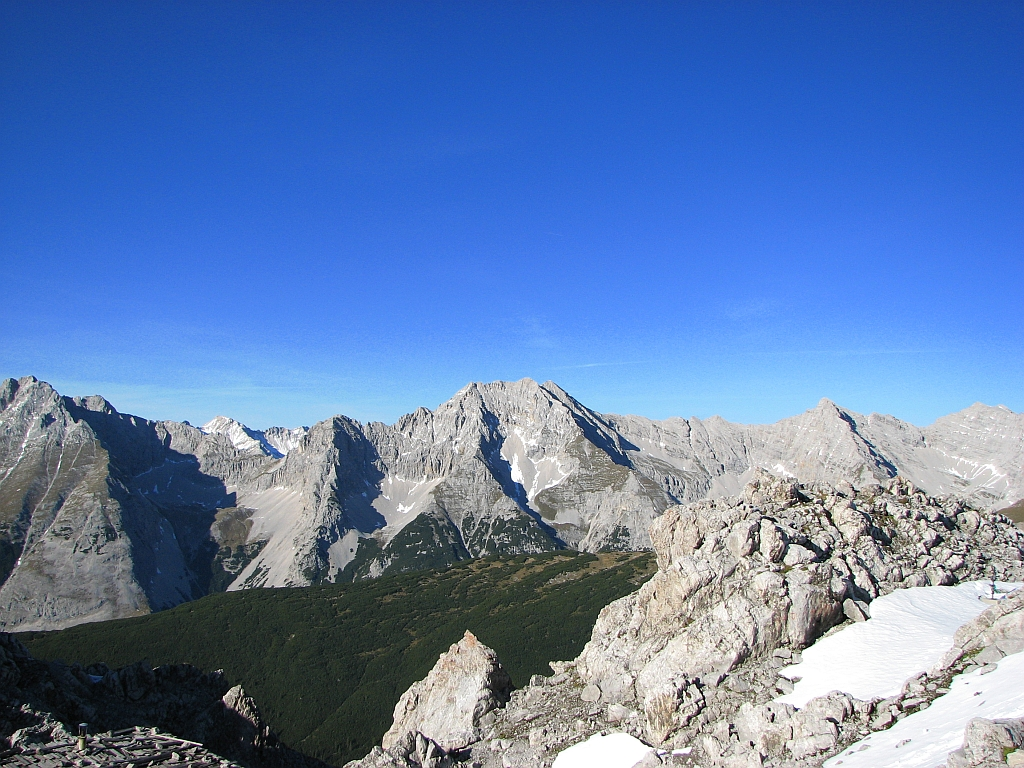
- The Praxmarerkarspitzen from the Nordkette

Highest point
- Peak: Großer Bettelwurf
- Elevation: 2,726 m above sea level (AA)

Dimensions
- Area: 117.7 km^{2} (45.4 mi^{2})

Geography
- Location within Austria
- Location: Tyrol, Austria
- Range coordinates: 47°20′45″N 11°26′00″E
- Parent range: Karwendel

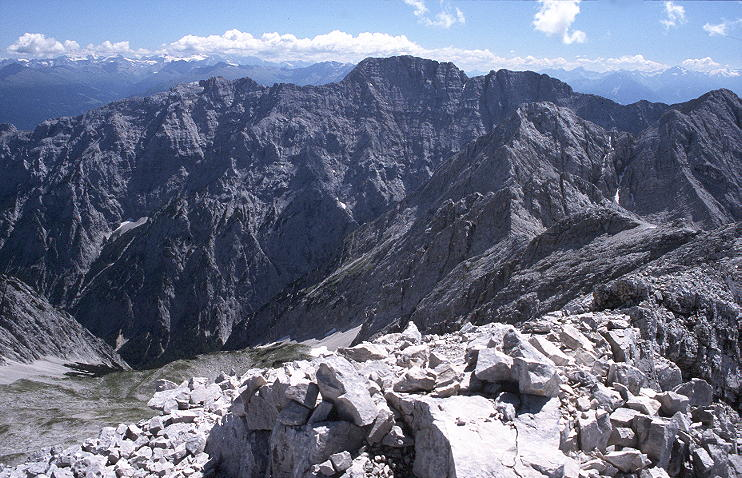
The Großer and Kleiner Bettelwurf from the north

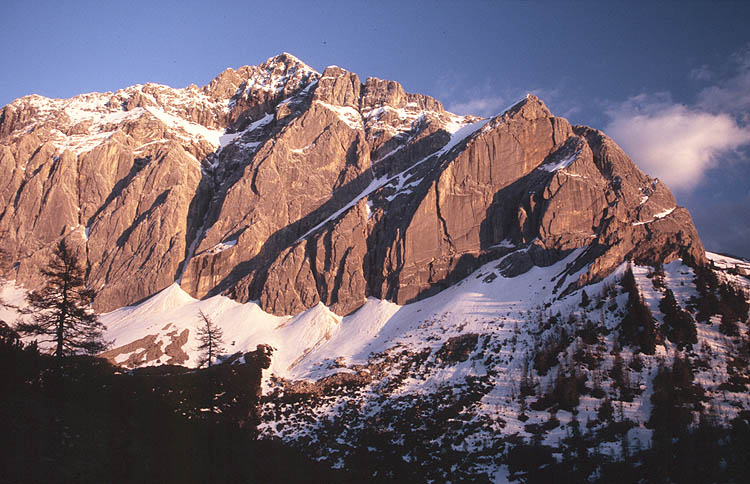
The north face of the Speckkarspitze in the fading dusk

The Gleirsch-Halltal Chain (German: Gleirsch-Halltal-Kette) or Gleirsch-Halltal Range is a mountain chain in the Karwendel in the Northern Limestone Alps. It follows to the south of the Hinterautal-Vomper Chain, the longest mountain chain in the Karwendel. South of the Stempeljochspitze on the other side of the Stempeljoch saddle (2,215 m (AA)) it is joined to the Nordkette. The name of the range is derived from the two valleys: the Gleirschtal to the west and southwest and the Halltal to the southeast.

Its highest summit is the Großer Bettelwurf (2,726 m (AA)), which towers 2,200 metres over the Inn valley. Other well known peaks are its two "cornerstones". First, the Lafatscher Joch (2,081 m (AA)), which forms the only crossing from the Hinterau valley to the Halltal: the Speckkarspitze, the Kleiner Lafatscher with the famous Verschneidung and the Großer Lafatscher. From Scharnitz the western cornerstone of the chain, the Hoher Gleirsch, may easily be climbed. The summits in the centre section of the Gleirsch-Halltal Chain between Möslalm and the Pfeishütte (Jägerkarspitzen, Praxmarerkarspitzen, Kaskarspitze, Sonntagkarspitze, Hintere Bachofenspitze) can only be reached with difficulty, on sometimes trackless routes requiring some climbing and not always on firm rock.

The Gleirsch-Halltal Chain has steep rock faces towards the north, typical of the four great Karwendel chains, which in places drop for several hundred metres. All noteworthy peaks are made of Wetterstein limestone, which was predominantly formed in the Middle Triassic in lagoons and areas of coral reef. Only the far eastern Walder Joch (1,636 m (AA)) is built of Jurassic limestone and main dolomite.

Important peaks (in sequence from west to east)

- Hoher Gleirsch (2,492 m (AA))
- Oberer Sagkopf (2,154 m (AA))
- Großer Katzenkopf (2,531 m (AA))
- Äußere Riegelkarspitze (2,407 m (AA))
- Innere Riegelkarspitze (2,438 m (AA))
- Mittlere Jägerkarspitze (2,608 m (AA))
- Hinterödkopf (2,453 m (AA))
- Jägerkarlspitze (2,470 m (AA))
- Westliche Praxmarerkarspitze (2,638 m (AA))
- Östliche Praxmarerkarspitze (2,638 m (AA))
- Kaskarspitze (2,580 m (AA))
- Sonntagkarspitze (2,575 m (AA))
- Hintere Bachofenspitze (2,668 m (AA))
- Vordere Bachofenspitze (2,663 m (AA))
- Rosskopf (2,670 m (AA))
- Stempeljochspitze (2,543 m (AA))
- Großer Lafatscher (2,696 m (AA))
- Kleiner Lafatscher (2,636 m (AA))
- Speckkarspitze (2,621 m (AA))
- Signalkopf (2,504 m (AA))
- Kleiner Bettelwurf (2,650 m (AA))
- Großer Bettelwurf (2,726 m (AA))
- Hohe Fürleg (2,570 m (AA))
- Hundskopf (2,243 m (AA))
- Walder Joch (1,636 m (AA))
