= Clotilde Kainerstorfer =

Austrian composer (1833–1897)

Clotilde Kainerstorfer (2 July 1833 – 26 September 1897) was an Austrian composer born in Hall in Tirol. She composed sacred works and published ten pieces for piano and organ in Augsburg in 1878 as her first known compositions. She died in 1897 in Linz.

== Works ==
Selected works include:

- 10 Weihnachts-Lieder (No. 1. "Gottes Lob soll heut erschallen," No. 2. "Sei uns willkommen," No. 3. "Engelssang, Himmelsklang," No. 4. Gloria (Choral): "Preis u. Ehre in den Höhen," No. 5. "Sei du uns gegrüsset," No. 6. "Wie winket so freundlich," No. 7. "Lasst uns Gespielen," No. 8. "Erwecket durch himmlische Klänge," No. 9. "Voll Jubel u. Freude," No. 10. Gloria (Choral): "Ehre sei Gott in der Höbe," November 1878
- Marien-Blumen, Song in honor of the Blessed Virgin Mary, April 1881.
- Marienlied: Der Tag entflieht (The Day Escapes), November 1880
- Offertorium: Ad te Domine levavi, November 1878.
- Salve Regina. Marienlied zur Maiandacht, August 1882.
- Siona (latein. u. deutscher Text), November 1880.
- O salutaris hostia, February 1878
