= Hasegg Castle =

Castle in Tyrol, Austria

- Hall in Tirol, Tyrol, Austria
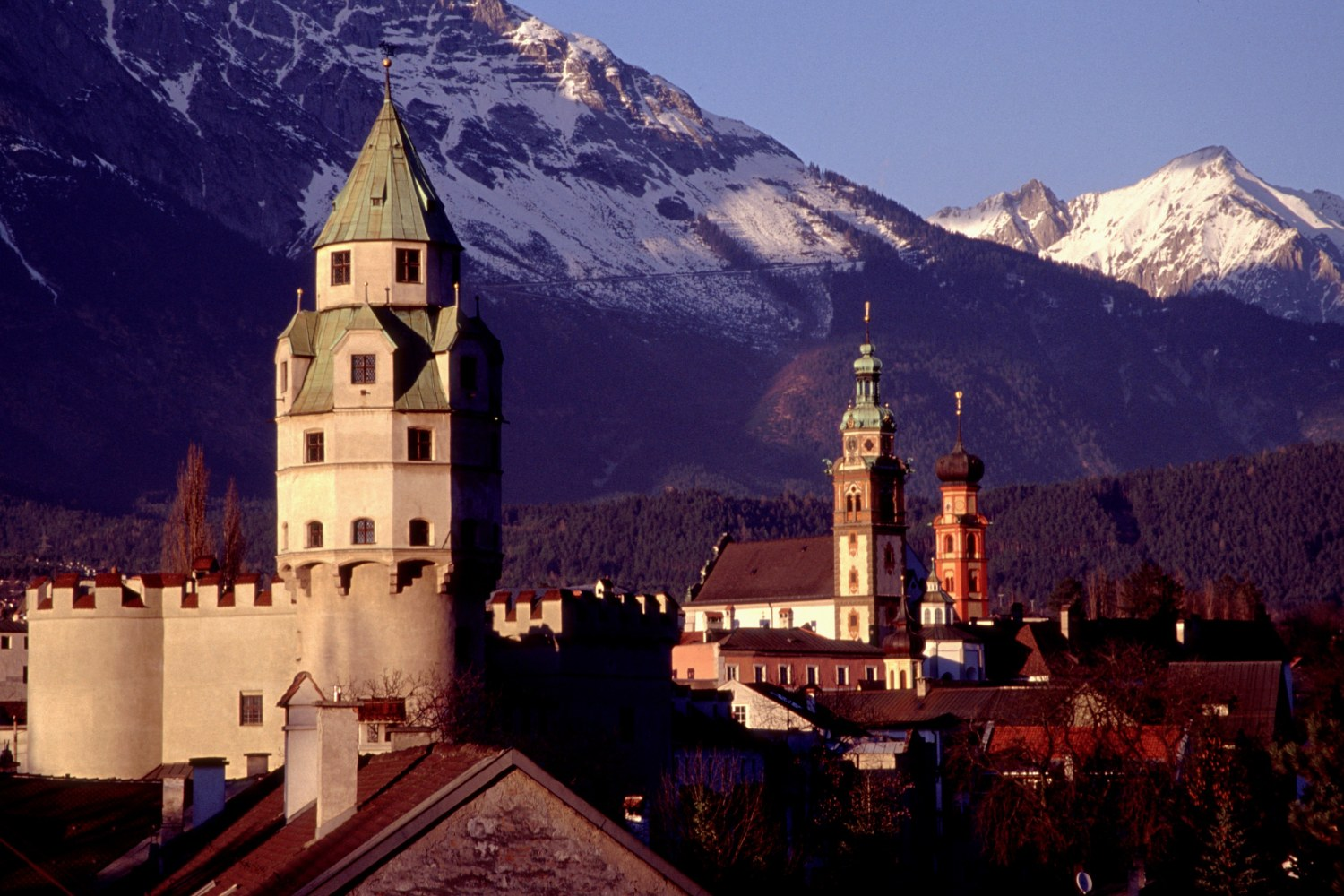
- The Mint Tower or "Münzerturm" is a landmark of the town of Hall.

Site information
- Type: Castle, Mint
- Open to the public: Yes
- Condition: Museum

Location
- Coordinates: 47°17′N 11°30′E

Site history
- Built: mentioned 1306; established as mint 1477
- In use: 1477–1806

Hasegg Castle (German: Burg Hasegg) is a castle and mint located in Hall in Tirol, Tyrol, Austria.

Construction was completed soon after 1300, when Hall was rapidly becoming the center of Tyrolean commerce and salt mining. The building was originally erected to protect the salt mines, the shipping industry, the bridge across the river Inn and the old Roman road. The castle's mint was established by Sigismund, Archduke of Austria in 1477. The first dollar-size silver coin was struck in 1486: the Guldengroschen.

When Ferdinand II, Archduke of Austria had the old mint transferred from the Castle of Sparberegg to Hasegg in 1567, Hall experienced a decisive upswing. Between 1748 and 1768, Hasegg Castle became universally famous for its minting of silver Thalers of which it produced over 17 million specimens. The Thaler, a silver coin used throughout Europe for almost four hundred years, sees its name live on in various currencies as the "dollar" or "tolar".

The mint ceased production in 1806 due to the Napoleonic Wars and the increasing lack of local silver resources.

The mint is a museum since 1975 (Museum Münze Hall) and open to the general public. Demonstrations of historical minting techniques are given from time to time. The castle itself is an example of early Gothic era Tirolean fortress architecture. The pointed roof of the mint tower is of heavily tarnished copper.
