= Hall in Tirol =

- Municipality
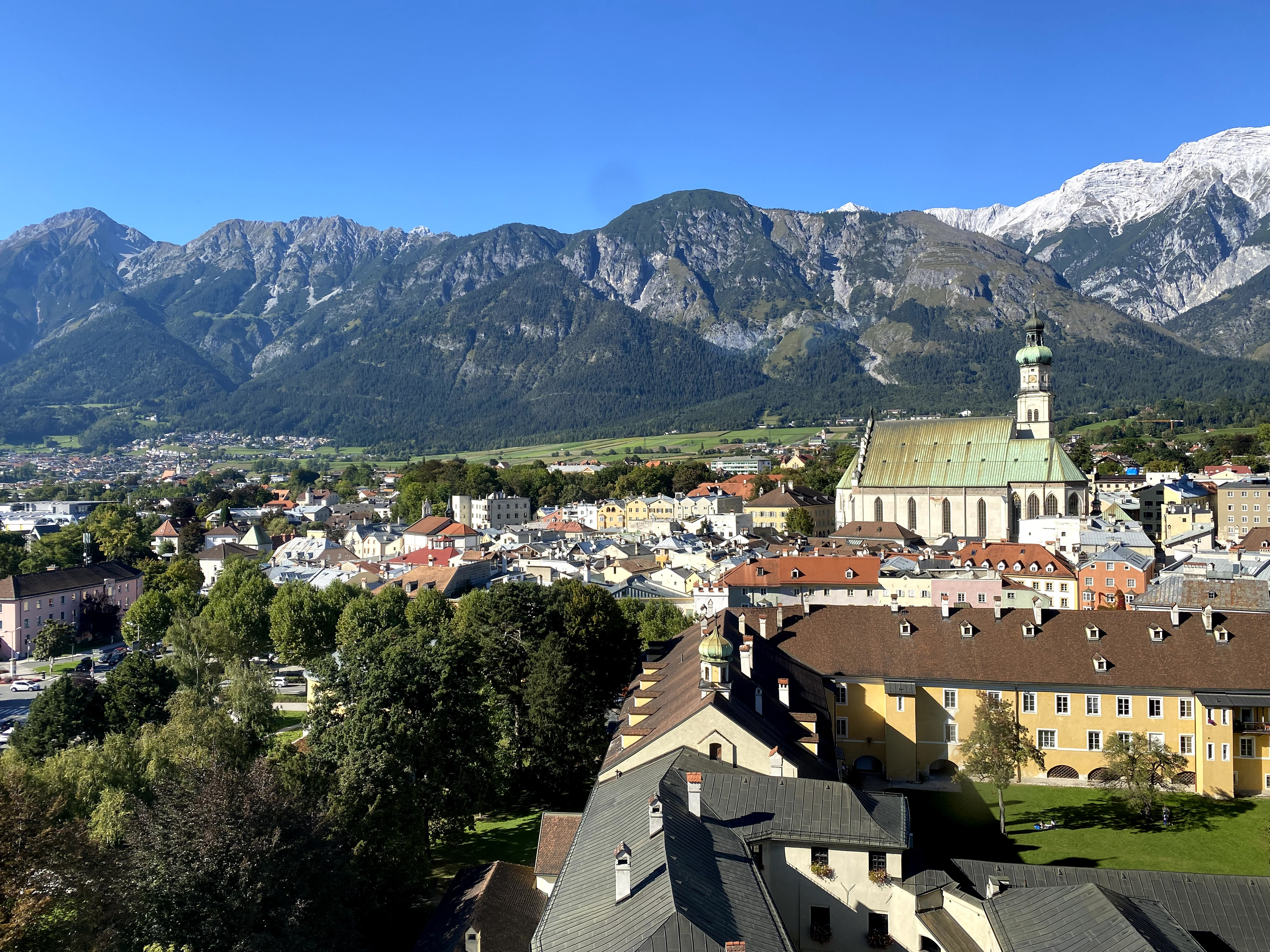
- The oldtown of Hall with Karwendel range

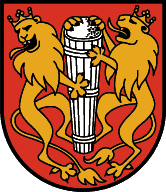
- Coat of arms

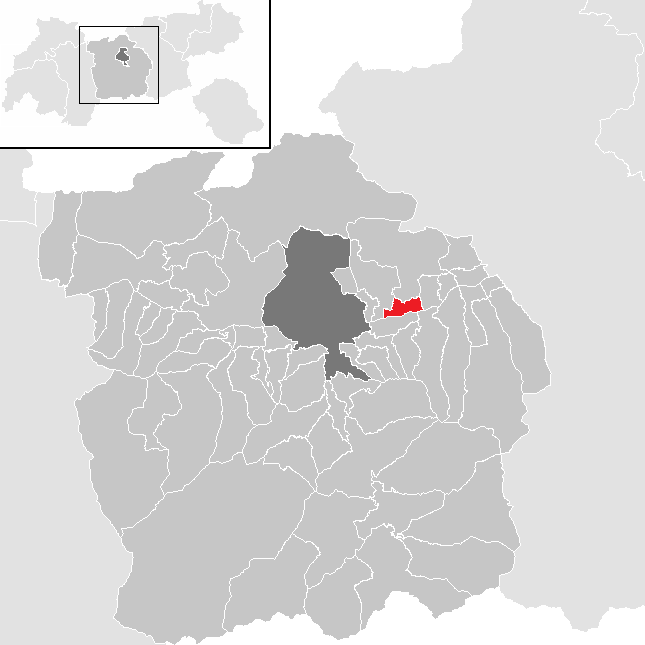
- Location in the district

- Location within Austria Hall in Tirol (Austria)
- Coordinates: 47°17′N 11°30′E
- Country: Austria
- State: Tyrol
- District: Innsbruck Land

Government
  - Mayor: Christian Margreiter (FÜR HALL)

Area
  - Total: 5.54 km^{2} (2.14 sq mi)
- Elevation: 574 m (1,883 ft)

Population (2023-12-31)
  - Total: 14,771
  - Density: 2,670/km^{2} (6,910/sq mi)
- Time zone: UTC+1 (CET)
  - Summer (DST): UTC+2 (CEST)
- Postal code: 6060
- Area code: 05223
- Vehicle registration: IL
- Website: www.hall-in-tirol.at

Hall in Tirol is a town in the Innsbruck-Land district of Tyrol, Austria. Located at an altitude of 574 m, about 5 km (3 mi) east of the state's capital Innsbruck in the Inn valley, it has a population of 14,771 (Dec 2023).

== History ==
Hall in the County of Tyrol was first mentioned as a salina (saltern) near Thaur castle in a 1232 deed. The current name dates back to 1256, and similarly to Halle, Hallein, Schwäbisch Hall or Hallstatt is derived from the Celtic word for salt.

Since the 13th century, the salt mine at Absam in the Hall Valley north of the town formed the main industry of the town and its surroundings. The first adit was laid out in 1272 at the behest of Count Meinhard II of Tyrol, with the brine channeled by a 10 km (6 mi) long pipeline to the evaporation pond at Hall. The importance of the salt industry, which exported goods as far as Switzerland, the Black Forest, and the Rhine valley, is reflected in Hall's coat of arms, which shows two lions holding a cask of salt. In 1303, Hall became a town. The rights that came with this, as well as the business associated with trading from Hall downriver on Inn and Danube, turned it into the leading market and trading place in the northern parts of Tyrol. Its development suffered a serious setback in 1447, when large parts of the upper town area were razed by a fire. In 1477, it got the right of coinage, when the Tyrolian mint was moved from Meran to Hall. In 1486, the mint produced the first large silver coin Guldengroschen in Europe. In the 16th century, the mint in Hall also introduced the world's first automated coining machine. Today a reconstruction of this revolutionary machine can be seen in the Hall Mint Museum in the Burg Hasegg.

In the 15th and 16th centuries, Hall was one of the most important towns in the Habsburg Empire. This period saw the construction of many of the churches, monasteries and convents that still shape the appearance of the town. Today Hall has the biggest intact old town in the western part of Austria.

During the Habsburg monarchy, a military garrison was established in Hall. This, along with the large freight train station, became a target of heavy bombardment during World War II, which destroyed the train station but left the old town almost unscathed.

From 1938 to 1974, the town was called Solbad Hall. "Solbad" was dropped from the town name a few years after the salt mine was closed in 1967.

== Population ==
Historical population
Year	Pop.	±%
1869	5,333	—
1880	5,657	+6.1%
1890	5,982	+5.7%
1900	6,438	+7.6%
1910	7,365	+14.4%
1923	7,454	+1.2%
1934	8,657	+16.1%
1939	9,349	+8.0%
1951	10,075	+7.8%
1961	10,811	+7.3%
1971	12,873	+19.1%
1981	12,614	−2.0%
1991	12,368	−2.0%
2001	11,492	−7.1%
2011	12,695	+10.5%

== Climate ==
Climate type is dominated by the winter season, a long, bitterly cold period with short, clear days, relatively little precipitation mostly in the form of snow, and low humidity. The Köppen Climate Classification subtype for this climate is "Dfc" (Continental Subarctic Climate).

== Gallery ==
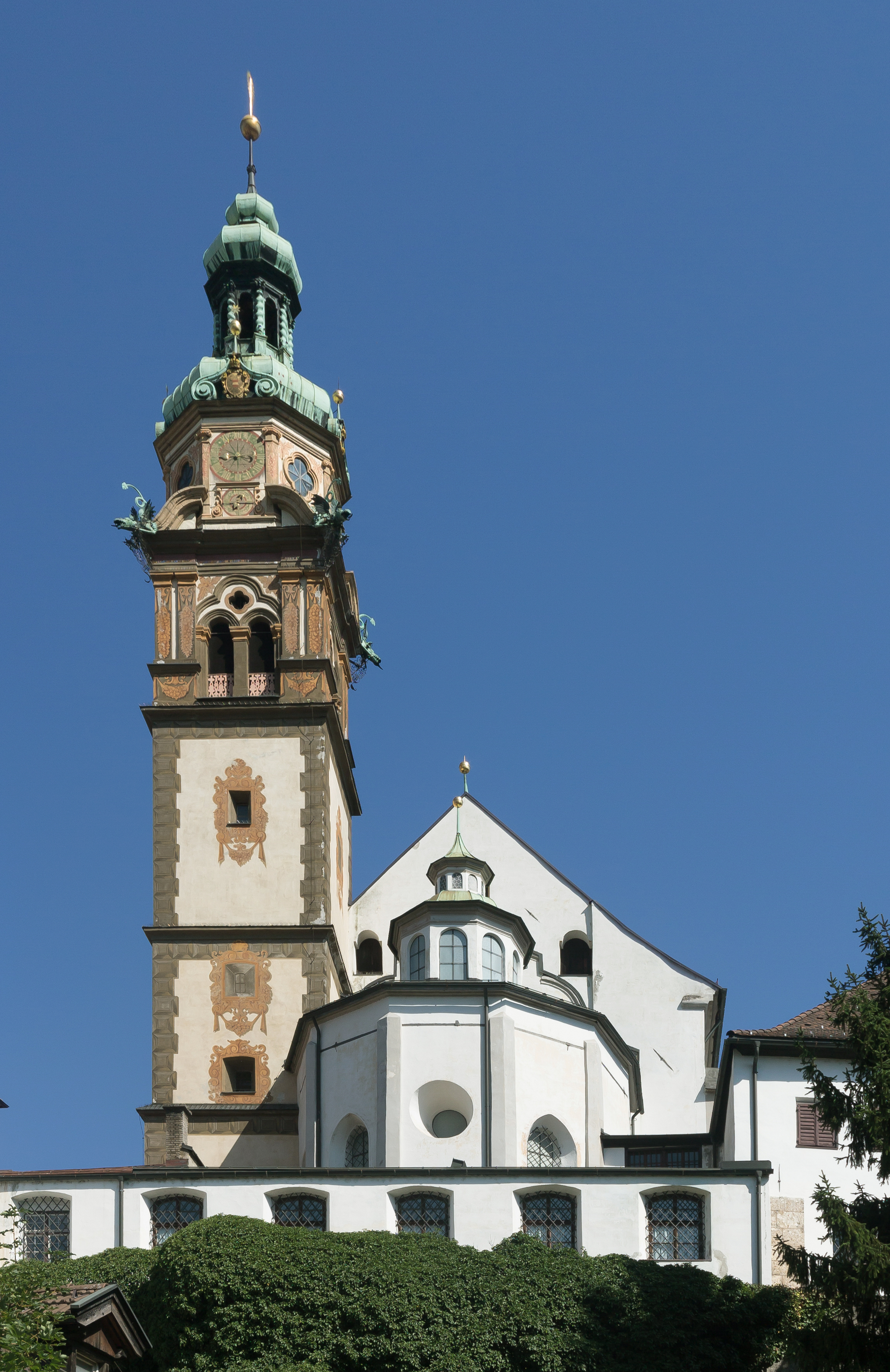
Basilica: Herz Jesu Basilika

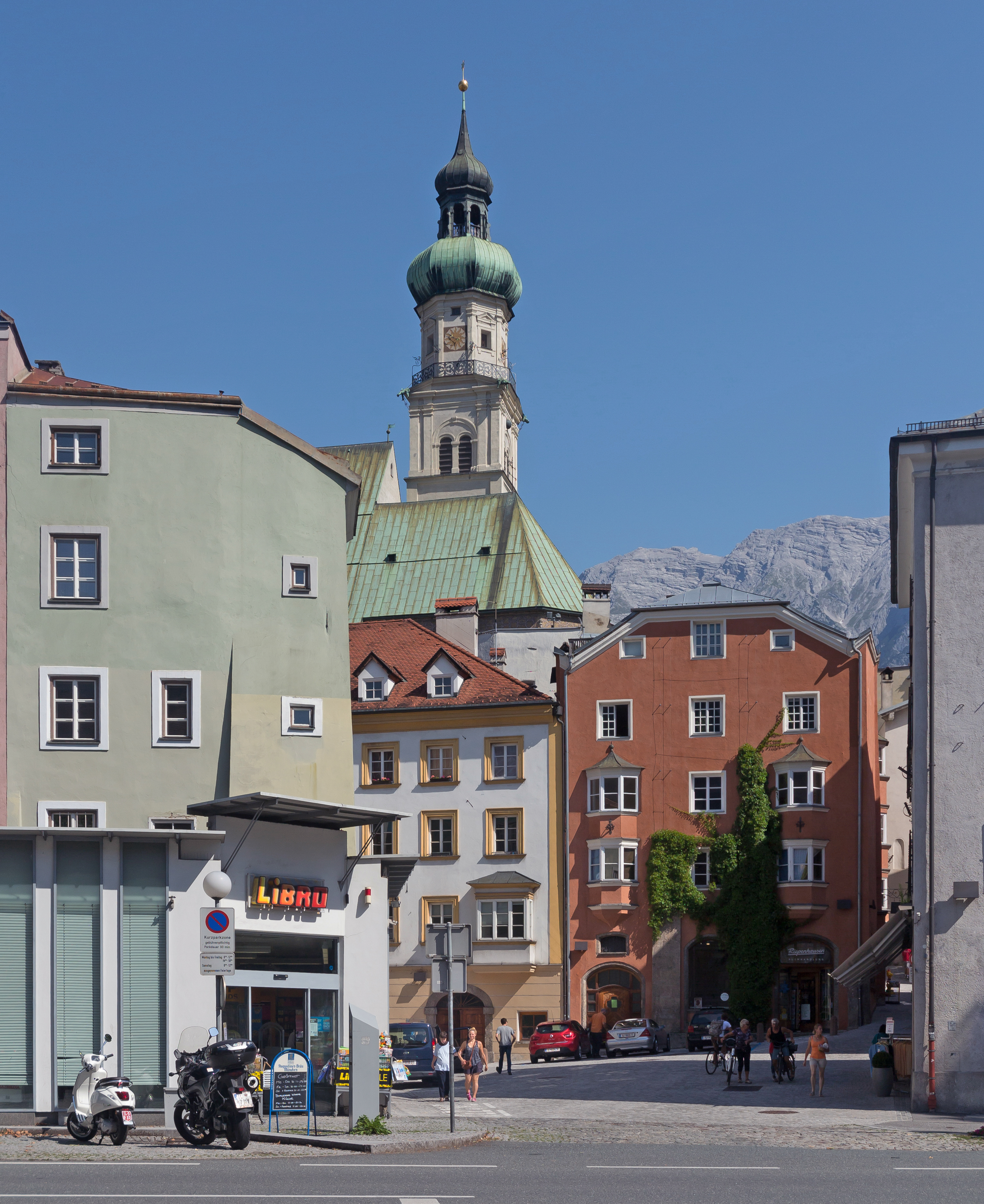
Church: die Allerheiligenkirche (former Jesuit church)

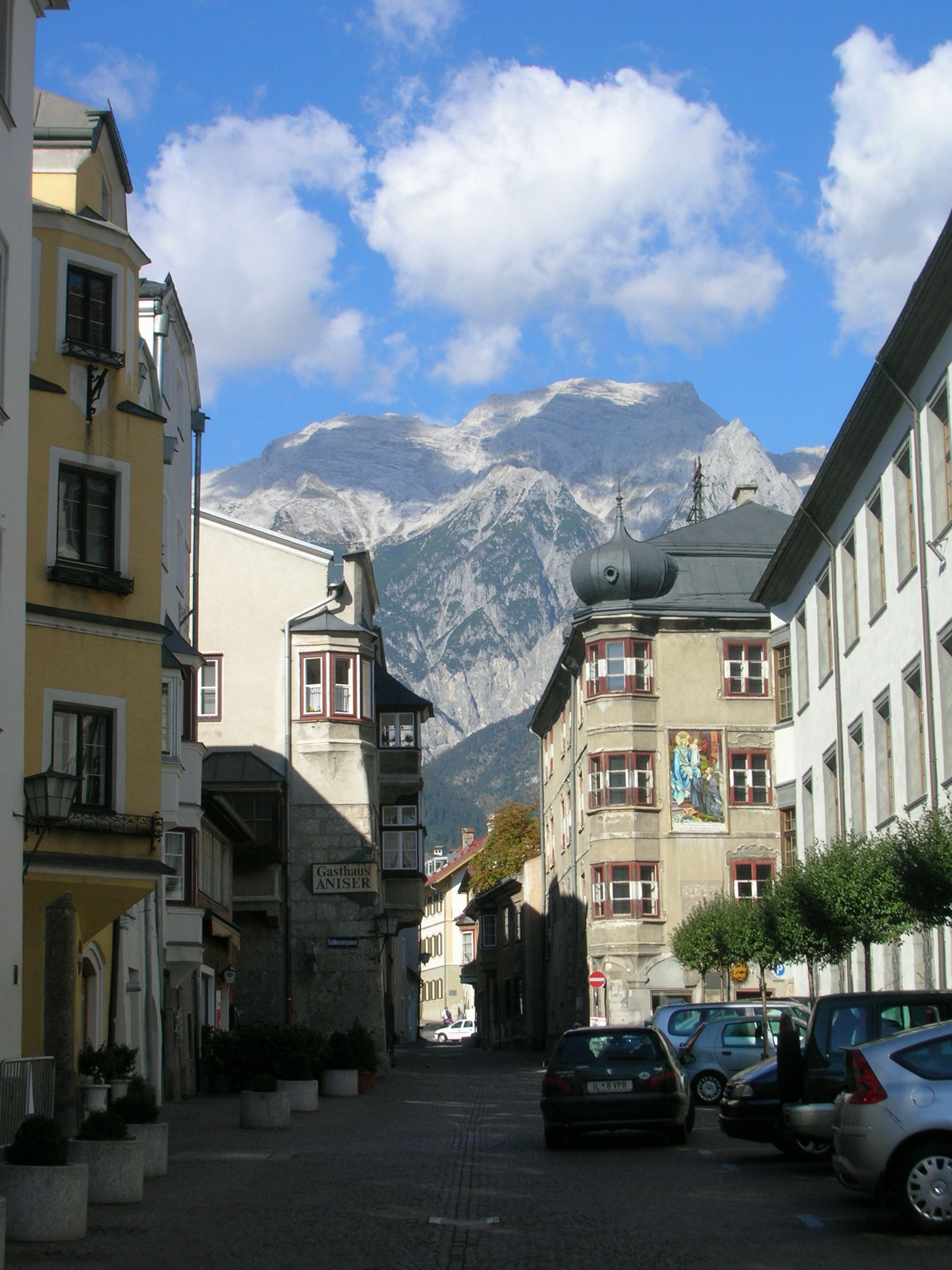
Street view with Mount Bettelwurf in background

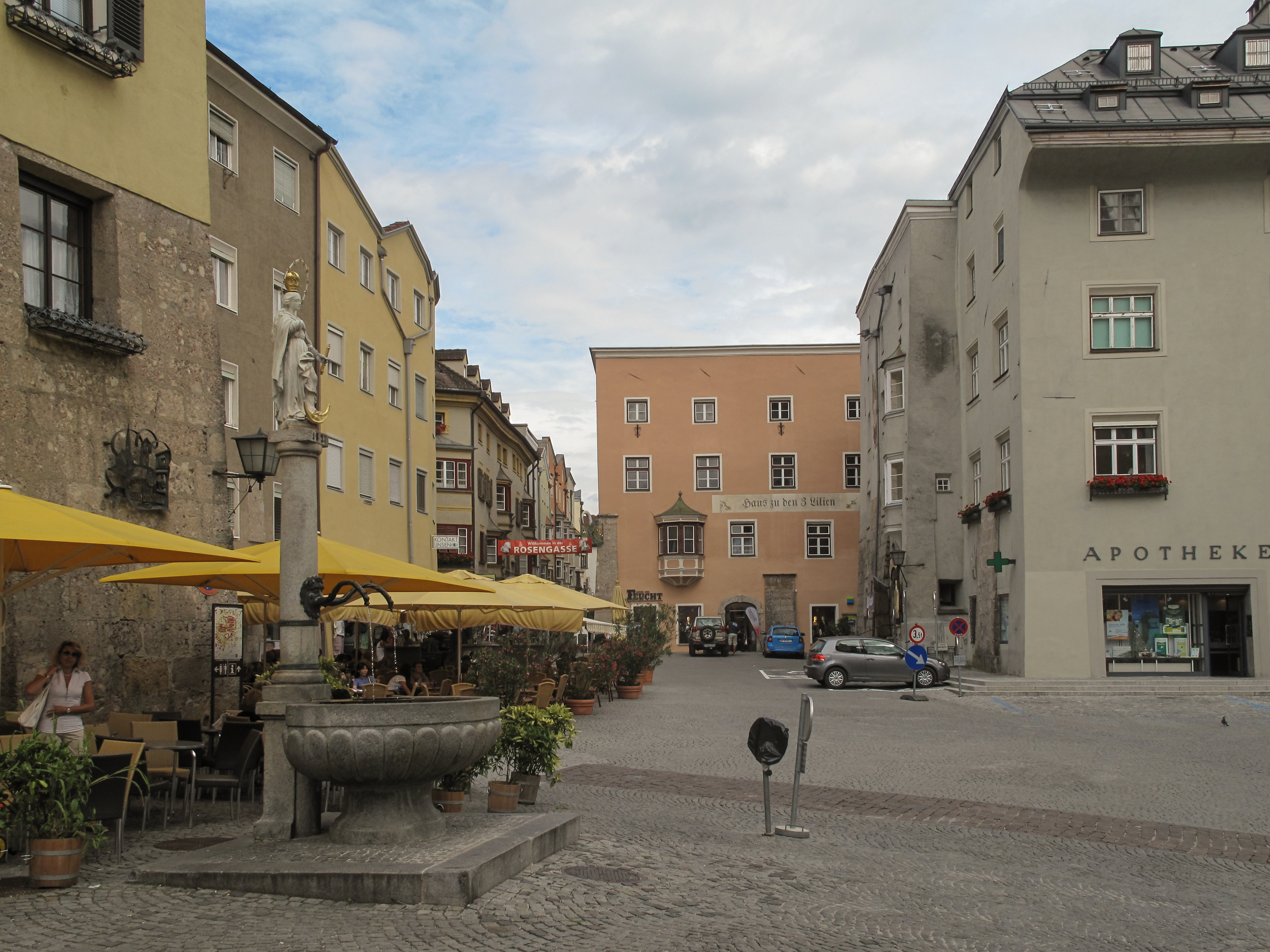
View to Rosengasse-Mustergasse

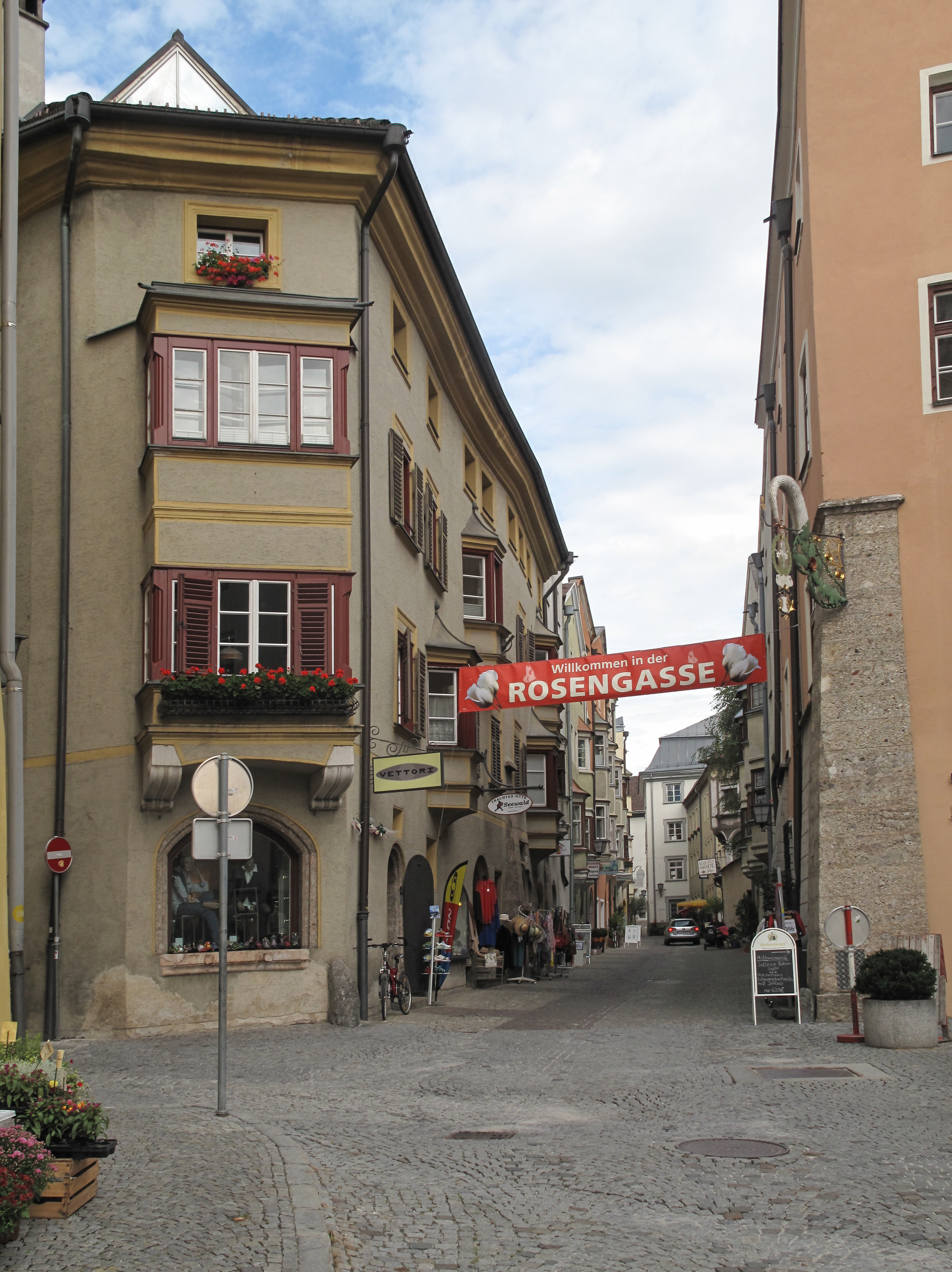
View to the Rosengasse

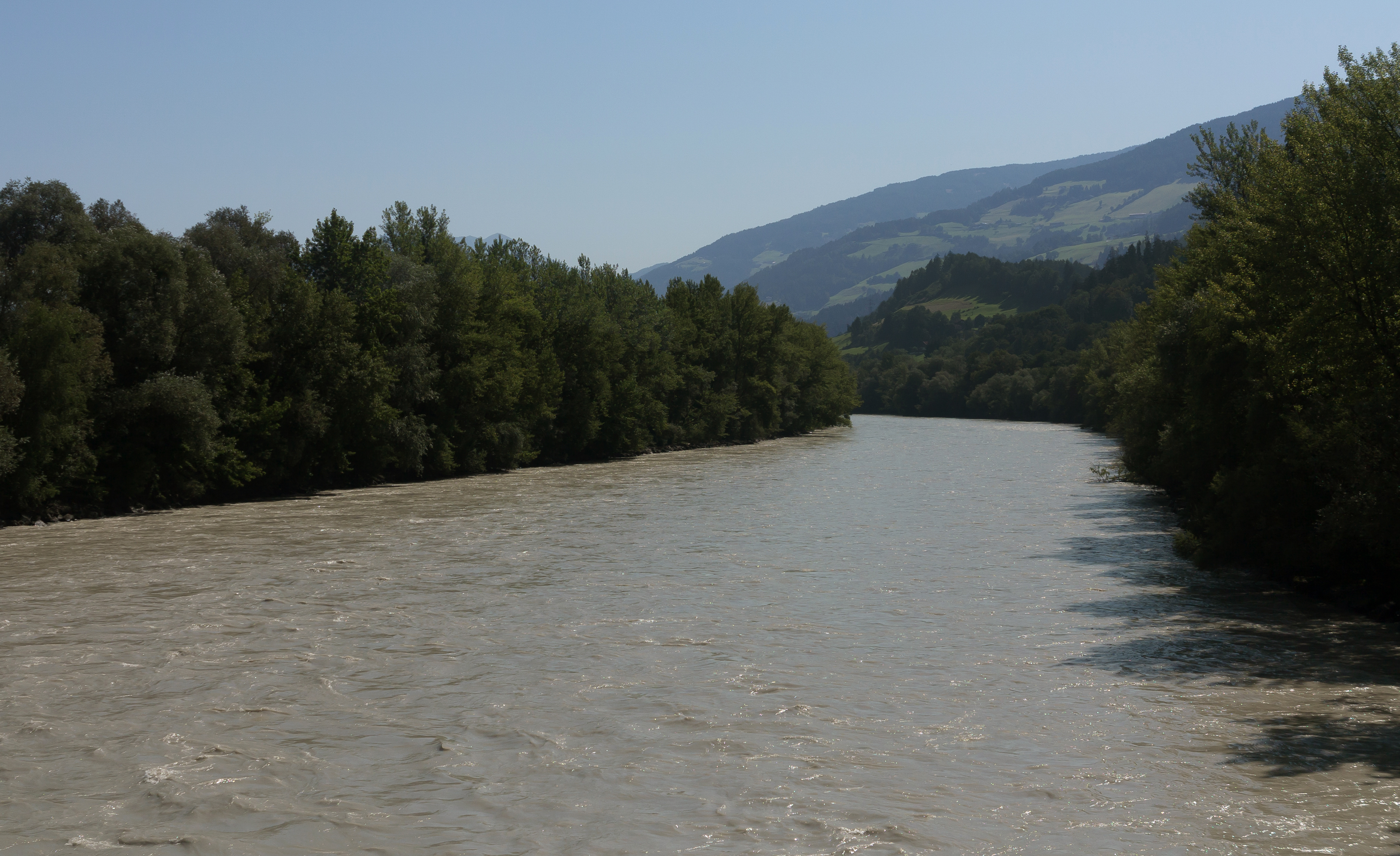
The Inn River near Hall

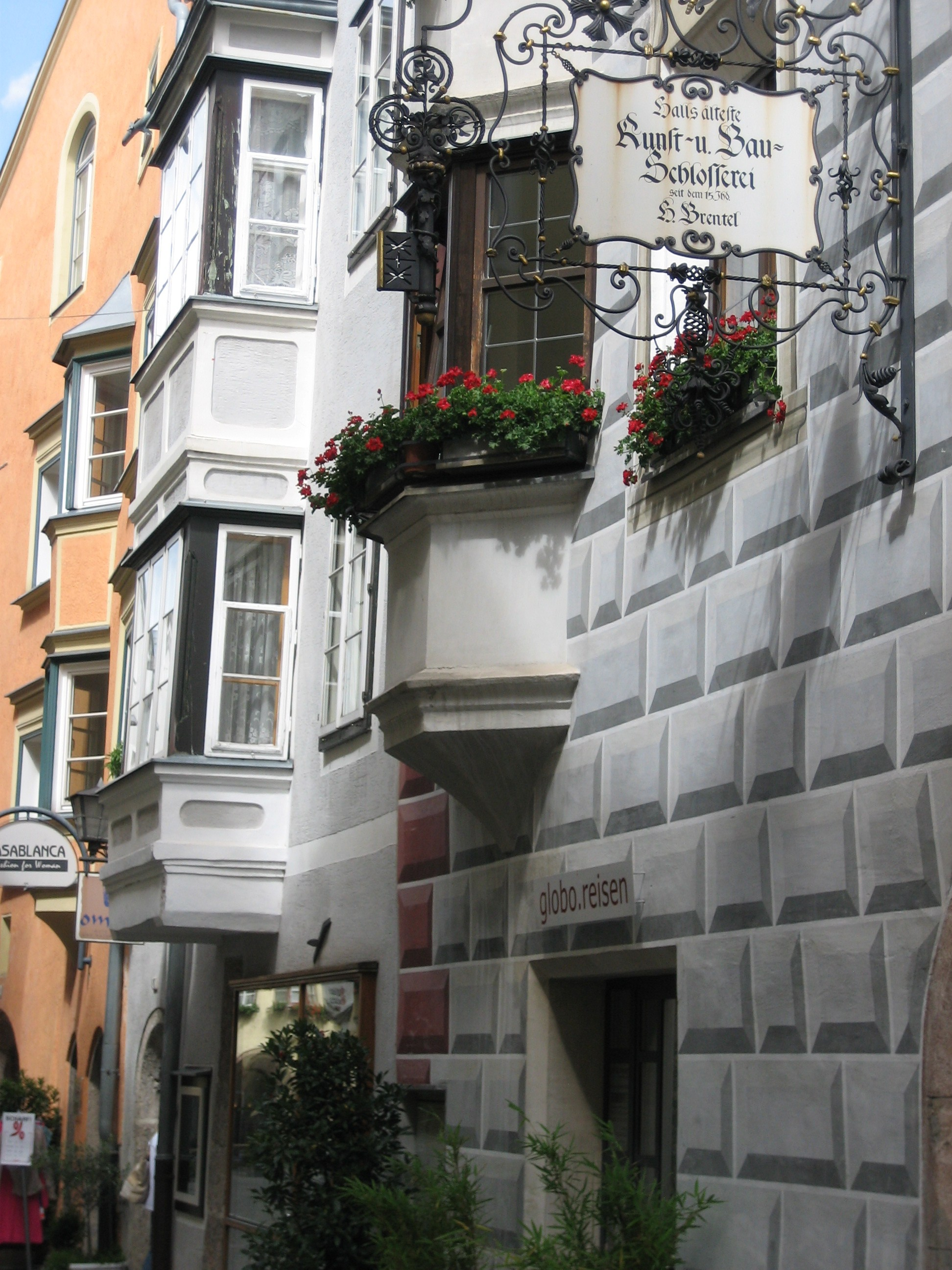
The central Schlöglstraße in Hall in Tirol

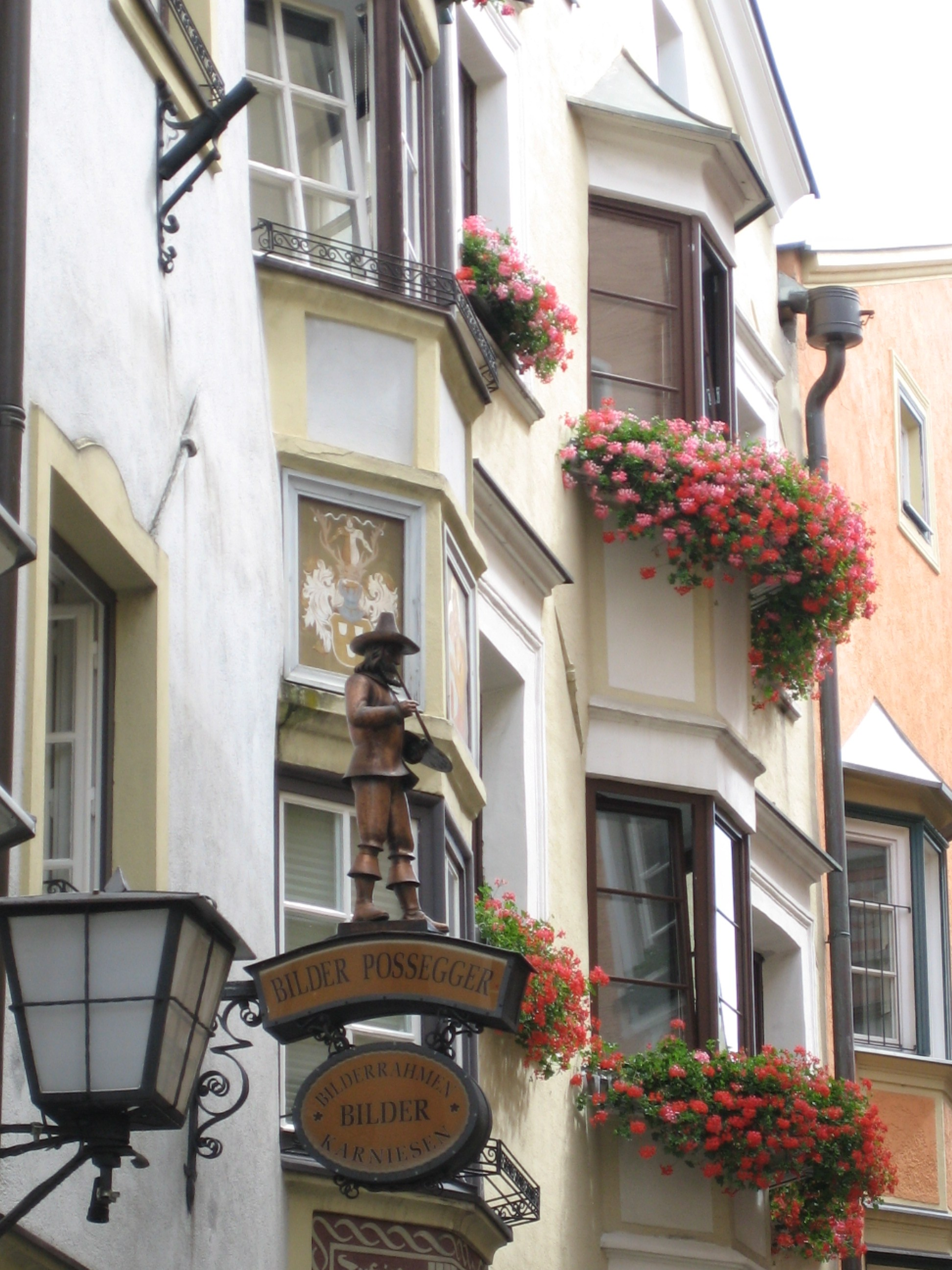
Bow windows in Hall in Tirol

== Notable people ==
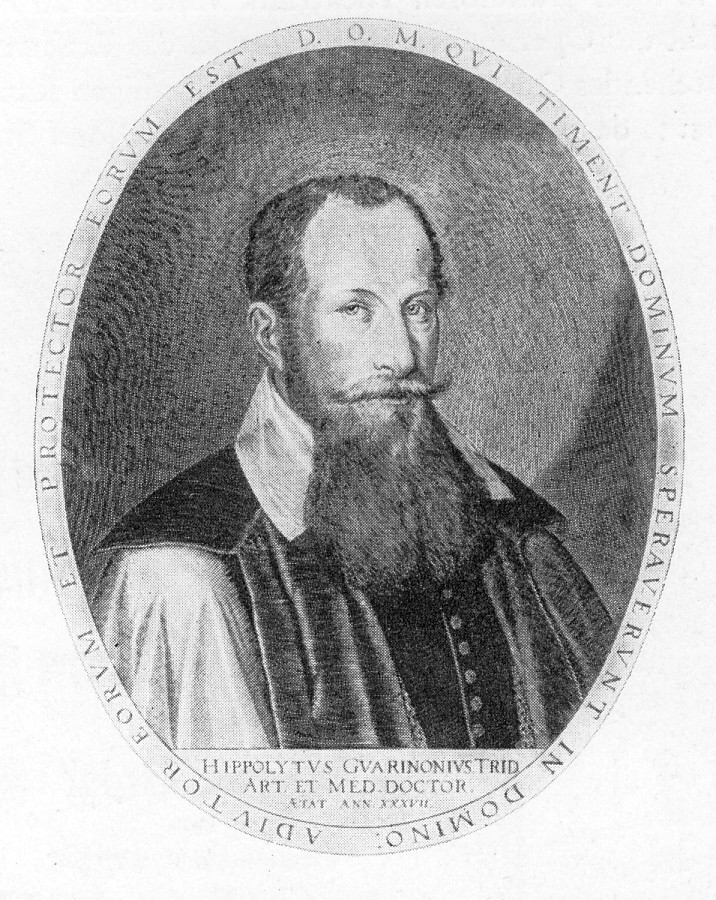
Hippolyt Guarinoni, 1610

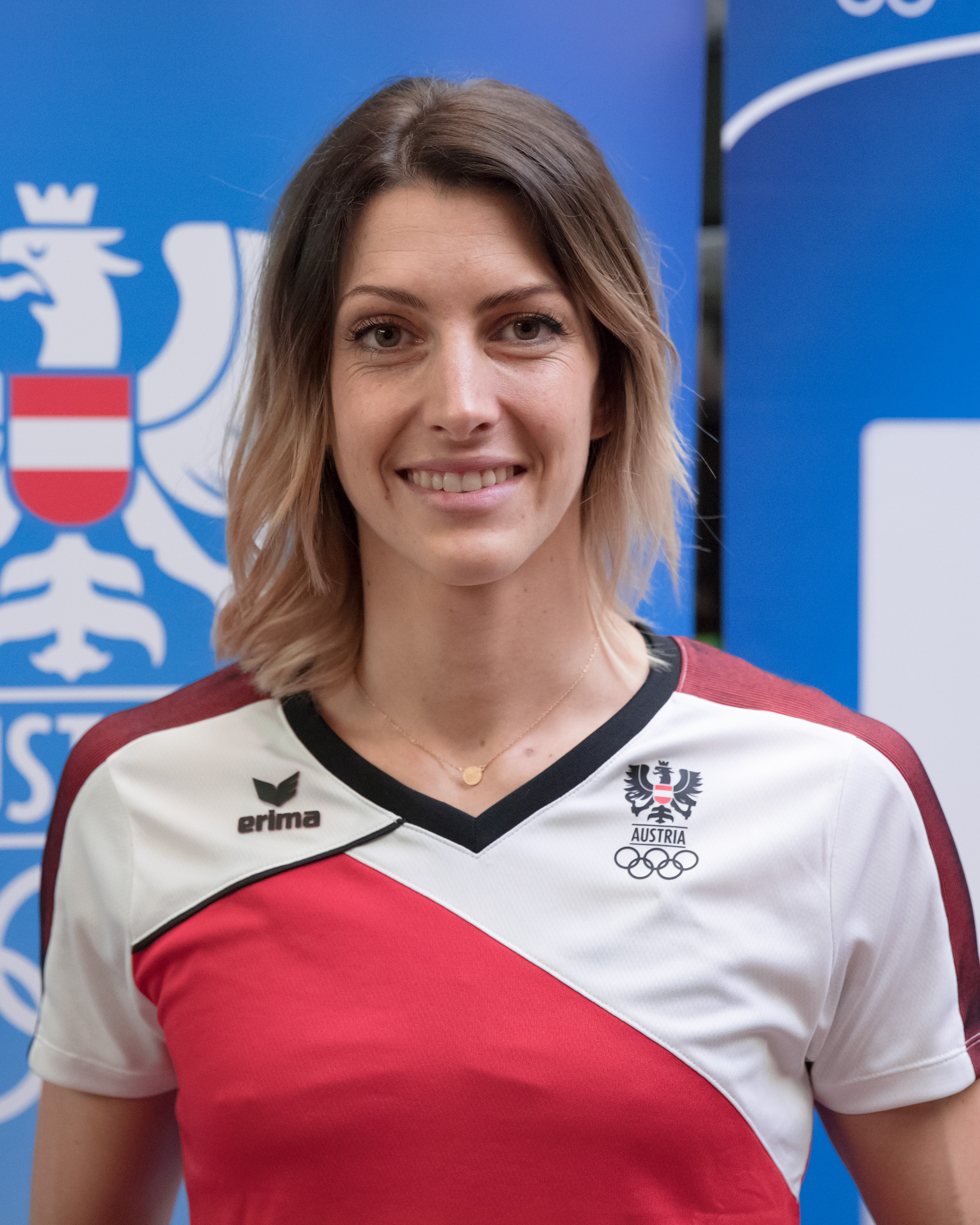
Janine Flock, 2018

- Blasius Ammon (1558–1590), an Austrian Franciscan friar and Catholic priest, who was also a composer and singer
- Christoph Grienberger (1561–1636), the Jesuit astronomer.
- Hippolytus Guarinonius (1571–1654), a Tridentine physician and polymath, lived locally
- Clotilde Kainerstorfer (1833–1897), an Austrian composer of sacred works for piano and organ
- Otto Stolz (1842–1905), an Austrian mathematician, worked on mathematical analysis and infinitesimals.
- Werner Pirchner (1940–2001), an Austrian composer and jazz musician.
- Ingrid Felipe (born 1978), an Austrian politician from the Green Party; second deputy Governor of Tyrol since 2013
- Claudia Giner (born 1985), an Austrian pop singer

=== Sport ===
- Klaus Dibiasi (born 1947), three time Olympic diving gold medallist.
- Andreas Felder (born 1962), an Austrian former ski jumper and team silver medallist at the 1992 Winter Olympics
- Ernst Vettori (born 1964), former ski jumper and gold and team silver medallist at the 1992 Winter Olympics
- Michael Streiter (born 1966), former football player and coach, played 452 games and 34 for Austria
- Christoph Bieler (born 1977), former Nordic combined skier and gold medallist at the 2006 Winter Olympics
- Andreas Schrott (born 1981), an Austrian football manager and former player who played over 270 games
- Andreas Linger (born 1981), an Austrian former luger and team gold medallist at the 2006 and 2010 Winter Olympics
- Wolfgang Linger (born 1982), former luger and team gold medallist at the 2006 and 2010 Winter Olympics
- Peter Penz (born 1984), an Austrian former luger and team silver and bronze medallist at the 2018 Winter Olympics
- Georg Fischler (born 1985), former luger and team silver and bronze medallist at the 2018 Winter Olympics
- Janine Flock (born 1989), pioneer skeleton racer
- Dominik Baumann (born 1992), racing driver
- David Gleirscher (born 1994), Olympic luge gold medalist at the 2018 Winter Olympics.

== Town twinning ==
Hall in Tirol is twinned with:

- Iserlohn, Germany, since 1967
- Winterthur, Switzerland
- Sommacampagna, Italy
- Brixen, Italy
- Arco, Trentino, Italy
