= Blasius Ammon =

Austrian Franciscan friar and composer

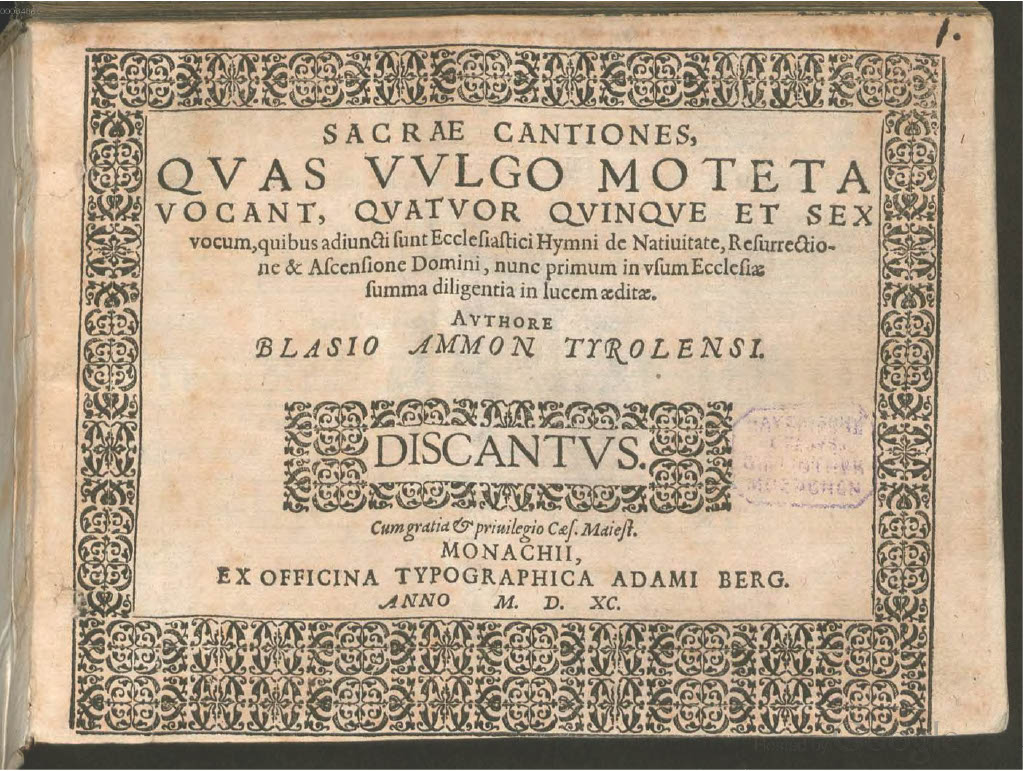
Compositions by Blasio Ammon Tyrolensi

Blasius Ammon, O.F.M., (1558 – June 1590) was an Austrian Franciscan friar and Catholic priest, who was also a composer and singer during the late Renaissance. He was born in Hall in Tirol, then in the Habsburg-ruled County of Tyrol, and died in Vienna.

In 1582 Ammon produced his first collection of compositions, Liber sacratissimarum cantionum selectissimus. He entered the Franciscan Order in 1587, in which he served a priest until his death.
