= FHWien of WKW =

University in Vienna, Austria

Coordinates: 48°13′36″N 16°20′56″E

- FHWien der WKW
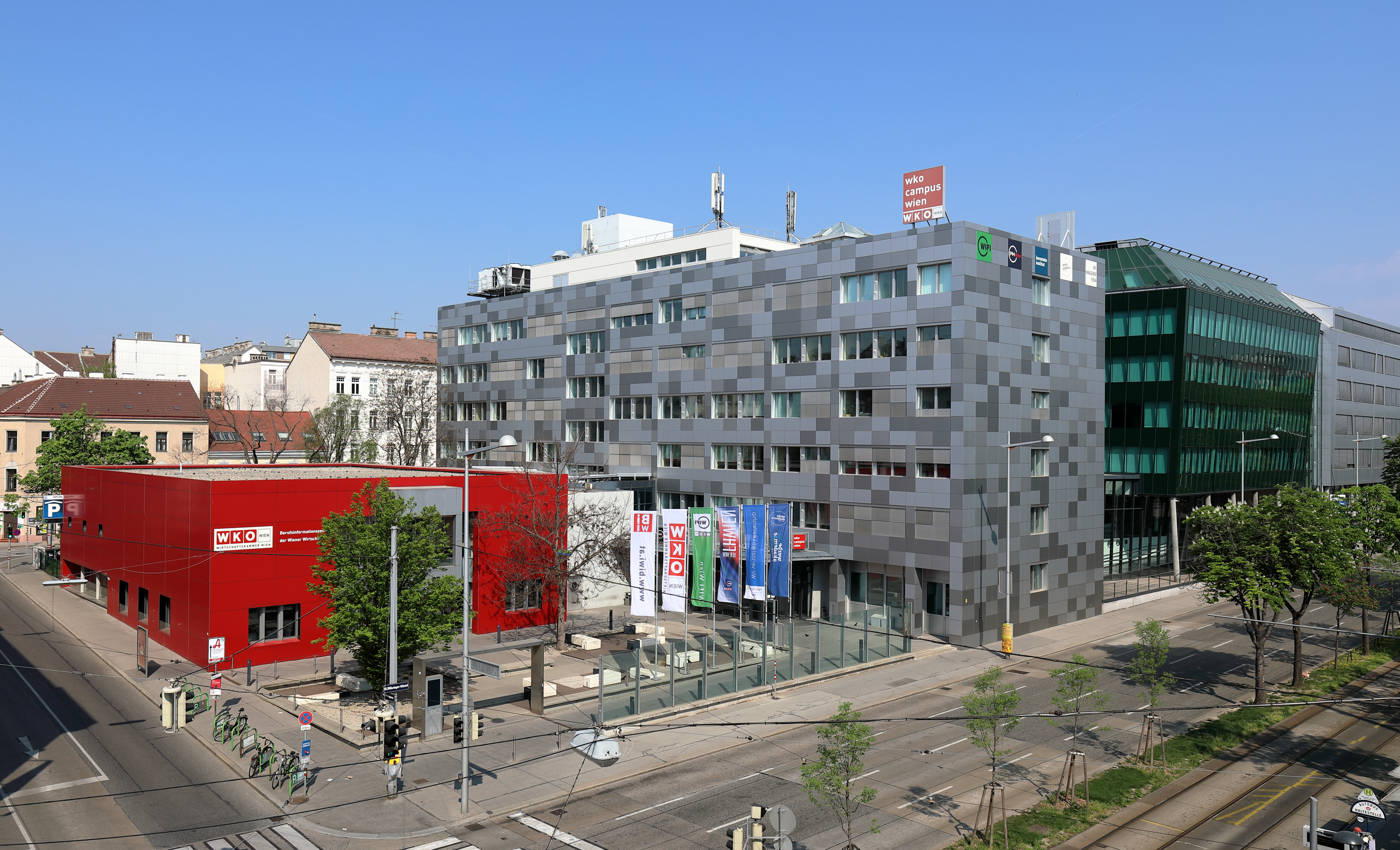
- The WKO Campus Vienna with FHWien der WKW, WIFI and others
- Motto: Die Praxis studieren (German)
- Motto in English: "Study real practice"
- Established: 1994
- Director: Carmen Hebauer
- Location: Vienna, Austria
- Website: www.fh-wien.ac.at/en/

The FHWien of WKW is a university of applied sciences for management and communication in Vienna. The Austrian Economic Chamber and the Fonds der Wiener Kaufmannschaft each share 50%. The portfolio includes bachelor's and master's as well as continuing education programmes. As of 2024, 15,946 people had completed a diploma programme or a bachelor's or master's degree programme at the university of applied sciences.

== History ==
In 2007, all fields of study (formerly: institutes) moved to the WKO campus of Vienna, Währinger Gürtel 97, 1180 Vienna.

In January 2023, the FHWien der WKW took over the Hernstein Institut für Management und Leadership.

== Study programs ==
The FHWien der WKW offers study programmes in nine areas:

- Communications Management
- Digital Economy
- Financial Management
- Human Resources & Organization
- Journalism & Media Management
- Management & Entrepreneurship
- Marketing & Sales Management
- Real Estate Management
- Tourism & Hospitality Management

The FHWien der WKW works with over 150 partner universities worldwide where students can complete semesters abroad.

== Continuing education programs ==
The FHWien der WKW also offers academic continuing education programs for employees. The continuing education programs can be divided into five topics:

- Digital Transformation
- Communication & Marketing
- Management
- Sustainability

== Notable alumni ==
- Claudia Giner, singer
