= Halltal =

- Former municipality
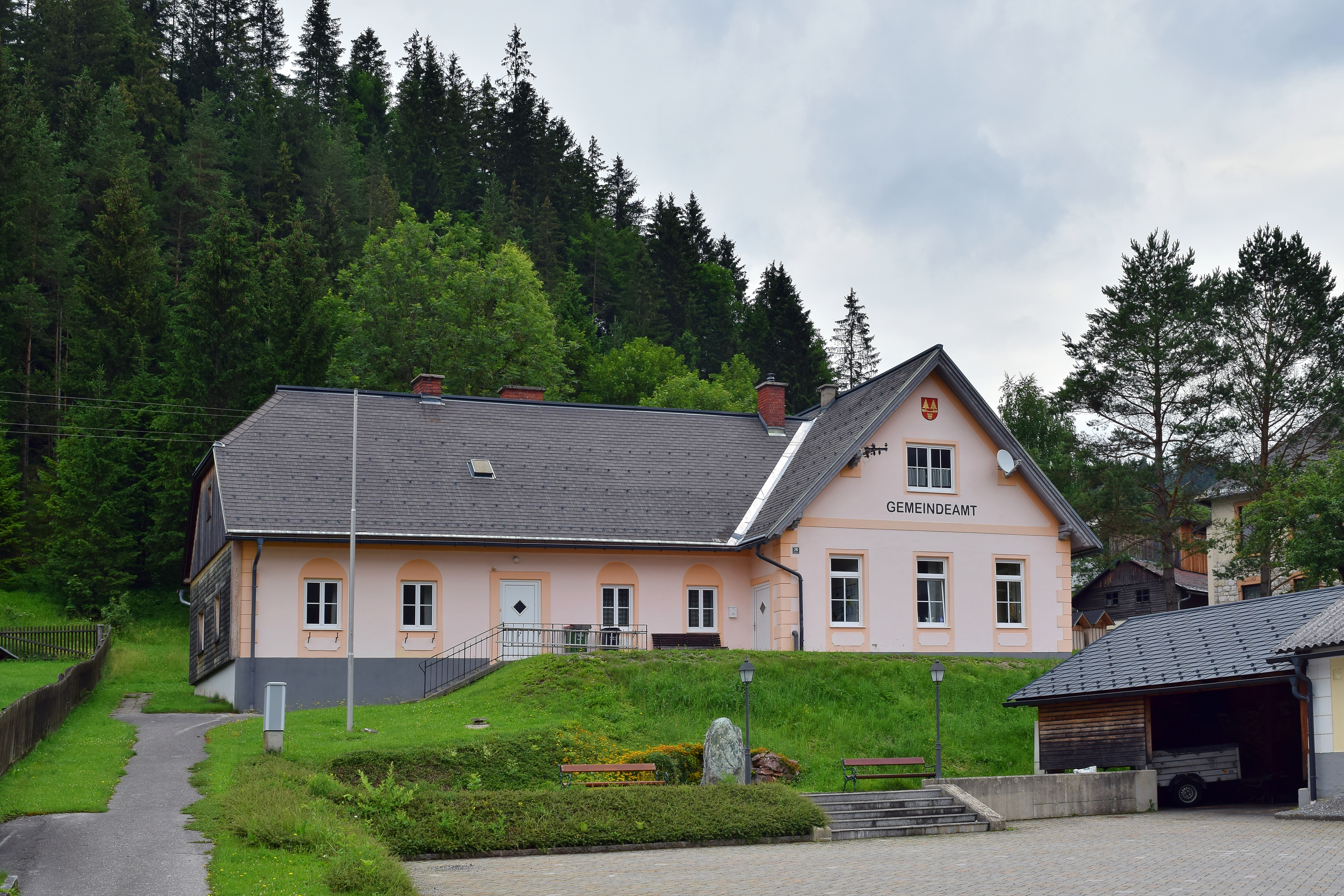

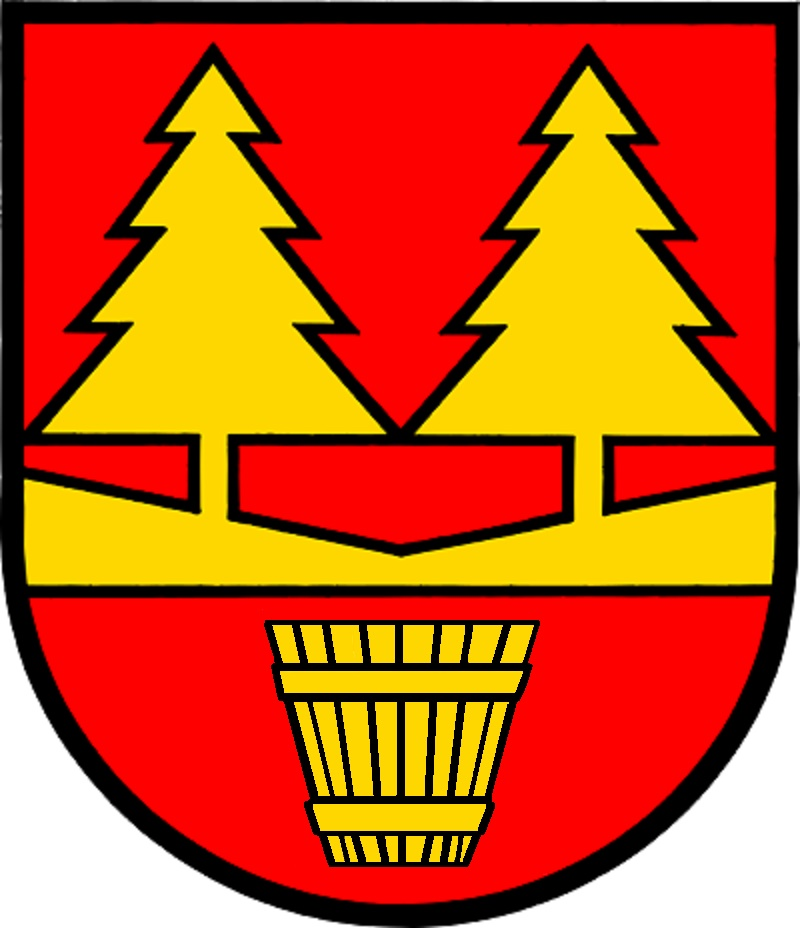
- Coat of arms

- Location within Austria
- Coordinates: 47°45′38″N 15°22′24″E
- Country: Austria
- State: Styria
- District: Bruck-Mürzzuschlag

Area
  - Total: 74.48 km^{2} (28.76 sq mi)
- Elevation: 810 m (2,660 ft)

Population (1 January 2016)
  - Total: 321
  - Density: 4.31/km^{2} (11.2/sq mi)
- Time zone: UTC+1 (CET)
  - Summer (DST): UTC+2 (CEST)
- Postal code: 8630
- Area code: 03882
- Vehicle registration: BM
- Website: www.halltal. steiermark.at

Halltal is a former municipality in the district of Bruck-Mürzzuschlag in Styria, Austria. Since the 2015 Styria municipal structural reform, it is part of the municipality Mariazell.
