= Thaur =

- Municipality
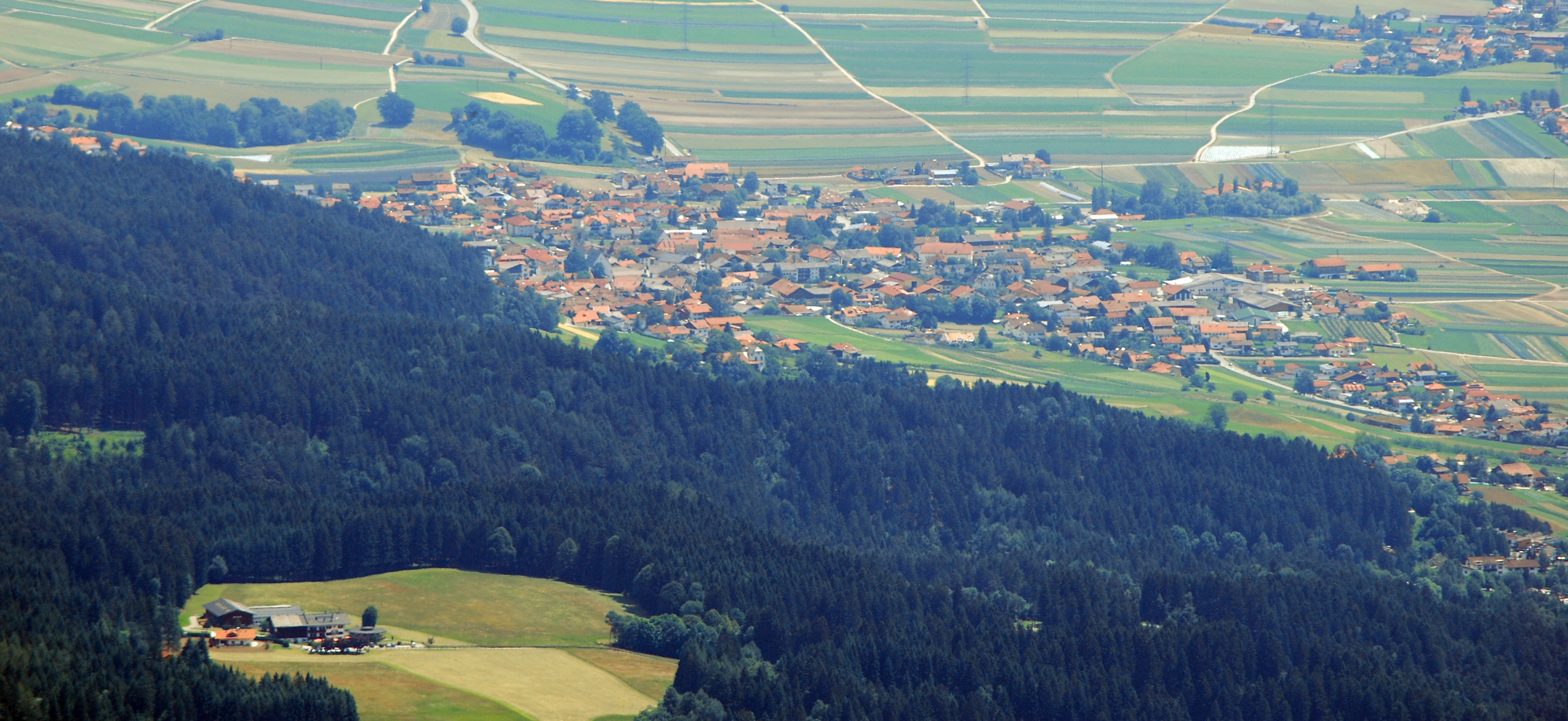

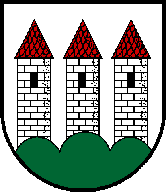
- Coat of arms

- Location within Austria
- Coordinates: 47°17′42″N 11°28′19″E
- Country: Austria
- State: Tyrol
- District: Innsbruck Land

Government
  - Mayor: Christoph Walser

Area
  - Total: 21.07 km^{2} (8.14 sq mi)
- Elevation: 633 m (2,077 ft)

Population (2018-01-01)
  - Total: 3,979
  - Density: 188.8/km^{2} (489.1/sq mi)
- Time zone: UTC+1 (CET)
  - Summer (DST): UTC+2 (CEST)
- Postal code: 6065
- Area code: 05223
- Vehicle registration: IL
- Website: www.thaur.tirol.gv.at

Thaur is a municipality in the district of Innsbruck-Land in the Austrian state of Tyrol located 5 km east of Innsbruck between Rum, Austria and Hall in Tirol.

Settlement of the area probably began around 1000 BC but the location was mentioned as “Taurane” for the first time in 827 when the Innichen Abbey acquired land. Thaur is very religious even nowadays.

== Population ==
Historical population
Year	Pop.	±%
1869	1,120	—
1880	1,062	−5.2%
1890	1,092	+2.8%
1900	1,162	+6.4%
1910	1,199	+3.2%
1923	1,206	+0.6%
1934	1,379	+14.3%
1939	1,449	+5.1%
1951	1,807	+24.7%
1961	1,867	+3.3%
1971	2,409	+29.0%
1981	2,774	+15.2%
1991	3,230	+16.4%
2001	3,483	+7.8%
2011	3,760	+8.0%
