= Heimatstil =

Architectural style

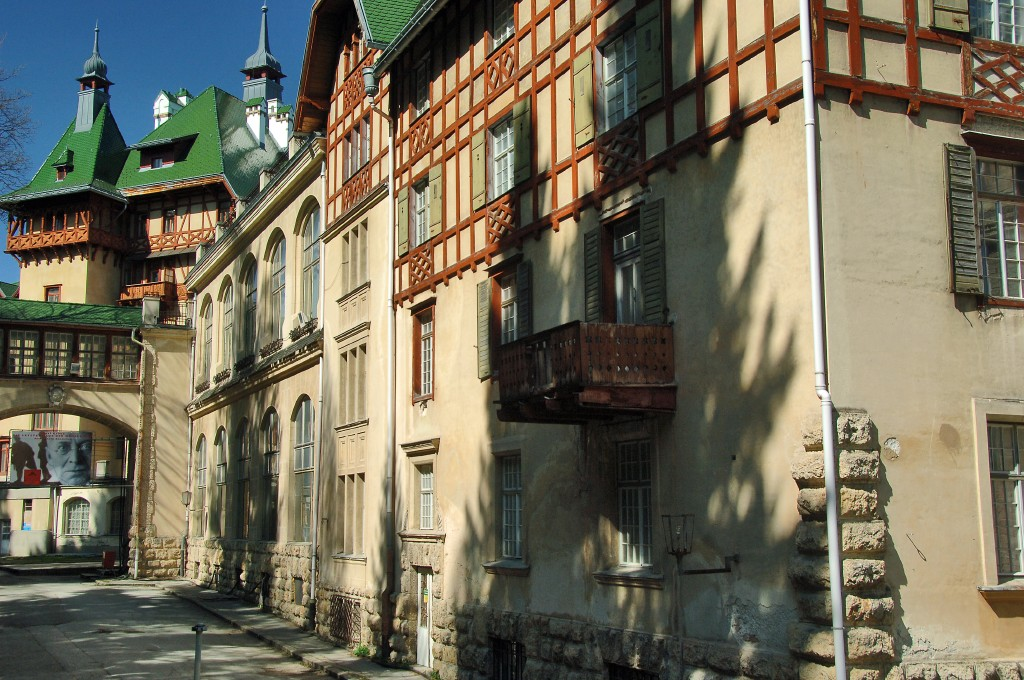
The Südbahnhotel, a palace built in 1882 on the Semmering hill in Austria

The Heimatstil is an architectural style of the second half of the nineteenth century and the first half of the twentieth referring to the historicist tendencies which one encounters in the German-speaking countries, including Switzerland (the architecture of chalets), but also in Victorian England and even in the north and eastern parts of France, as well as Belgium and Flanders. The Heimatstil is characterized by the use of wood on the façade and sculpted beams, connected by protruding or rusticated stone, recalling the illustrations from literature and folklore, especially Germanic ones, from the time period.

The Heimatstil should not be confused with the closely related Neo-Germanic modern style (Heimatschutzarchitektur), a kind of modern historicism that emerged about 1905.

== Variant Names ==
=== In German-speaking Countries ===
Synonyms in these regions include Tyrolean architecture, modern half-timbered architecture ("Fachwerk") or scroll saw ("Laubsäge"), etc. Its variation inspired by Alpine architecture is called the "Swiss chalet style" (Schweizerstil).

=== In Anglophone Countries ===
One often uses the terms "Victorian Style" although this term is really too vast to be accurate, or, more precisely (especially in North America) the Carpenter or Shingle and Stick Style.

== History ==
Contrary to popular belief, the origins of this style can be found first in the idealized past of Romanticism, with the vogue for landscaped parks, rather than in the Swiss or Tyrolean Alps. In fact, buildings, factories or neo-Gothic ruins were sometimes built there. The Germanic version, with towers, turrets, corner cut stones, balconies and wooden loggias, was immediately in vogue in the aristocratic society of the time, which chose it for its castles and hunting lodges and this style associates first of all with the attraction of nature, in particular the forests and the mountains of Central Europe.

the point of origin for the style can be traced to the 1873 Vienna World's Fair, where all the alpine styles of architecture were represented. Many pavilions were constructed in this style with decorative and structural fretwork.

== Spread and Flourishing ==
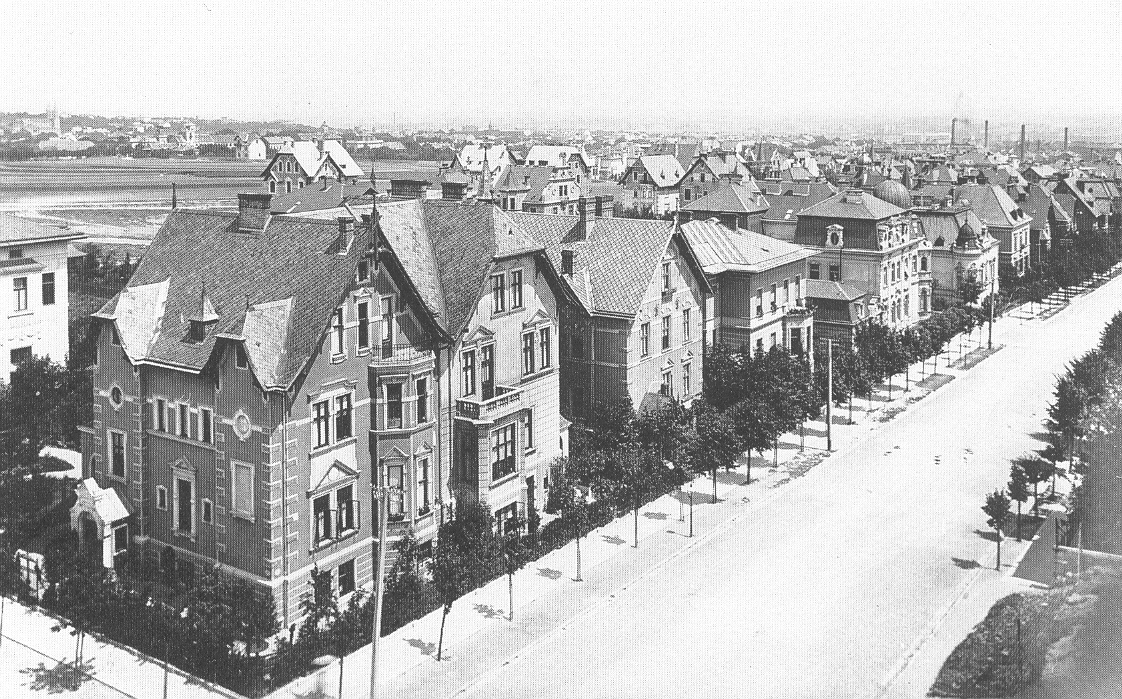
A district full of cottages in Vienna on the Hasenauerstraße in 1910

The fashion for summer resorts in cooler regions (unlike today) took hold in the nineteenth century in the aristocracy and then in the bourgeoisie. With the onset of tourism and the culture of summer vacation, the new style quickly spread. This resulted in a colorful mixture of individual architectural features typical of the landscape, the buildings were, so to speak, adapted to the respective location and decorated accordingly with half-timbering, humpback blocks, carved elements or shutters. The architecture of the villas is similar to that of the countryside and farms and rural castles are idealized by using wood, decorating the buildings with oriel windows, watchtowers, etc.

The cottage movement imported from England set itself the goal of increasing the quality of living by pairing urban infrastructure with rural architecture - entire villa districts were created in the local style, such as the cottage district of the Cottage Association founded in Vienna (Wiener Cottage Verein) in 1872. The arrival of Jugendstil (German Art Nouveau) marks the end of the development of this style rooted in a landscape and an idealized land, for a style now using symbols.

Since the petty bourgeois class quickly found liking for the style, at the turn of the century, based on the example of the large villas, more and more single-family houses in the local style were built. Style elements such as fretwork, humpback blocks, exposed stone elements or half-timbering were adopted one-to-one on the smaller building structures. Details such as turrets, a blended roof landscape or the symmetries were also implemented on a smaller scale. Side wings, for example, were reduced to side risalite, and turrets became wooden ridge turrets. Far away from big names in architecture, gems of respectable architectural quality were created in the urban fringes.

At the same time, several leading architects such as Heinrich von Ferstel, brought the new design back to the country. Villas and hotels were built in the health resorts of the Austro-Hungarian monarchy and along the railways. The villas in Reichenau an der Rax should be mentioned here, such as the Villa Hebra or the Villa Wartholz, the villa colony on Semmering, or the railway hotels of the Südbahngesellschaft, above all the Südbahnhotel on Semmering.

Analogous to these large and luxurious hotel buildings, the spa facilities in Austria were also often built in the local style around 1900. This form of design should be reminiscent of the comforts of a palace hotel and thus take away the medical horror of the sanatorium. The famous Austrian lung sanatoriums in the eastern foothills of the Alps, such as the Henriette Weiss sanatorium, the Hochegg sanatorium or the Wienerwald sanatorium, were all built in the Heimatstil. A good example of buildings of the Heimatstil outside the Danube Monarchy, e.g. Switzerland, for example, was the Basel sanatorium built in Davos in 1895–96. The main building of the Bilz sanatorium there, built in Saxony in 1895 and called Schloss Lössnitz, was comparable to this.

== Gallery ==
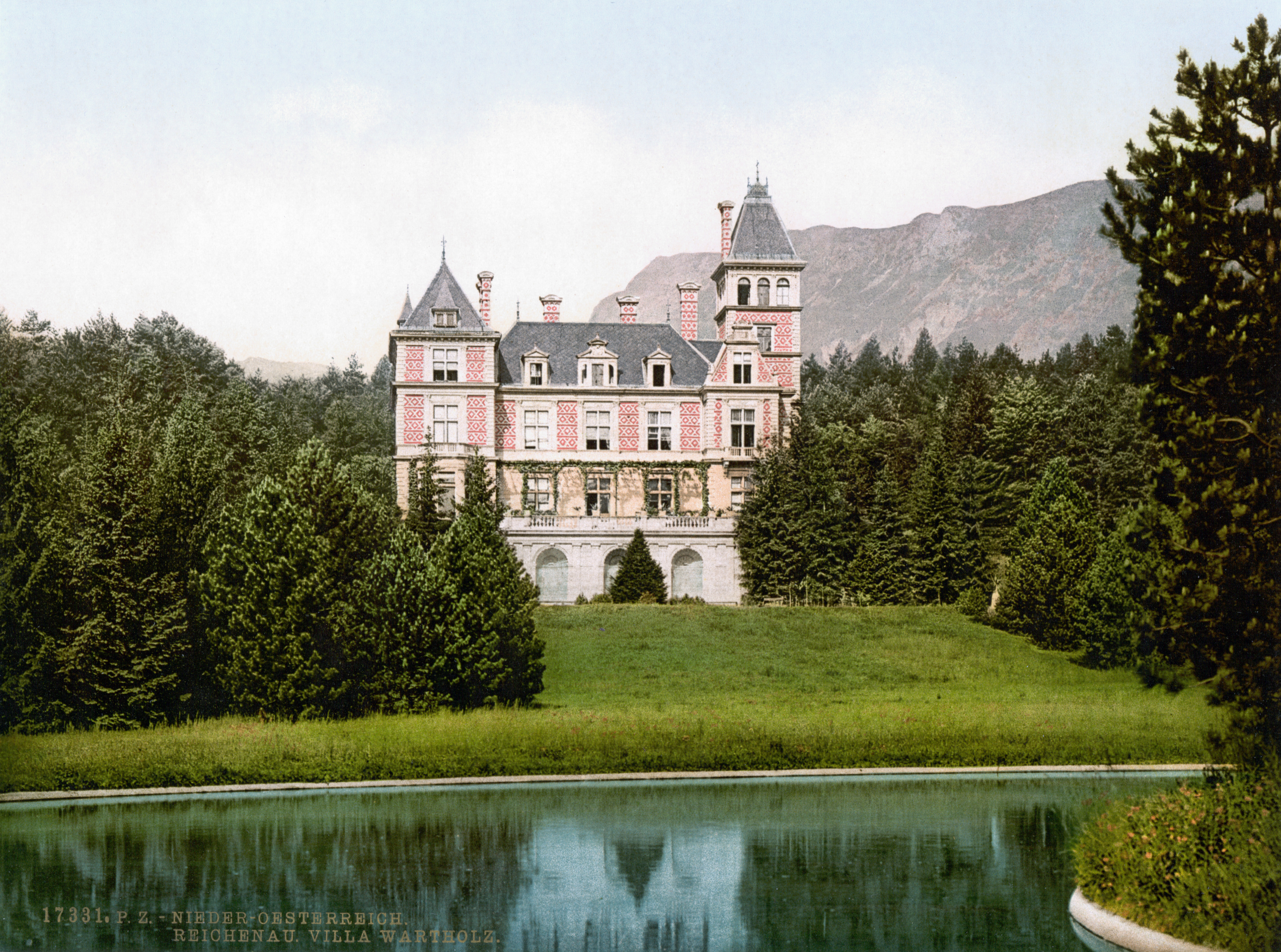
Villa Wartholz in Reichenau, Austria (1870/72) built by Heinrich von Ferstel

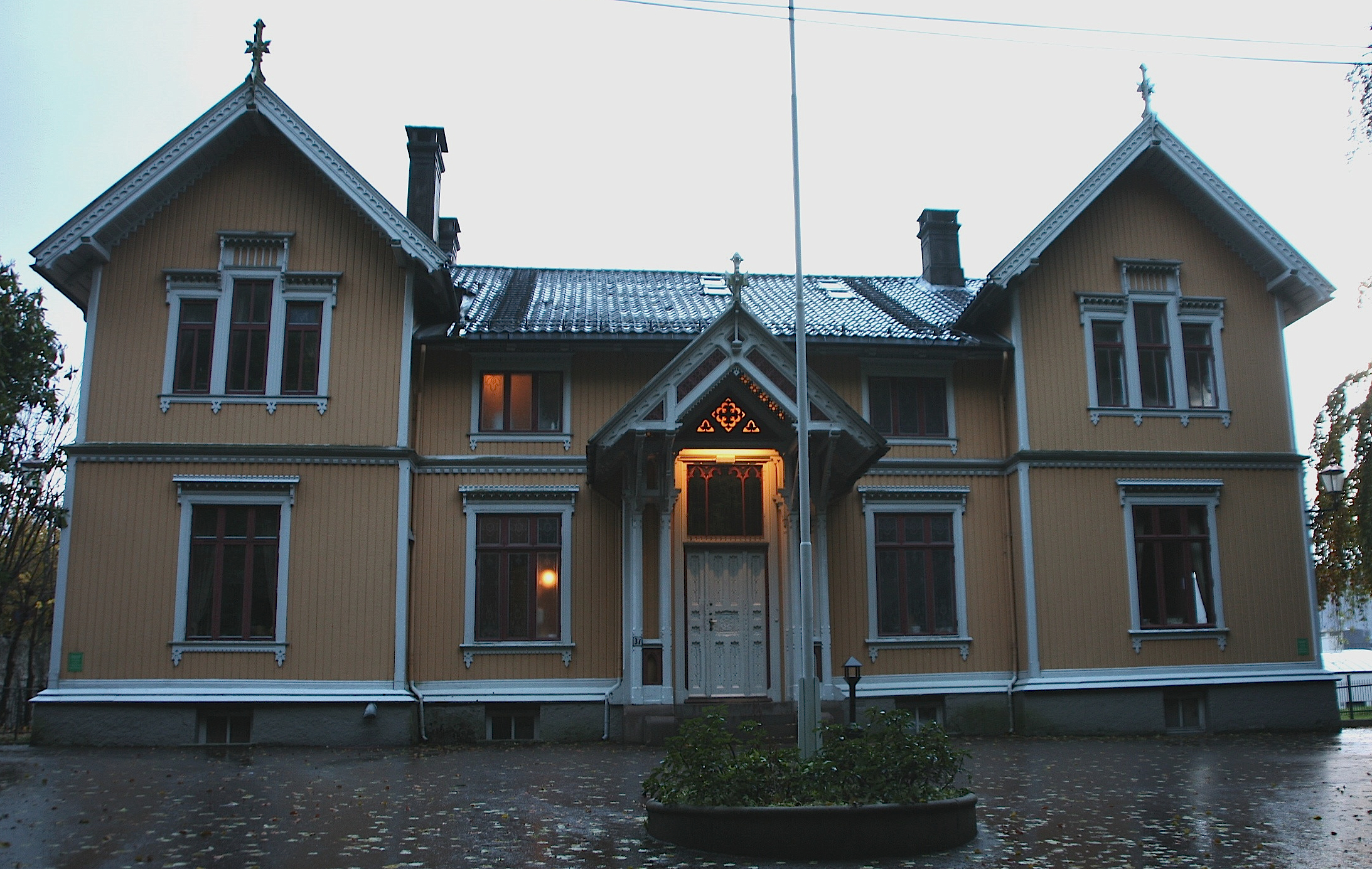
Villa Kalfaret in Bergen, Norway (1873) by Peter Andreas Blix

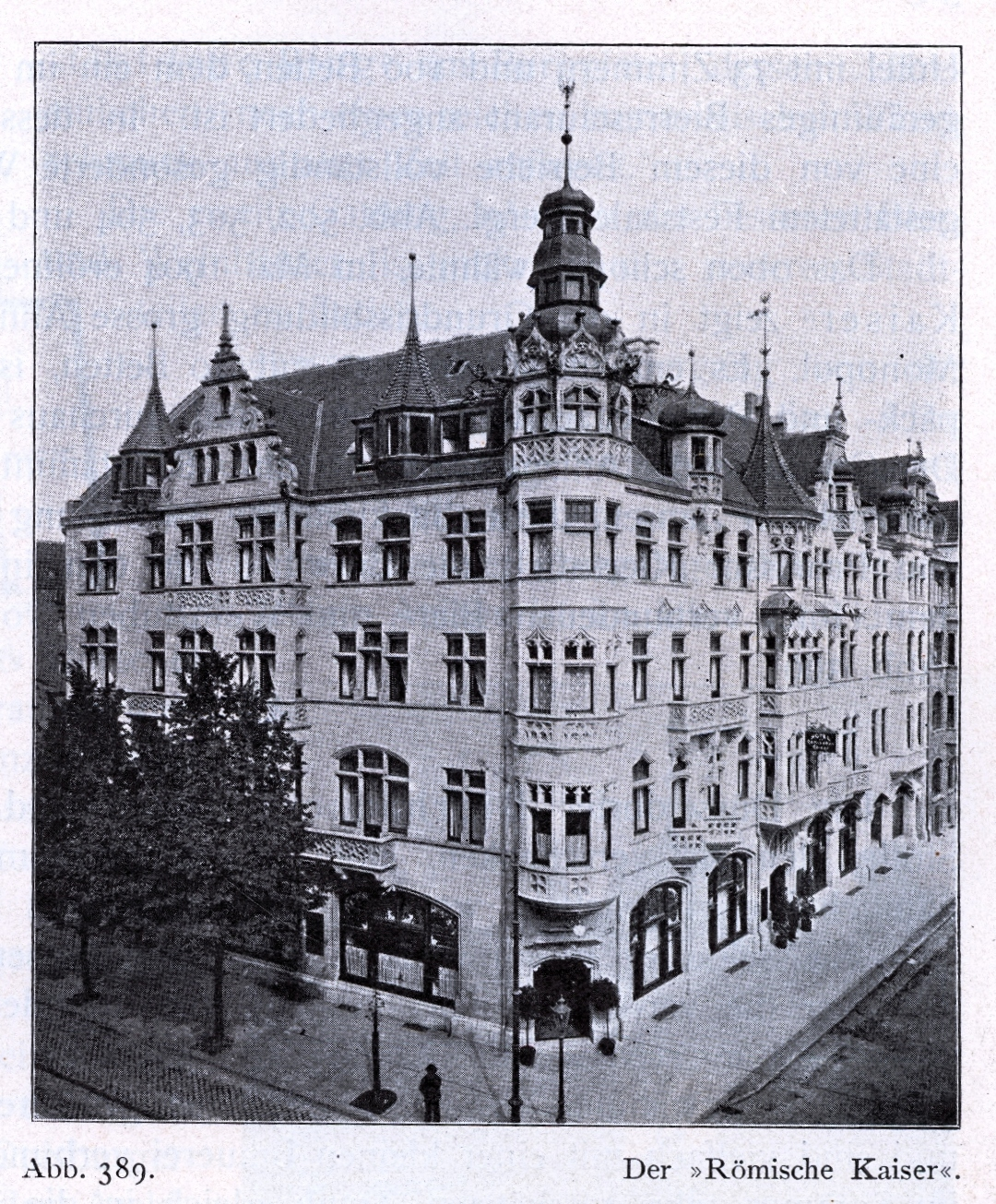
Hotel Römischer Kaiser in Düsseldorf (1903) by Josef Kleesattel

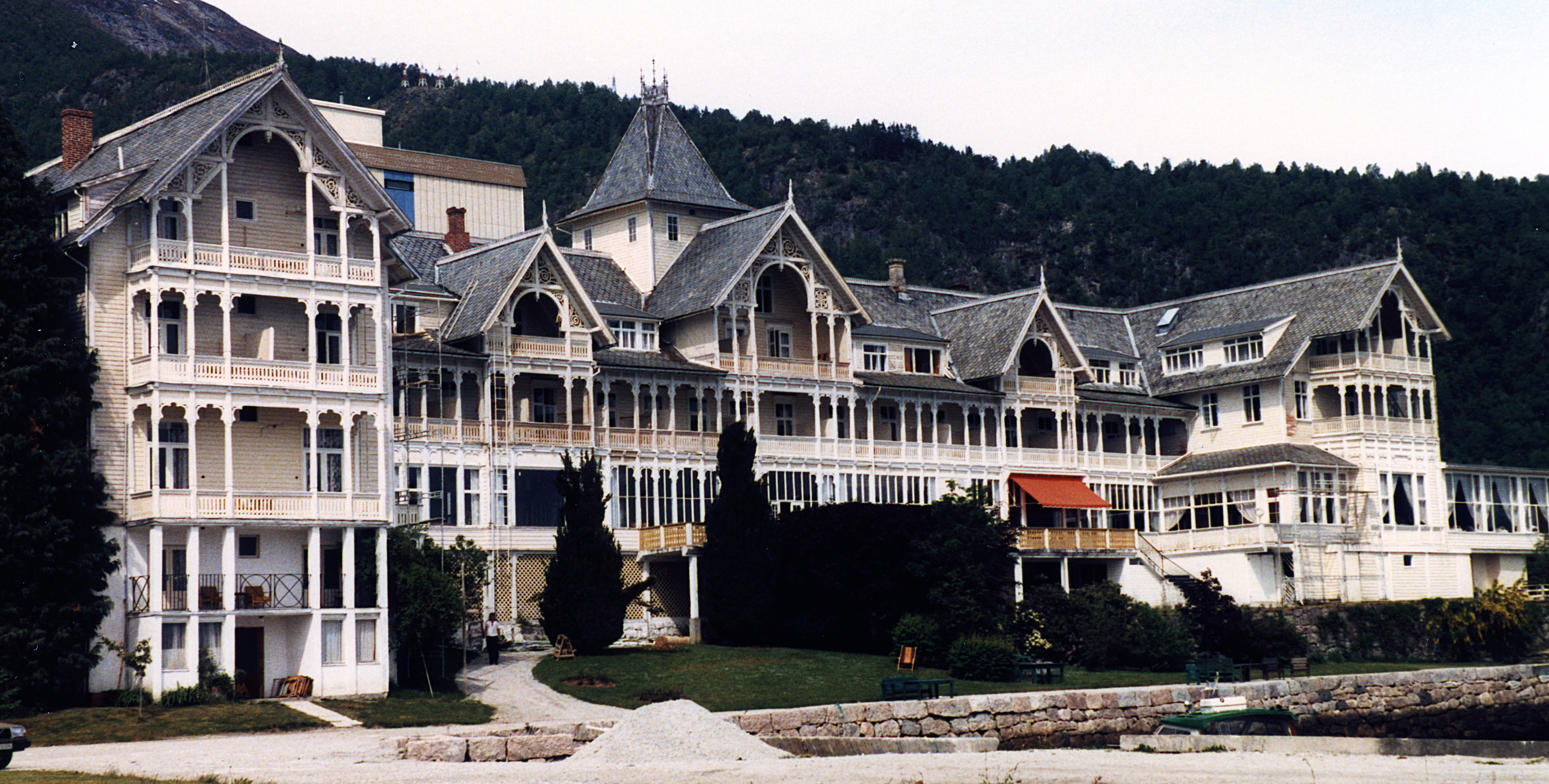
Hotel Kvikne in Balestrand, Norway (1913), Heimatstil in a chalet context

== Examples ==
- Villa Wartholz in Reichenau
- de:Sanatorium Wienerwald in de:Feichtenbach, built in 1903–04
