= Höllentalbahn =

Höllentalbahn may refer to:

- Höllentalbahn (Black Forest), a railway from Freiburg im Breisgau to Donaueschingen through the Black Forest in Baden-Württemberg, Germany
- Höllentalbahn (Bavaria), a railway from Marxgrün, Bavaria to Blankenstein, Thuringia in Germany
- Höllentalbahn (Lower Austria), a railway from Payerbach-Reichenau to the beginning of the Hölle Valley in Lower Austria, Austria
