= Hotel Römischer Kaiser =

Office building and former hotel in Düsseldorf

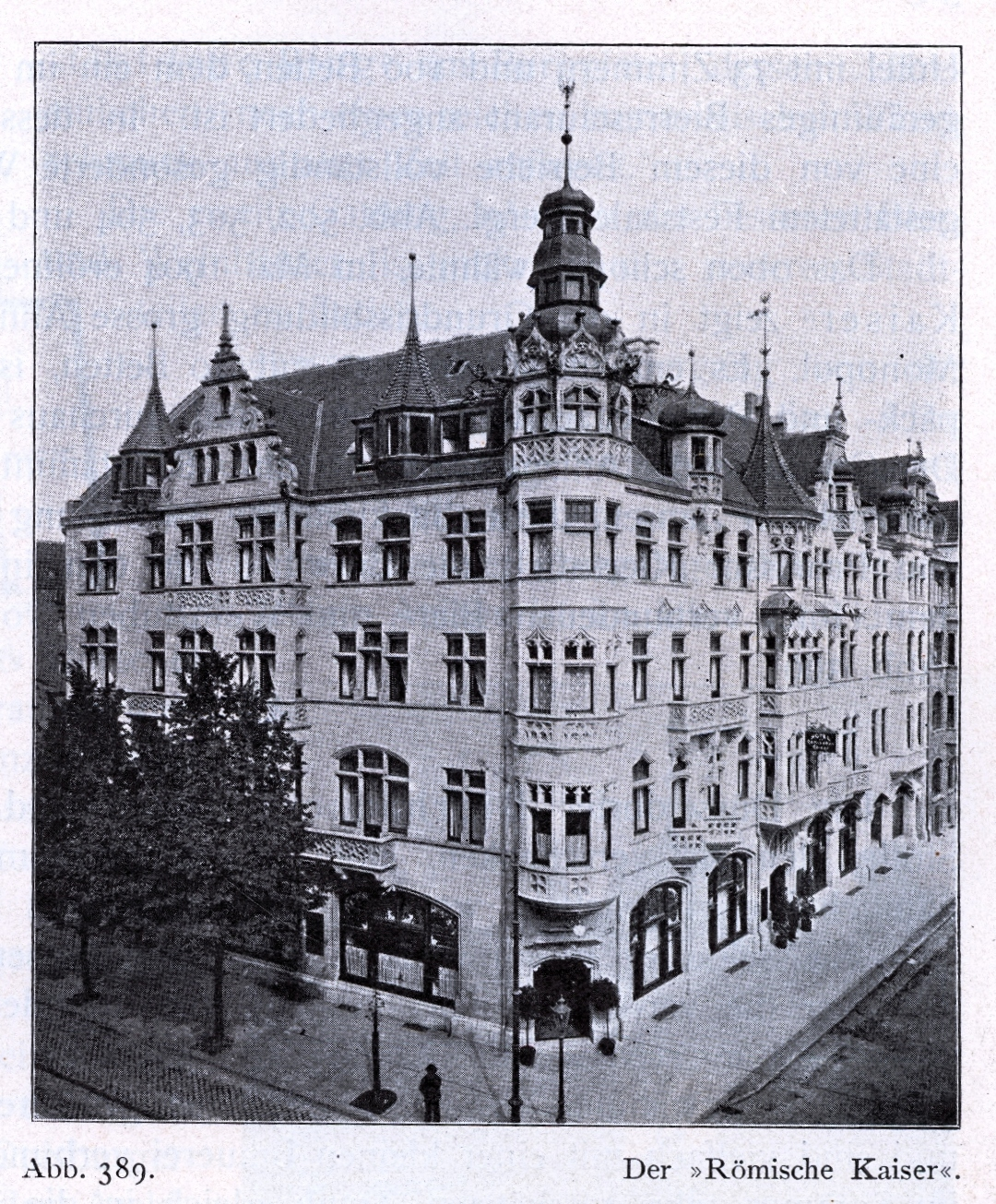
- Interactive map of the Hotel Römischer Kaiser area

General information
- Type: offices, commercial, former hotel
- Architectural style: Heimatstil
- Location: Stresemanstraße 26, Düsseldorf, North Rhine-Westphalia, Germany
- Coordinates: 51°13′09″N 6°47′7″E
- Completed: 1904

Design and construction
- Architect: Josef Kleesattel

The Hotel Römischer Kaiser (English: Roman Emperor Hotel) is a former hotel at Stresemanstraße 26 in the center of Düsseldorf, North Rhine-Westphalia, Germany, which has more recently been used as an office and commercial building. It was designed by Josef Kleesattel and finished in 1904.

== History ==
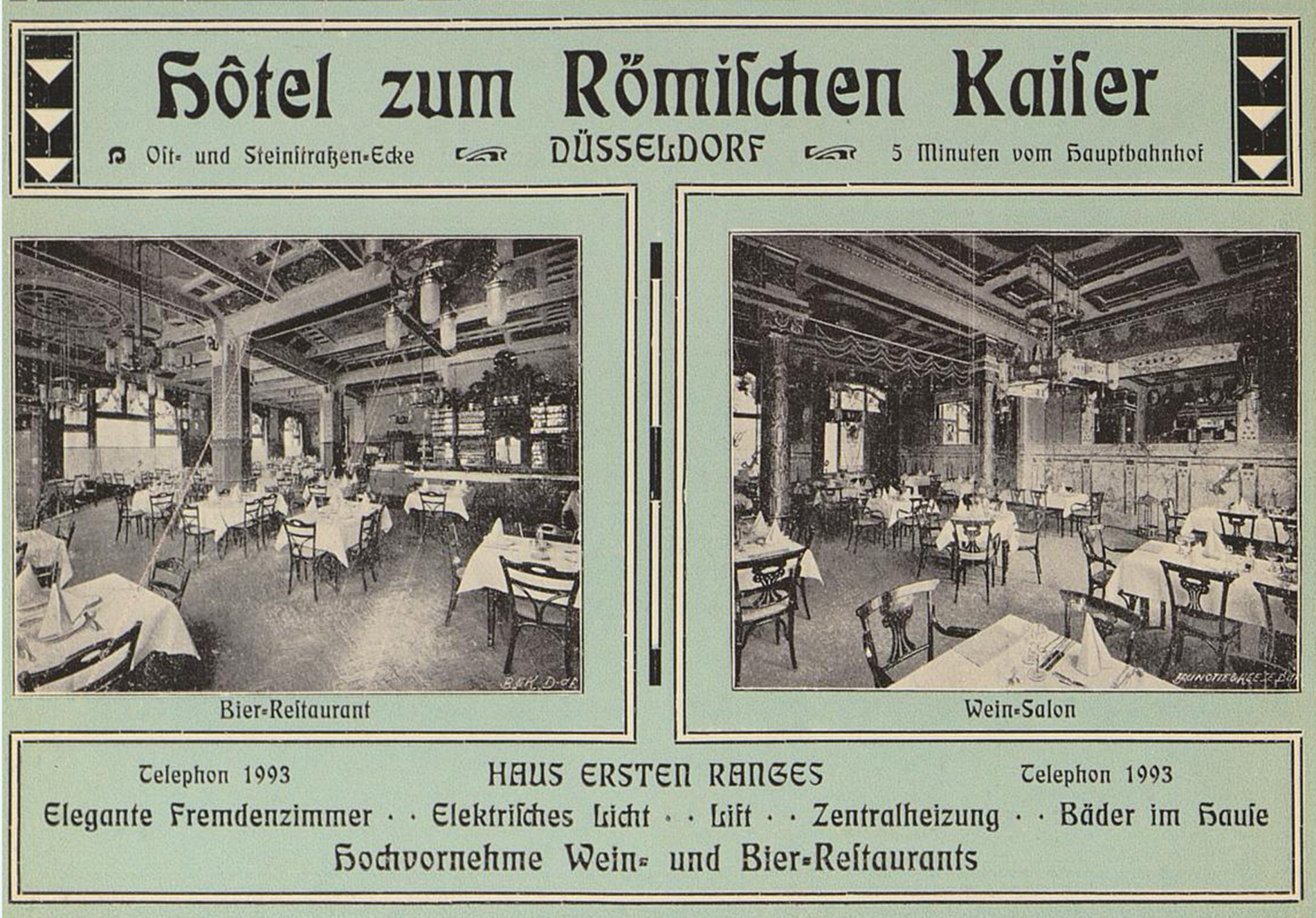
Jugendstil advertisement for the wine and beer bars at the Hotel Römischer Kaiser, 1905.

The previous building of the hotel was at Benrather Straße 3. From 1903 to 1904 Josef Kleesattel built the four-story corner structure with stone facades at the corner of Steinstraße 70 (today Stresemannstraße 26). The building contractor was FW Zensen. Hermann vom Endt designed the beer and wine bars that were connected to the hotel. Its location was touted on advertisements as being only five minutes away from Düsseldorf's main train station, and was equipped with all the modern conveniences of the time, including electric lights, an elevator, and central heating. The Düsseldorf Yacht Club was founded on the hotel's premises in 1908.

Jörg Heimeshoff has described the Gothic Revival details as:

The facades of the building erected as the Römischer Kaiser hotel show decorative elements from the late Gothic period. Tracery structures on parapets, balconies and windows, curtain arches and stone cross windows indicate this. Several bay windows, balconies, gables and turrets create a picturesque appearance. Wide, segment-arched openings divide the ground floor.

However, one might argue that the combination of Gothic-revival elements with bulbous domes capping the corner tower and the gables with volutes point more to a Heimatstil (Homeland style) popular in German architecture around 1900.

The building was damaged during World War II and rebuilt in a simplified manner in the 1950s. The gables and turret were reconstructed in 1982-83 largely based on the original drawings, though the small dormers in between these features were left as skylights. It is currently used as a bank office on the ground floor (since 2015), with offices on the upper floors.

== Gallery ==
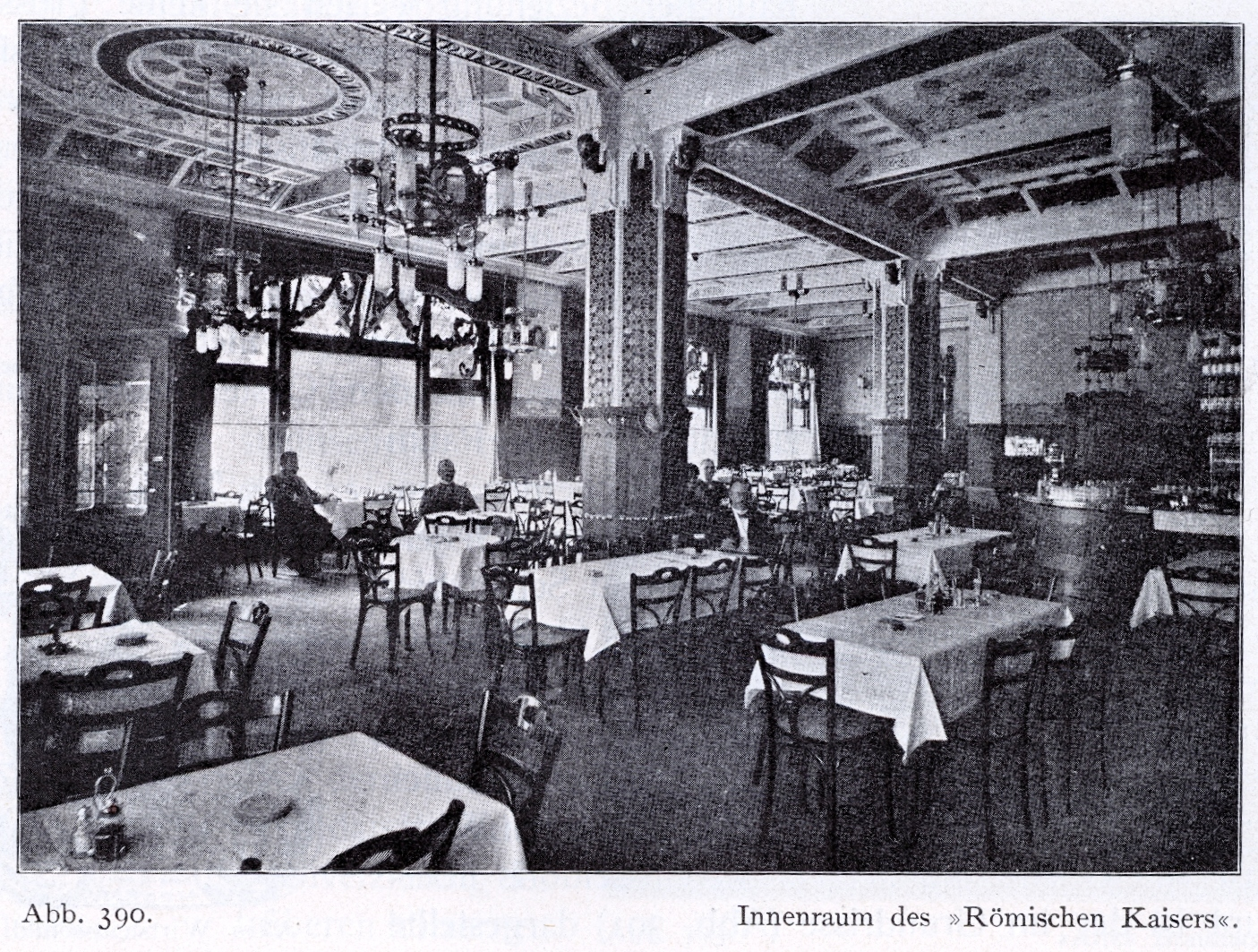
Dining Room, ca. 1904

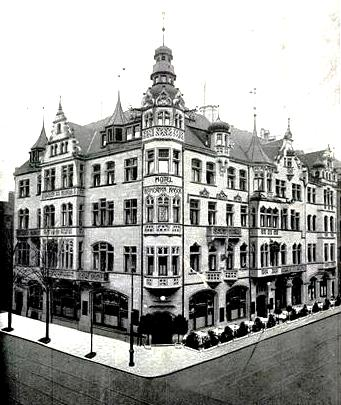
Photograph of the façade, ca. 1904

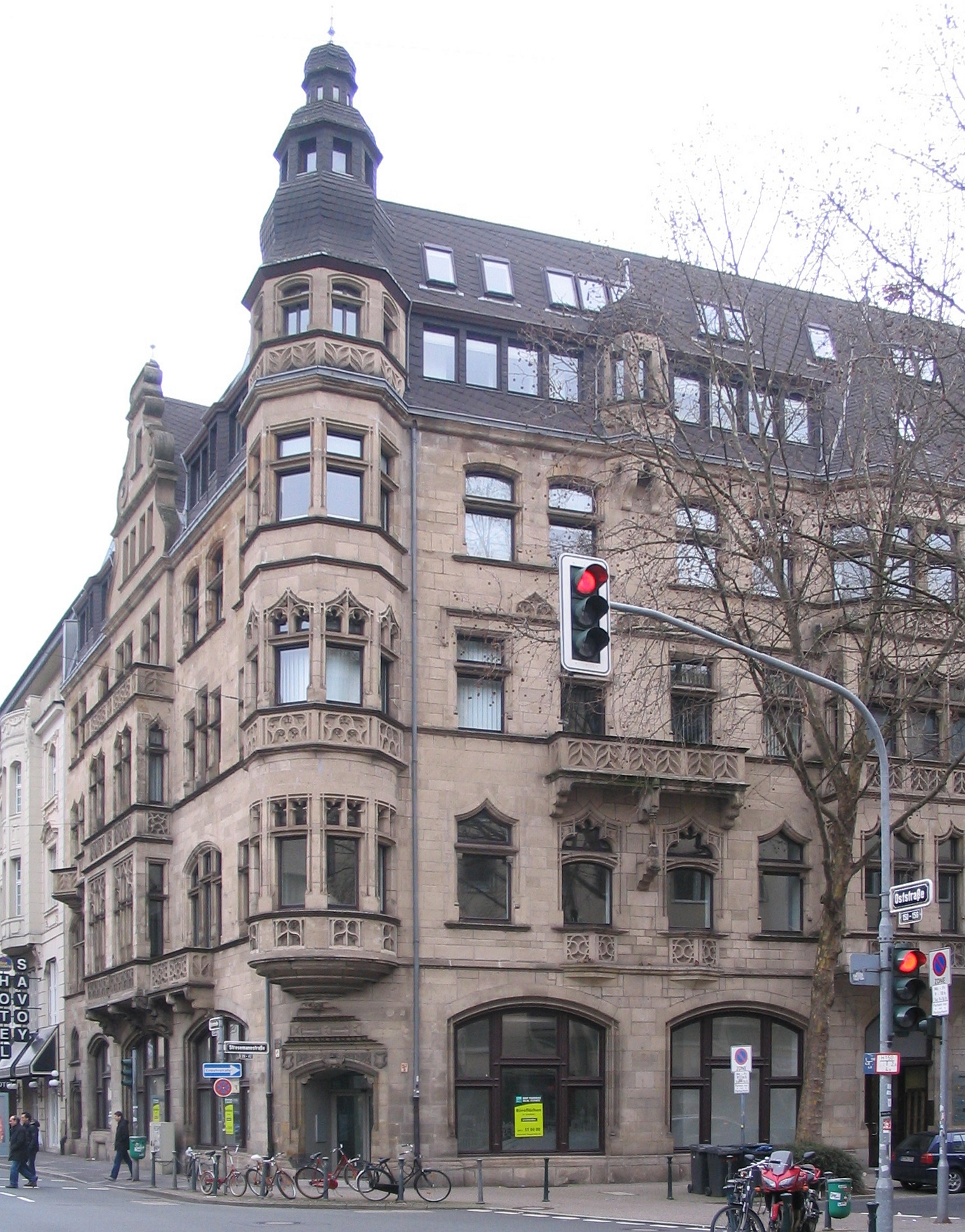
Detail of corner tower, 2012

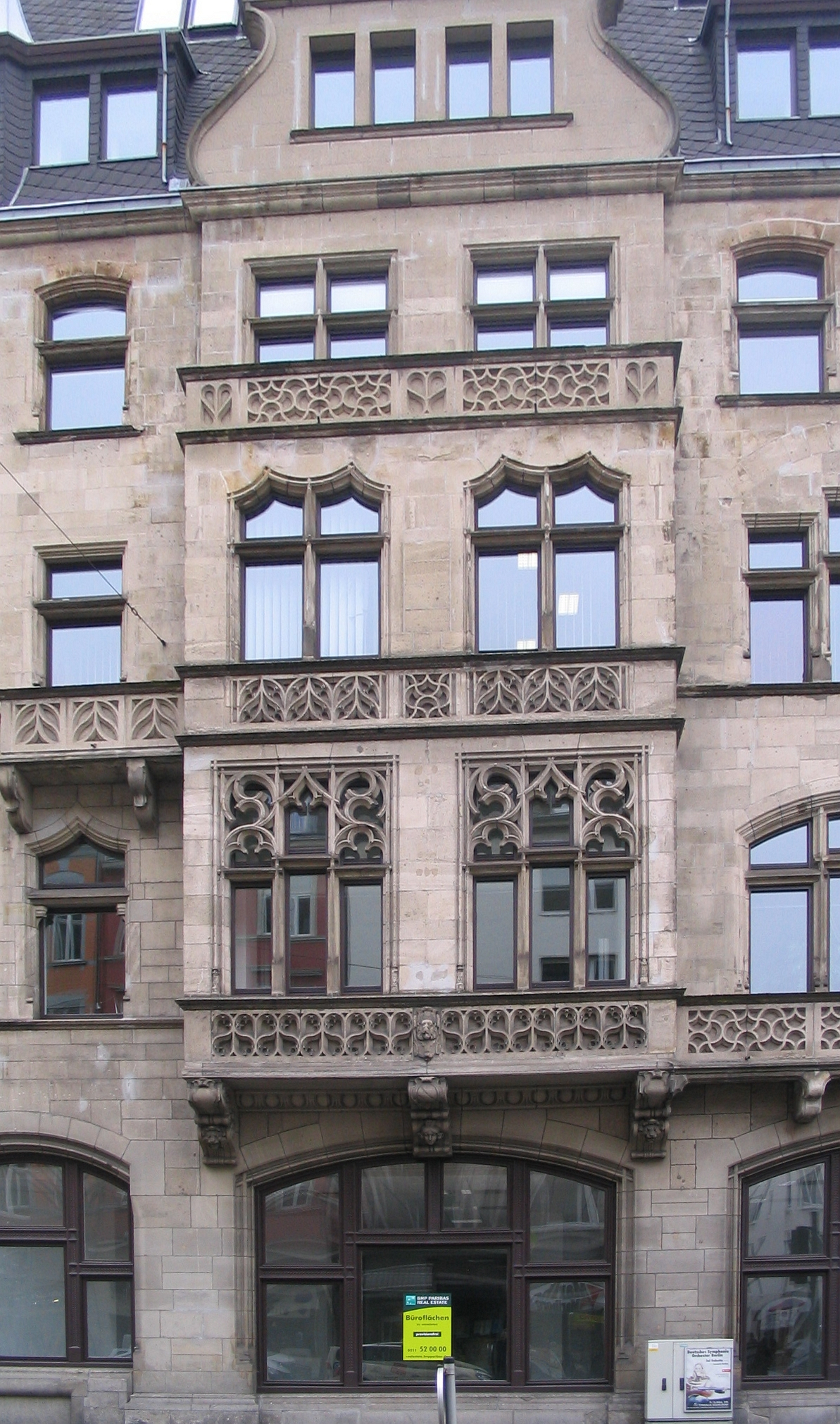
Detail of oriel bay, 2012

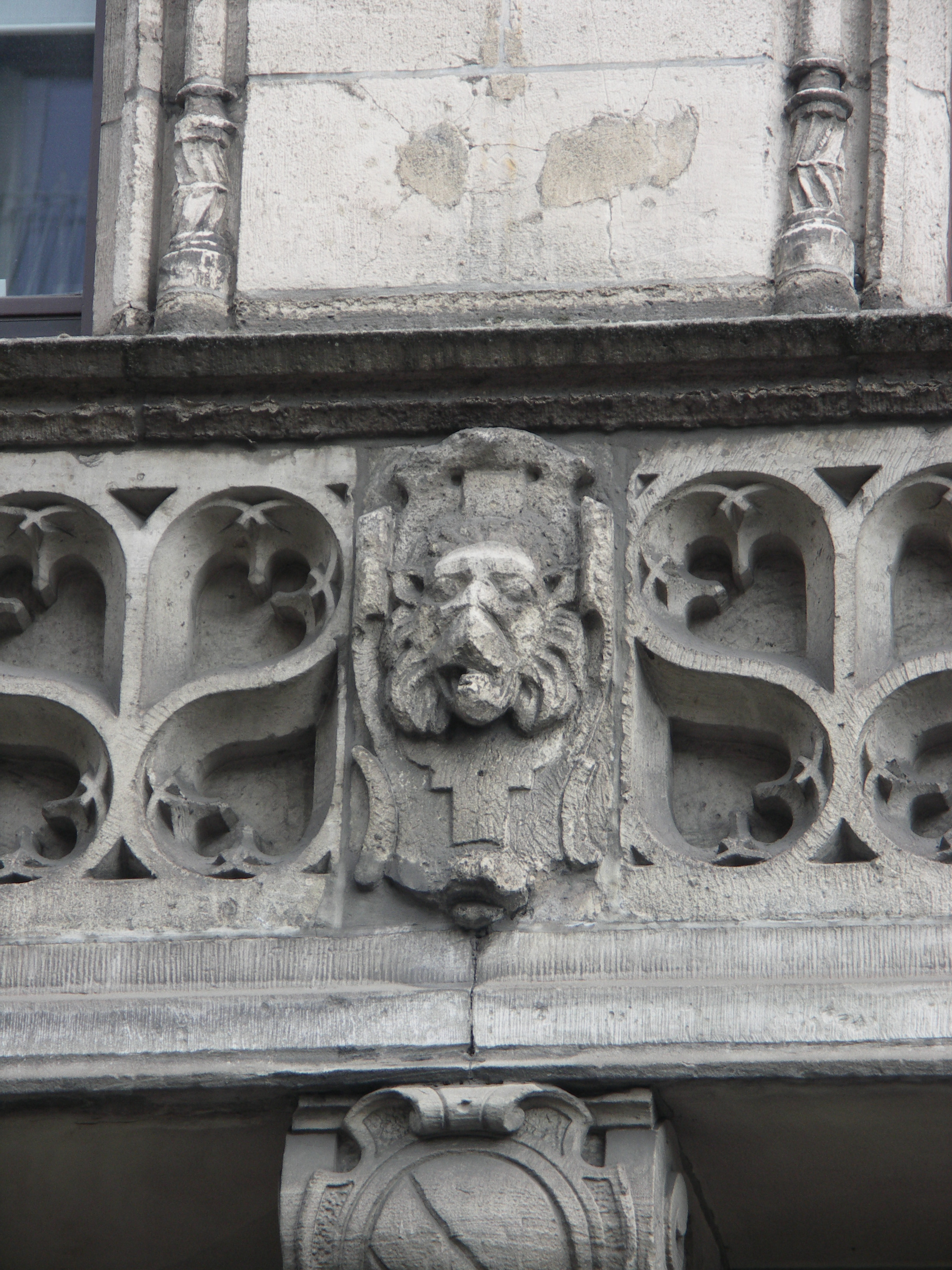
Sculptural detail on façade

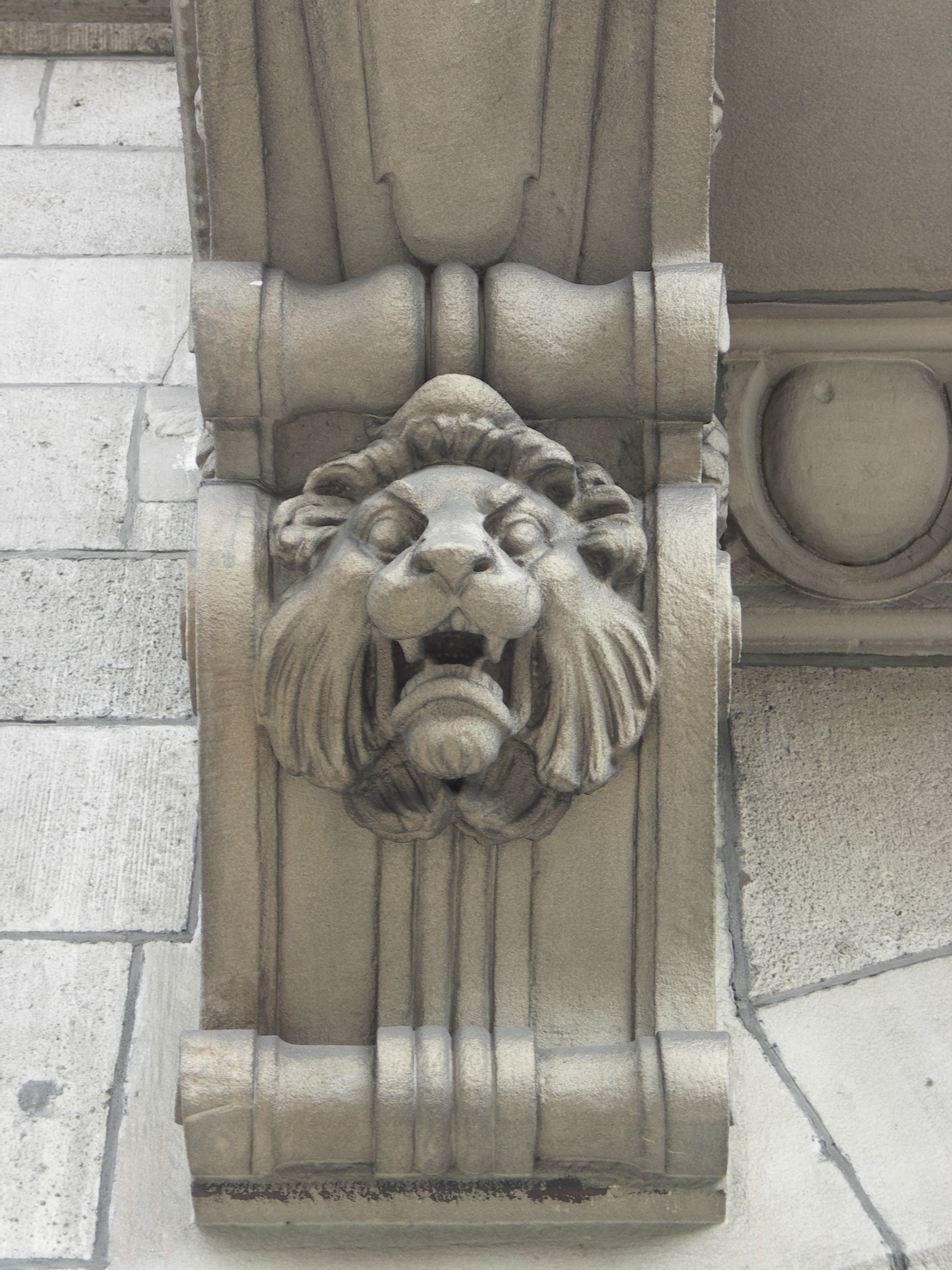
Sculptural detail on façade

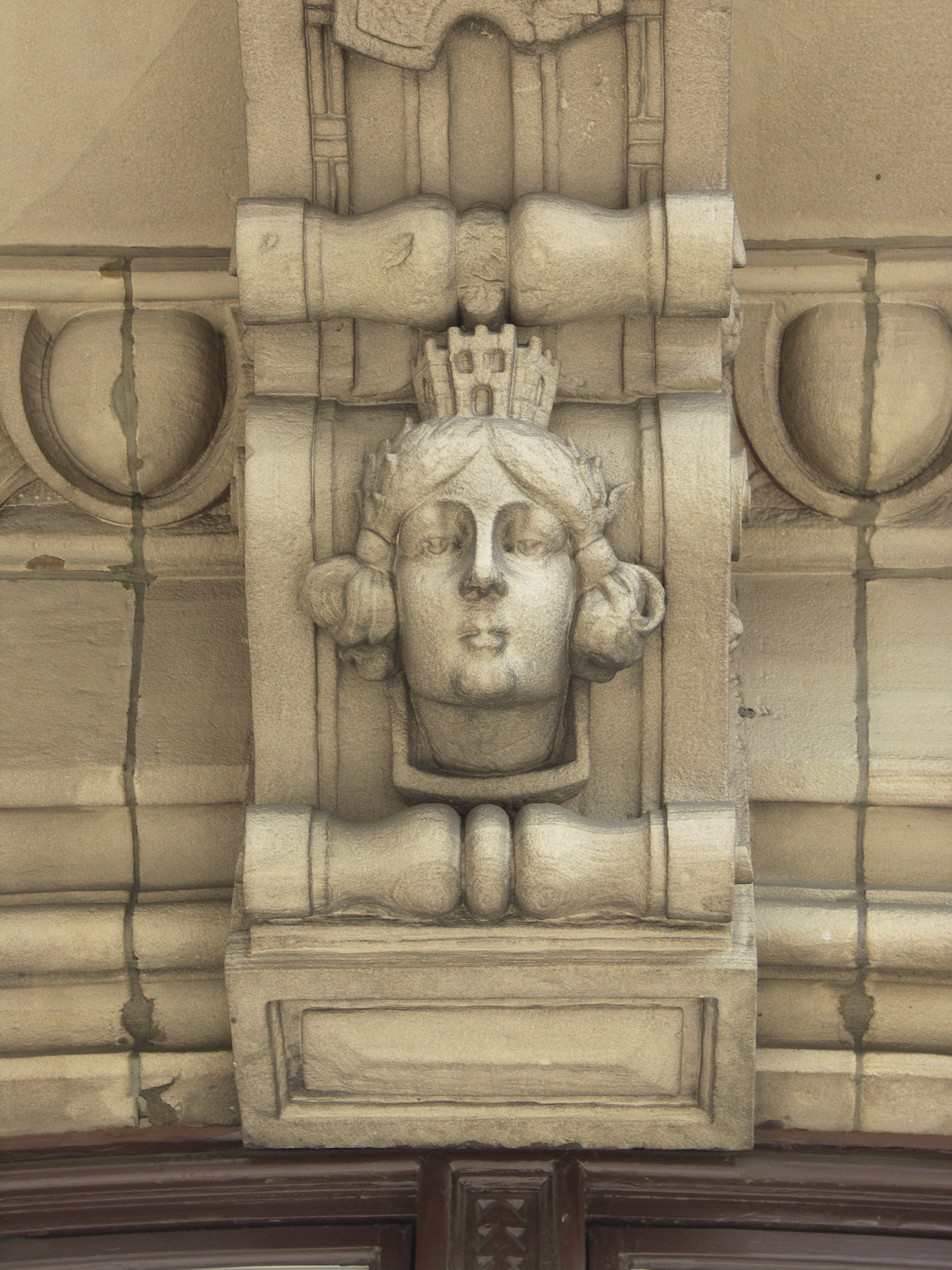
Sculptural detail on façade
