= Höllental Railway (Lower Austria) =

Preserved railway in lower Austria

Coordinates: 47°41′47″N 15°50′56″E

Höllentalbahn (Niederösterreich)
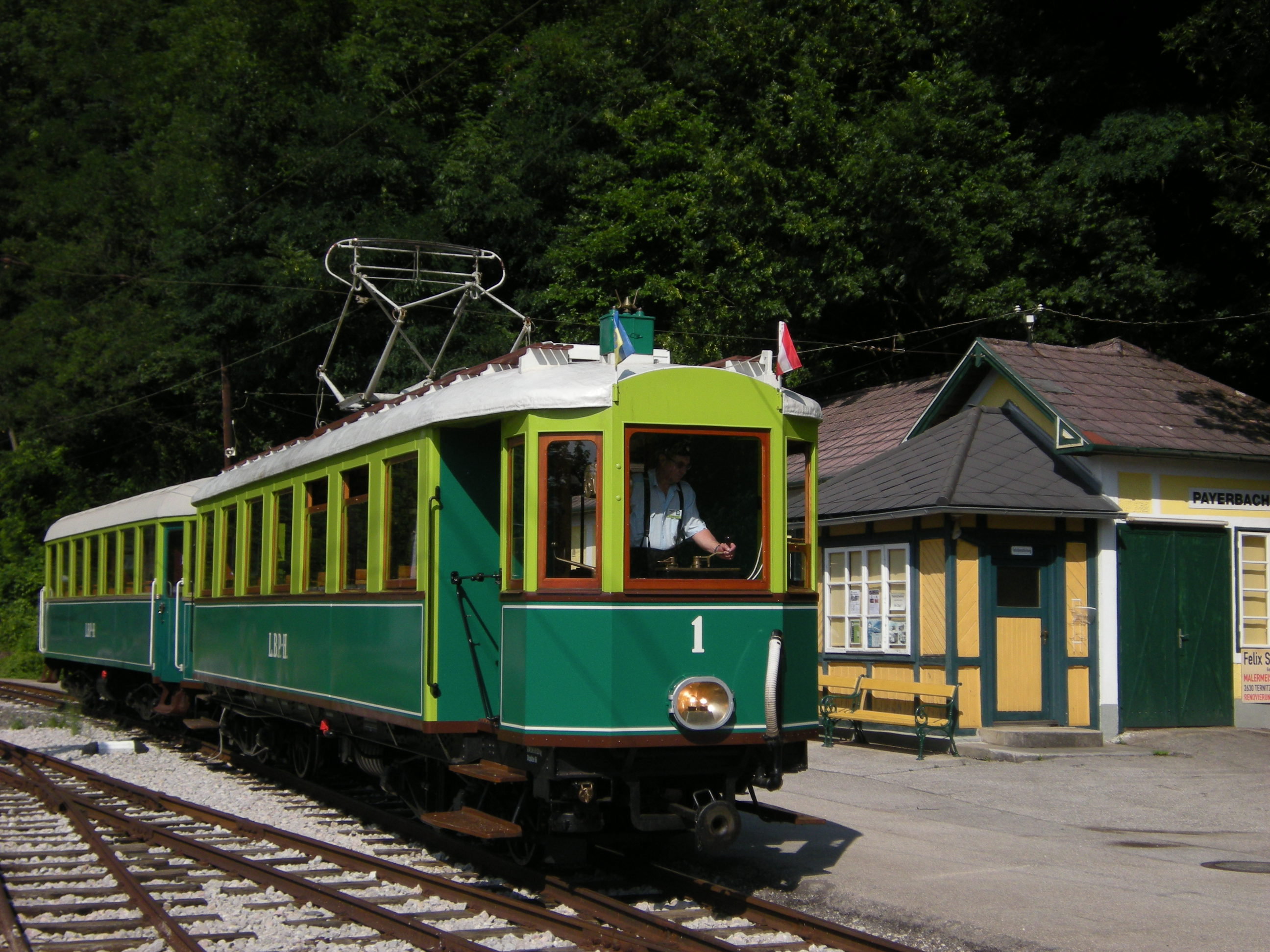

Overview
- Owner: Payerbach Hirschwang GmbH

Service
- Operator(s): Austrian Society for Local Railways (ÖGLB)

Technical
- Line length: 5 km (3.1 mi)
- Number of tracks: Single track with passing loops
- Track gauge: 760 mm (2 ft 5 15/16 in)
- Minimum radius: 60 m (197 ft)
- Operating speed: 25 km/h (15.5 mph)
- Maximum incline: 2.5 %

Höllentalbahn
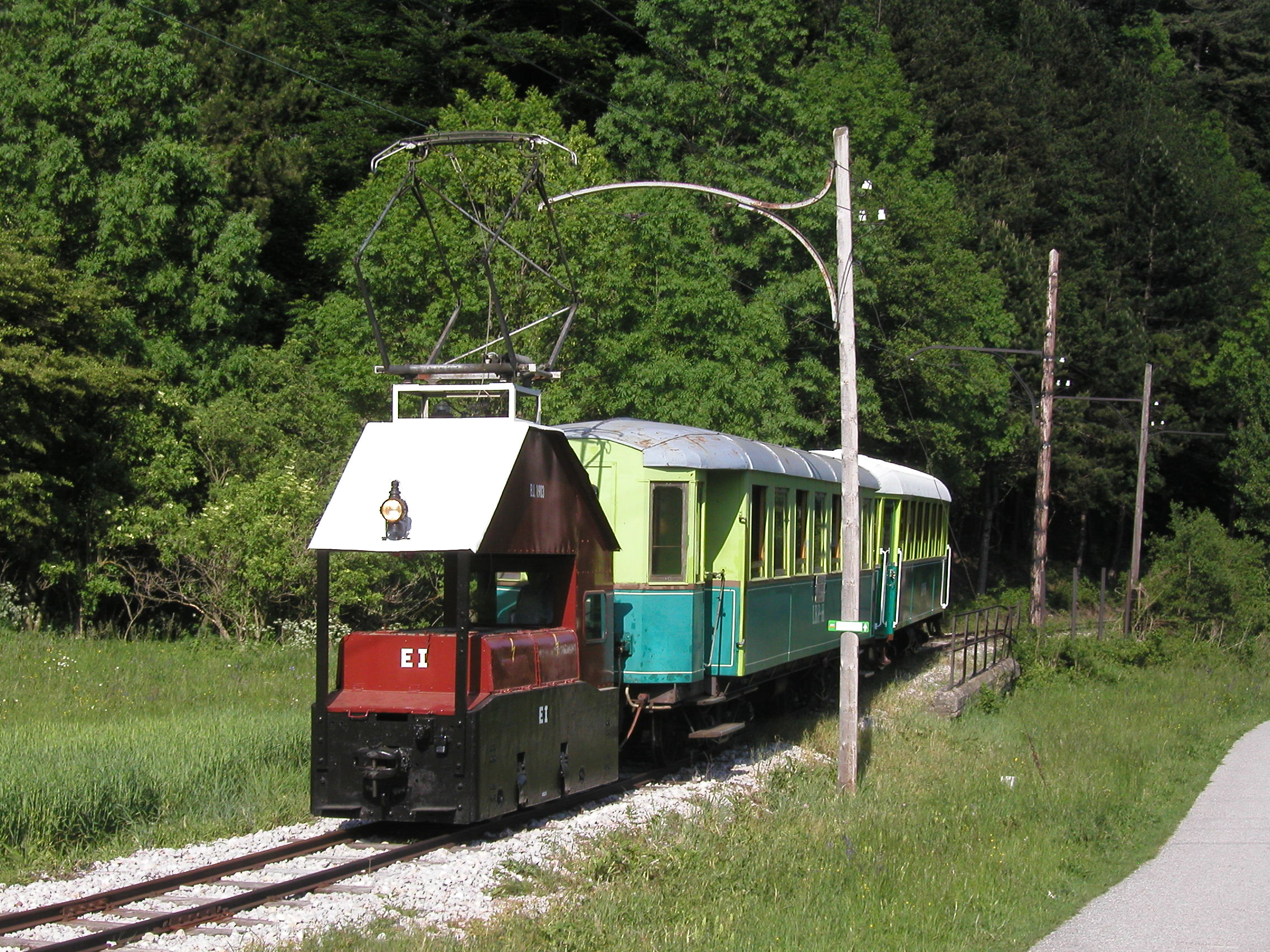

Commercial operations
- Original gauge: 760 mm (2 ft 5 15/16 in)
- Original electrification: 550 V DC Overhead line

Preserved operations
- Owned by: Payerbach Hirschwang GmbH
- Operated by: Austrian Society for Local Railways (ÖGLB)
- Length: 5 km (3.1 mi)
- Preserved gauge: 760 mm (2 ft 5 15/16 in)
- Preserved electrification: 550 V DC Overhead line

Commercial history
- Opened: 1918, Freight traffic 1926, Passenger traffic
- Closed: 1963, Passenger traffic 1982, Freight traffic

Preservation history
- 1979: Taken over by the (ÖGLB)

The Lower Austrian Höllental Railway (German: Höllentalbahn) is a narrow gauge electric railway with a track gauge of 760 mm (2 ft 5 15/16 in), which runs from the Austrian Federal Railways (ÖBB) station of Payerbach Reichenau on the Semmering Railway for approximately five kilometres (3 mi) through the market town of Reichenau an der Rax to Hirschwang.

== History ==
The railway opened in 1918 to serve a paper mill and was opened to passengers and general goods traffic in 1926. Apart from local commuter traffic the railway also served tourist groups as a feeder for the Rax Cable Car, the first cable car in Austria which also opened in 1926. At the beginning of the 1960s large scale investment was needed, so in 1963 passenger traffic was stopped and replaced by post office buses. The goods traffic, in particular to the paper mill in Hirschwang, continued until 1982.

In 1977 the Austrian Society for Local Railways (ÖGLB) was created, and in 1979 began operating passenger trips for tourists on weekends in the summer. Since other traffic has ceased the ÖGLB has also been responsible for maintenance of the railway. The original operator of the railway, Payerbach Hirschwang GmbH, is still in existence and the legal owner.

== Rolling stock ==
The original electrical locomotives E1 to E3 are regarded as icons of the railway. They were originally supplied with several sister locomotives for the building of the Karawanken Railway Tunnel. Constructed in 1903 they rank amongst the oldest electric locomotives still operating anywhere in the world. After several changes they received their characteristic appearance, which lead to the nickname "driving summer-house". A further electric locomotive (E4) was supplied 1927 by AEG Vienna, however this locomotive was only used for working at Hirschwang.

Two tramcars (No. 1 and 2) and four trailers (No. 11 to 14) were built for passenger traffic in 1926 by Grazer Waggonfabrik. These cars were very generously dimensioned and at that time were the largest narrow gauge vehicles of Austria. By 1963 these were the only passenger vehicles in use, and after passenger traffic ceased they were sold to the Zillertal Railway. The trailers were altered and used as passenger vehicles, and the tramcars were dismantled and converted to trucks. The trailers were brought back to the Höllental Railway in 1986 and restored. A tramcar was reconstructed from the original bogies and one of the trailers. This reconstructed tramcar commenced operation in 2005.

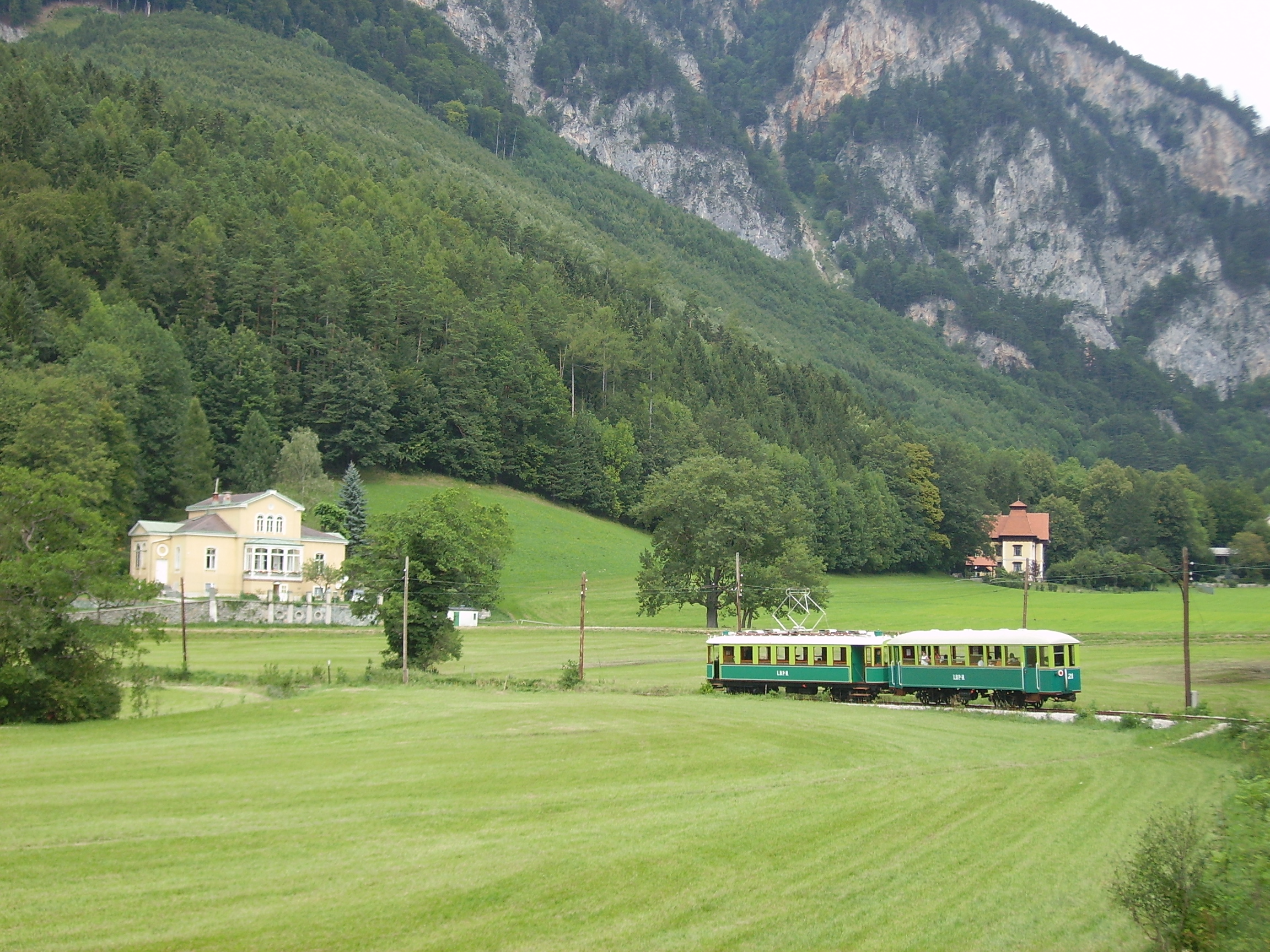
Reichenau - Thalhofstraße Museumsbahn

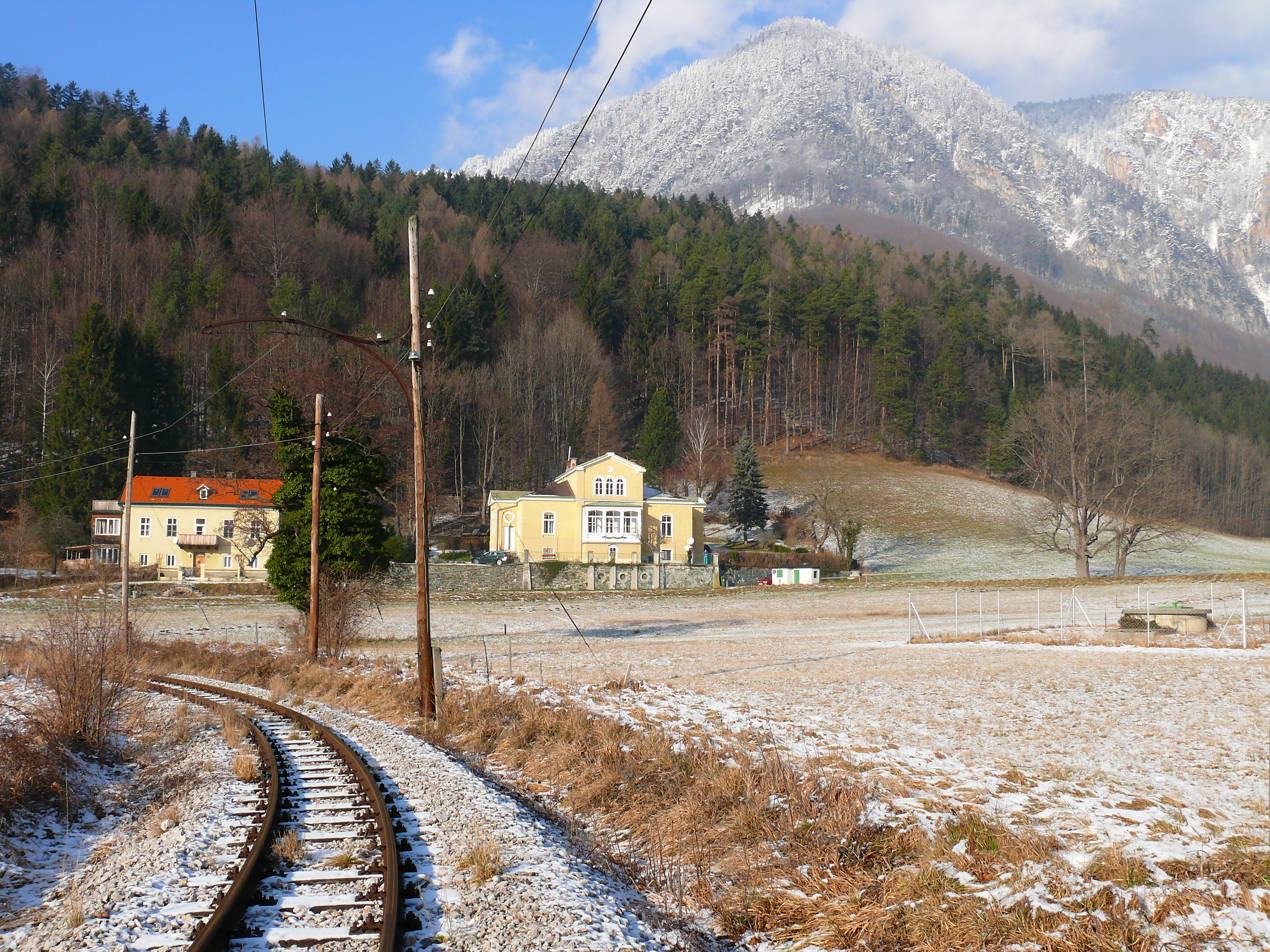
Reichenau Thalhofstraße in Winter

In the 1970s the condition of the electrical equipment deteriorated, two ex-army Feldbahn diesel locomotives of the type HF 130 C were acquired. These were sold after the goods traffic ceased. In 1997 a locomotive of this type was again purchased, and several smaller diesel locomotives have also been used for work trains.

Since the line has operated as a preserved railway, several steam engines have been used. Beside some industrial and feldbahn locomotives, U1 class ÖBB 298,51 and the "Molln", ÖBB 298,104, have been used for a short time. In 1990 the ÖGLB took over operation of the Ybbstal Railway "mountain line" and transferred the large steam locomotives there.

== Engineering ==
The Höllentalbahn operates on a 550 Volt system. Its track has a minimum radius of 60 m (200 ft), and a maximum gradient of 2.5% (1:40). Maximum allowable speed on the railway is 25 km/h (16 mph).
