= Reichenau an der Rax =

- Municipality
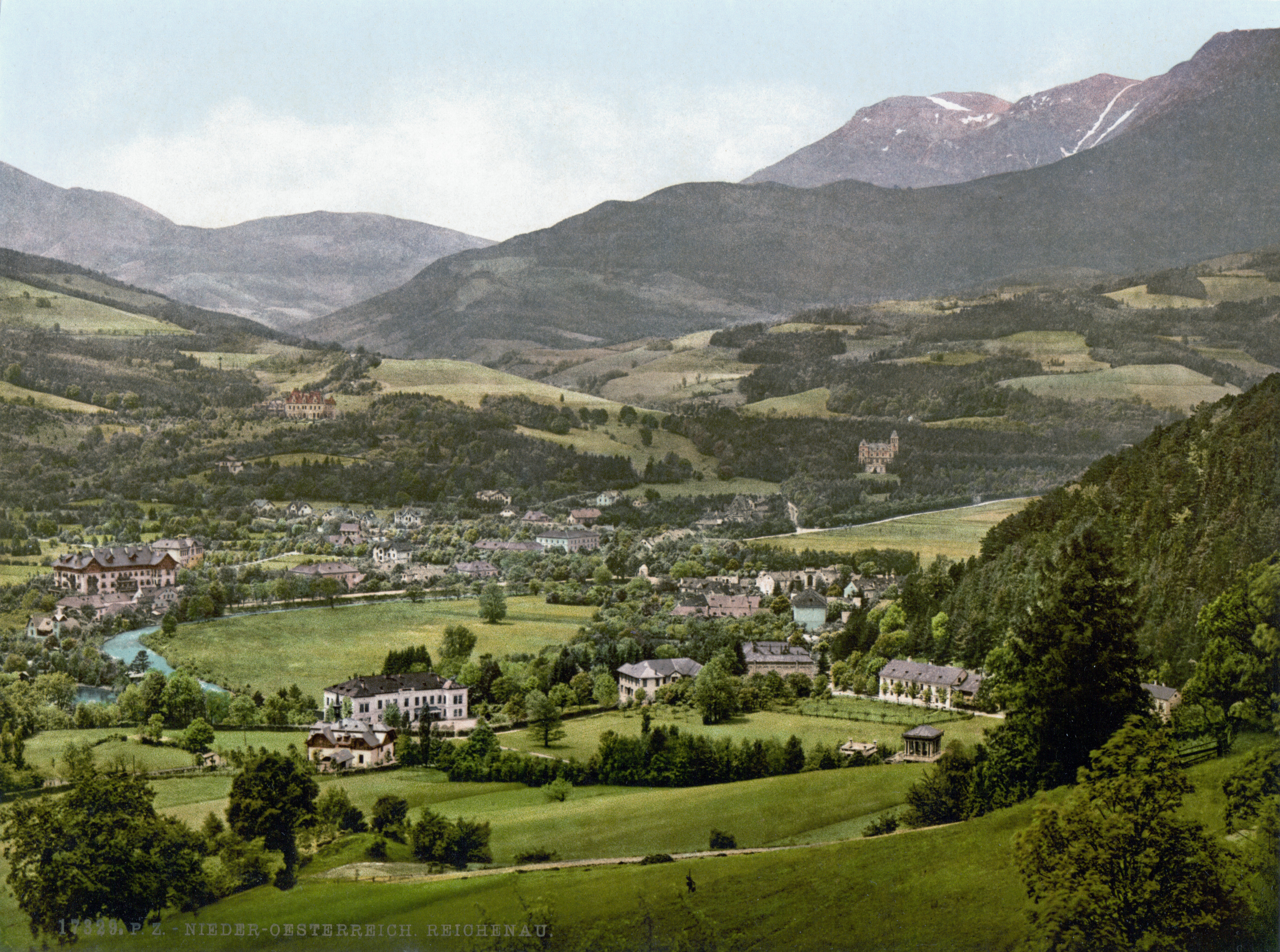
- Reichenau about 1900

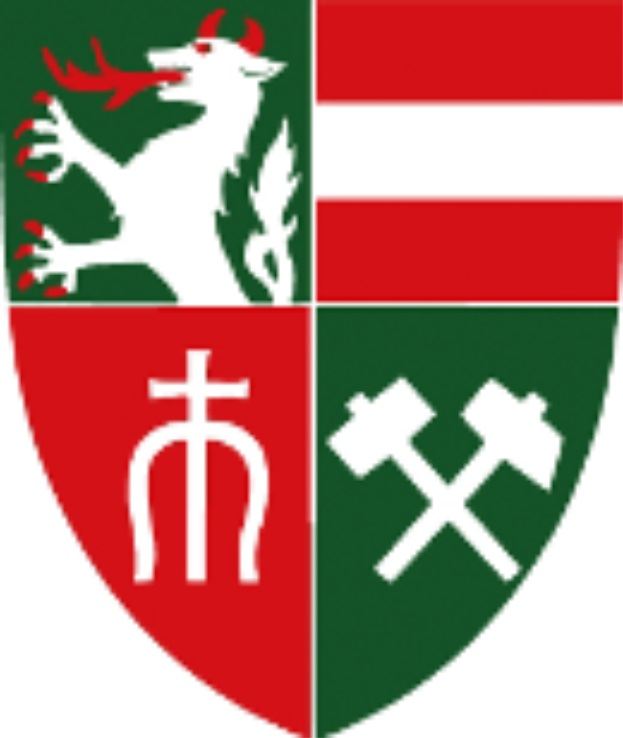
- Coat of arms

- Location within Austria
- Coordinates: 47°42′N 15°50′E
- Country: Austria
- State: Lower Austria
- District: Neunkirchen

Government
  - Mayor: Johann Döller (ÖVP)

Area
  - Total: 89.55 km^{2} (34.58 sq mi)
- Elevation: 484 m (1,588 ft)

Population (2018-01-01)
  - Total: 2,571
  - Density: 28.71/km^{2} (74.36/sq mi)
- Time zone: UTC+1 (CET)
  - Summer (DST): UTC+2 (CEST)
- Postal code: 2651
- Area code: 02666
- Website: www.reichenau.at

Reichenau an der Rax is a market town in the Austrian state of Lower Austria, situated at the foot of the Rax mountain range on the Schwarza river, a headstream of the Leitha.

== History ==
Reichenau castle was first mentioned in a 1256 deed. Duke Otto IV the Merry, who in 1327 had established the abbey of Neuberg, acquired Reichenau in 1333 and granted it to the monastery.

Originally an ore mining and forestry area, Reichenau due to its picturesque setting became a summer resort of the Viennese nobility in the 19th century. From 1854 on the development of the area was decisively promoted by the opening of the Semmering railway line with a train station in neighbouring Payerbach, part of the Austrian Southern Railway (Südbahn) from the Vienna Südbahnhof to Trieste. Reichenau was directly connected to Payerbach by the Höllentalbahn narrow gauge railway in 1926 at the same time with the opening of the Raxseilbahn, the oldest aerial tramway in Austria.

In 1873 a drinking water pipeline to Vienna was built to supply the Austro-Hungarian capital with mountain water rising from the Rax range.

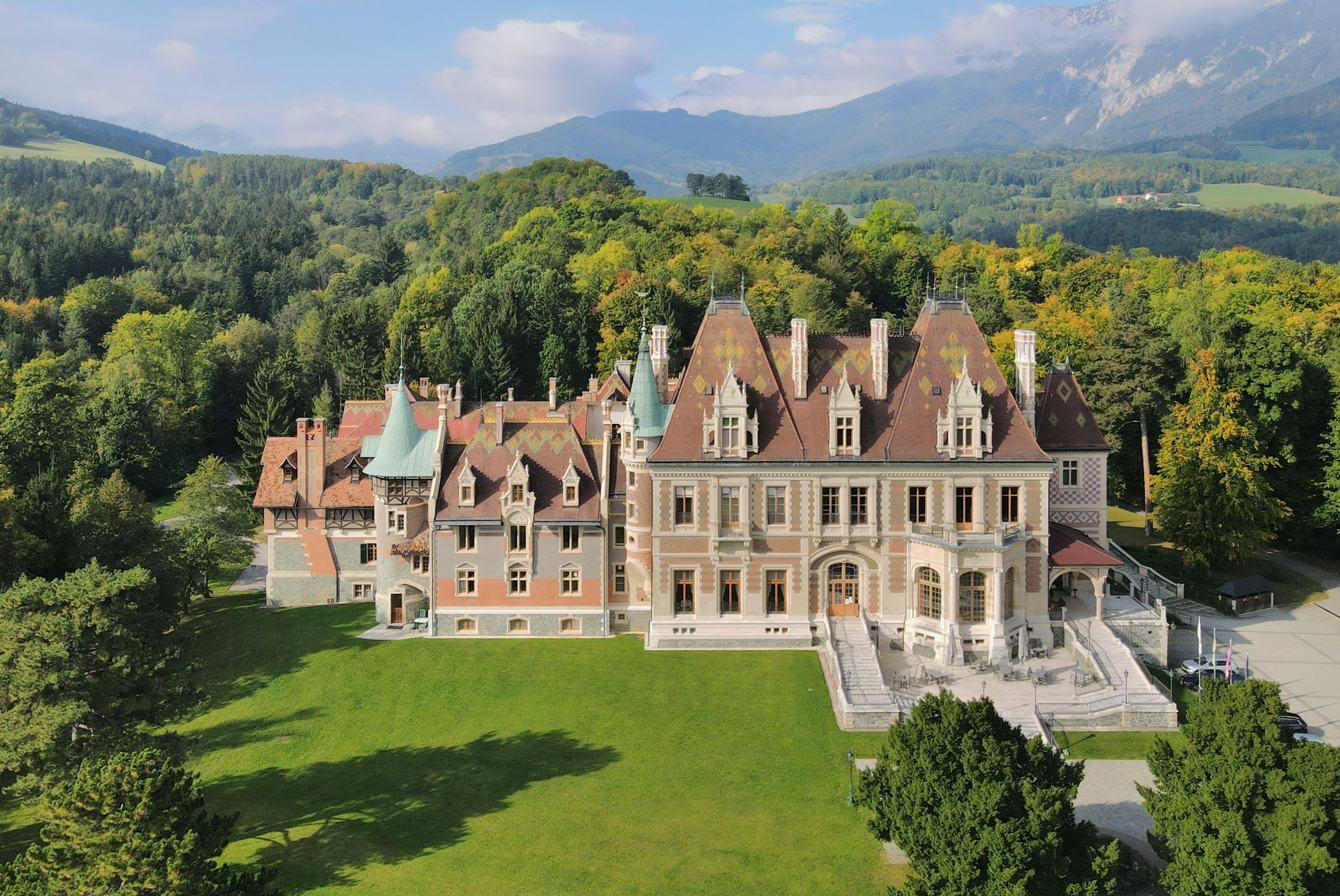
Hinterleiten Palace

In 1872 Archduke Charles Louis of Austria had the Villa Wartholz residence erected near his favourite hunting grounds, according to plans by Heinrich von Ferstel. In 1889 Nathaniel Anselm von Rothschild followed with the building of Hinterleiten Palace. He however did not spend much time in Reichenau and shortly afterwards donated the palais to a veterans foundation, while the Villa Wartholz remained a seat of the Habsburg family, especially of Charles and his wife Zita; their first son, Otto, was born and baptized there, and when Charles become Emperor of Austria, Villa Wartholz was his summer residence in the years 1917 and 1918.

Reichenau was the summer retreat of the author Heimito von Doderer, where he wrote large parts of his novel The Strudlhof Steps.

The priest Heinrich Maier, head of a Catholic Austrian resistance group during the Nazi era, was a chaplain in Reichenau in the 1930s. His resistance group successfully passed on plans and production facilities for V-1, V-2 rockets, Tiger tanks and aircraft (Messerschmitt Bf 109, Messerschmitt Me 163 Komet, etc.) to the Allies. This enabled the Allies to target decisive armament factories and to protect residential areas.

== Notable people ==
- Otto von Habsburg, head of the House of Habsburg from 1922 to 2006, was born at Villa Wartholz in Reichenau on 20 November 1912.
- Theodor Herzl died in Edlach, a village of Reichenau an der Rax, on July 3, 1904.

== Transport ==
Beside the Südbahn railway line, Reichenau can be reached via the B27 Höllental Straße federal highway running from Gloggnitz and the S6 Semmering Schnellstraße expressway to Rohr im Gebirge.

== Gallery ==
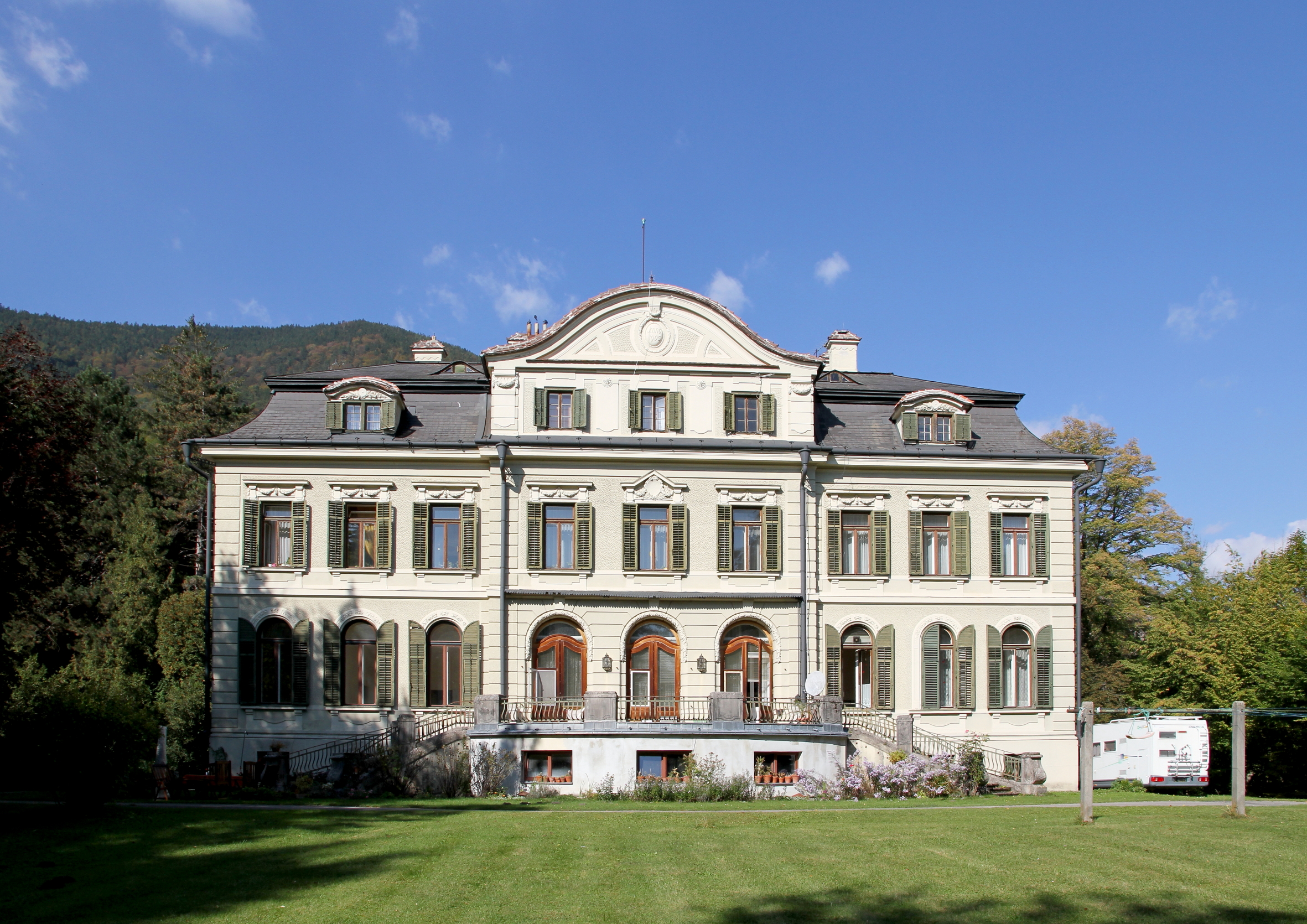
Hirschwang - Villa Schoeller

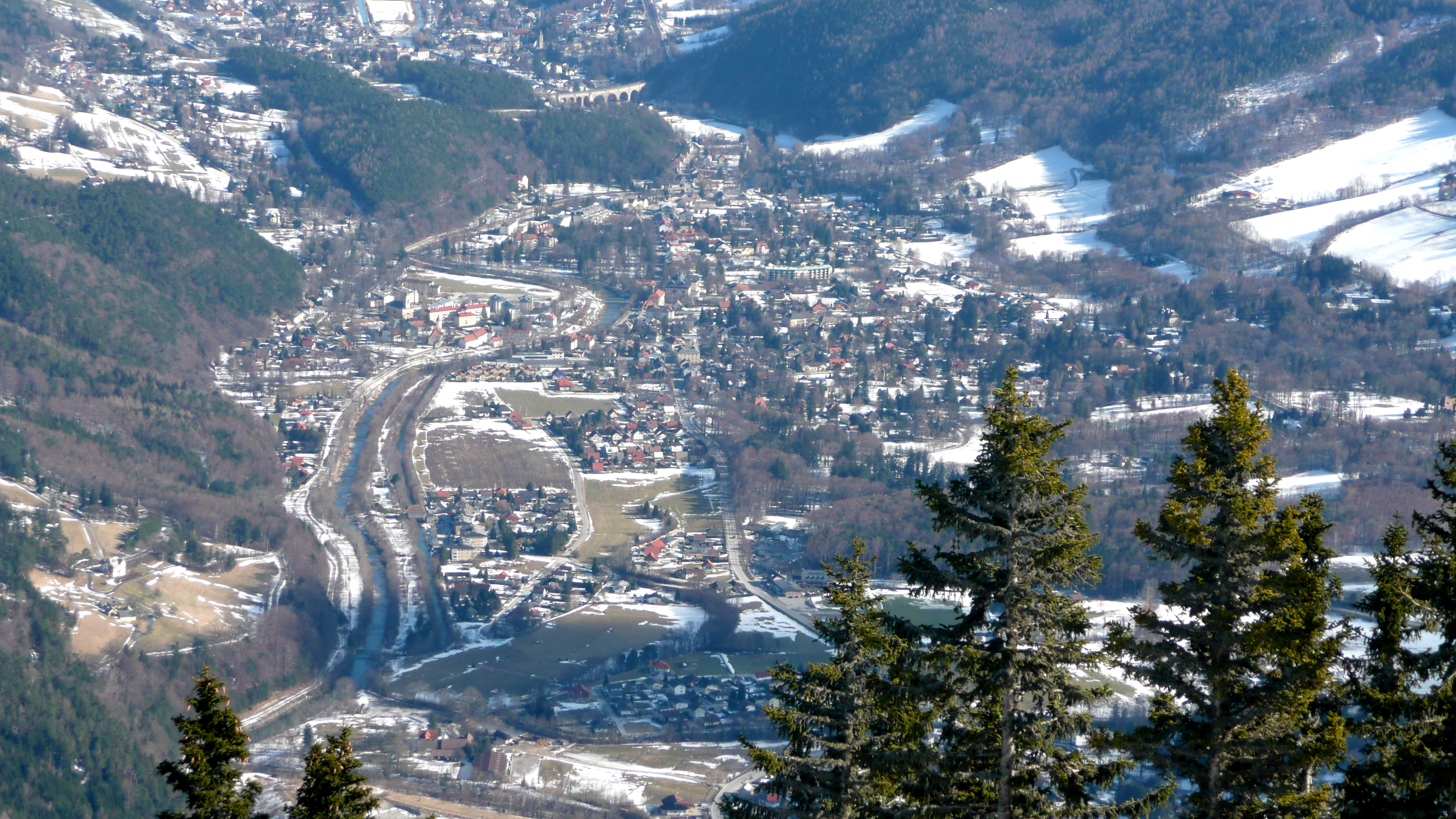
Hirschwang-Reichenau

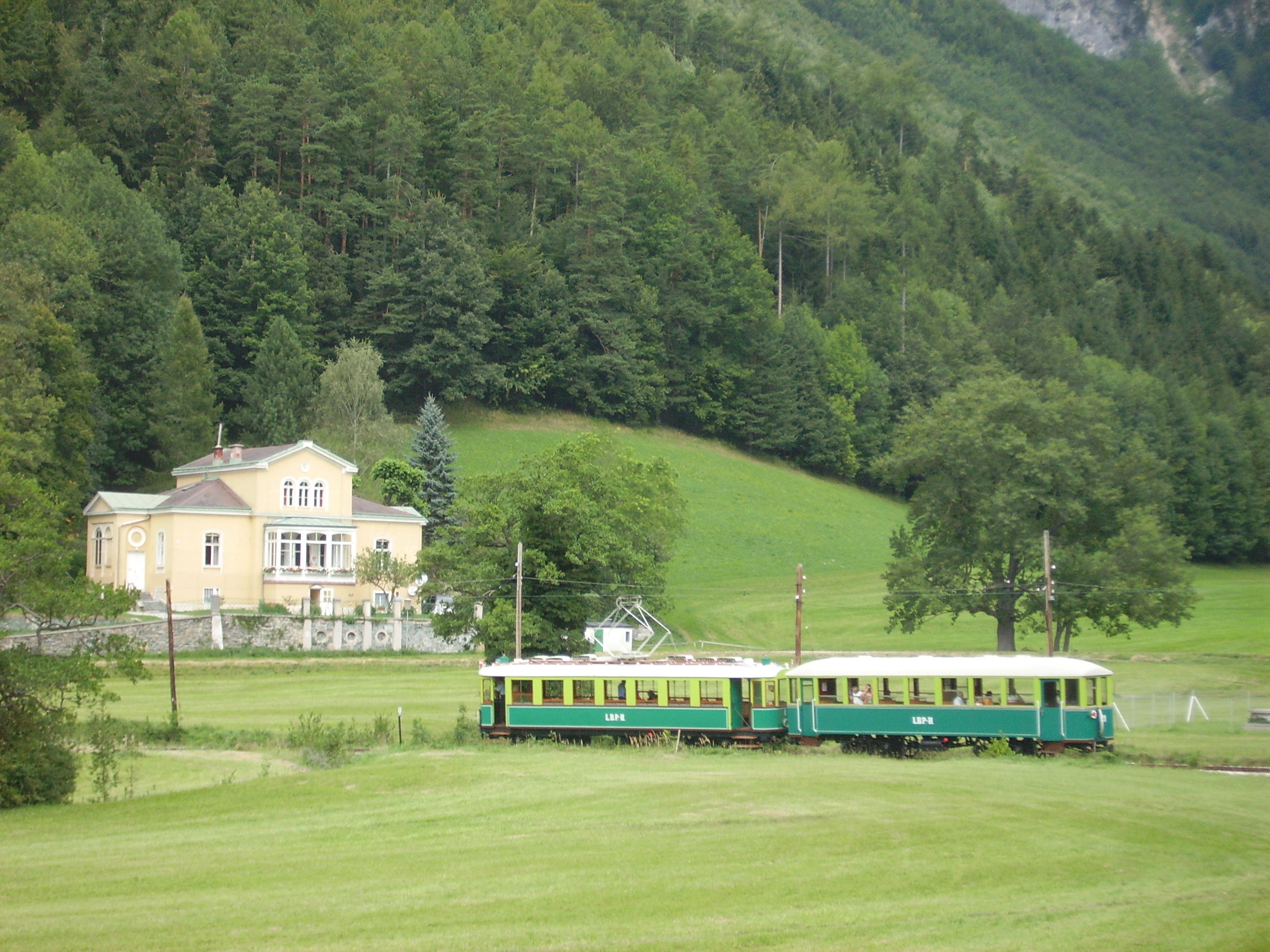
Höllental Railway near the Thalhof road

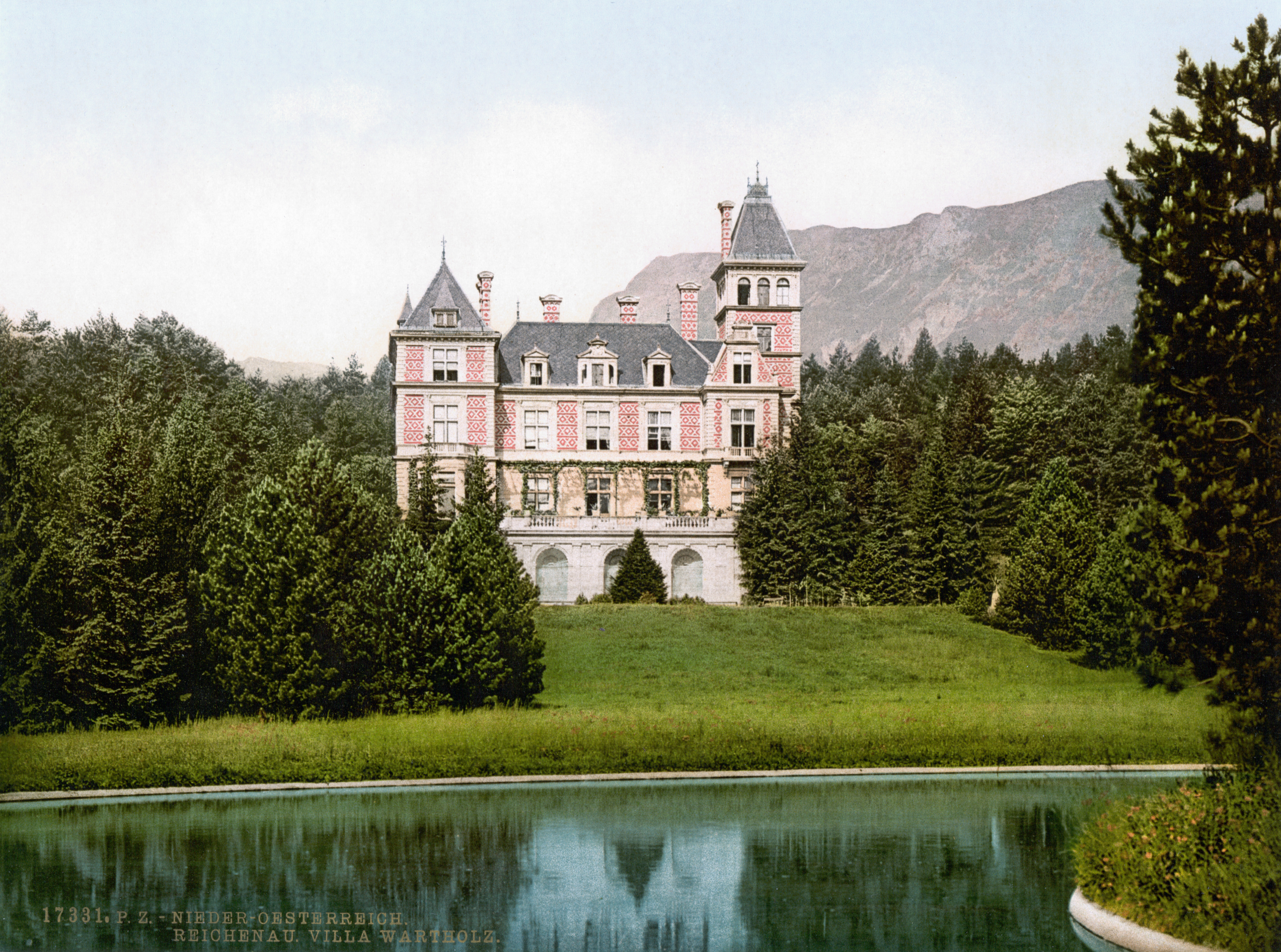
Villa Wartholz

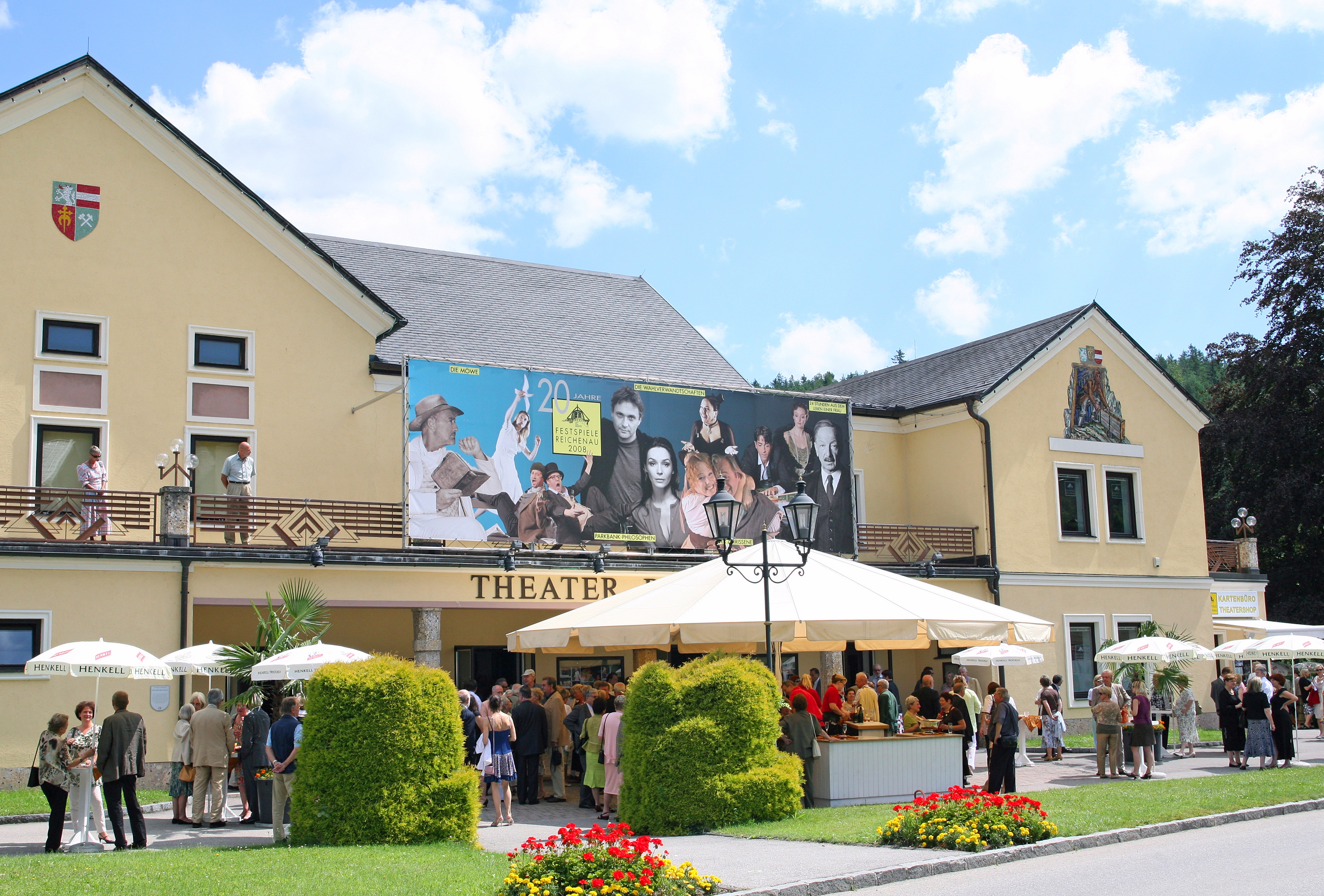
Theater

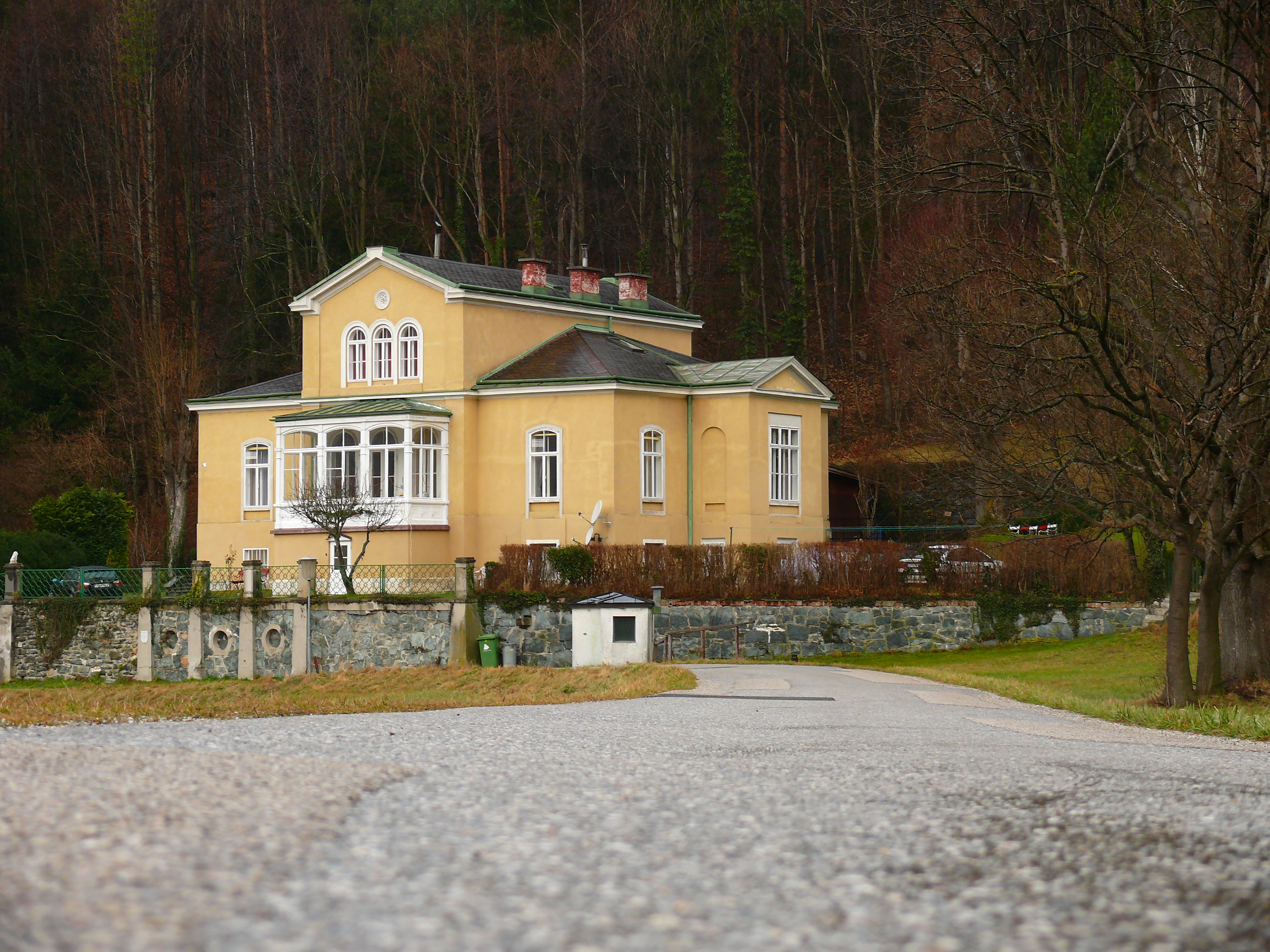
Schlösschen on the Thalhof road

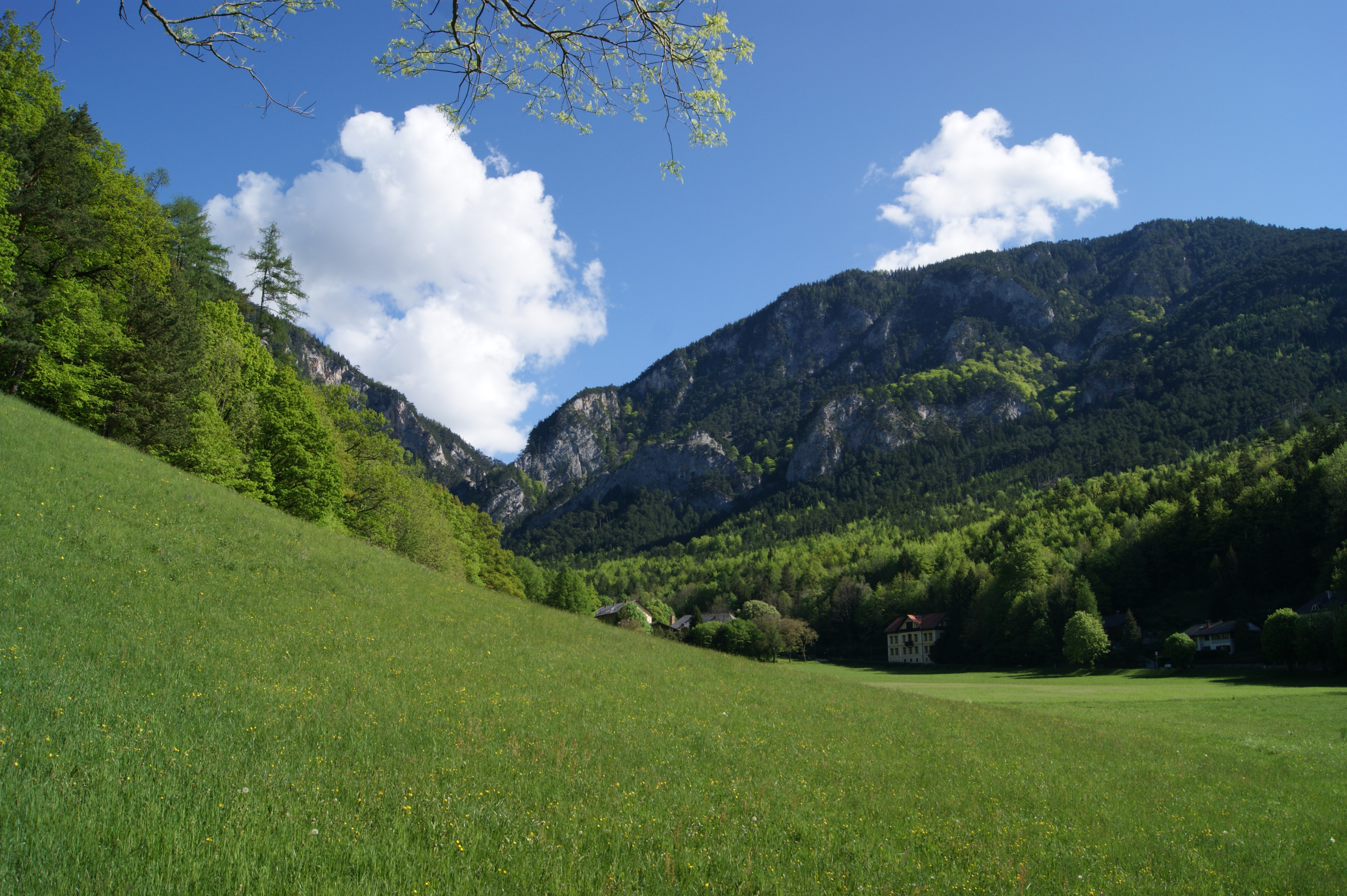
Thalhof road - View into the valley to Feuchter

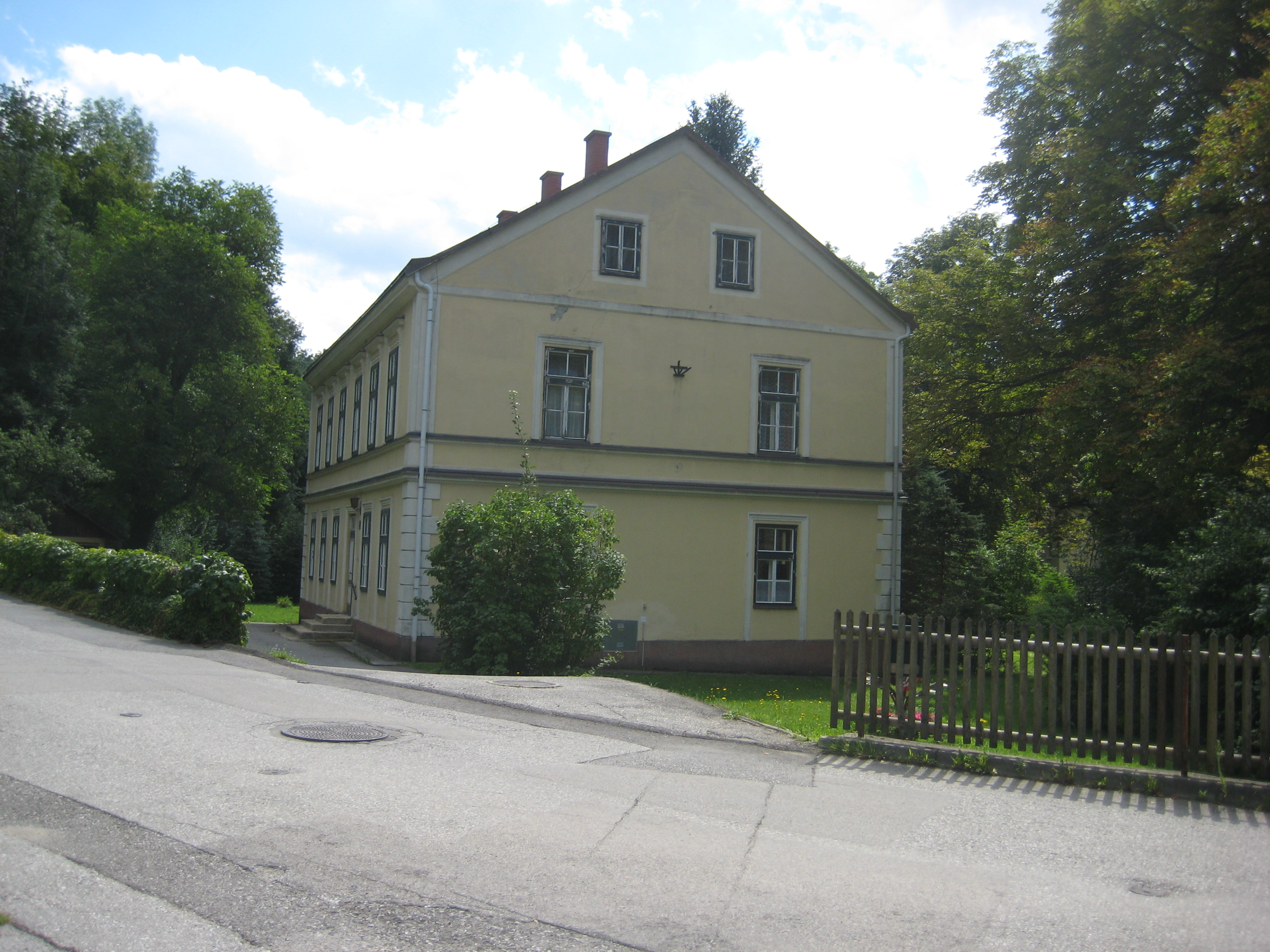
Vicarage, former Villa Doringer

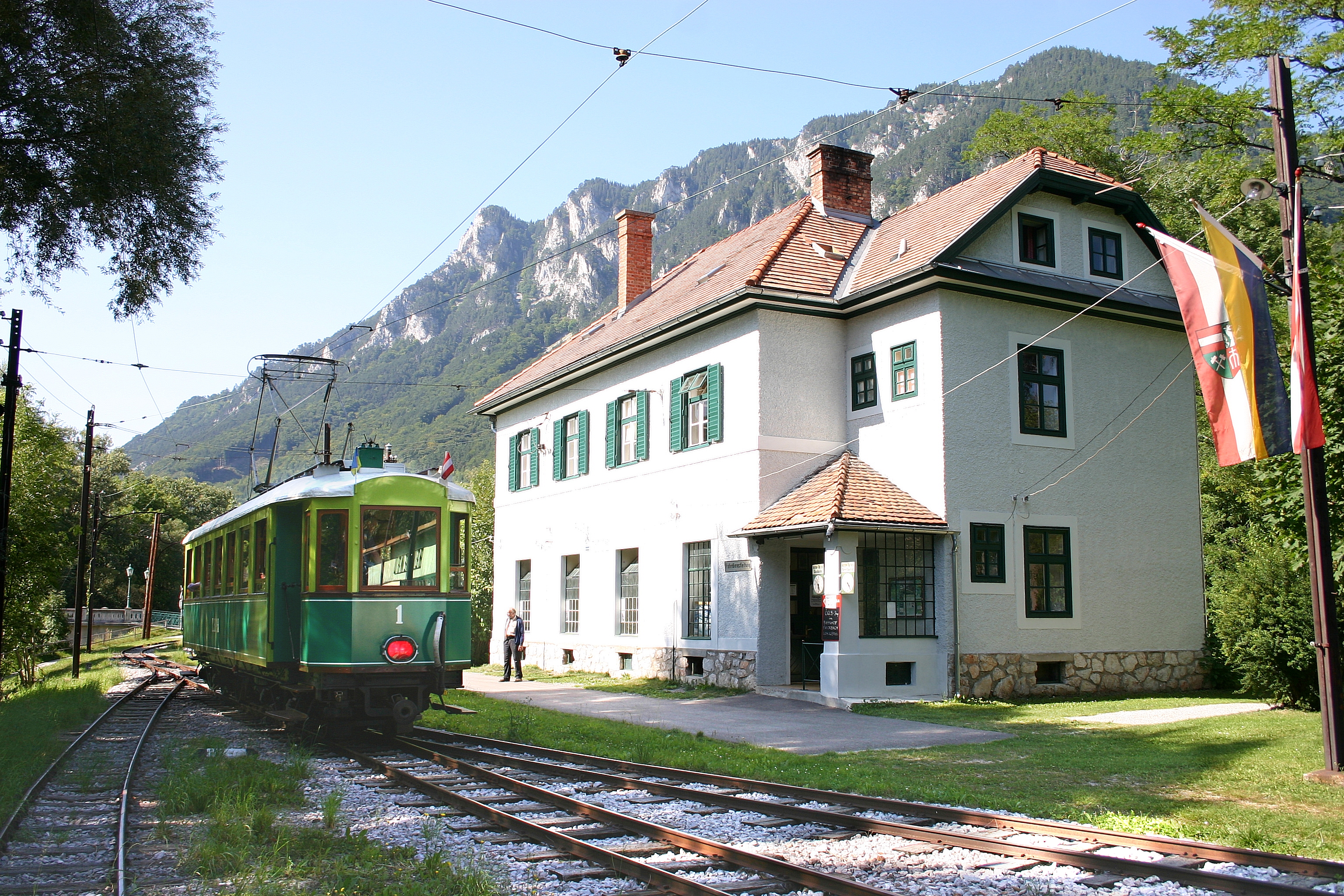
Höllental Railway operations building

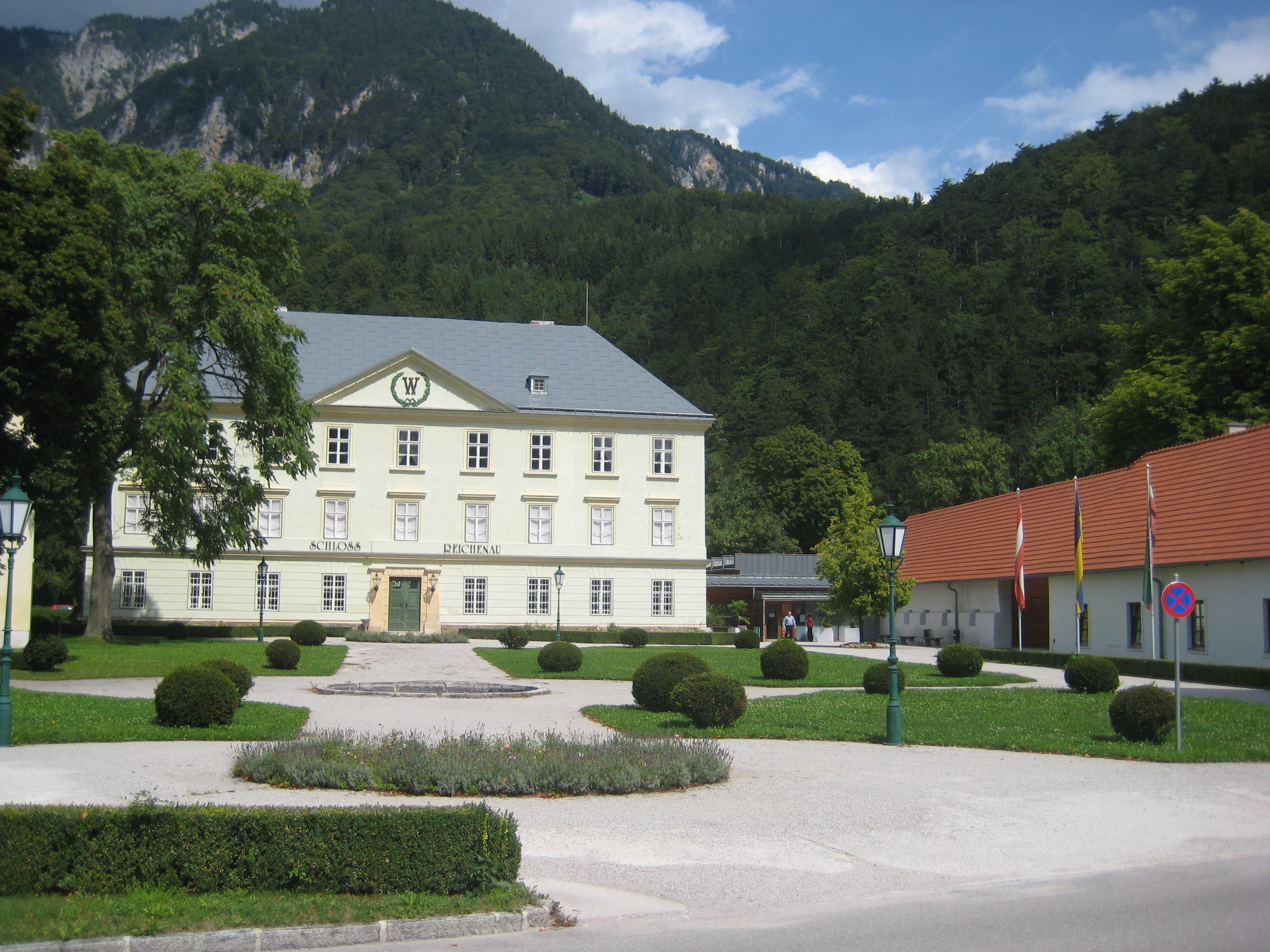
Schloss Reichenau

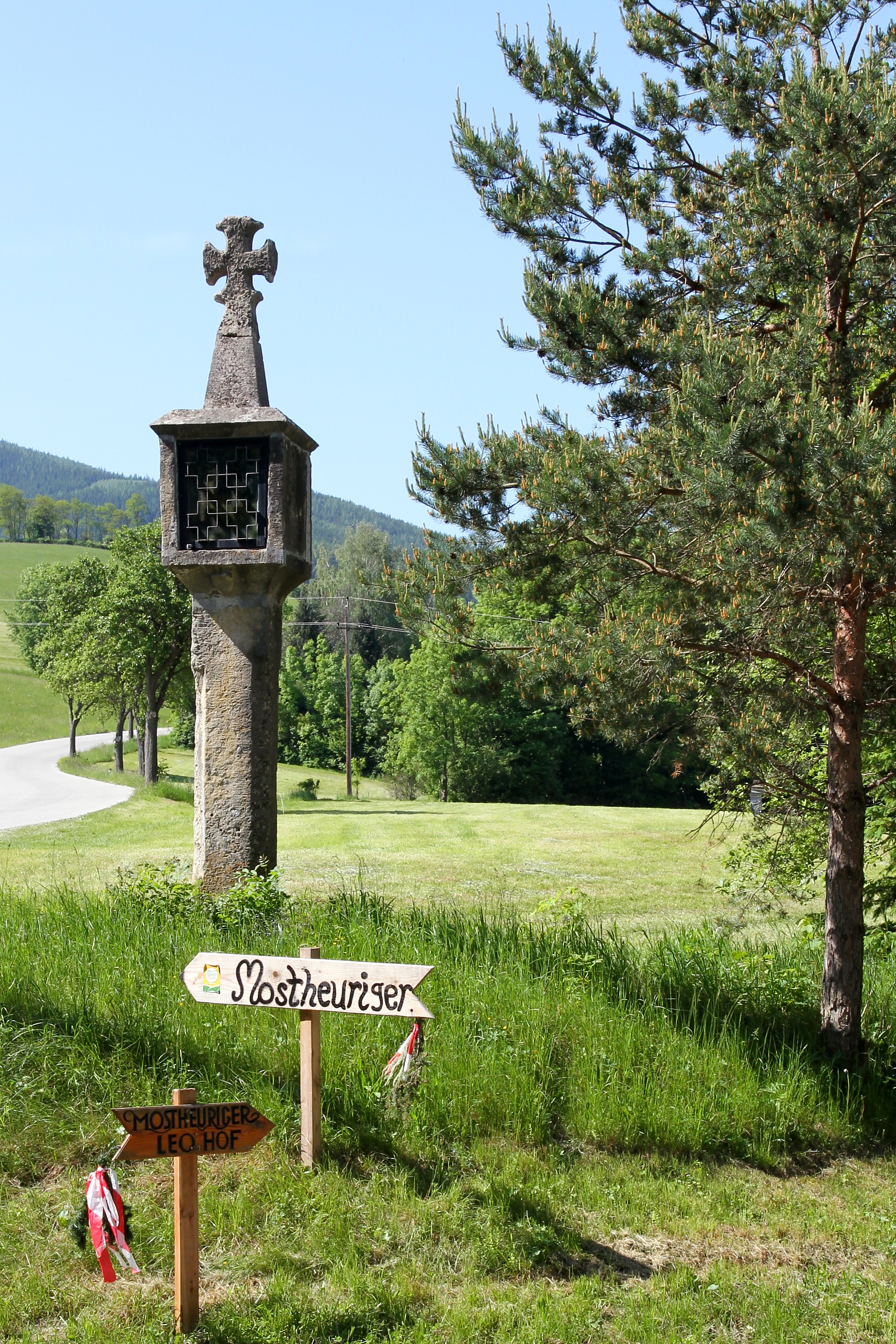
Wartholz Cross

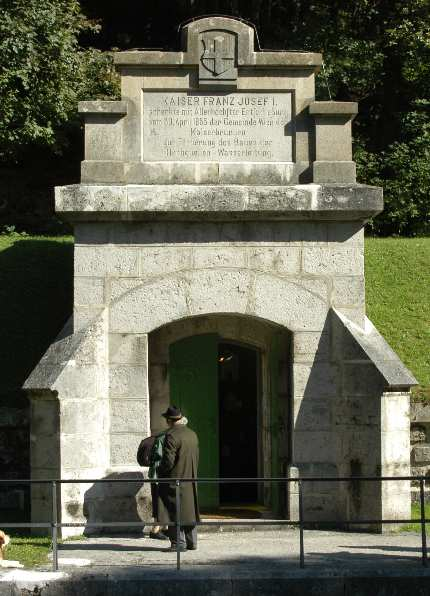
Kaiser Fountain

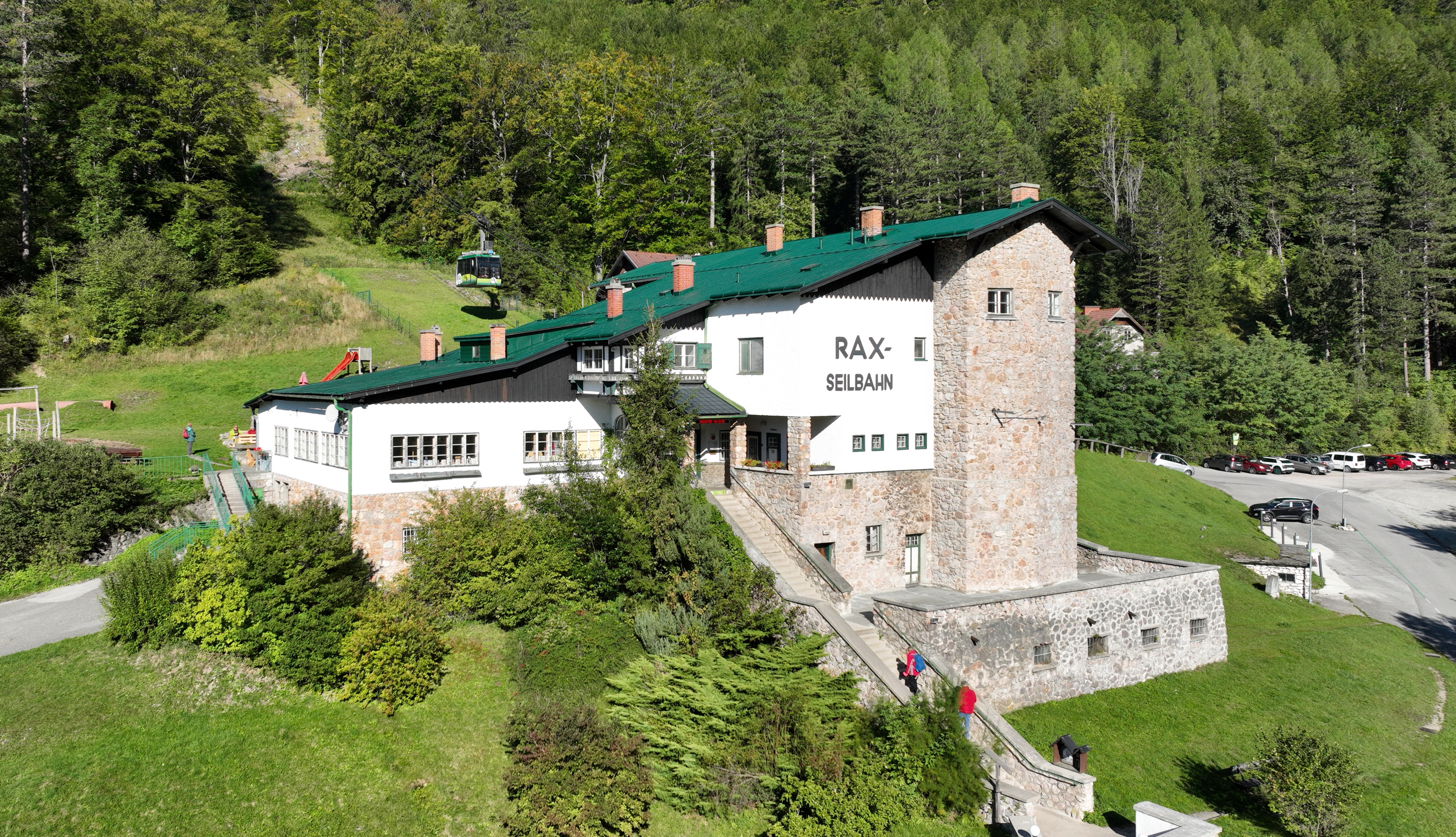
Valley station of the Rax cable car

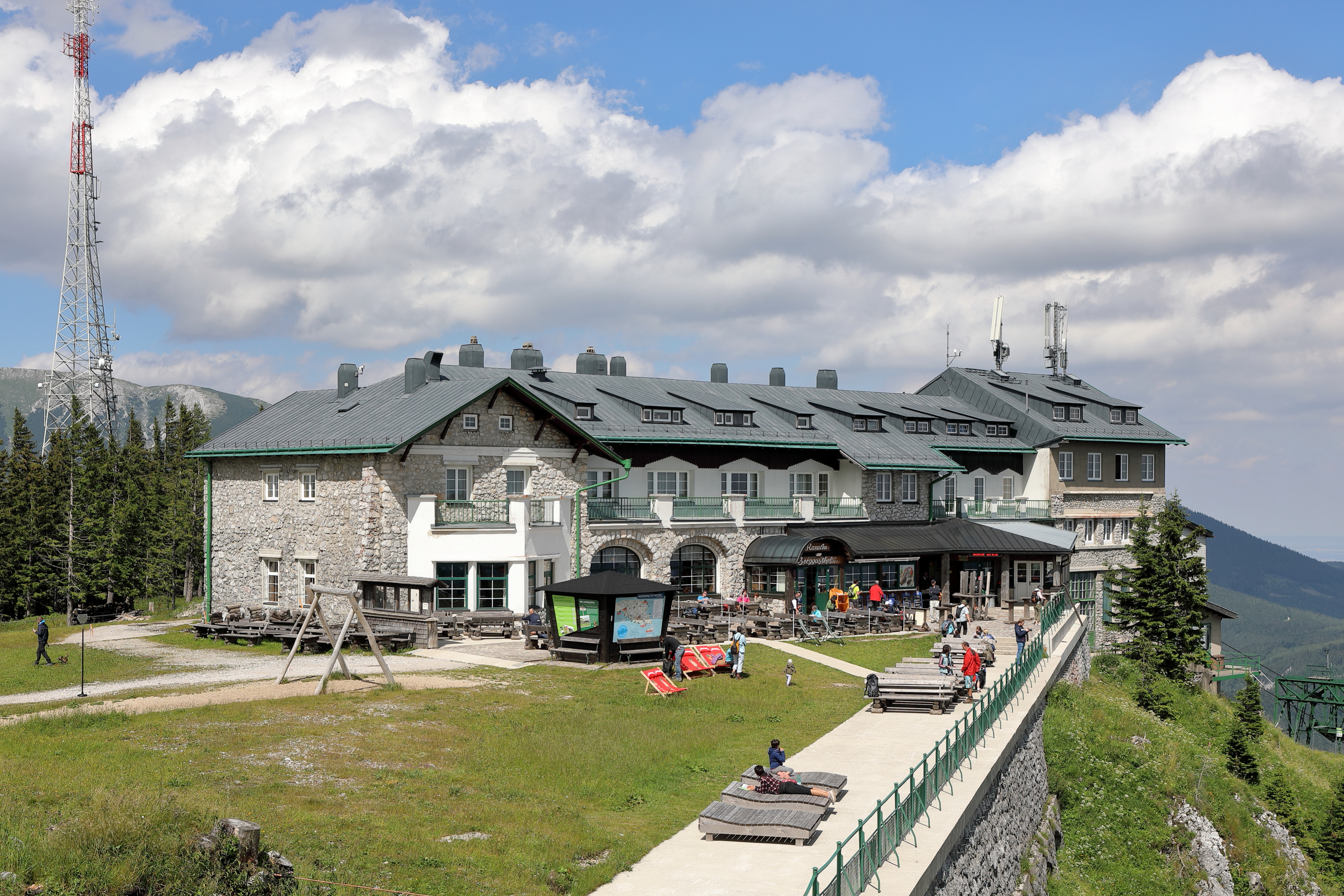
Top station with restaurant of the Rax cable car

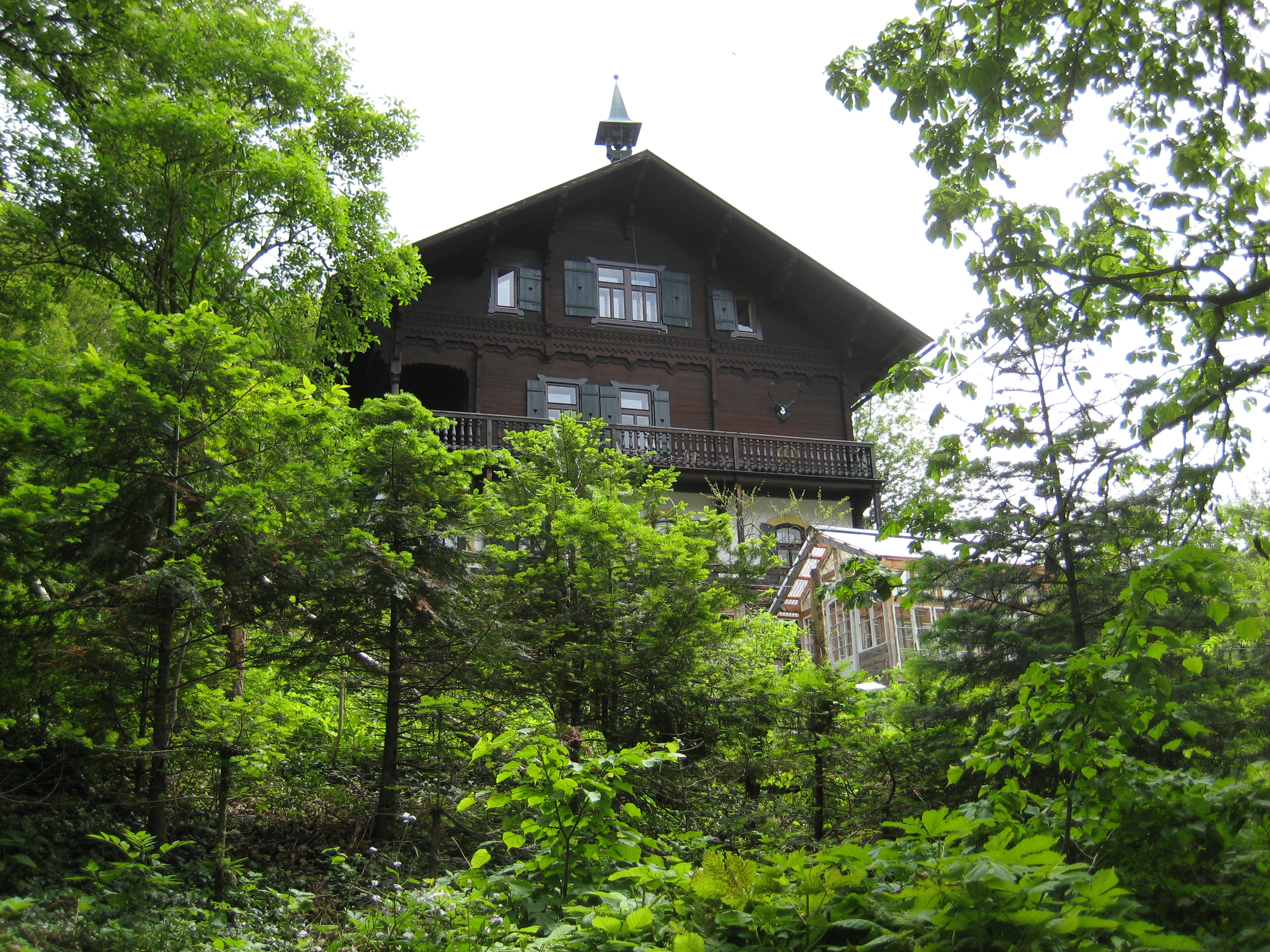
Waldhütte Villa
