= Villa Wartholz =

Historical villa in Austria

Coordinates: 47°41′54″N 15°49′35″E

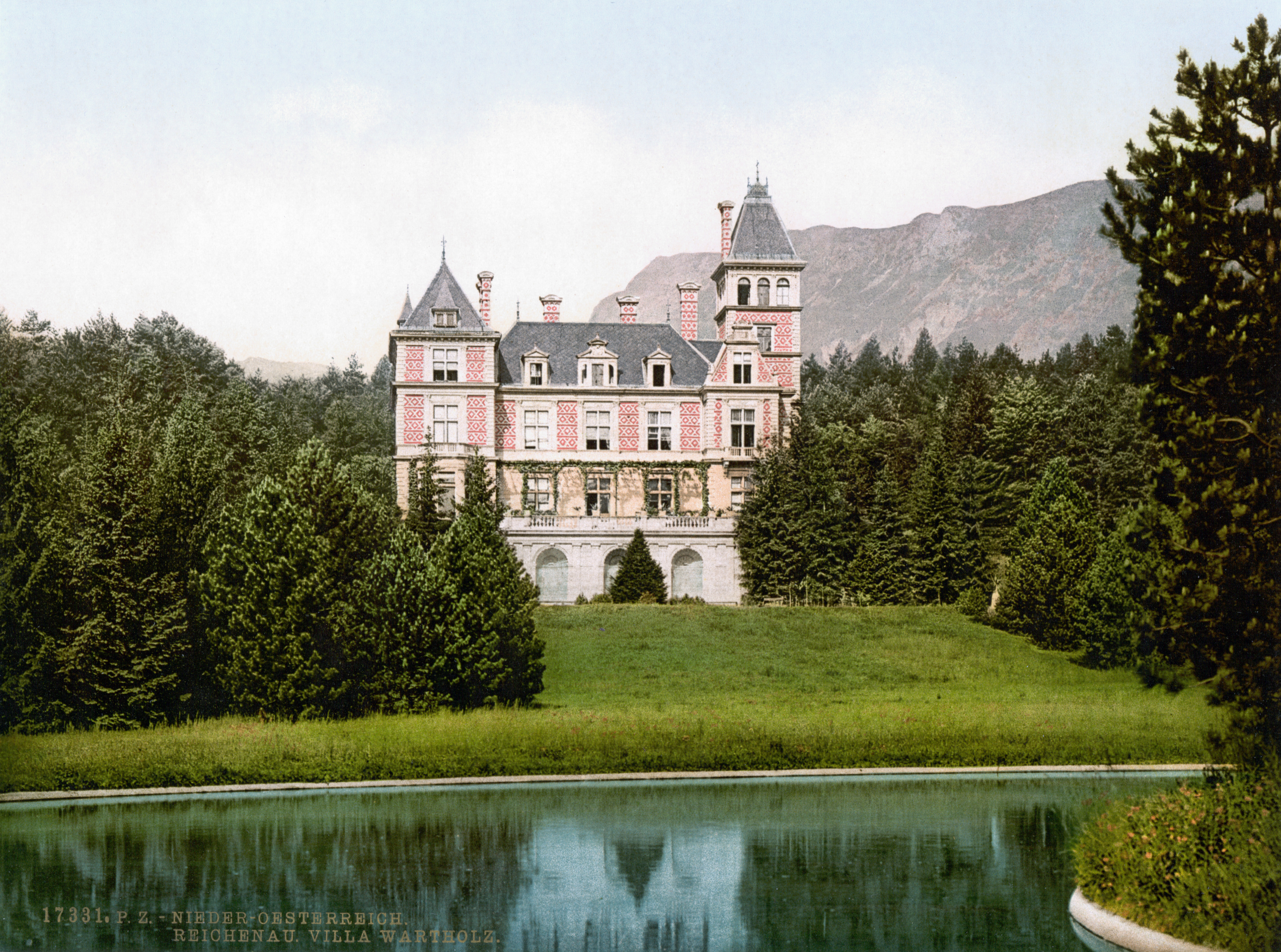
Villa Wartholz, 1900

The Villa Wartholz or Castle Wartholz is a former imperial villa in Reichenau an der Rax in Lower Austria.

== History ==
Villa Wartholz was designed by Heinrich von Ferstel in the historicist style in the years 1870 to 1872 for Archduke Karl Ludwig of Austria. The castle-like building with towers was for recreational purposes, not for military means. The villa was designed with a view over the valley. Karl Ludwig spent so much time in this area, he reserved this place only for hunting by the imperial court. It was built near by his home Karl-Ludwig-Haus on the Rax.

This area around Reichenau was a popular tourist area for the aristocratic society since the construction of the Southern Railway. Members of the imperial family, and other members of the nobility, artists and scientists met at the Villa Wartholz. Nearby another palace subsequently arose, the Schloss Rothschild.

The villa also was used by Emperor Charles I of Austria and Empress Zita. Their son, Otto von Habsburg (1912 – 2011) was born in Villa Wartholz. His baptism and first Communion were received in the chapel, which was located in the villa. On 17 August 1917, Emperor Charles held a ceremony where he handed over the Military Order of Maria Theresa to 24 officers, among them Kövess, Dankl, Arz, Johann Haas von Haagenfels, Wenzel von Wurm, Cavallar and Banfield.

Due to the Habsburg Law the Wartholz villa was owned by the Austrian state. The Habsburgs staked a claim of private ownership and for many years this was a point of contention whether they would be reinstituted as owners. In 1973, the government sold the mansion to the State of Lower Austria. From this it was again sold in 1982 and is now privately owned.

== Name ==
The name derives from a cross on a nearby late-Gothic object, Wayside shrine with the name waiting. This cross is from the period around 1500.

== Events ==
Since 2008, the castle holds an annual Wartholz literature competition.
