= Rax-Schneeberg Group =

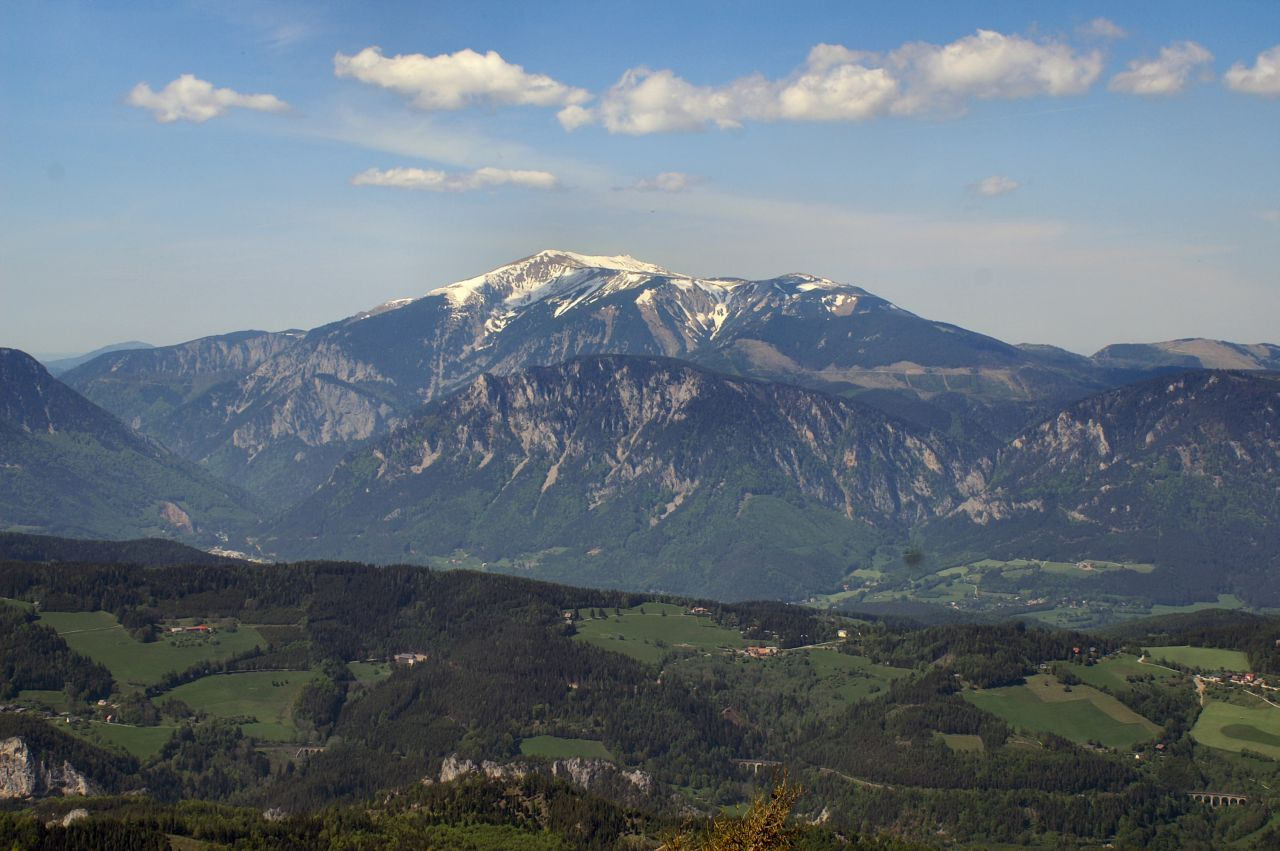
- View of Schneeberg from the Sonnwendstein

Highest point
- Peak: Schneeberg (Klosterwappen)
- Elevation: 2,076 metres (6,811 ft) AA
- Coordinates: 47°46′03″N 15°48′28″E

Dimensions
- Length: 32 km (20 mi)

Geography
- Country: Austria
- States: Lower Austria and Styria
- Parent range: Northern Limestone Alps

The Rax-Schneeberg Group (German: Rax-Schneeberg-Gruppe) is a mountain range in the Northern Limestone Alps on the Styrian-Lower Austrian border in Austria.

== Location ==
According to the official classification of the Eastern Alps by the Alpine Club (Alpenvereinseinteilung der Ostalpen), the Rax-Schneeberg Group is bounded by the following divisions to neighbouring groups of mountains:

- to the north by the Klostertaler Gscheid – Klausgraben – Mamauwiese – Sebastiansbach – Puchberg
- to the northeast by the valley of the River Sierning as far as Ternitz
- to the south by the line: Ternitz – Schwarza near Gloggnitz – Schottwien – Semmering – Mürzzuschlag – Mürz near Kapellen
- to the west by the Altenberg valley – Naßkamm – Naßbach – Schwarza – Voisbach as far as the Klostertaler Gscheid.

== Summits ==
The highest point in the limestone massif of the Schneeberg is the Klosterwappen at 2,076 m above sea level (AA). Its nearby twin peak is known as the Kaiserstein (2,061 m above sea level (AA)). The two summits are the highest mountains in the state of Lower Austria. The highest two elevations in the Rax massif are the Heukuppe at 2,007 m and the Scheibwaldhöhe at 1,943 m.

Other peaks are the Große Scheibe (1,473 m), the Tratenkogel (1,565 m), the Ochnerhöhe (1,403 m) and the Kreuzberg (1,084 m).

== Protected areas ==
The Rax Alpine region, together with the Schneealpe and Schneeberg belong to the river source protected area (Quellschutzgebiet) of the First Vienna Mountain Spring Pipeline (I. Wiener Hochquellenwasserleitung). The Schneeberg and Rax are separated by the Höllental valley and are two of Vienna's "local mountains" or Hausberge.

The Schneeberg and Rax lie within the Northeastern Border Alps: Hohe Wand-Schneeberg-Rax Special Area of Conservation (FFH-Gebiet Nordöstliche Randalpen: Hohe Wand-Schneeberg-Rax).

== Schneeberg Railway ==
The Schneeberg has been linked for over 100 years by the Schneeberg Railway (Schneebergbahn), a cog railway that climbs to a height of 1,800 m. The twin peaks may be reached from the valley station in one to two hours. The footpath runs eastwards over the Hengst or westwards through the Fadenwände.

There are trails to the Rax from the mountain spa of Puchberg am Schneeberg, and from the wild Höllental valley to the south. In addition the Schneeberg may be approached from Payerbach, Prigglitz and Reichenau via the Gahns.
