= Schwarza (Leitha) =

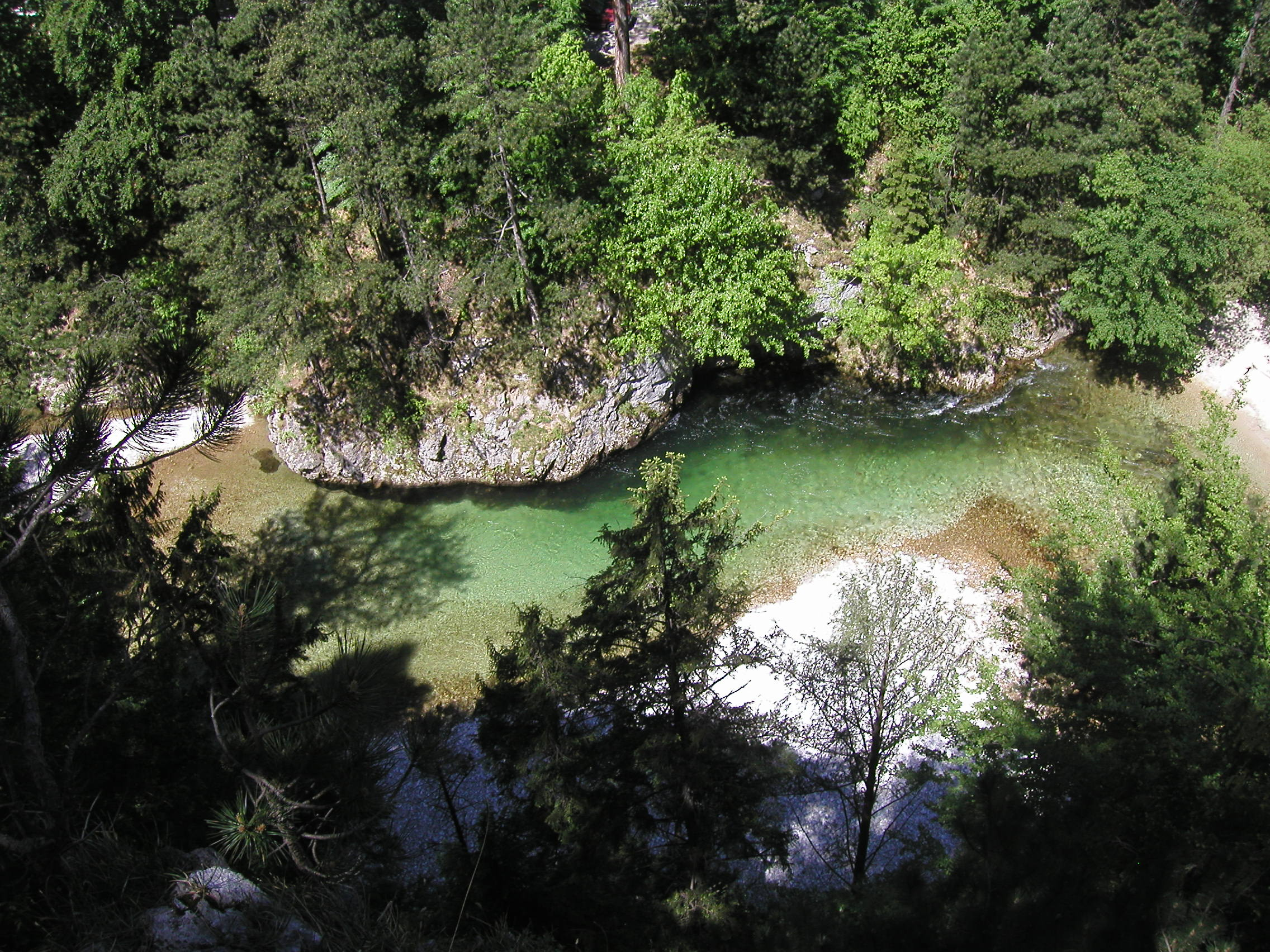
- The Schwarza in the Höllental

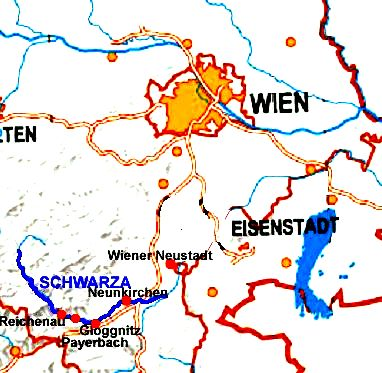
- Map of the Schwarza in southern Lower Austria

Location
- Country: Austria
- State: Lower Austria
- Region: Industrieviertel

Physical characteristics
- Source
  - location: Gutenstein Alps
  - coordinates: 47°52′17″N 15°37′23″E
  - elevation: 833 m (AA)
- Mouth
  - location: Discharges jointly with the River Pitten into the Leitha at Haderswörth
  - coordinates: 47°44′6.56″N 16°13′28.72″E
  - elevation: 302 m (AA)
- Length: 47.7 km (29.6 mi)

Basin features
- Progression: Leitha→ Danube→ Black Sea
- Landmarks: Small towns: Gloggnitz, Ternitz, Neunkirchen; Villages: Rohr im Gebirge, Kaiserbrunn, Schwarzau im Gebirge, Reichenau an der Rax, Payerbach, Pottschach, Wimpassing im Schwarzatale and Schwarzau am Steinfeld.

The Schwarza (German pronunciation: [ˈʃvaʁtsa]) is a river in Lower Austria. It is the left headstream of the Leitha.

== Course ==
The Schwarza originates in the Tiefental valley at the confuence of Grüne Schwarza (German: Green Schwarza) and Dürre Schwarza (German: Dry Schwarza) in the Gutenstein Alps. The Schwarza then flows through Höllental (German: Hell Valley) gorge and the Schwarza valley. Near Haderswörth in the parish of Lanzenkirchen the Schwarza combines with the Pitten and is then called the Leitha. It is 48 kilometres (30 mi) long. Its basin area is 718 km^{2} (277 sq mi). The Schwarza is part of the Natura 2000 region known as "North Eastern Border Alps: Hohe Wand – Schneeberg – Rax" (Nordöstliche Randalpen: Hohe Wand - Schneeberg - Rax).

== Character ==
The Schwarza is characterized in its upper reaches by undercuts, high cliffs, gravel banks, pools and deep gullies. The lower reaches below Hirschwang an der Rax are strictly regulated as far as Schwarzau am Steinfeld. Only between Schwarzau am Steinfeld and Bad Erlach can the Schwarza spread out into wide meanders again. From Loipersbach the Schwarza runs along a sinkage section (Versickerungsstrecke), where the bulk of the water seeps into the gravel surface of the Steinfeld.

The river bed below the so-called "Dunkelstein Weir" in the municipality of Ternitz usually only carries water at times of snowmelt and during heavy rain. The water flows through several works channels through the town of Neunkirchen. Here it powers some small hydro plants.

At the Peisching Weir most of the water from the River Schwarza (maximum 7,000 litres per second (250 cu ft/s)) is fed into the Kehrbach canal, which, in turn, feeds the Wiener Neustadt Canal.

During heavy rainfall, snowmelt and storms, the Schwarza quickly swells into a raging torrent.

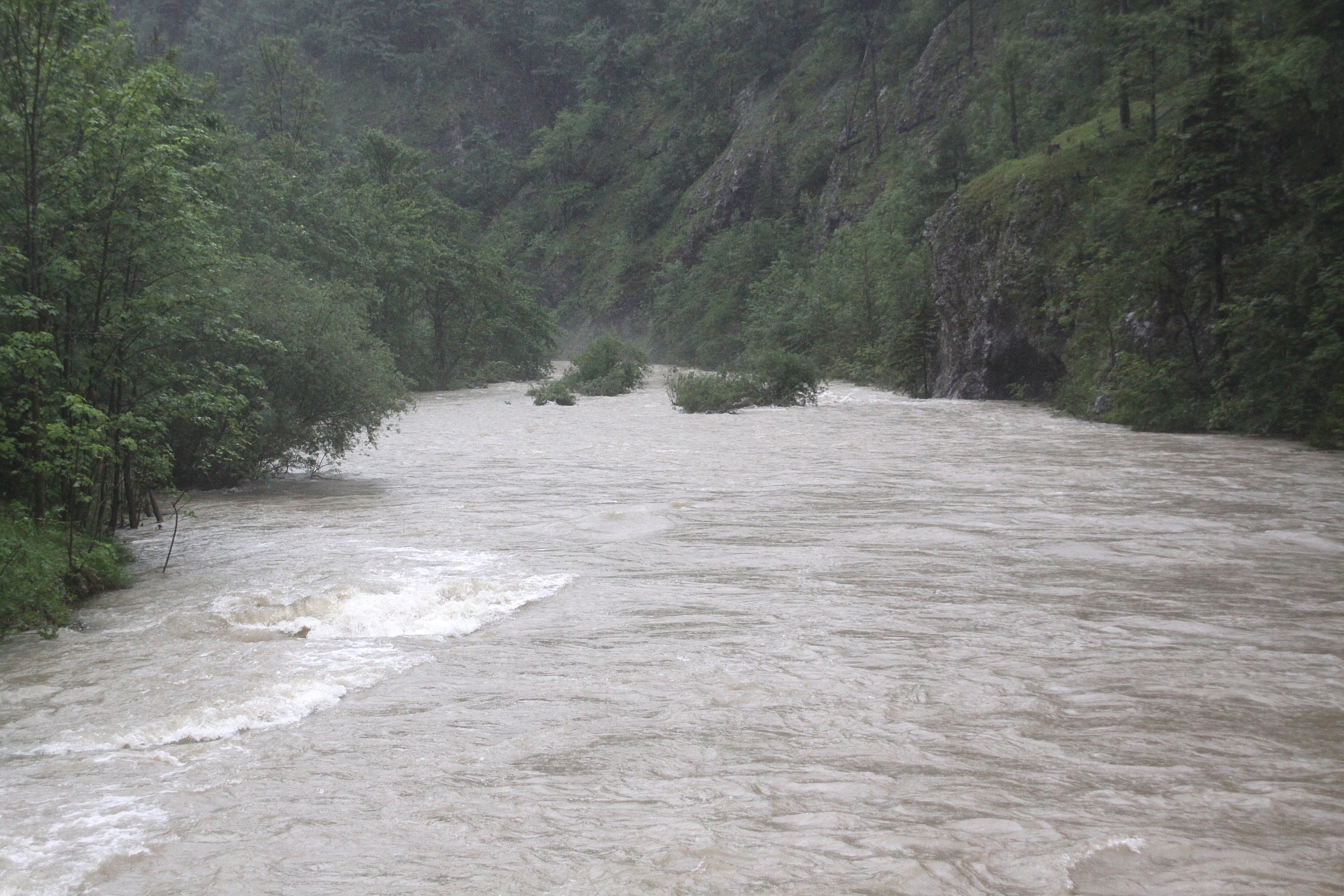
The Schwarza in spate in the Höllental

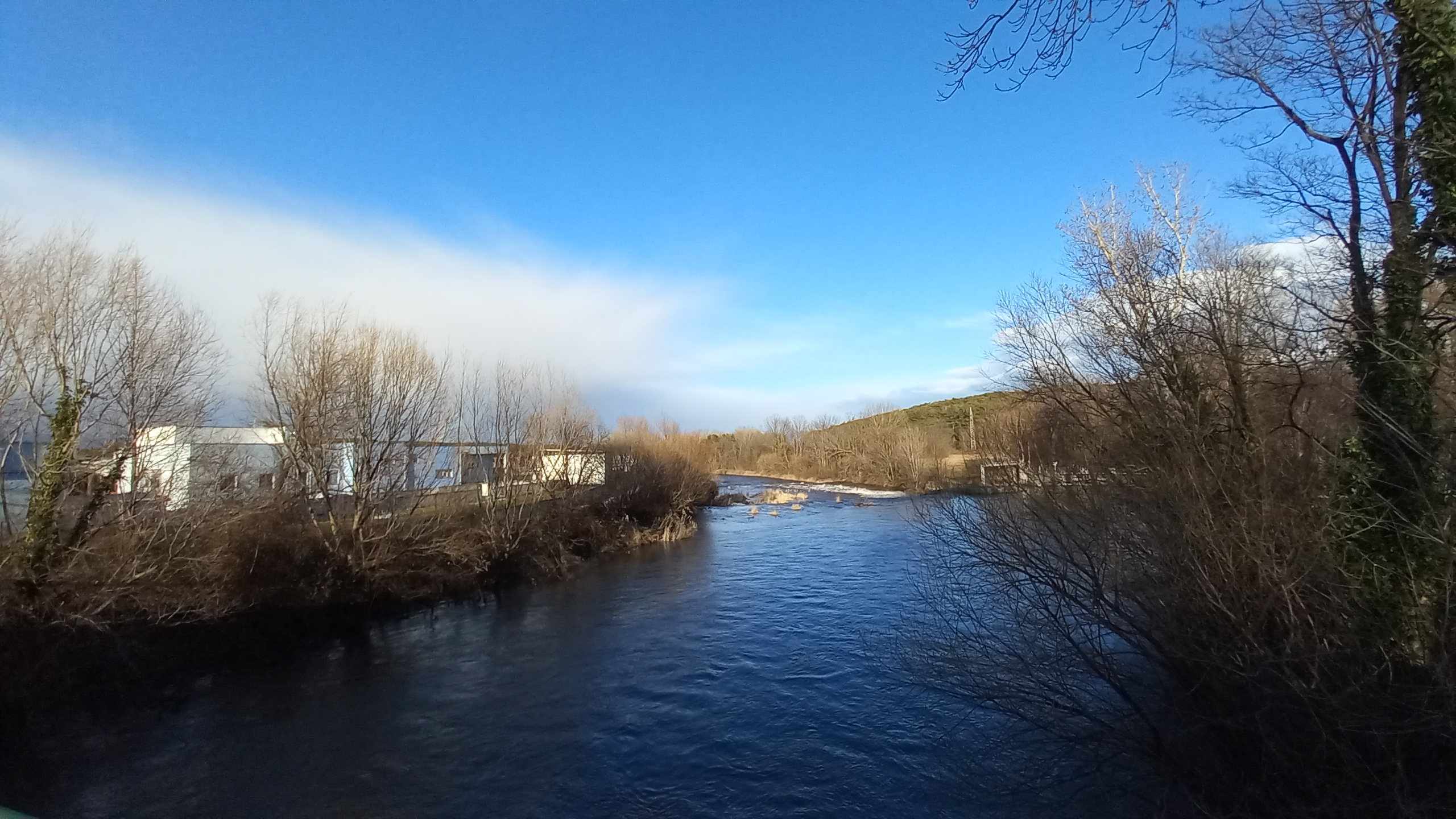
The Schwarza in Ternitz

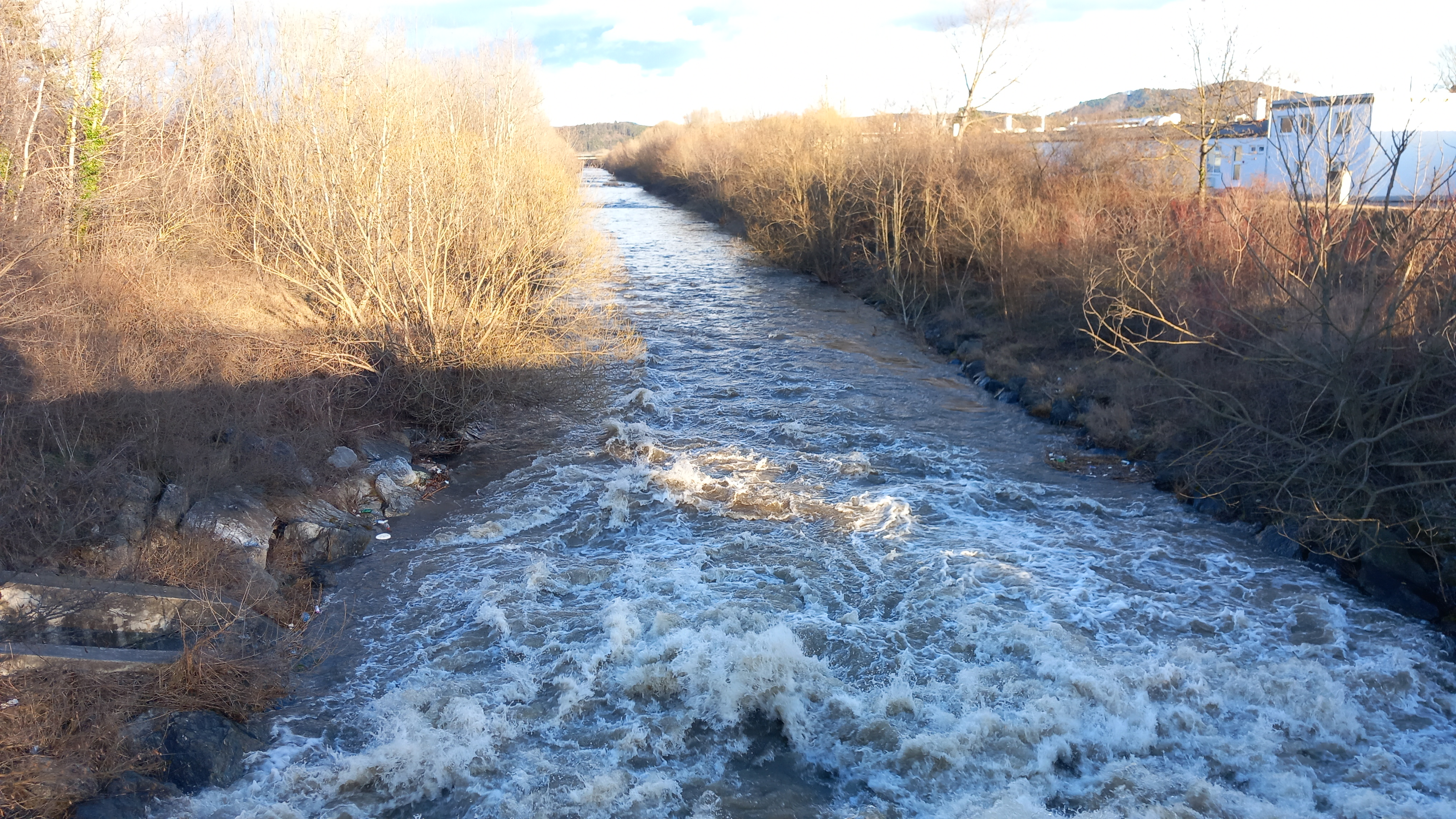
The Schwarza near Loipersbach

== Economic and transportation importance ==
Initially, the river was economically important for the timber industry. From 1803 wood from the forests on both sides of Schwarza was floated down the Schwarza and the Kehrbach to Wiener Neustadt and then loaded onto barges and transported to Vienna on the Wiener Neustadt Canal.

In earlier times, it was turned into charcoal in large kilns near the Wind Bridge. From the beginning to the middle of the 19th century numerous factories, especially paper mills, were established in the region.

The Schwarza is also used to generate electricity. For this purpose several works channels were built along the Schwarza, through which through most of the waters of the Schwarza now flow.

Of the once important paper mills, today only the company of Mayr-Melnhof Karton (MM Karton) in Hirschwang is still in operation. Numerous factory closures affected the working and social life of the region. For example, after the closure of the paper mill in Schlöglmühl, a television documentary was produced called Postadresse 2640 Schlöglmühl ("Postal Address 2640 Schlöglmühl") which portrayed the decline of the former paper industry.

The Höllental Road (B 27) follows the Schwarza valley throughout the upper parts of the river.

Water from the catchment area of the Schwarza has been used to supply drinking water to Vienna, since the 1st Viennese Spring Water Supply Network (1. Wiener Hochquellenwasserleitung) was built in 1869–1873.

== Natural region ==
Typical animal species for the Schwarza are the: otter, grey wagtail, grey heron, wallcreeper, white-throated dipper, grayling, brown trout and bullhead.

In the vicinity of the Schwarza near Kaiserbrunn (belongs to Reichenau an der Rax), it was switched from the conventional restocking of fish to supporting a natural supply of fishing stock. In particular, the stock of domestic brown trout is supported by "cocooning" and "artificial nests". The goal of this project is to build a native fish stock, capable of sustaining itself. In particular, the use of "artificial nests" (spawning beds are directly injected into the substrate) supports the natural supply of brown trout.
