= First Vienna Mountain Spring Pipeline =

Coordinates: 48.1383°N 16.2736°E

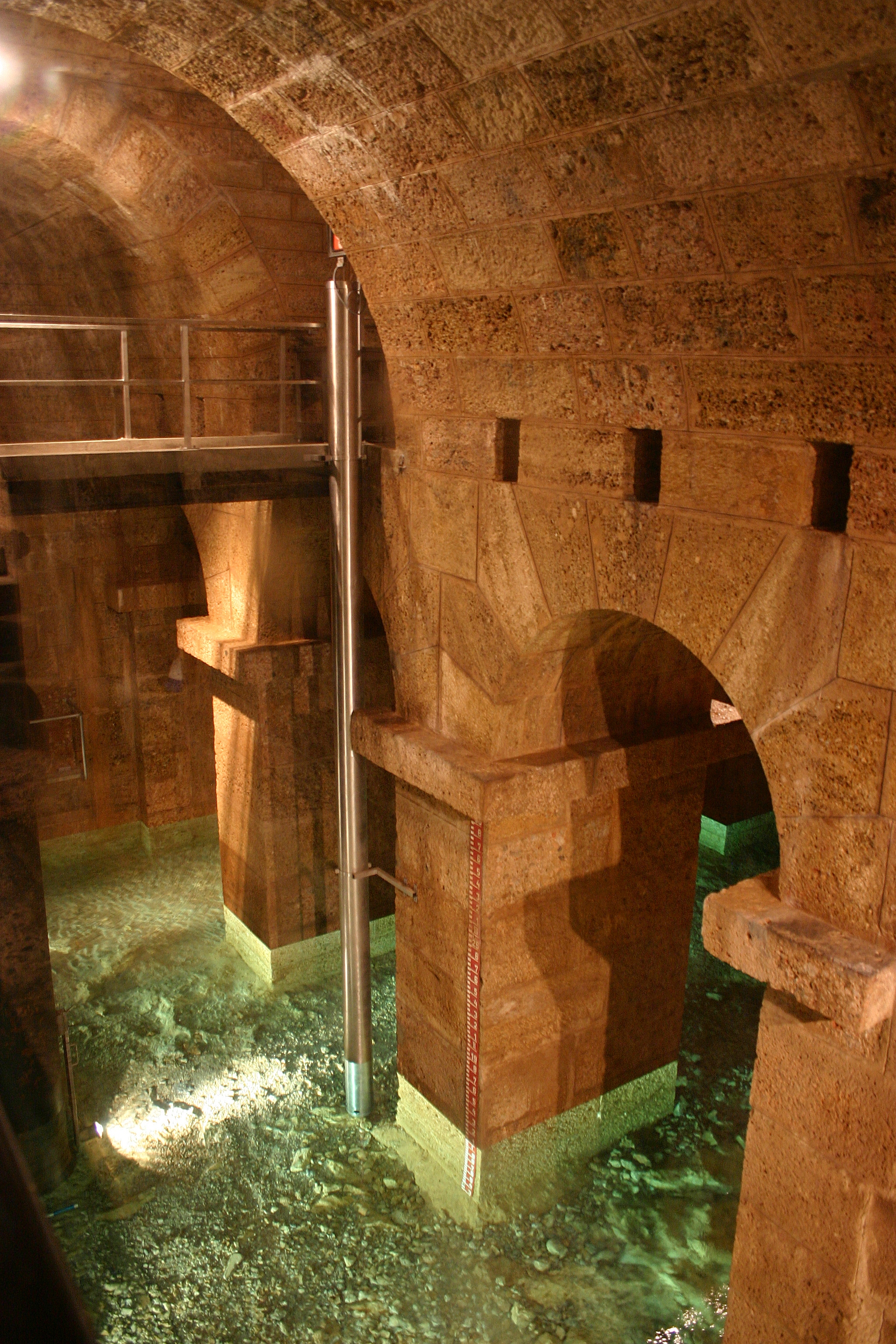
Inside the water tower at Kaiserbrunnen

The First Vienna Mountain Spring Pipeline (I. Wiener Hochquellenwasserleitung) is a major part of Vienna's water supply and was the first source of safe drinking water for the city. The 95 km long line was opened on 24 October 1873, after four years of construction. Today, it delivers 62 million cubic meters of water per year (53% of Vienna's total supply in 2007). The water comes from high springs in the Rax and Schneeberg areas in Southern Lower Austria and Styria.

== History ==
=== Beginnings to 1910 ===
==== The reason for its creation ====
Vienna's water supply originally came from private wells. In the absence of a functioning sewer system, the quality of the groundwater went from bad to worse, triggering disease and epidemics. Reinforced water pipes were built, but these primarily benefitted the wealthy and large institutions. Most of the population had to rely on spouts or fountains attached to wells.

The first water pipe that provided greater coverage was built in 1803-1804, bringing water from Hütteldorf. Vienna was growing too fast for the supply to be sufficient so, in 1836, the Emperor Ferdinand Aqueduct was built. It provided artificially filtered water from the Danube Canal. Initially, the water quality was acceptable, but the effects of the filtering gradually diminished and the health risk returned. Demand also continued to exceed supply.

During the late 1850s, several projects to divert water from other sources were proposed, and studies were made to calculate the amount of water that would be required. These studies considered not only drinking water, but industry, irrigation, road sprinkling, fountains and bathing facilities as well.

==== Search for a source ====
A primary consideration was that the water should originate at a high altitude, so that gravity, rather than pumps, would be sufficient to the task. The Traisen was considered first, and rejected, because of high water temperatures during the summer and concerns about its purity. The Pitten, Schwarza and the Leitha were subsequently rejected for similar reasons. The Fischa was rejected because of concerns about the companies that used the river as a power source and the possibility of contamination from ammonia-based fertilizers. Attention finally turned to the area between Rax, Schneeberg and Würflach.

The data collected from these studies were summarized by the City Planning Authority and presented to the City Council on 31 July 1861. Later, on 1 December 1861, foreign and domestic engineering companies were invited to submit plans and bids for the proposed project. Twelve offers were presented and various sources were suggested; two of which focused on the Rax-Schneeberg area.

==== Establishment of the Water Supply Commission ====
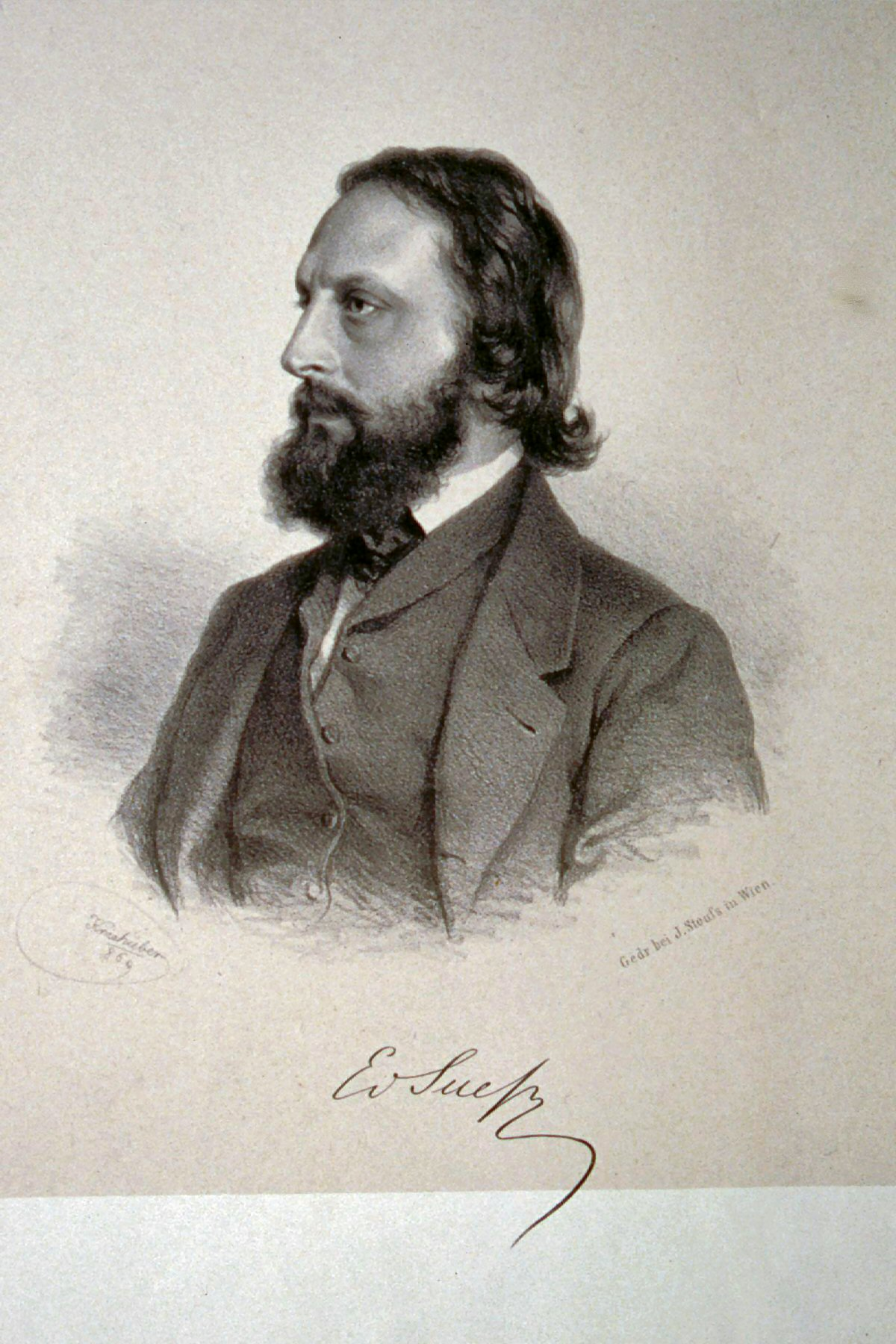
Eduard Suess

On 21 November 1862, the City Council established a twelve-member commission to carry out the necessary surveys and paperwork. Among the commission's members were Cajetan Felder (an entomologist), Ludwig Förster (an architect) and August Zang (a publisher). Eduard Suess (a geologist) was appointed to replace Förster upon the latter's death in 1863. In the spring of that year, the commission began a detailed examination of the proposed sites and projects. Their studies extended higher and higher, finally examining the area around Höllental, which they declared to be suitable for the project's purposes.

The final "Report on the surveys of the Water Supply Commission of the Municipal Council of the City of Vienna" was written by Suess in 1864 and published by the Council. The report concluded that the three sources of Kaiserbrunnen, Stixenstein and Alta would supply high quality water and, even though it was longer than the route to Fischa, would be more cost-effective because no pump station would be necessary. The report was submitted to a group of experts and verified on 6 July 1864. The Imperial Society of Physicians gave their support to the final proposal and it was ratified by the Council on 12 July by a vote of 94 to 2.

==== The beginning of detailed planning ====
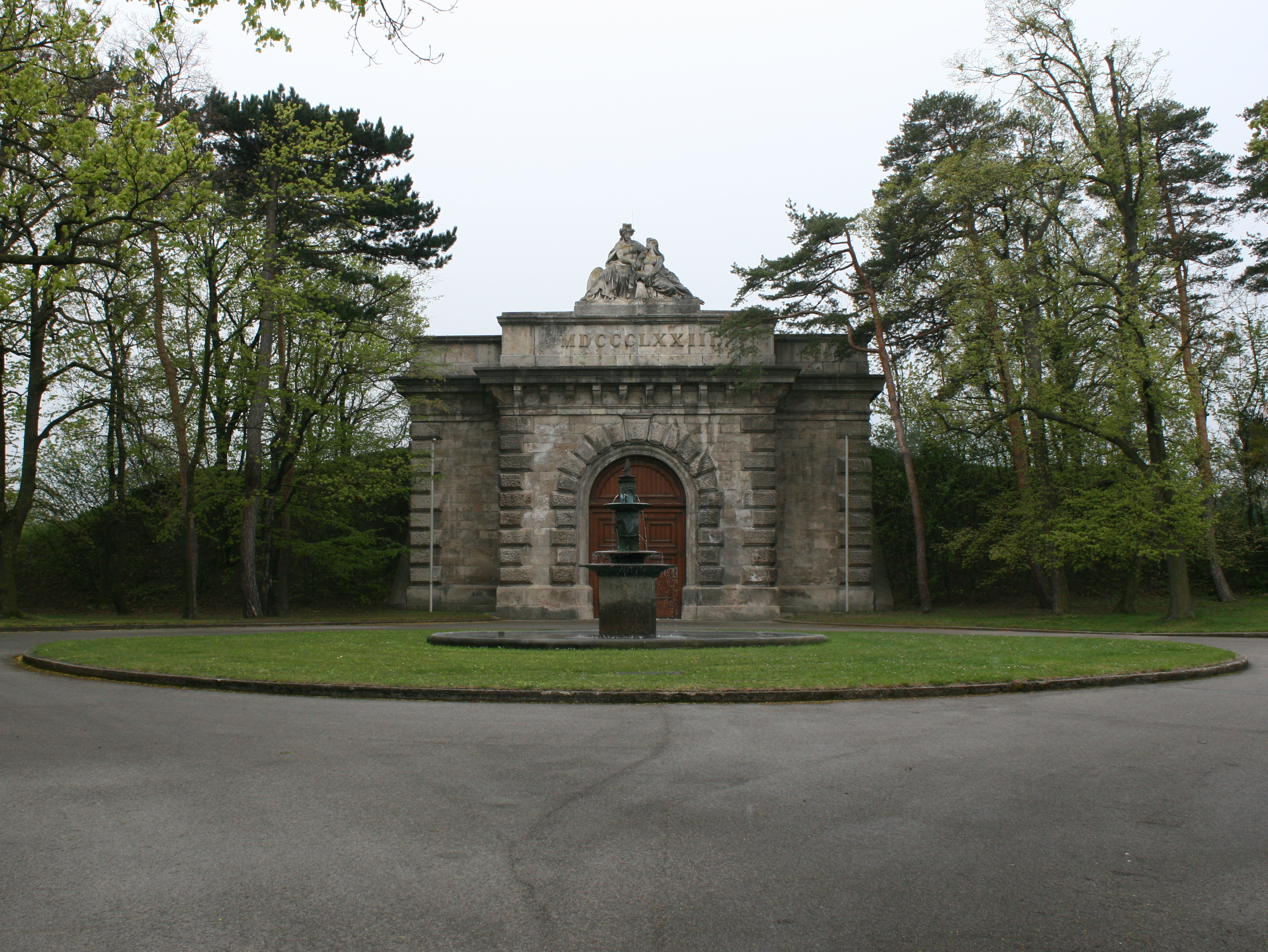
The reservoir at Rosenhügel

Those involved in the planning were divided in two groups. The First Department was responsible for the source of the pipeline and the reservoir. The Second Department oversaw the pipeline route and work within the Vienna city limits. The work was done under the direction of Carl Junker, a civil engineer, and Karl Gabriel, the City Engineer.

The plans were completed near the end of October in 1865 and put on public display at the Palais Augarten in December. Another panel of experts examined the plans and gave their approval in February, 1866. On May 25 that year, the plans were presented to the City Council for final approval and after a long debate, the project was authorized to proceed on 19 June. Having fulfilled the tasks assigned to it, the original Water Supply Commission was dissolved on 3 July and replaced by a new twenty-one member commission to oversee the actual construction. Most of the original commissioners were retained.

The first construction permits were issued in July 1868. Objections were raised by local land owners and factory operators near the Schwarza, but were rejected by the Ministry of the Interior on 22 March 1869.

==== Acquisition of sources ====
===== Stixenstein =====
The Stixenstein source, near the Schloss Stixenstein at Sieding was owned by Count Ernst Karl von Hoyos-Sprinzenstein. The city of Vienna had notified him that they intended to acquire the property by right of public domain as early as 27 July 1864. Although he presented several conditions, none were considered onerous and the contract was approved by the Regional Court on 11 August 1868. In return for his "donation" he was made an Honorary Citizen of Vienna in 1873.

===== Kaiserbrunnen =====
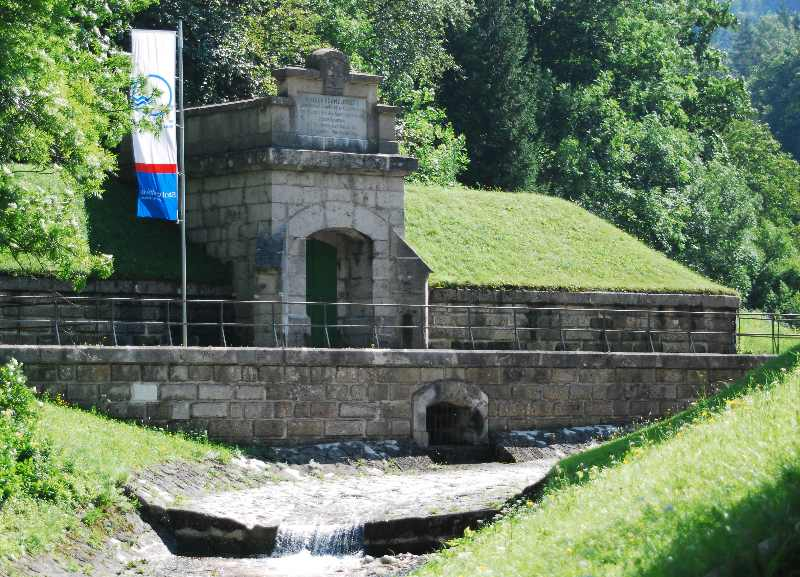
The water tower at Kaiserbrunnen

On 12 July 1864, a Delegation requested an audience with Emperor Franz Joseph I to request that he graciously transfer his interests in the Kaiserbrunnen to the City of Vienna.

On 1 May 1865, at the opening ceremonies for the Ringstraße, the Emperor declared that he would present the Kaiserbrunnen to the city as a gift. The Ministry of Finance, however, made demands for indemnification and negotiations ensued. A decision on 29 November 1867 was followed by another audience with the Emperor, followed by more negotiations, which led to a contract being signed on 6 March 1868.

==== Construction of the first tunnel ====
After the issuance of construction permits, the bids were examined and the contract awarded to Antonio Gabrielli, a contractor from London, on 12 October 1869.

The construction officially began on 21 April 1870. The Emperor himself turned over the first spadeful of dirt at Rosenhügel. In fact, construction had started on 6 December 1869, with blasting for the tunnel at Höllental. Due to some initial difficulties, the proposed completion date was re-estimated to be July, 1874. Gabrielli had awarded individual segments of the project to sub-contractor. The tunnel work had been given to Franz Schlögl, a Viennese architect, who was not up to the task and was removed from the project in August, 1870.

Falling further behind from delays in deliveries, Gabrielli turned to the Minister of War to help with the tunnel but, instead of the 250 men he requested, he was assigned only 70 sappers. After an intervention by the City of Vienna, the War Ministry sent more men and the last tunnel section was completed on 8 December 1872.

==== Construction in Vienna ====
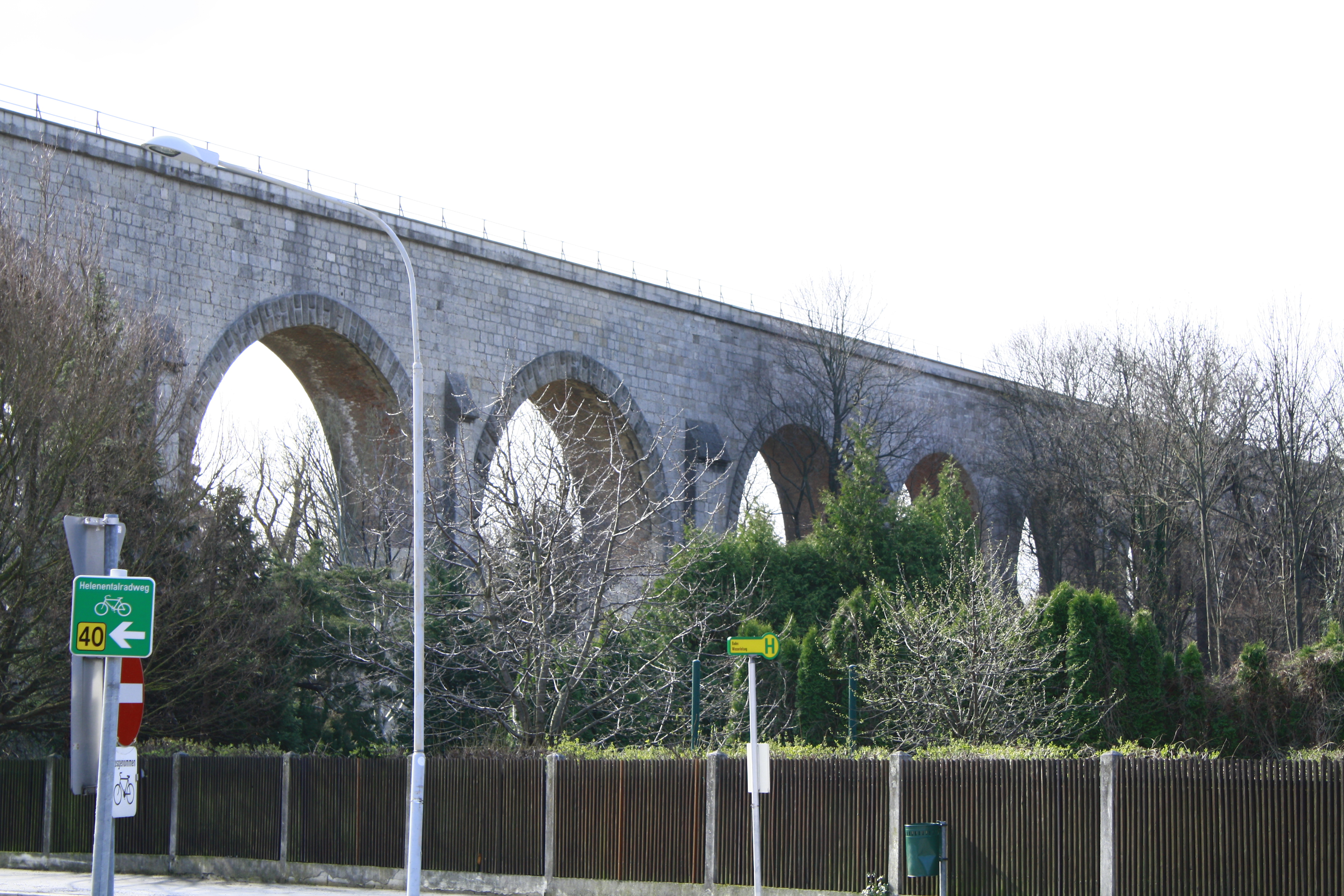
Baden Aqueduct south of Helenenstraße

On 5 April 1870, the City Council approved a proposal by the Water Supply Commission and designated three companies to supply the pipes needed in urban areas. These were: the Prager Eisenindustrie-Gesellschaft (located in Kladno), Gambier et Cie. (from La Louvière, Belgium) and the Neuberg-Mariazeller Gewerkschaft. However, Gambier encountered difficulties in delivering their pipes due to the Franco-Prussian War, so most of their contract was transferred to nearby factories in Moravia. Many of the pipes were tested after being laid and were not up to standards, so the thickness of the pipe walls was increased and the general plan was revised to prevent water pressure from being too high in the low-lying areas.

Due to a lack of water in 1873, Gabrielli was asked to accelerate his work so the supplies could be increased by no later than October. The City Council approved a special payment for this purpose. Construction was largely completed by August. The highlight of the opening ceremony on 24 October 1873 was the dedication of a jet fountain on the Schwarzenbergplatz by the Emperor.

The entire pipe network, however, was not completed until July 1874. Private wells were examined for potential health hazards and, if any were found, the residences they served had to be connected to the new system and the old wells closed. By 1883, 80% of the homes in Vienna were receiving their water from the new pipes. By 1888, this had increased to 91%. Due to an increase in population, a pumping station had to be added at Breitensee in 1896. By 1899, another pumping station had been added on the Wienerbergstraße. In 1908 and 1909, the city found itself facing shortages again and, despite some opposition from industrial interests, took stop-gap measures to insure an adequate drinking water supply until the Second Vienna Mountain Spring Pipeline could be completed.

=== From 1910 to 1938 ===
Map of the Vienna Mountain Spring Pipelines

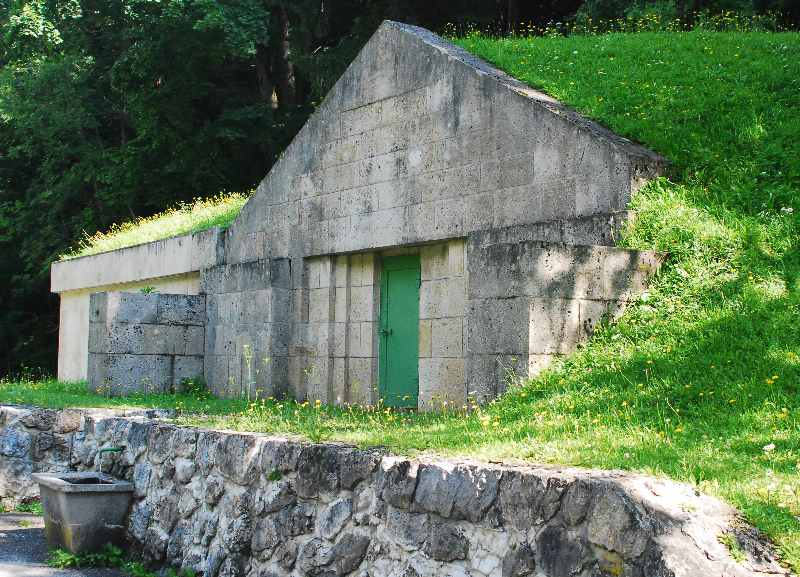
The metering chamber at Kaiserbrunn

After the opening of the second pipeline in 1910, further investment in the first pipeline no longer seemed necessary.

On 25 July 1914, during the First World War, both pipelines became state-protected companies by Imperial Decree. As a result, monitoring of the lines, which was normally undertaken by city employees and volunteers, became the responsibility of the Landsturm.

After the war, the population of Vienna decreased by almost 326,000 and the ensuing economic depression reduced economic activity so the city found itself with a surplus of water that was delivered to adjacent communities such as Klosterneuburg, Schwechat, Brunn am Gebirge and others. But, during the summers of 1928 and 1929, the area experienced a drought, once again forcing a search for new sources of water. A temporary pumping station was established on the Naßbach, near its confluence with the Preinbach, but this water had to be chlorinated. That pump was eventually replaced by an electrically powered pump at the pipeline's headwaters. In 1930, improvements were made to the source at Kaiserbrunnen, including a "metering chamber" that would provide precise measurements of water flow.

=== 1938 to 1945 ===
Water consumption in Vienna rose sharply after 1939, slowing down only towards the end of 1944. By 1942, demand had exceeded supply. In the event that one of the lines might become disabled, groundwater stations and locks were built in the urban area. Water saving measures were, of course, already in effect as a result of the war.

On 12 April 1944 an attack on the nearby airbase at Kottingbrunn caused collateral damage to the first pipeline. Far more serious were the results of an attack at Wöllersdorf in May, which damaged the line in several places. Bombing near Vienna caused damage to the aqueduct. Temporary repairs were attempted, often by local fire brigades. On 29 March 1945, a bombing raid by Russian aircraft caused severe damage at Neunkirchen. This remained unrepaired until after the war.

=== 1945 until today ===
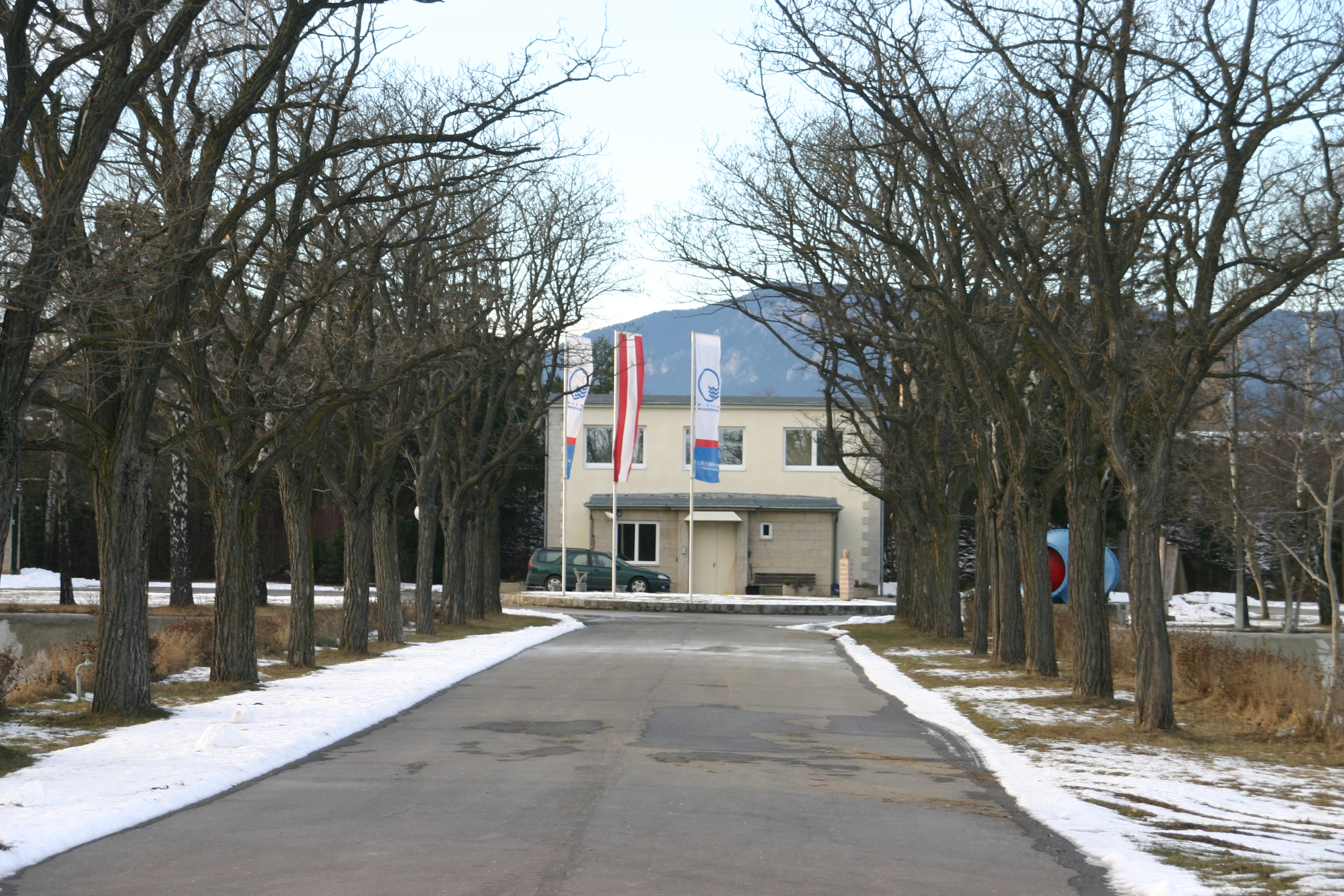
The site of the water tank at Neusiedl am Steinfeld

The bomb craters near Neunkirchen had allowed large quantities of gravel to enter the system, causing erosion to the pipes. Cleaning and repair required several years, during which the canal had to be closed.

The first major project after the pipeline was recommissioned was the construction of a major water storage facility at Neusiedl am Steinfeld. The foundation stone was laid on 21 November 1953 and the four-chambered water tank was fully operational by 25 April 1959. It can hold 150,000 cubic metres of water, making it the largest in Europe at that time.

A few years later, another problem was posed by the construction of the Süd Autobahn (1961-1963), which crosses the first pipeline four times between Bad Vöslau and Bad Fischau. Precautions had to be taken to protect the pipeline from the potential effects of traffic accidents.

With the establishment of the Schneealpenstollen (Alpine Snow Tunnel) in 1968, water from Styria was introduced into the pipeline system. The tunnel was then the largest in Europe and increased supplies by 20%. Two more such tunnels, the Scheiblingstollen and the Lärchsteinstollen, have been built, bringing water from the Hochschwab range.

== Waterpipe Museum, Kaiserbrunnen ==
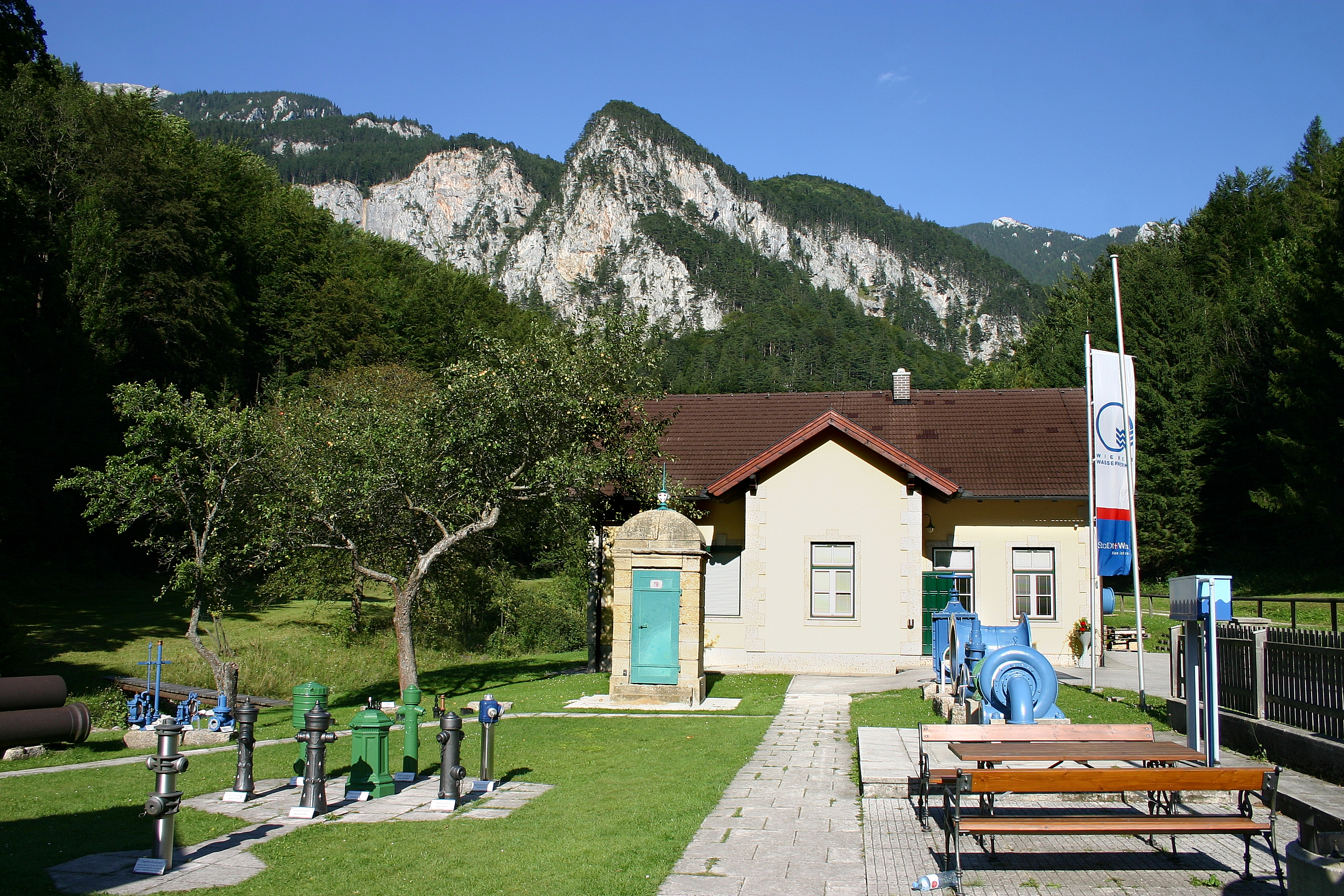
The Waterpipe Museum in 1998

A former forest warden's house in Kaiserbrunnen has served since 1973 as a museum, consisting of two buildings with seven rooms documenting the construction of the First Vienna Mountain Spring Pipeline. The museum was expanded in 1998 and has 950 objects, several informational displays and video presentations.
