= Höllental (Lower Austria) =

Valley in Austria

Coordinates: 47°44′54″N 15°46′08″E

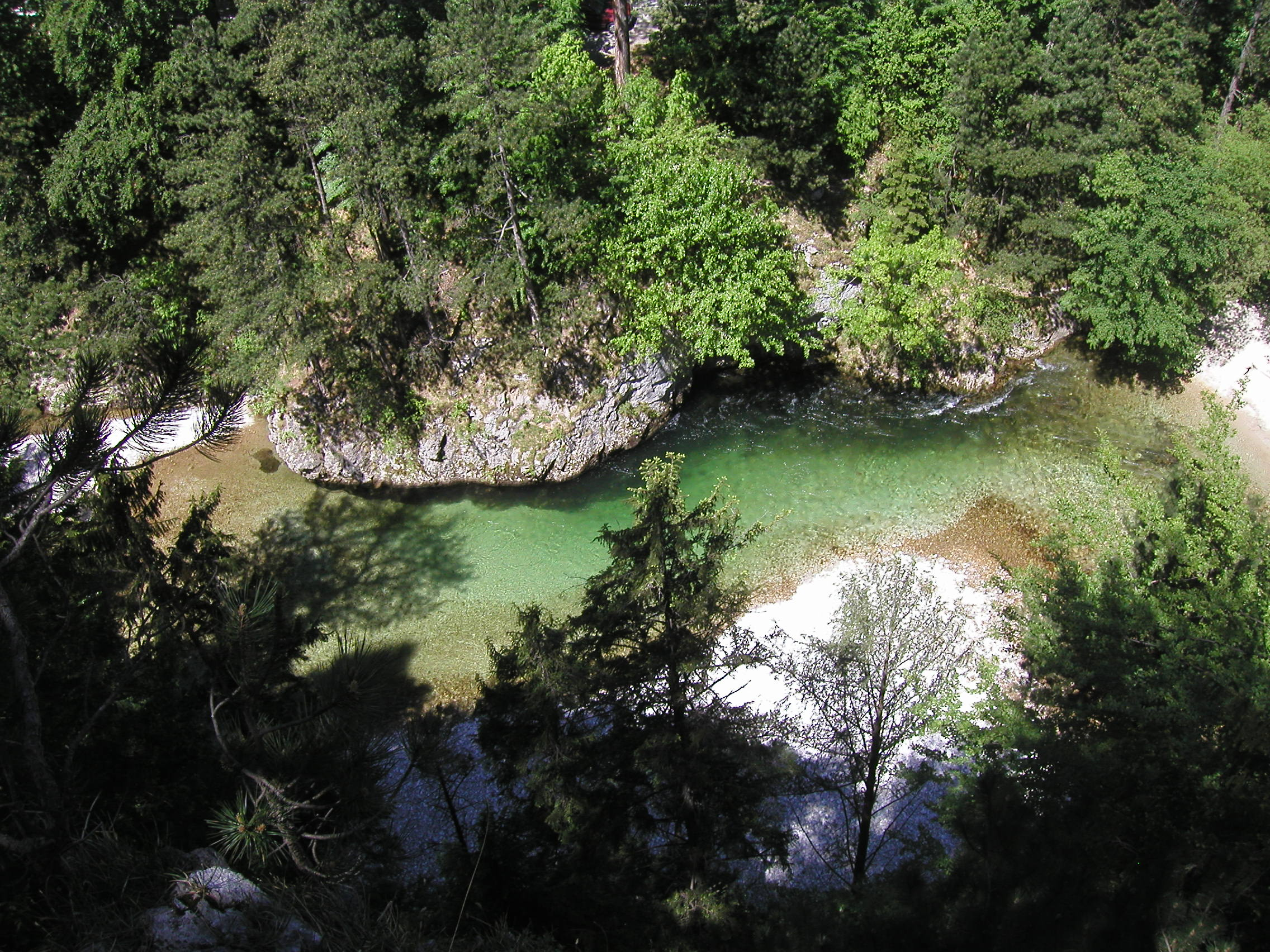
The Höllental

The Höllental (German pronunciation: [ˈhœlənˌtaːl], lit. 'Hell's Valley') in Lower Austria is a narrow valley between the steep limestone massifs of the Schneeberg and Rax through which the River Schwarza flows.

It stretches for a total of 16.5 km between Schwarzau im Gebirge and Hirschwang and, because of its natural beauty, it belongs to the Natura 2000 region of Northeastern Border Alps: Hohe Wand - Schneeberg - Rax (Nordöstliche Randalpen: Hohe Wand - Schneeberg - Rax). It biggest side valleys are the Weich valley, the Großes Höllental (which is much smaller however), the Kesselgraben, the Nasswald and Voisbach valleys. A well-developed road, the Höllental Straße (B 27), follows the course of the river and is especially popular with motorcyclists. In the valley and its side valleys are important sources of drinking water supply (The Fuchs Pass Spring, Kaiserbrunn and Wasseralm Spring), whose water is delivered to the Austria's capital city of Vienna over the First Vienna Mountain Spring Pipeline (I. Wiener Hochquellenwasserleitung). On the occasion of the 125th anniversary of the pipeline, the so-called 1st Viennese Pipeline Way (1. Wiener Wasserleitungsweg) was built along the most attractive sections of the route, which runs as a walking trail between Kaiserbrunn and Hirschwang. The Kaiserbrunn Water Pipeline Museum has information on the history and construction of the pipeline and Vienna's water supply.

Because the valley is a popular tourist destination, there are several restaurants along the road. In Naßwald there are the Gasthof zur Singerin and the Weichtalhaus at the start of the Weich valley, and in Kaiserbrunn is the Landgasthof Kaiserbrunn. The Höllental is the start point for Alpine tours to the Schneeberg and Rax mountains. The Schwarza is used in this area for swimming and wild water kayaking and for fly fishing.

There is a public bus line through the Höllental from Rohr im Gebirge and Schwarzau im Gebirge to the station at Payerbach-Reichenau, that runs several times daily in both directions. In addition the Höllental Railway runs on summer weekends from the Semmering Railway to the beginning of the Höllental.

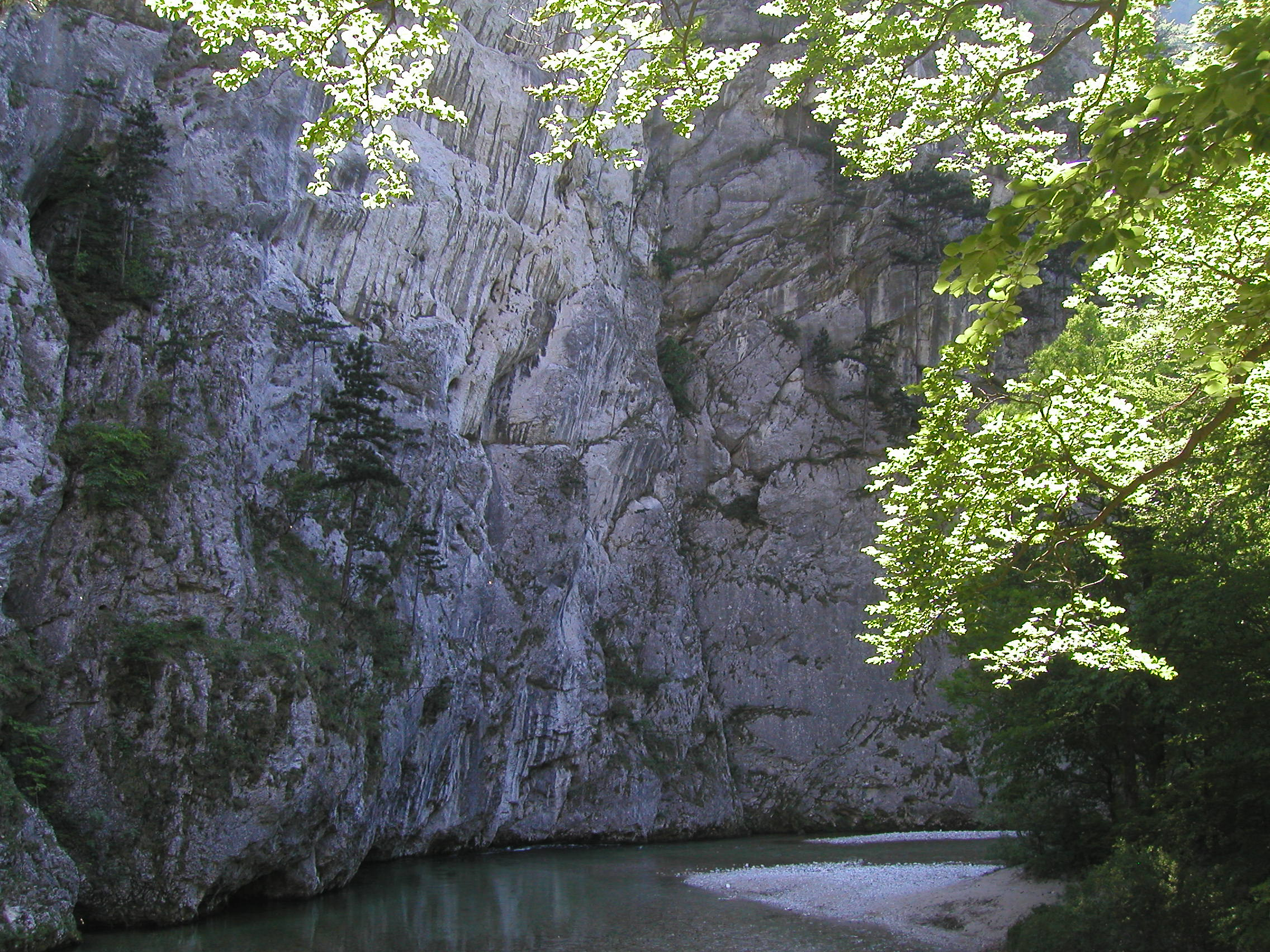
The Höllental: rock wall near the Rechen bridge

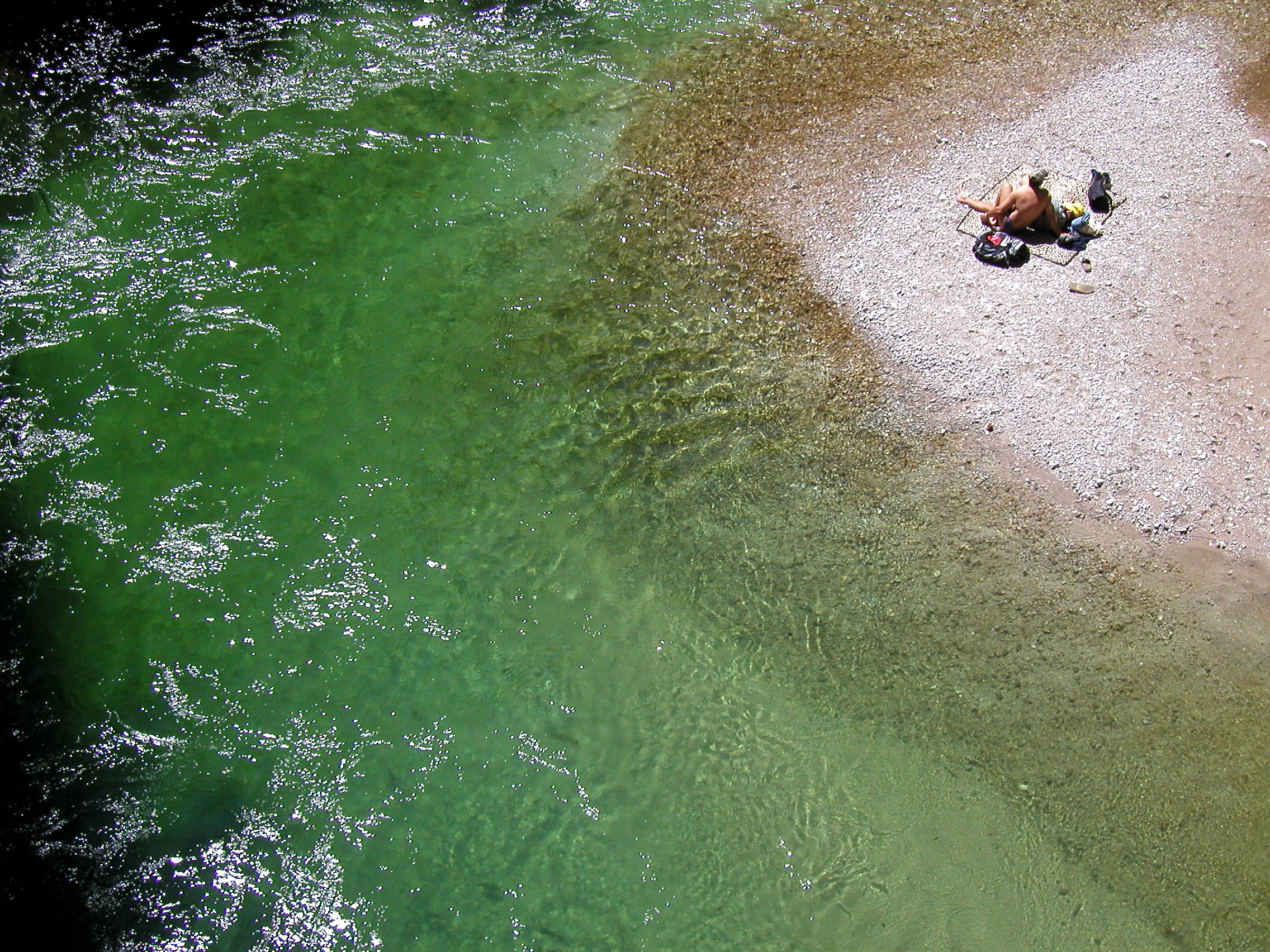
The Höllental: gravel bank on the Schwarza

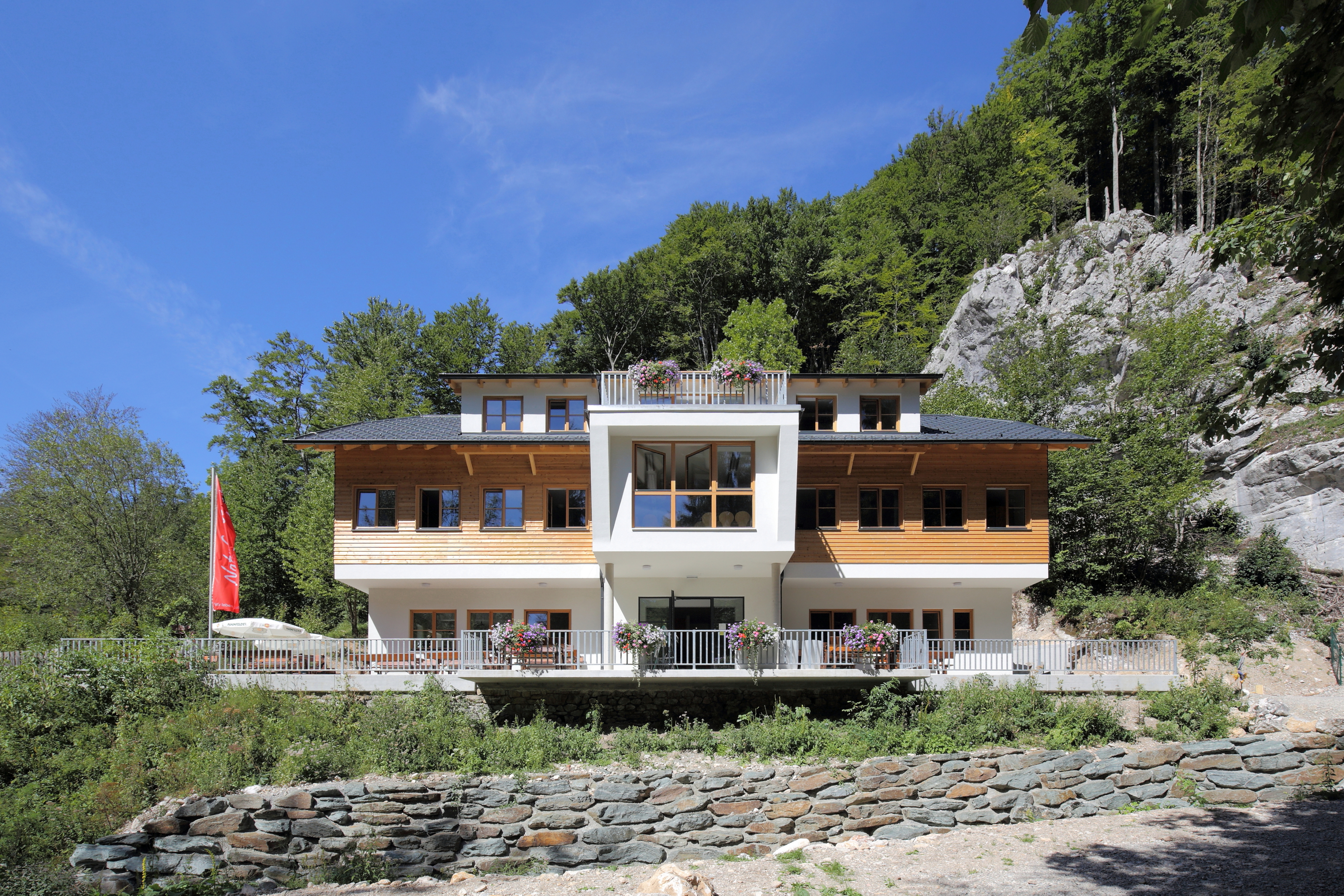
The new Weichtalhaus at the start of the Weichtalklamm gorge (563 m (AA))
