= Klostertaler Gscheid =

Mountain pass in Lower Austria

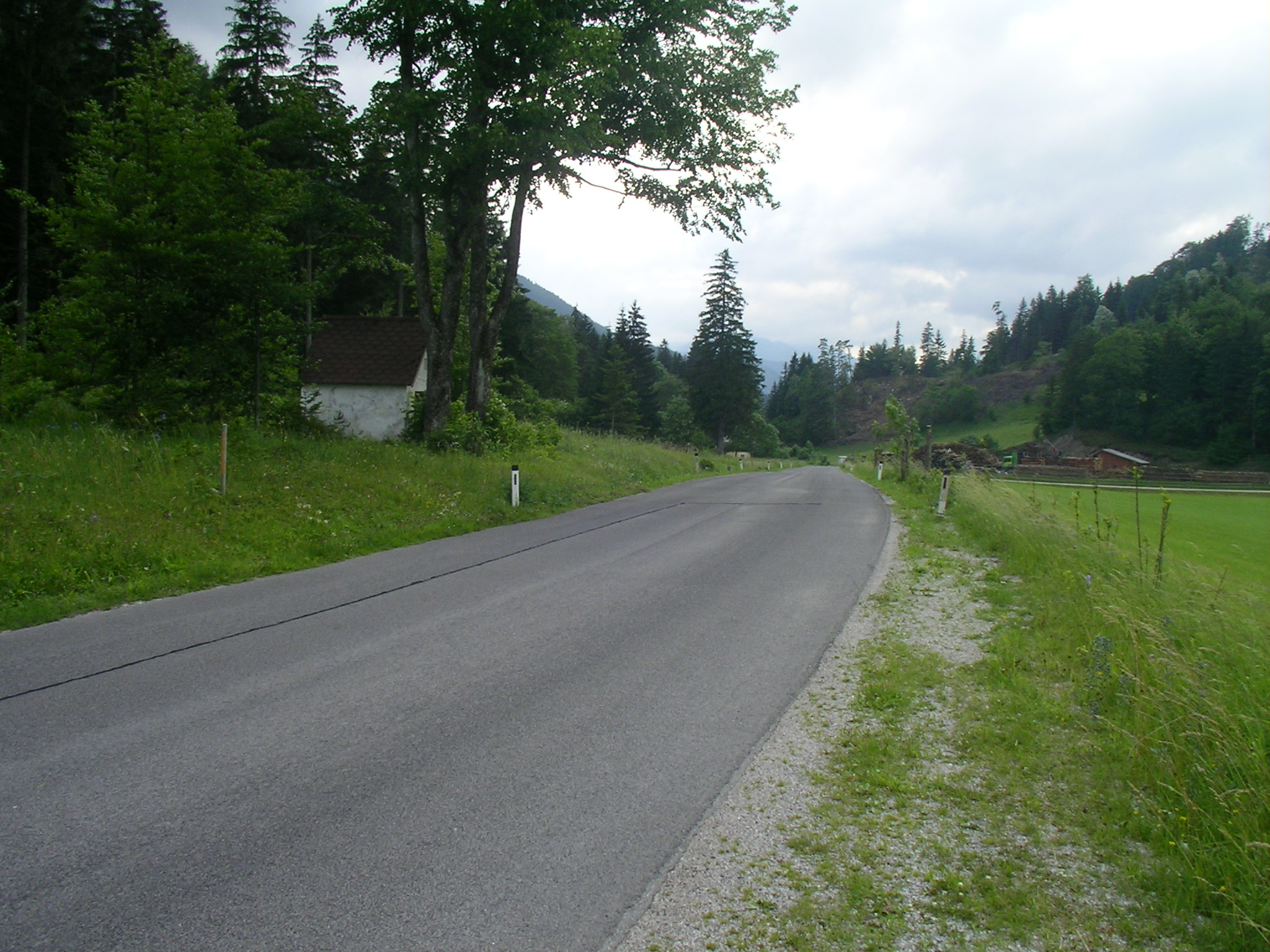
- Klostertaler Gscheid with Chapel

- Location within Alps
- Elevation: 764 metres (2,507 ft)
- Traversed by: Road

Third Approach
- Location: Austria
- Coordinates: 47°48′36″N 15°48′01″E

The Klostertaler Gscheid is a 764 m (AA) high mountain pass in southern Lower Austria, which links the Klostertal valley (municipality of Gutenstein) with the valley of the River Voisbach (municipality of Schwarzau im Gebirge). At the summit of the pass is a small chapel. The tarmac state road Landesstraße 137 runs over the pass. The road runs from northeast to southwest along the northern slopes of the Schneeberg. Because of the sparse population of the region the pass only is only of local significance. It is not closed in winter.

== See also ==
- List of highest paved roads in Europe
- List of mountain passes
