= Hasenleiten Parish Church =

Church building in Vienna, Austria

Coordinates: 48.1647°N 16.418°E

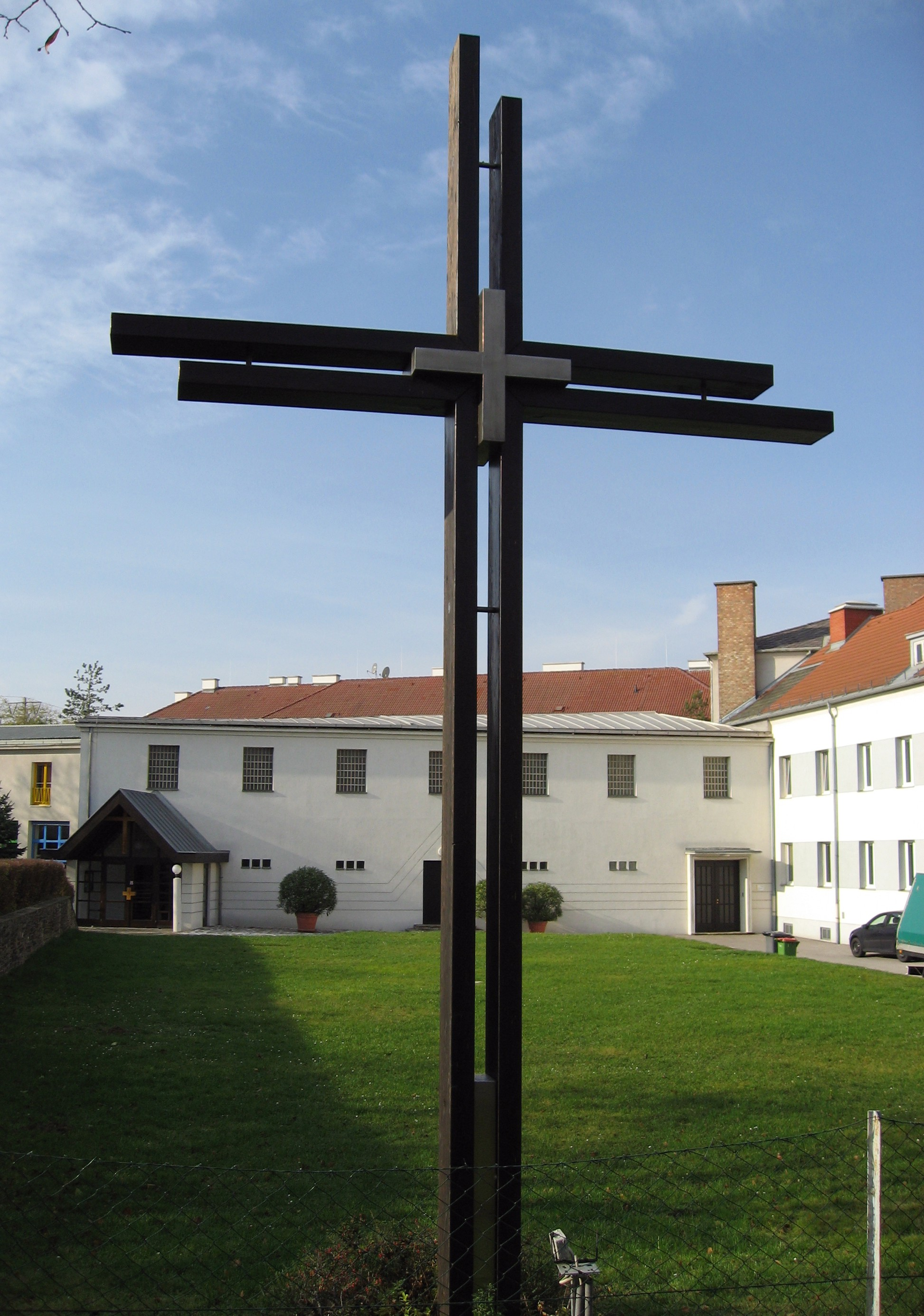
Hasenleiten Parish Church, viewed from the Hasenleitengasse street

The Filial Church Hasenleiten (German: Filialkirche Hasenleiten or Filialkirche Zum Göttlichen Kinderfreund) is one of the Roman Catholic churches in Vienna's 11th district of Simmering dedicated to St. John Maria Vianney, and is a listed monument.

On April 1, 2018, the parish of Hasenleiten was merged with the parishes of Neusimmering and St. Luke (German: Pfarrkirche Neusimmering and Pfarrkirche St. Lukas) to form the Parish of the Divine Love (German: Pfarre zur Göttlichen Liebe). Since then, the Parish Church Hasenleiten has been a Filial Church of the Parish of Divine Love, and a church of the subparish of Hasenleiten.

== "Emergency Church" ==
During World War I, the Vienna Military Hospital No. VI was located in the triangle between Hasenleitengasse - Am Kanal (former the Wiener Neustadt Canal parallel to the Aspangbahn). The barracks hospital, planned for 4,500 patients and built in 1915, included a church and was very overcrowded towards the end of the war. The intermediate walls were installed in the barracks after the war, as part of the buildings' conversion into a homeless shelter. Later, the Hasenleiten Residential Area (Wohnsiedlung Hasenleiten) was built on the site.

The church of the military hospital, made of wood in the style of Russian village churches, was built out of prefabricated components donated by a Polish company. It had a slender wooden tower, and was blessed by military curator Karl Rudolf on November 1, 1915. Following the barracks' post-war tenure as an emergency homeless shelter, the church was left deserted and devastated. However, in 1926, the Jesuit Father Peter Paul Pohl and other several men reestablished the church, and services were resumed. Several Jesuit Fathers managed the church from 1927-1934, at which point Konrad Thurnher arrived as a permanent pastor. In 1942 under Thurnher the sawbuilding area of Hasenleiten, which belonged to the Parish of St. Laurenz (Pfarre St. Laurenz) and the Parish Church of Altsimmering (German: Pfarrkirche Altsimmering), was given its own parish council, and on January 1, 1944 the area became an independent parish.

On December 19, 1959, the former military curate of Karl Rudolf, then a prelate in St. Stephan's Cathedral (Stephansdom), held the last mass in the barracks church. The barracks church was subsequently demolished.

== Present-day Church ==
Under Thurnher, a plot of land for a new church had been acquired on the southern edge of Hasenleiten. His successors, Reverends Josef Erbher and Anton Haselhofer, continued the project to its conclusion. The new parish church was designed and built by architect Ladislaus Hruska between 1953 and 1959. It was consecrated on December 20, 1959 by Archbishop Cardinal Franz König as the first and only church dedicated to St. John Maria Viannay, the parish priest of Ars.

== Pastors and Priests ==
- 1915–1918: Karl Rudolf
- 1926–1934: Peter Paul Pohl and other Jesuits
- 1934–1951: Konrad Thurnher (1885–1951), a priest from Dornbirn, voluntarily went along with Josef Gorbach in order to be available for the pastoral care of workers in Vienna
- 1952–1957: Josef Erber
- 1957–1962: Anton Haselhofer
- 1963–2000: Anton Stilling (1931–2000)
- 2001–2015: Peter Hryckiewicz
- Since 2015: P. Mag. Jan Soroka, C.R.

In 1956 the Konrad-Thurnher-Gasse in Simmering was named after Pastor Thurnher.

In 2002 the Anton Stilling Square in Simmering was named after the priest Anton Stilling, the pastor of Hasenleiten. Pastor Stilling was a member of the Catholic secondary school association K.Ö.St.V. Vandalia Wien and the Catholic university association K.a.V. Danubia Wien-Korneuburg.
