= Barrande =

Barrande is a French surname, and it may refer to:

- Joachim Barrande (1799, Saugues –1883, Frohsdorf, Lanzenkirchen), a French-Czech geologist and palaeontologist
  - 5958 Barrande, a main-belt asteroid named after Joachim Barrande
  - German: Barrandium (Czech: Barrandien)
  - Barrandov
