= Majosháza =

- Coat of arms

- Location of Majosháza in Hungary
- Coordinates: 47.26238°N 19.00153°E
- Country: Hungary
- Region: Central Hungary
- County: Pest
- Subregion: Ráckevei
- Rank: Village

Area
  - Total: 11.42 km^{2} (4.41 sq mi)

Population (1 January 2008)
  - Total: 1,416
  - Density: 124.0/km^{2} (321.1/sq mi)
- Time zone: UTC+1 (CET)
  - Summer (DST): UTC+2 (CEST)
- Postal code: 2339
- Area code: +36 24
- KSH code: 10755
- Website: www.majoshaza.hu

Majosháza is a village in Pest county, Budapest metropolitan area, Hungary. It has a population of 1,365 (2007).

== Twin towns - twin cities ==
- Aita Medie – Romania
- Selice – Slovakia
- Sremska Kamenica – Serbia
- Ternitz – Austria
