= Pitten (river) =

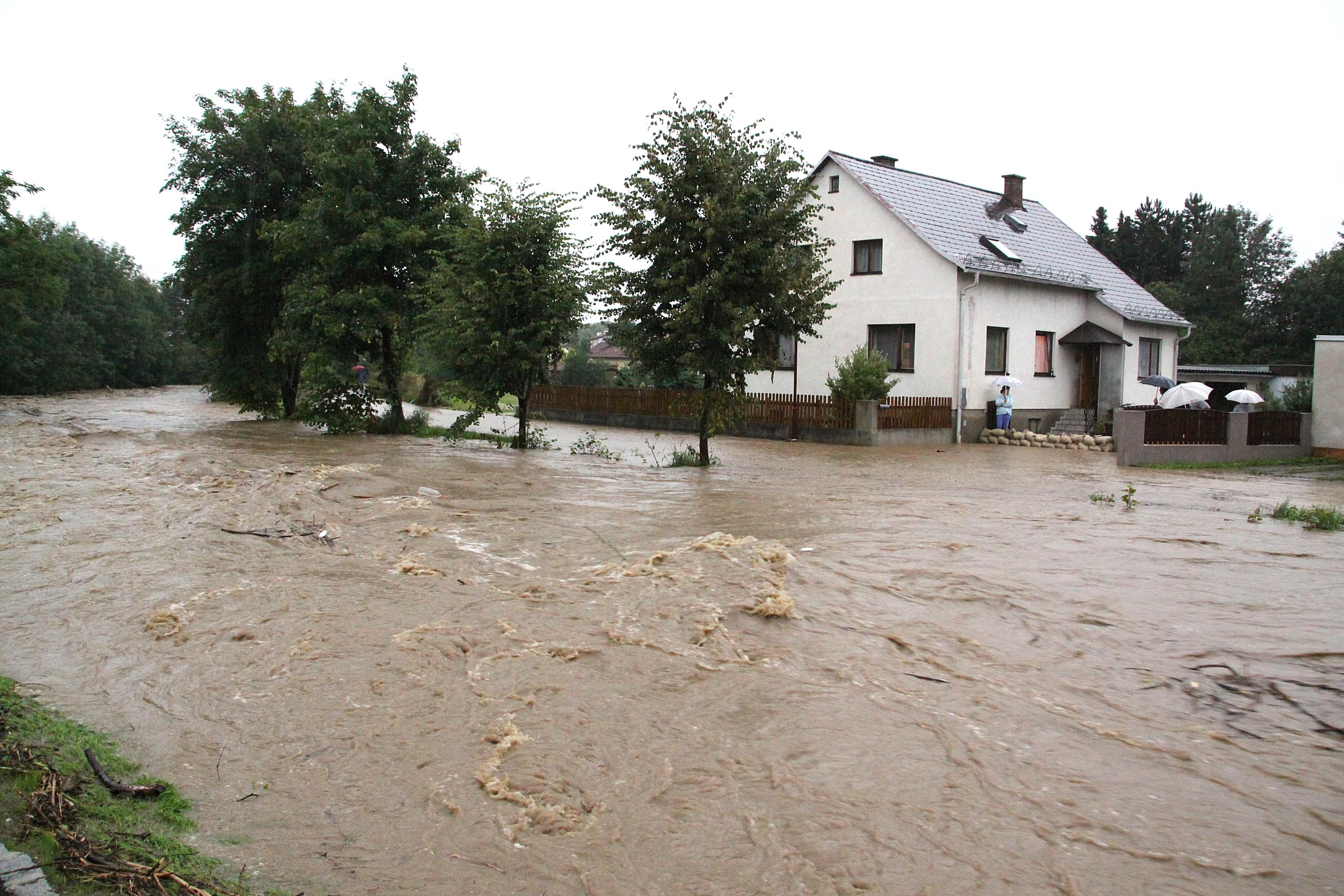
- The Pitten in a flood at Pitten

Location
- Country: Austria
- State: Lower Austria

Physical characteristics
- Source
  - location: confluence of the Feistritz and the Großer Pestingbach near Hinterleiten, Feistritz am Wechsel)
  - coordinates: 47.5869°N 16.1001°E
- Mouth
  - location: confluence of the Pitten and the Schwarza at Haderswörth in the parish of Lanzenkirchen
  - coordinates: 47.7350°N 16.2247°E
- Basin size: 413 km^{2} (159 sq mi)

Basin features
- Progression: Leitha→ Danube→ Black Sea

The Pitten is a river in Lower Austria. Its basin area is 413 km^{2} (159 sq mi).

The source of the Pitten is the confluence of its two headstreams Feistritz and Großer Pestingbach, near Hinterleiten, Feistritz am Wechsel. At Haderswörth in the parish of Lanzenkirchen, the Pitten and the Schwarza unite to form the Leitha, a tributary of the Danube.
