= Ternitz =

- Municipality
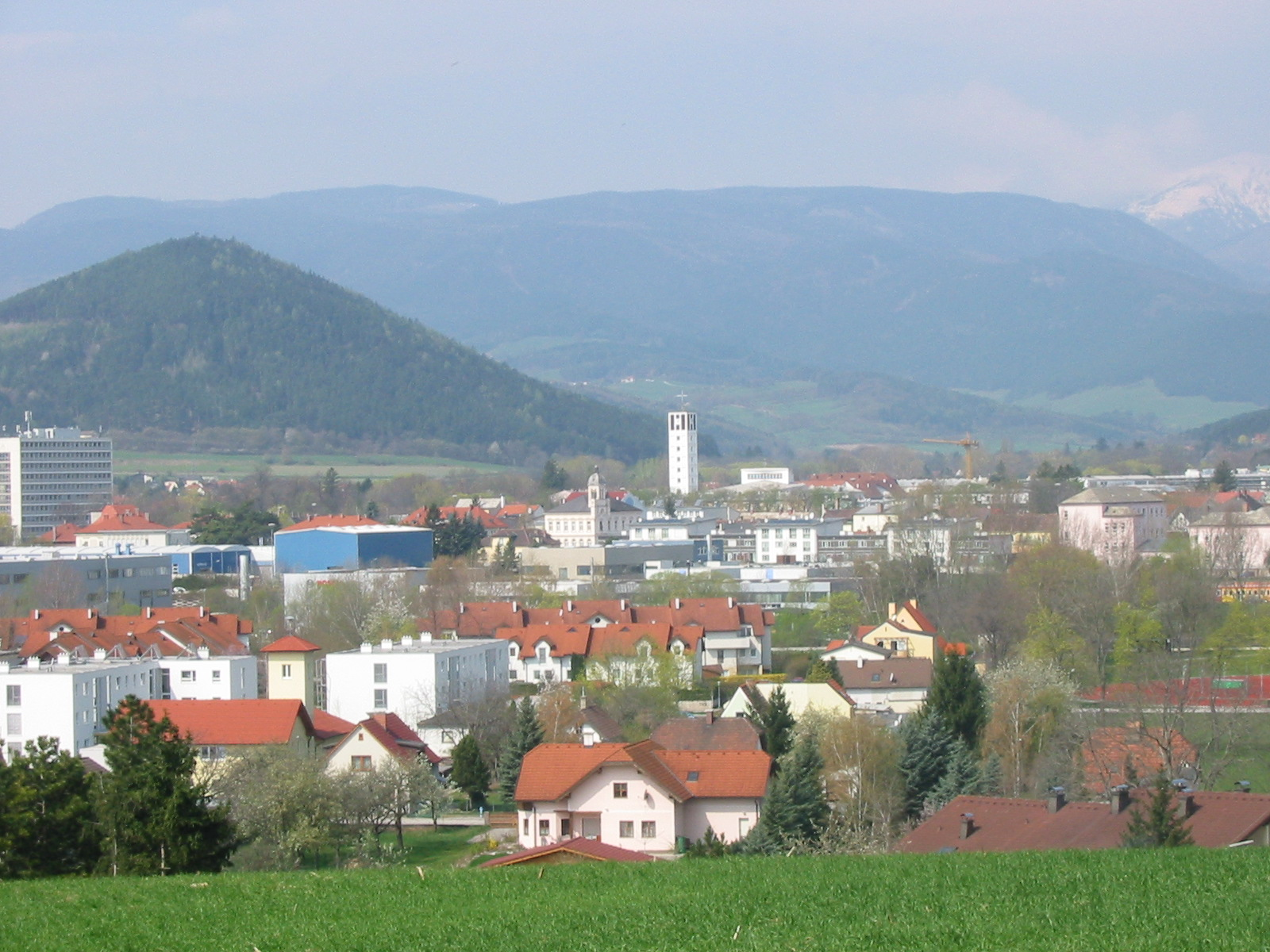
- View of Ternitz

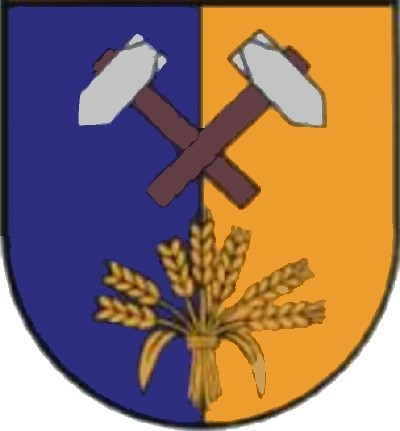
- Coat of arms

- Location within Austria
- Coordinates: 47°43′N 16°2′E
- Country: Austria
- State: Lower Austria
- District: Neunkirchen

Government
  - Mayor: Rupert Dworak

Area
  - Total: 65.35 km^{2} (25.23 sq mi)
- Elevation: 396 m (1,299 ft)

Population (2018-01-01)
  - Total: 14,632
  - Density: 223.9/km^{2} (579.9/sq mi)
- Time zone: UTC+1 (CET)
  - Summer (DST): UTC+2 (CEST)
- Postal code: 2630, 2631
- Area code: 02630
- Website: http://www.ternitz.at/

Ternitz is a town and municipality (14,823 inhabitants end 2014) in the district of Neunkirchen in the Austrian state of Lower Austria, situated at the confluence of the Sierning stream and the River Schwarza, at the western end of the Steinfeld plain. It is divided in the following parts, called Katastralgemeinden: Dunkelstein, Flatz, Holzweg, Mahrersdorf, Pottschach, Putzmannsdorf, Raglitz, Rohrbach am Steinfelde, St. Johann am Steinfelde and Sieding.

== History ==
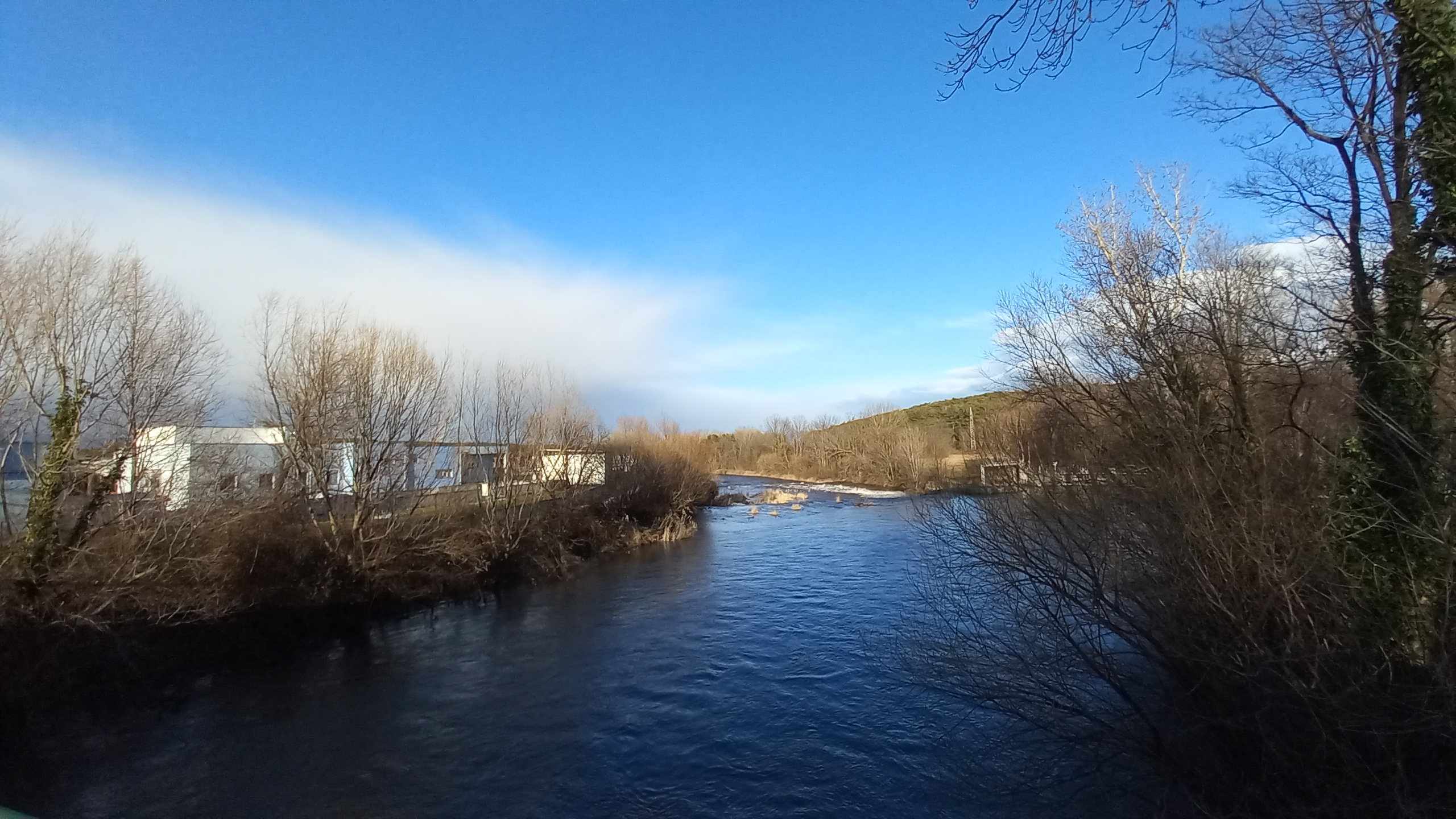
The river Schwarza in Ternitz

Ternitz's first documented mention was in 1352 and has town status since 1948. It is traditionally known as an industrial town, being home of the Schoeller-Bleckmann company, which was split up into 19 separate companies in 1989.

== Population ==
Historical population
Year	Pop.	±%
1869	4,509	—
1880	6,179	+37.0%
1890	7,286	+17.9%
1900	9,263	+27.1%
1910	11,285	+21.8%
1923	12,489	+10.7%
1934	12,775	+2.3%
1939	12,874	+0.8%
1951	14,523	+12.8%
1961	15,569	+7.2%
1971	16,515	+6.1%
1981	16,104	−2.5%
1991	15,443	−4.1%
2001	15,232	−1.4%
2011	14,831	−2.6%

== Twin towns ==
- Majosháza, Hungary
