= Wiener Neustadt Canal =

Coordinates: 48°04′31″N 16°20′59″E

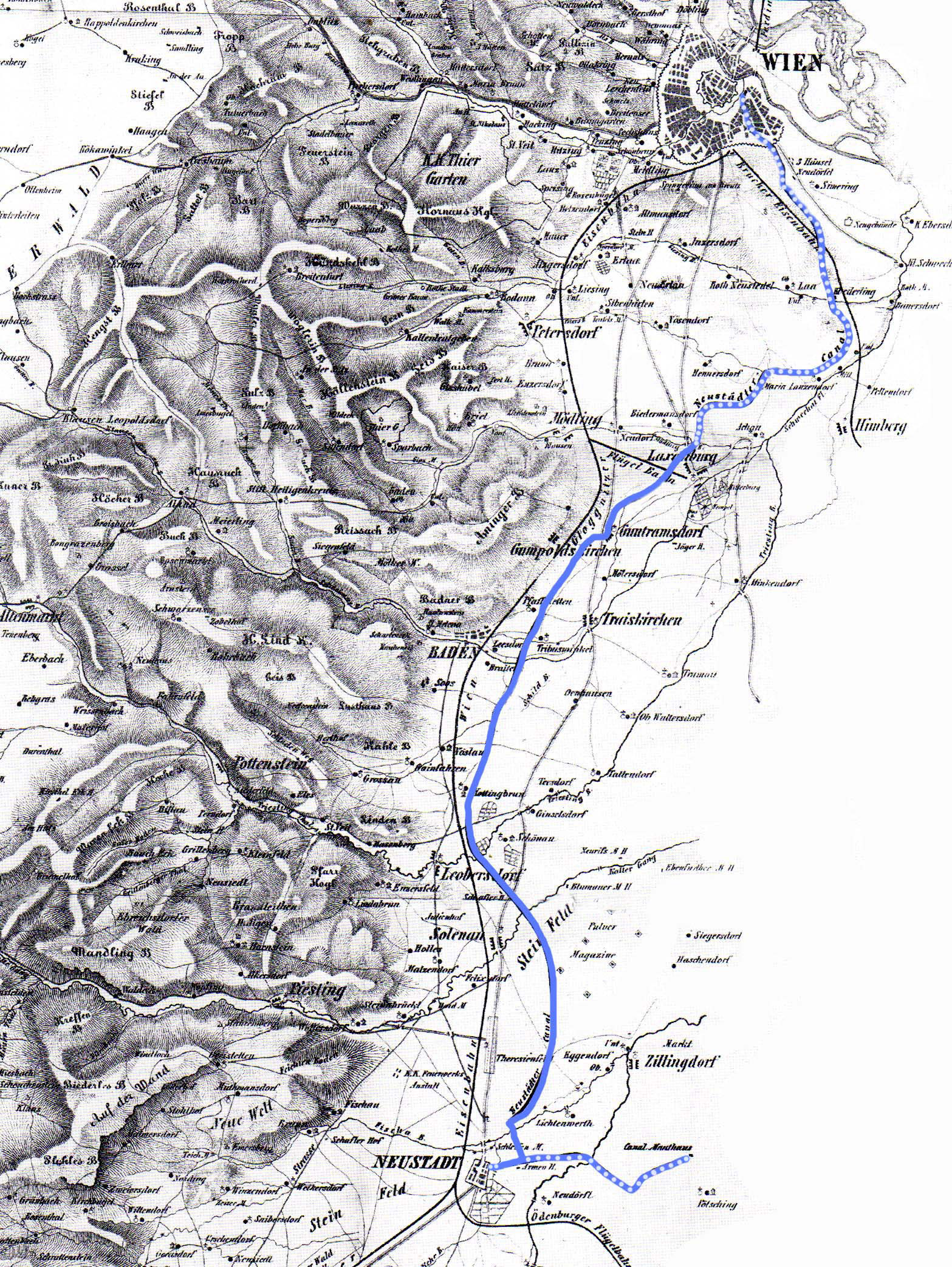
Image 1: Map of the Wiener Neustadt Canal circa 1875. The solid blue line indicates the portion that remains in 2007.

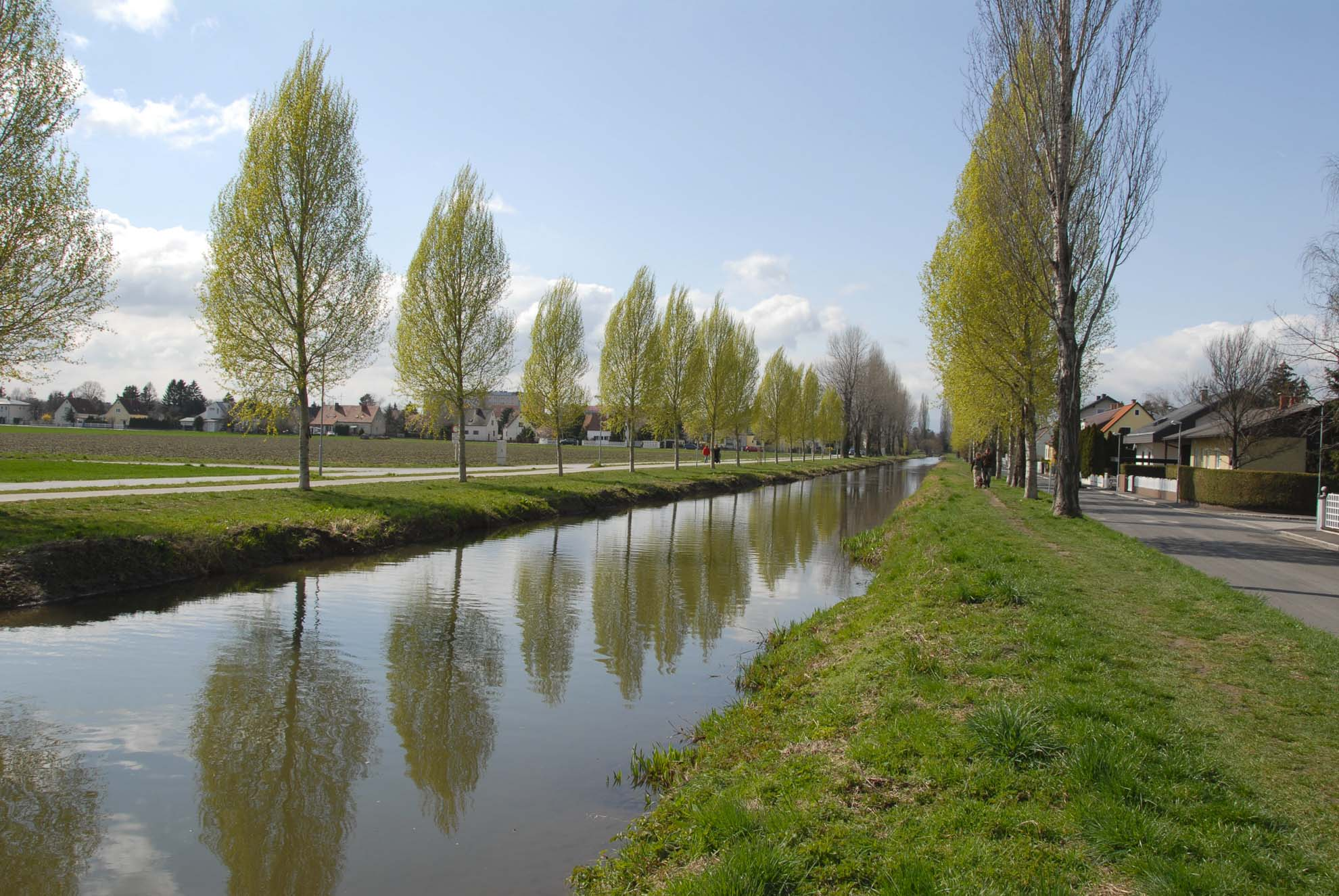
The Wiener Neustadt Canal in 2007.

The Wiener Neustadt Canal was Austria's only shipping canal, originally meant to reach from Vienna to Trieste's harbor to the Adriatic Sea. It became operational in 1803, and eventually covered 60 kilometres with 50 locks and a change in altitude of 103 metres between Vienna and Wiener Neustadt, where it terminated. Its eight bridges (built in the classical style) constitute Austria's oldest bridge ensemble. The canal has the unique feature of several two-level water crossings which date back to 1803; they separate the canal from other rivers and streams.

The canal had its heyday between 1857, when it transported vast quantities of bricks for the construction of the Vienna Ring Road, and the 1873 Vienna World's Fair. Brick barons leased the canal in order to transport their merchandise to Vienna at low cost. It has been called "Austria's largest monument to early industrialisation." The canal ceased to be used for transportation before World War I.

From 1797 to 1801, it was in shareholder ownership; it was under public administration from 1801 to 1822. It was leased to private contractors from 1822 to 1871, at which point it was purchased by the Österreichische Vereinsbank, which later became the Austro-Belgian Railroad Company (Austro-Belgische Eisenbahngesellschaft). In 1956, the State of Lower Austria purchased the canal. Profits from the canal dropped when rail freight became an attractive alternative.

Today, the canal is still used for water supply and some small power stations. It is used as an accompanying route for the Eurovelo 9 cycle path and other cycle paths. Its importance for the region's microclimate has been recognized. At the same time, the canal's historic industrial facilities continue to suffer from creeping decay, clearly visible in the missing lock gates.

== Bibliography ==
- Fritz Lange: Von Wien zur Adria – Der Wiener Neustädter Kanal, 2003, ISBN 3-89702-621-X.
- Heinrich Tinhofer: Der Wiener Neustädter Kanal: Achse des Industrieviertels, 2017, ISBN 978-3990247136.
