= Schneeberg (Alps) =

Mountain in eastern Austria

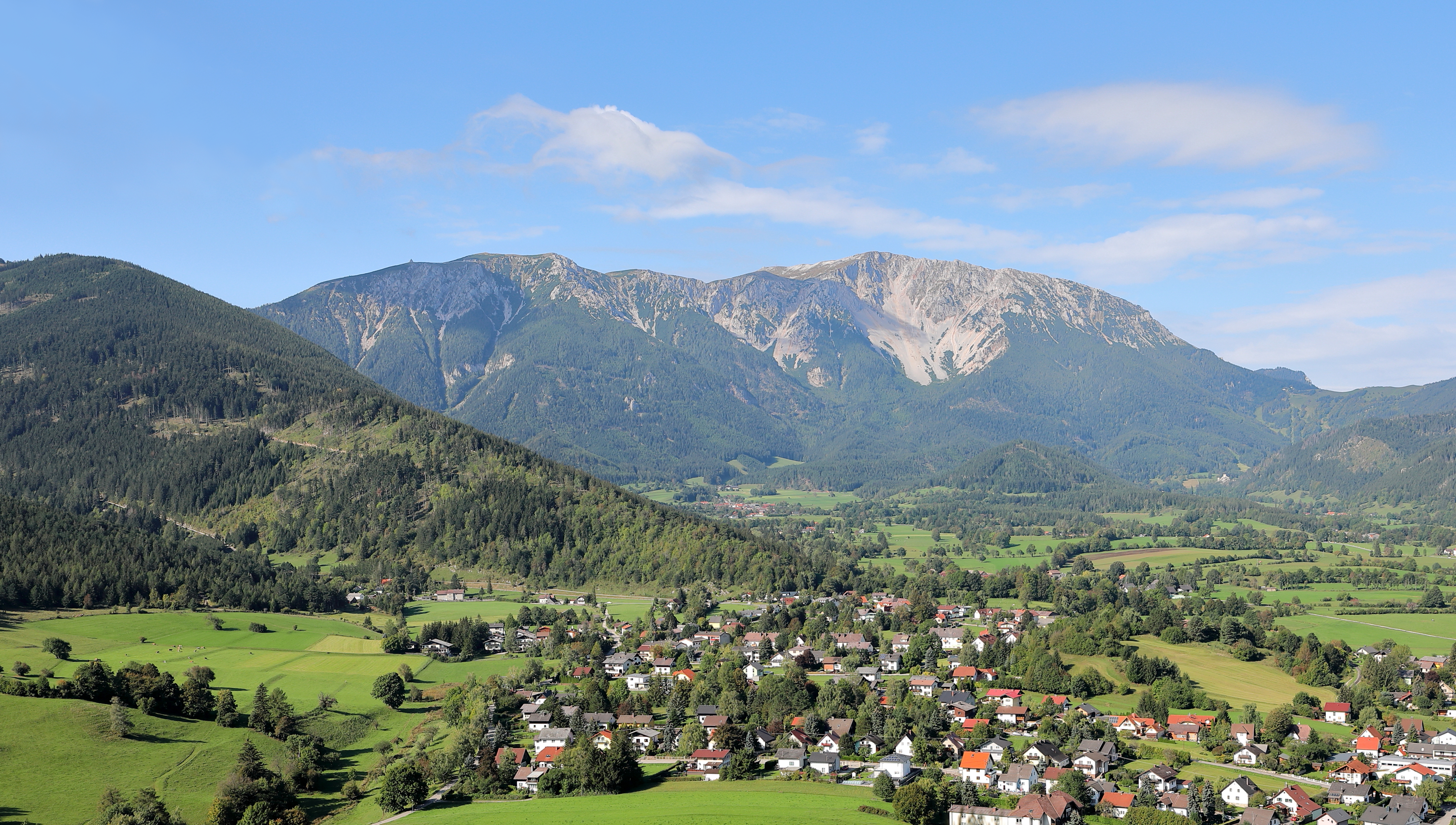
- East side of the mountain

Highest point
- Peak: Klosterwappen
- Elevation: 2,076 m (6,811 ft)
- Prominence: 1,348 m (4,423 ft)
- Coordinates: 47°46′3″N 15°48′28″E

Naming
- English translation: snow mountain
- Language of name: German
- Pronunciation: German: [ˈʃneːbɛɐk]

Geography
- Location within Austria
- Location: Lower Austria, Austria
- Parent range: Northern Limestone Alps

Climbing
- First ascent: Charles de l'Écluse

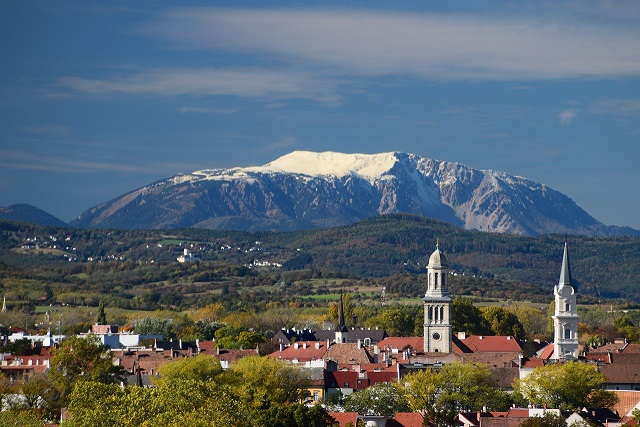
Schneeberg from Sopron

The Schneeberg (German pronunciation: [ˈʃneːbɛʁk]), with its 2,076-metre (6,811 ft) high summit Klosterwappen, is the highest mountain of Lower Austria, and the easternmost and northernmost mountain in the Alps to exceed 2000 m. It is a distinctive limestone massif with steep slopes on three sides and one of the most prominent and most isolated/dominant mountains of Austria.

The Schneeberg is one of the Northern Calcareous Alps in the borderland between Lower Austria and Styria, in the eastern part of Austria. It and the Rax (2,007 m or 6,585 ft), some 13 km (8.1 mi) to the south-west, are collectively considered the Viennese Hausberge (Vienna's "local mountains"). The rich Karst plateaux have provided drinking water for Vienna, via a 120 km (75 mi) long pipeline, since 1873, and is claimed to be the best drinking water in the world.

On clear days, Schneeberg can be readily seen from parts of Vienna, some 65 km (40 mi) away (as the crow flies), from Bratislava in Slovakia and even from Babí Lom above Brno 180 km away. The Schneeberg is a summit with a height of over 1500 m, which just misses the limit for an ultra-prominent peak (1500).

A rack-and-pinion railway, the Schneeberg Railway, now over 100 years old, climbs to a height of 1,800 m (5,900 ft), reducing the walk to the summit to an hour or two. There are also a number of other routes for walkers, including from the spa resort of Puchberg am Schneeberg to the east, or from the south, in Höllental. On the north side of the Schneeberg there is the Fadensteig as an ascent path. For experienced hikers, the path over the Fadensteig is worthwhile. The starting point of the Fadensteig is the Edelweißhütte on the Fadensattel at an altitude of 1,235 m.

The summit plateau has a number of mountain huts which are visited by thousands of walkers, climbers and even mountain-bikers each year. There are numerous ski runs, some of them very steep, the most famous of which leads over the Breite Ries.
