= Schwarzau im Gebirge =

- Municipality
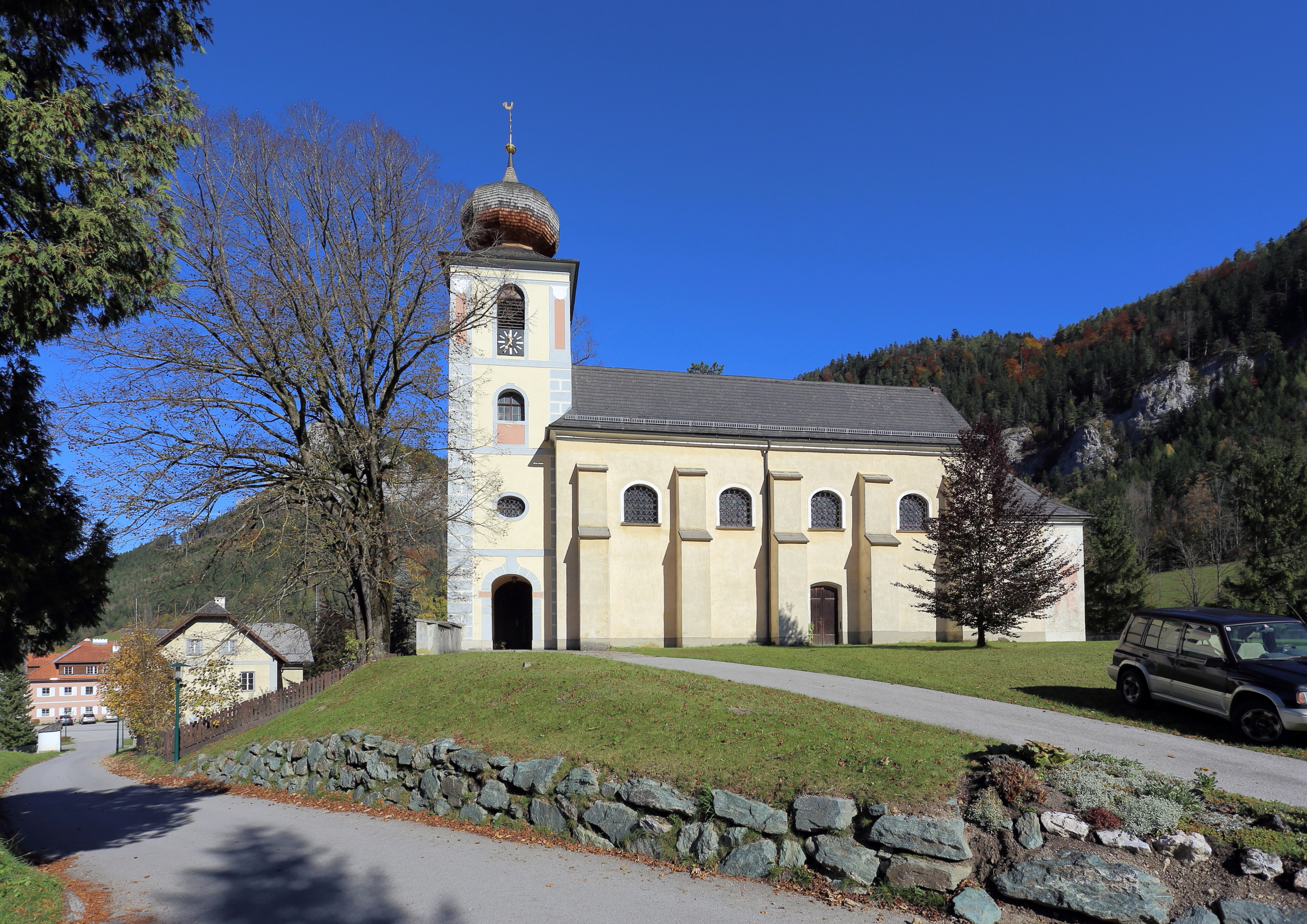
- Schwarzau im Gebirge parish church

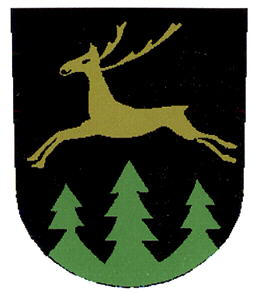
- Coat of arms

- Location within Austria
- Coordinates: 47°48′N 15°42′E
- Country: Austria
- State: Lower Austria
- District: Neunkirchen

Government
  - Mayor: Michael Streif (SPÖ)

Area
  - Total: 190.44 km^{2} (73.53 sq mi)
- Elevation: 617 m (2,024 ft)

Population (2018-01-01)
  - Total: 644
  - Density: 3.38/km^{2} (8.76/sq mi)
- Time zone: UTC+1 (CET)
  - Summer (DST): UTC+2 (CEST)
- Postal code: 2662
- Area code: 02567
- Website: www.schwarzauimgebirge.at

Schwarzau im Gebirge is a village in the district of Neunkirchen in the Austrian state of Lower Austria.

== Population ==
Historical population
Year	Pop.	±%
1869	2,114	—
1880	2,008	−5.0%
1890	1,897	−5.5%
1900	1,869	−1.5%
1910	1,801	−3.6%
1923	1,598	−11.3%
1934	1,588	−0.6%
1939	1,478	−6.9%
1951	1,522	+3.0%
1961	1,317	−13.5%
1971	1,162	−11.8%
1981	966	−16.9%
1991	918	−5.0%
2001	831	−9.5%
2011	698	−16.0%
