= Lanzenkirchen =

- Municipality
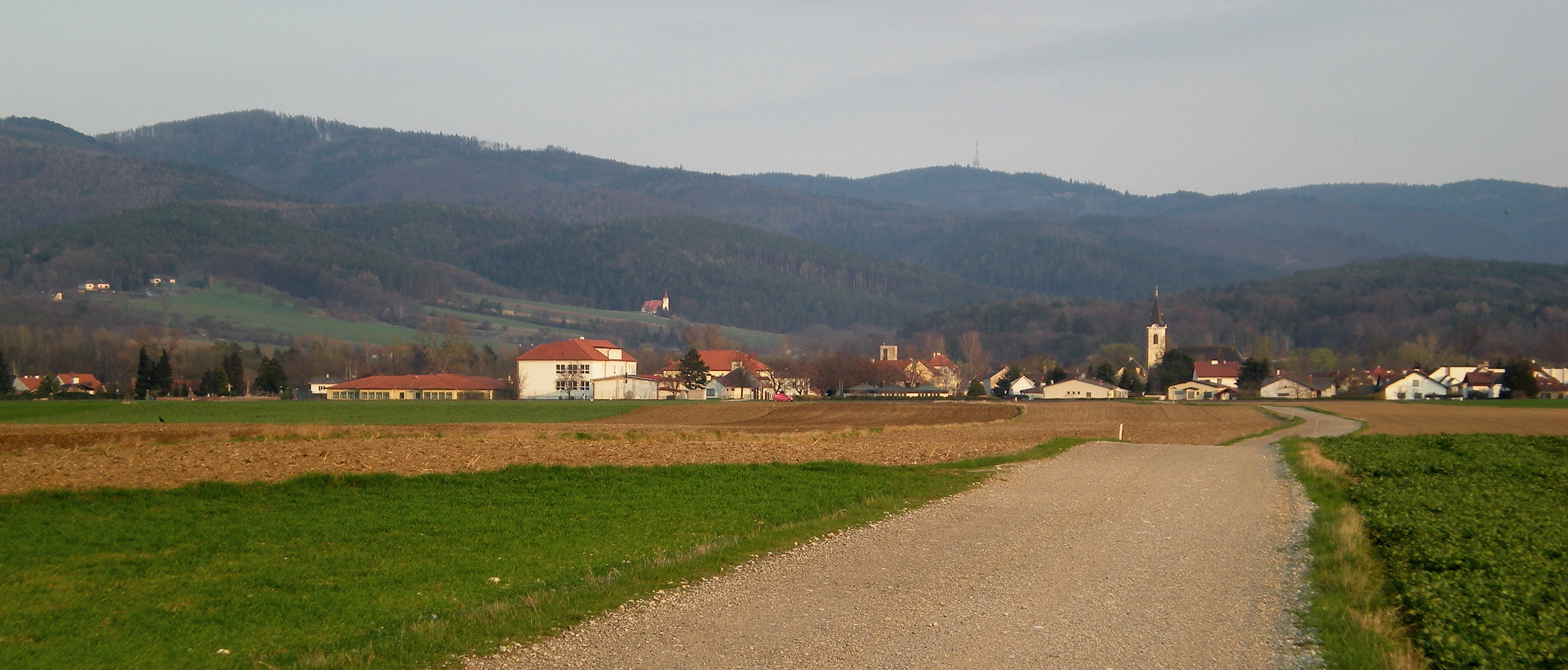
- View of Lanzenkirchen

- Coat of arms

- Location within Austria
- Coordinates: 47°44′50″N 16°14′50″E
- Country: Austria
- State: Lower Austria
- District: Wiener Neustadt-Land

Government
  - Mayor: Bernhard Karnthaler (ÖVP)

Area
  - Total: 29.84 km^{2} (11.52 sq mi)
- Elevation: 298 m (978 ft)

Population (2018-01-01)
  - Total: 3,983
  - Density: 133.5/km^{2} (345.7/sq mi)
- Time zone: UTC+1 (CET)
  - Summer (DST): UTC+2 (CEST)
- Postal code: 2821
- Area code: 02627
- Vehicle registration: WB
- Website: www.lanzenkirchen.gv.at

Lanzenkirchen is a market town in the district of Wiener Neustadt-Land in the Austrian state of Lower Austria.

== Geography ==
Lanzenkirchen is situated on the river Leitha, south of the city Wiener Neustadt, at the foot of the Rosaliengebirge mountain range. The municipality consists of five Katastralgemeinden: Lanzenkirchen, Frohsdorf, Haderswörth, Kleinwolkersdorf and Ofenbach.

== History ==
=== Origin of the place names in Lanzenkirchen ===
Lanzenkirchen: The name comes from a German settler who built a church. His name was Anzo or Lanzo. The name Lanzenkirchen was first mentioned in 1130.

Frohsdorf: The original name was Krottendorf because many toads (German: Kröten) were found in the water-rich area. It became Froschdorf in the 17th century (German: Frosch means "frog"). Its present name has been used since the beginning of the 19th century.

Haderswörth: This name means "river island of Hadurich".

Kleinwolkersdorf: Until around 1800 the village was known as Wolfkersdorf, meaning "village of Wolfkers".

Ofenbach: The place was originally known as Quenbach. The origin of the name Ofenbach is unknown.

== Sites of interest ==
- Schloss Frohsdorf, a baroque castle
- the 13th century St. Nicholas church in Lanzenkirchen
