= Payerbach =

- Municipality
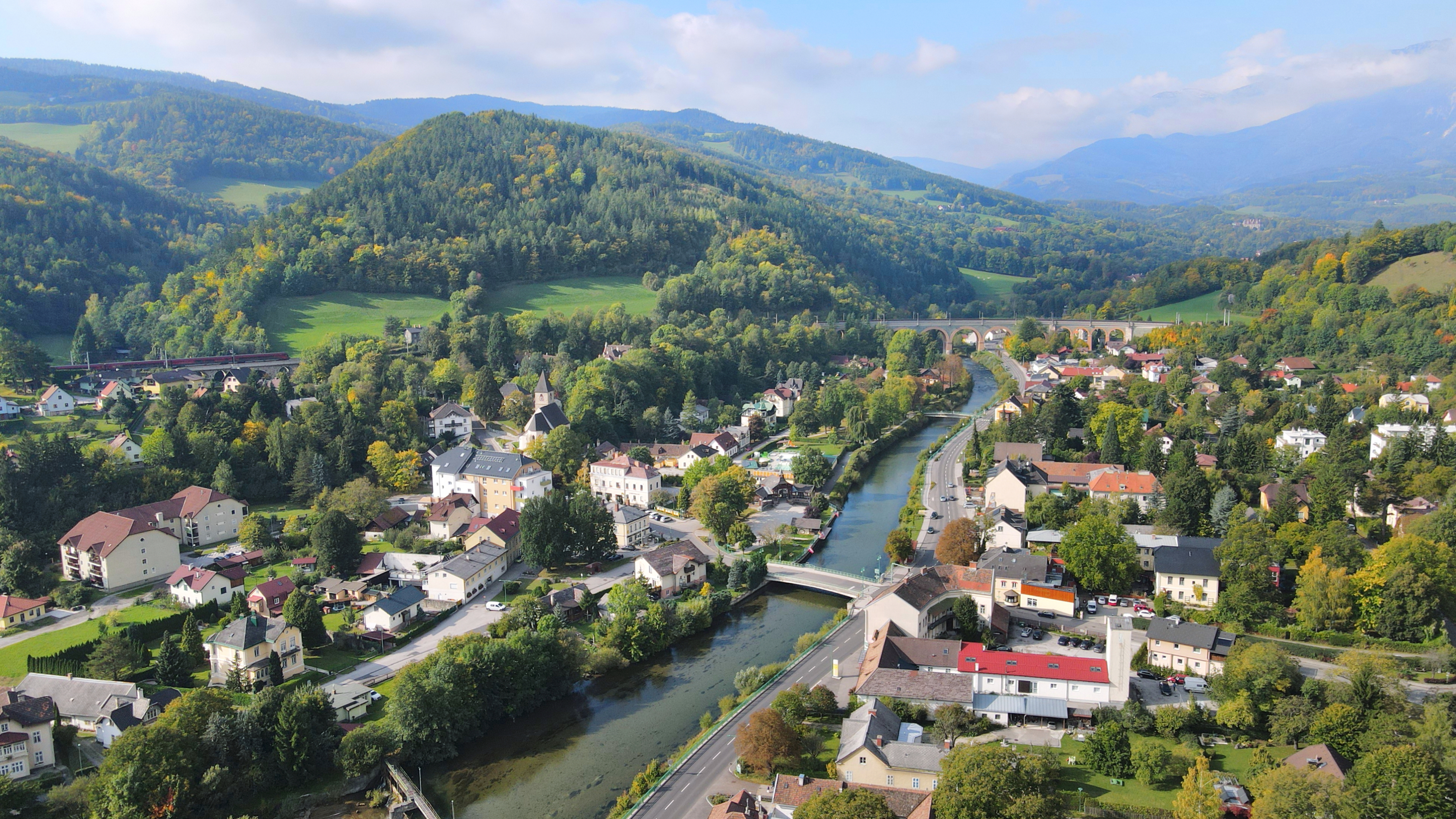
- East view of Payerbach

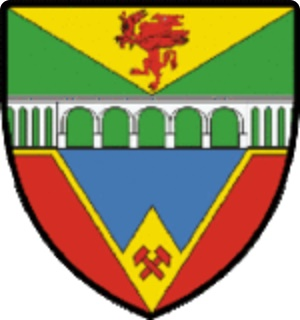
- Coat of arms

- Location within Austria
- Coordinates: 47°41′30″N 15°51′46″E
- Country: Austria
- State: Lower Austria
- District: Neunkirchen

Government
  - Mayor: Jochen Bous

Area
  - Total: 17.68 km^{2} (6.83 sq mi)
- Elevation: 483 m (1,585 ft)

Population (2018-01-01)
  - Total: 2,076
  - Density: 117.4/km^{2} (304.1/sq mi)
- Time zone: UTC+1 (CET)
  - Summer (DST): UTC+2 (CEST)
- Postal code: 2650
- Area code: 02666
- Website: www.payerbach.at

Payerbach is a town in the district of Neunkirchen in the Austrian state of Lower Austria.

== Population ==
Historical population
Year	Pop.	±%
1869	1,893	—
1880	2,488	+31.4%
1890	2,793	+12.3%
1900	3,104	+11.1%
1910	3,348	+7.9%
1923	3,609	+7.8%
1934	3,459	−4.2%
1939	3,393	−1.9%
1951	3,215	−5.2%
1961	2,957	−8.0%
1971	2,801	−5.3%
1981	2,551	−8.9%
1991	2,242	−12.1%
2001	2,357	+5.1%
2011	2,130	−9.6%

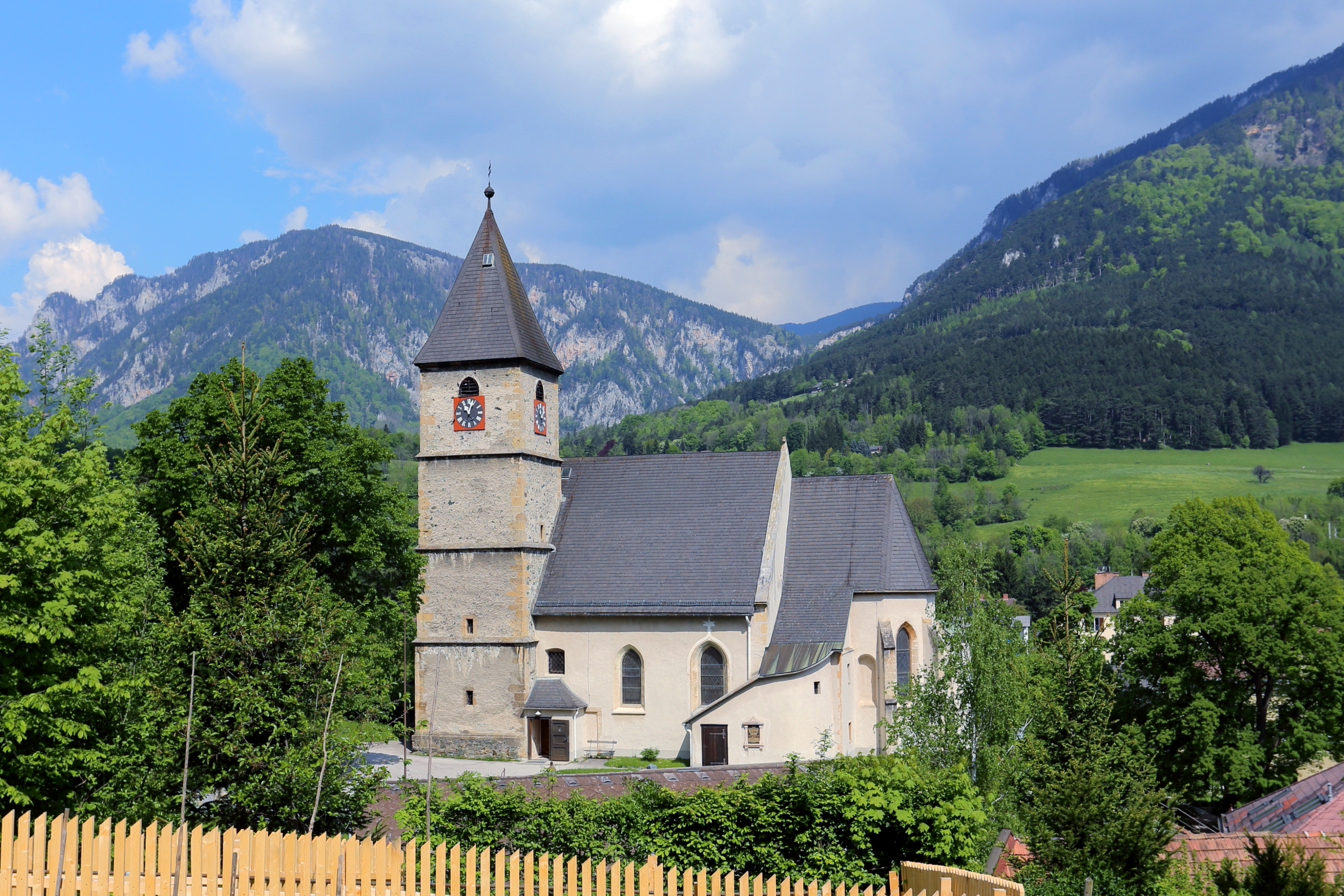
Parish church St. James the Greater

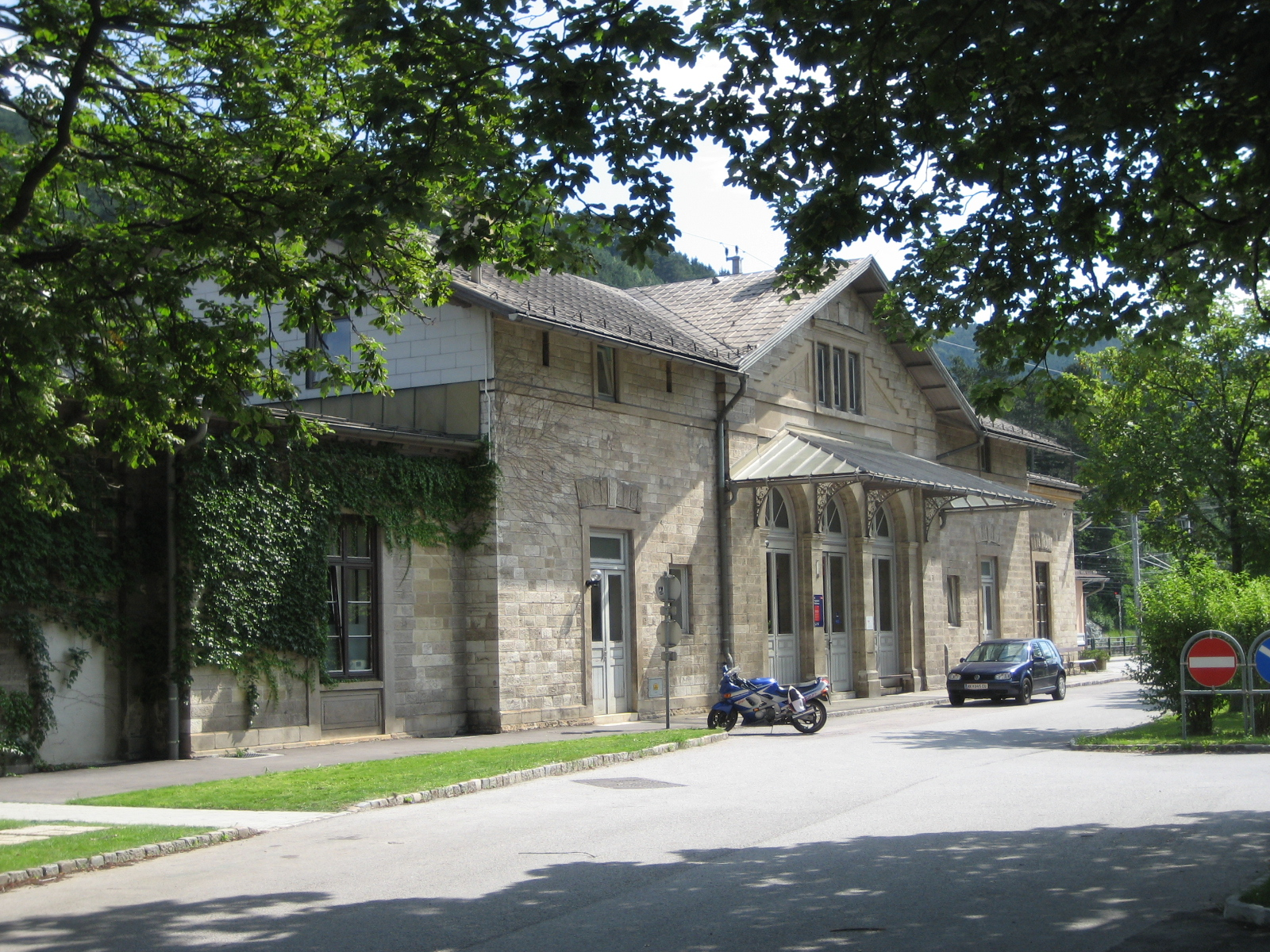
Train station Payerbach-Reichenau
