= Neunkirchen, Austria =

City in Lower Austria, Austria

Neunkirchen
- Municipality
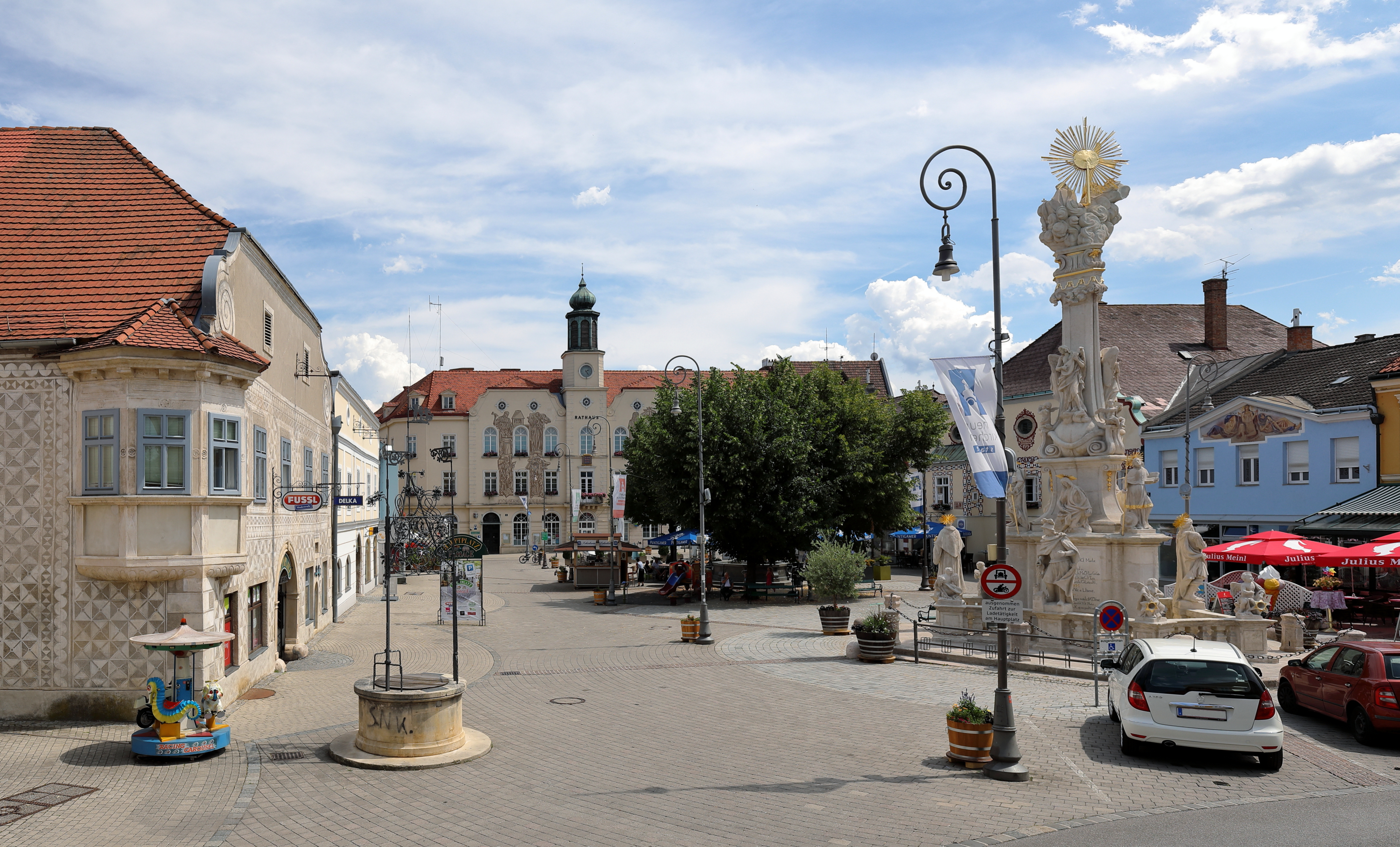
- main square of Neunkirchen

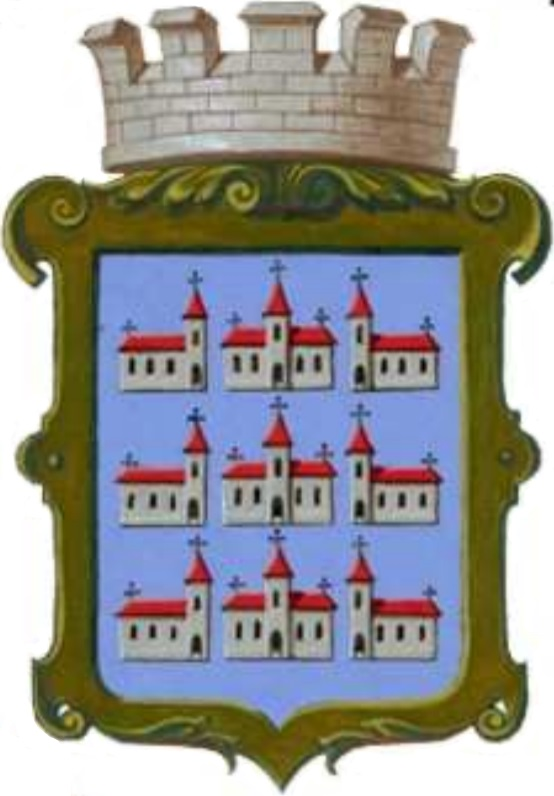
- Flag Coat of arms

- Location within Lower Austria Location within Austria
- Coordinates: 47°44′N 16°5′E
- Country: Austria
- State: Lower Austria
- District: Neunkirchen

Government
  - Mayor: Herbert Osterbauer (ÖVP)

Area
  - Total: 20.3 km^{2} (7.8 sq mi)
- Elevation: 371 m (1,217 ft)

Population (2018-01-01)
  - Total: 12,879
  - Density: 634/km^{2} (1,640/sq mi)
- Time zone: UTC+1 (CET)
  - Summer (DST): UTC+2 (CEST)
- Postal code: 2620
- Area code: 02635
- Website: www.neunkirchen.gv.at

Neunkirchen (German: [ˈnɔʏnˌkɪʁçn̩]) is the capital of the district of Neunkirchen in the Austrian state of Lower Austria. As of 2020 it has a population of 12,721.

== Geography ==
Neunkirchen is situated in the Steinfeld region of the Vienna Basin, part of Industrieviertel in the southeastern area of Lower Austria. The Schwarza river flows through it.

=== Geographic breakdown ===
The municipality consists of three localities, which are also cadastral communities of the same names (area as of 1 January 2001, population as of 1 January 2022):

- Mollram (8.23 km²; pop. 702)
- Neunkirchen (5.96 km²; pop. 11.152) Quarters: Innere Stadt, Tal, Steinplatte, Mühlfeld, Au, Steinfeld, Lerchenfeld, Blätterstraßensiedlung
- Peisching (6.12 km²; pop. 691)

=== Neighbouring municipalities ===
NE: Sankt Egyden am Steinfeld; E: Breitenau; SE: Natschbach-Loipersbach; S: Wartmannstetten; W: Ternitz; NW: Würflach

== History ==
Neunkirchen is one of the oldest settlements in the Vienna Basin. It has been permanently settled since the La Tène culture. There was a Roman settlement from about 30 to 400 AD near the inner city, but its name is unknown. Neunkirchen was first mentioned in 1094 as "Niuwenchirgun". The town was given city status in 1920.

== Transportation ==
Neunkirchen lies on the Südbahn (German: Southern Railway), Cityjet Xpress (CJX9) trains connecting it to Wiener Neustadt, Payerbach-Reichenau, and Vienna in 30 minute intervals.

Neunkirchen also lies on the S6 Semmering Schnellstraße motorway.

== Population ==
Historical population
Year	Pop.	±%
1869	6,540	—
1880	7,677	+17.4%
1890	9,658	+25.8%
1900	11,797	+22.1%
1910	12,920	+9.5%
1923	12,920	+0.0%
1934	12,563	−2.8%
1939	11,894	−5.3%
1951	11,615	−2.3%
1961	10,924	−5.9%
1971	10,875	−0.4%
1981	11,005	+1.2%
1991	10,784	−2.0%
2001	11,028	+2.3%
2011	12,323	+11.7%

== Personalities ==
- Anton Burger, Austrian-German commandant of Theresienstadt concentration camp, Nazi SS war criminal, born in Neunkirchen.
- Christian Fuchs, Austrian footballer, born in Neunkirchen.
- Markus Höttinger, Austrian racing driver, born in Neunkirchen.
- Hubert Mara, Austrian computer scientist, born in Neunkirchen.
- Julius Steinfeld, Agudat Yisrael politician, coorganizer of the Kindertransport.
- Alfons Maria Stickler, Austrian prelate, born in Neunkirchen.
