= Grottendorf =

Grottendorf is the name of following places:

- a cadastral community of the municipal Feistritz am Wechsel in Lower Austria, Austria
- a cadastral community of the municipal Gföhl in Lower Austria, Austria
