= Breitenau =

Breitenau may refer to:

- Breitenau, Germany, in Rhineland-Palatinate, Germany
- Breitenau, a part of Bad Gottleuba-Berggießhübel in Saxony, Germany
- Breitenau, Bas-Rhin, in Alsace, France
- Breitenau, Austria, in Lower Austria, Austria
- Breitenau am Hochlantsch, in Styria, Austria
- Breitenau, a part of Guxhagen in Hesse, Germany
  - Breitenau monastery, in Guxhagen
    - Breitenau concentration camp, during Nazi Germany at the Breitenau monastery

See also

- Breitnau
