= Breitenstein, Lower Austria =

Breitenstein
- Municipality
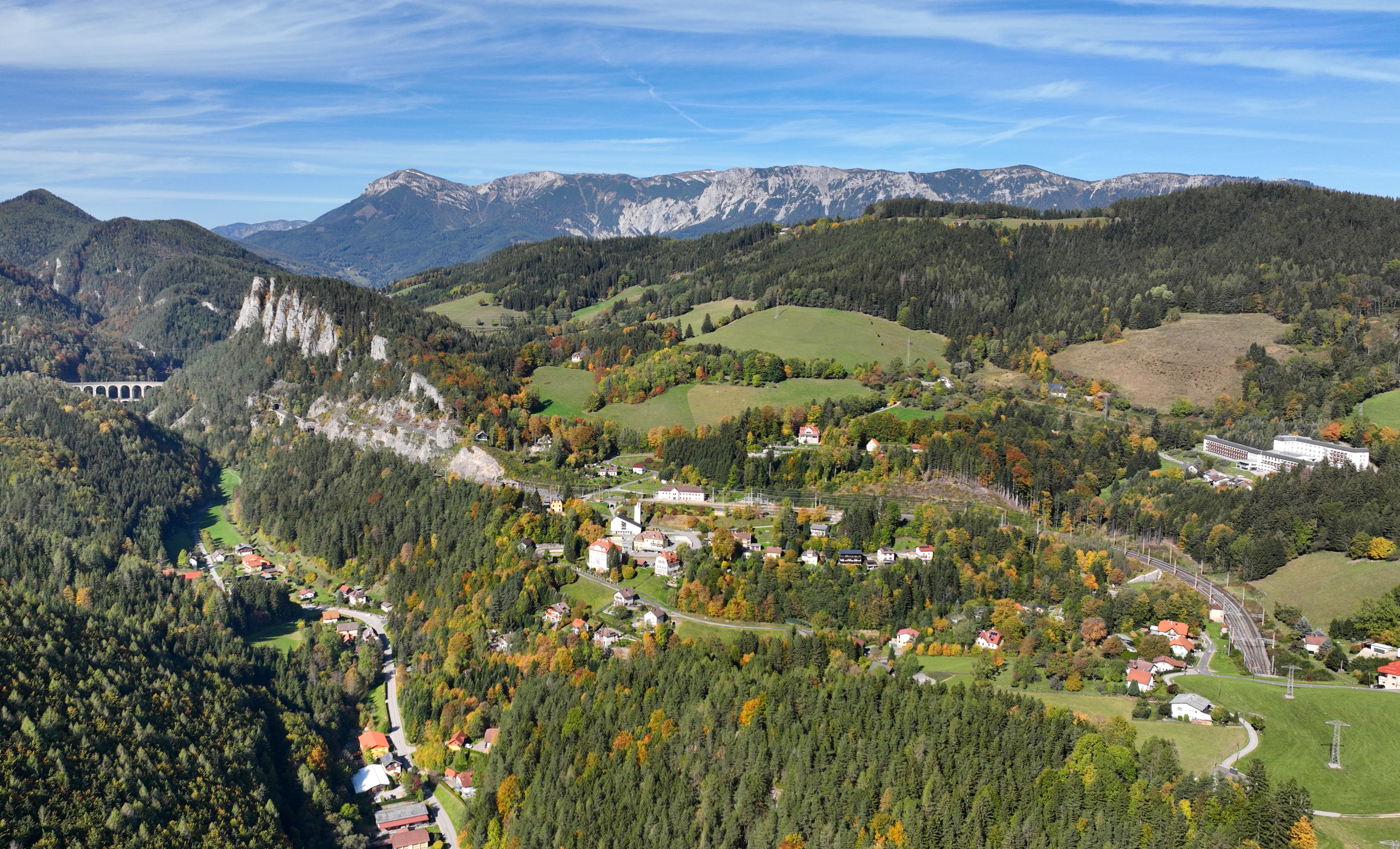
- Southeast view of Breitenstein

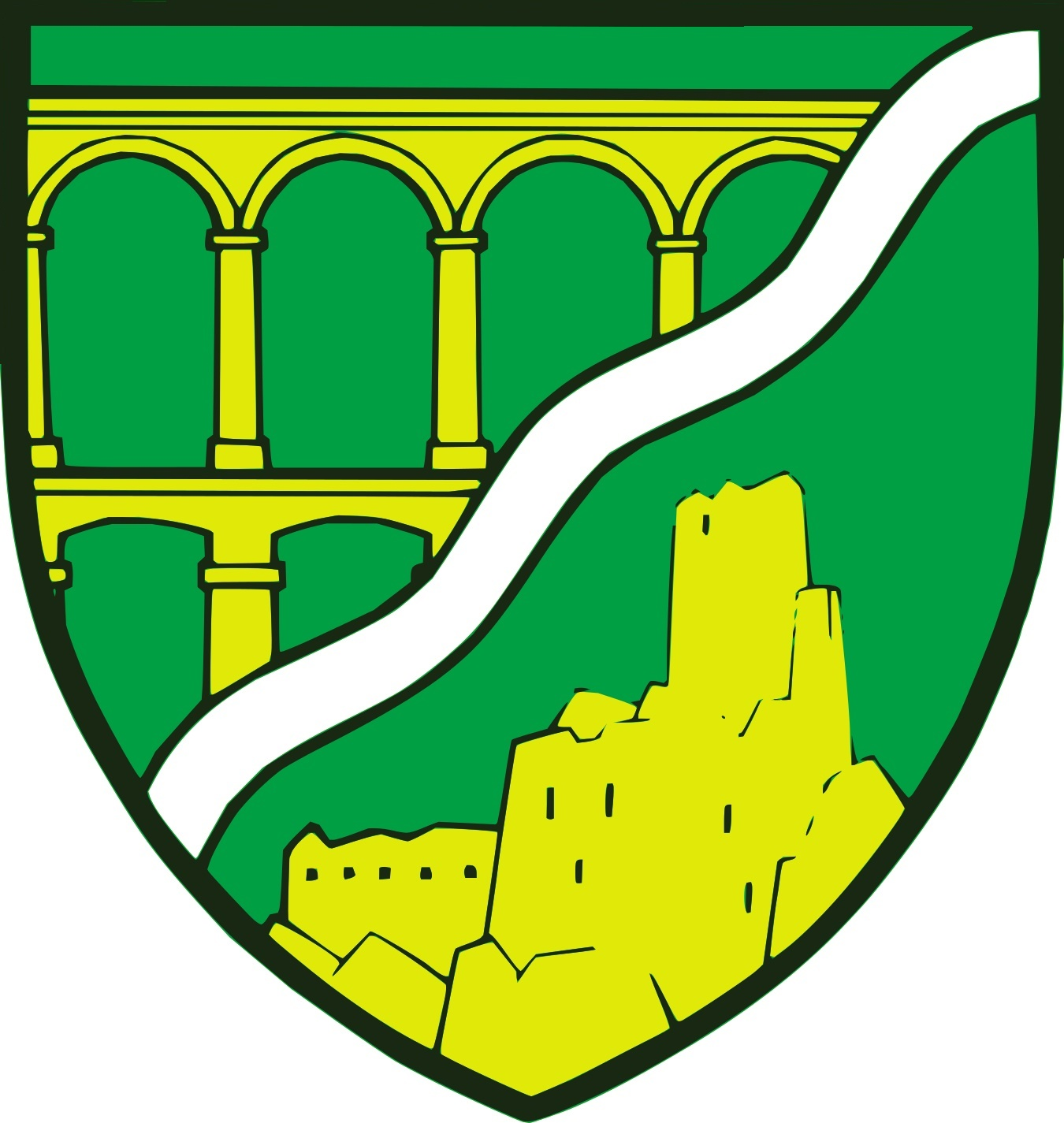
- Coat of arms

- Location within Austria
- Coordinates: 47°39′28″N 15°49′10″E
- Country: Austria
- State: Lower Austria
- District: Neunkirchen

Government
  - Mayor: Engelbert Rinnhofer (ÖVP)

Area
  - Total: 20.29 km^{2} (7.83 sq mi)
- Elevation: 779 m (2,556 ft)

Population (2018-01-01)
  - Total: 318
  - Density: 15.7/km^{2} (40.6/sq mi)
- Time zone: UTC+1 (CET)
  - Summer (DST): UTC+2 (CEST)
- Postal code: 2641
- Area code: 02664
- Website: www.breitenstein.at

Breitenstein (German pronunciation: [ˈbʁaɪtn̩ˌʃtaɪn]) is a small town in the Austrian state of Lower Austria. It is one of the towns found on the Semmering Railway line which is a UNESCO World Heritage Site. Translated from German the name means "Broad Stone" due to its large rock faces.

== Population ==
Historical population
Year	Pop.	±%
1869	656	—
1880	613	−6.6%
1890	677	+10.4%
1900	811	+19.8%
1910	863	+6.4%
1923	827	−4.2%
1934	848	+2.5%
1939	710	−16.3%
1951	756	+6.5%
1961	620	−18.0%
1971	502	−19.0%
1981	467	−7.0%
1991	427	−8.6%
2001	371	−13.1%
2011	343	−7.5%
