= Prigglitz =

- Municipality
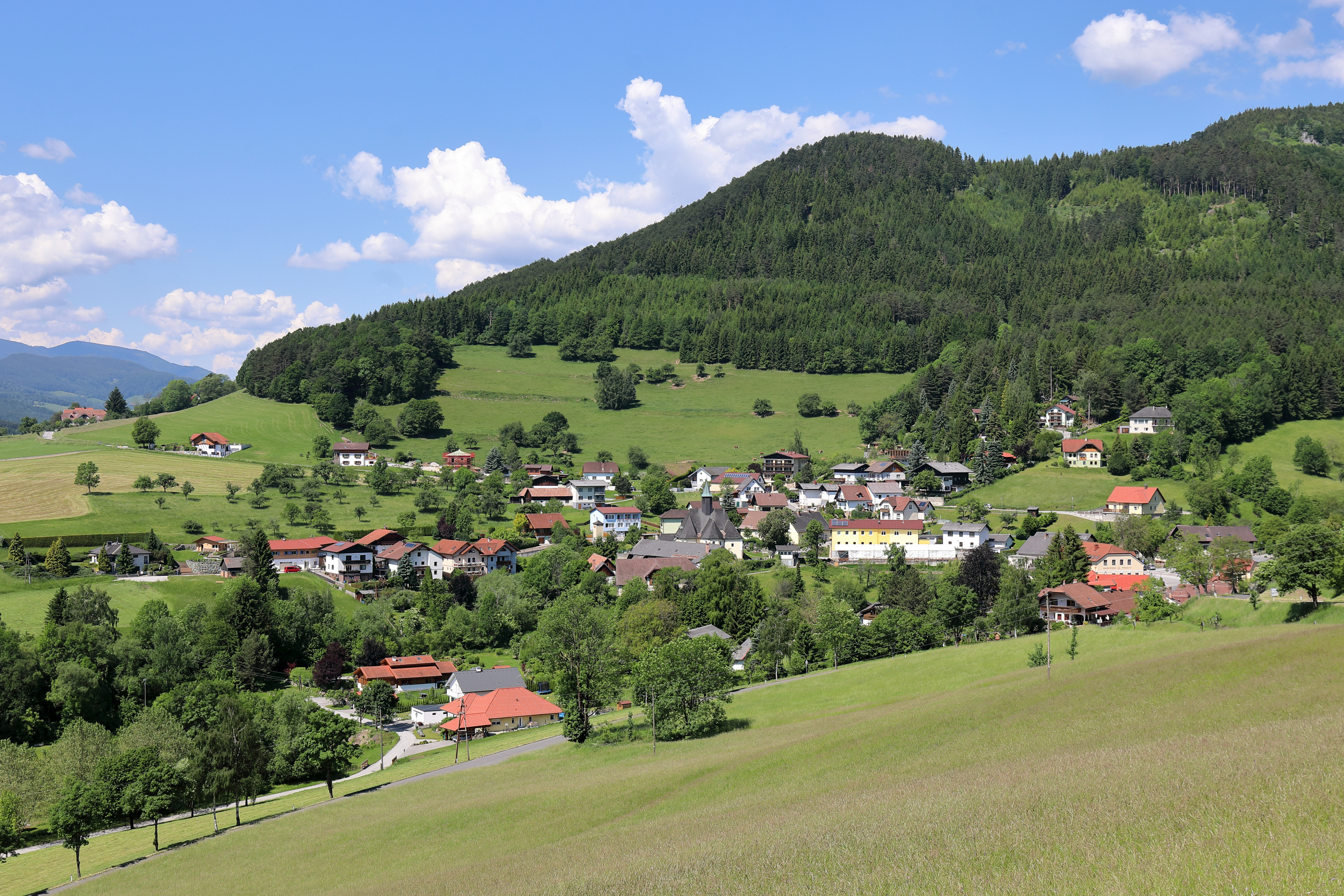

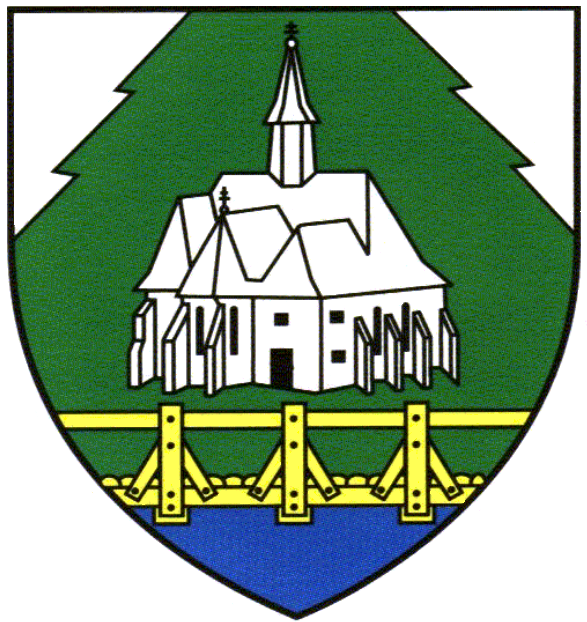
- Coat of arms

- Location within Austria
- Coordinates: 47°42′N 15°55′E
- Country: Austria
- State: Lower Austria
- District: Neunkirchen

Government
  - Mayor: Franz Teix

Area
  - Total: 17.97 km^{2} (6.94 sq mi)
- Elevation: 635 m (2,083 ft)

Population (2018-01-01)
  - Total: 434
  - Density: 24.2/km^{2} (62.6/sq mi)
- Time zone: UTC+1 (CET)
  - Summer (DST): UTC+2 (CEST)
- Postal code: 2640
- Area code: 02662
- Website: www.prigglitz.at

Prigglitz is a town in the district of Neunkirchen in the Austrian state of Lower Austria.

== Population ==
Historical population
Year	Pop.	±%
1869	661	—
1880	639	−3.3%
1890	619	−3.1%
1900	649	+4.8%
1910	674	+3.9%
1923	659	−2.2%
1934	656	−0.5%
1939	639	−2.6%
1951	552	−13.6%
1961	515	−6.7%
1971	506	−1.7%
1981	531	+4.9%
1991	535	+0.8%
2001	514	−3.9%
2011	483	−6.0%
