= Altendorf, Austria =

Altendorf
- Municipality
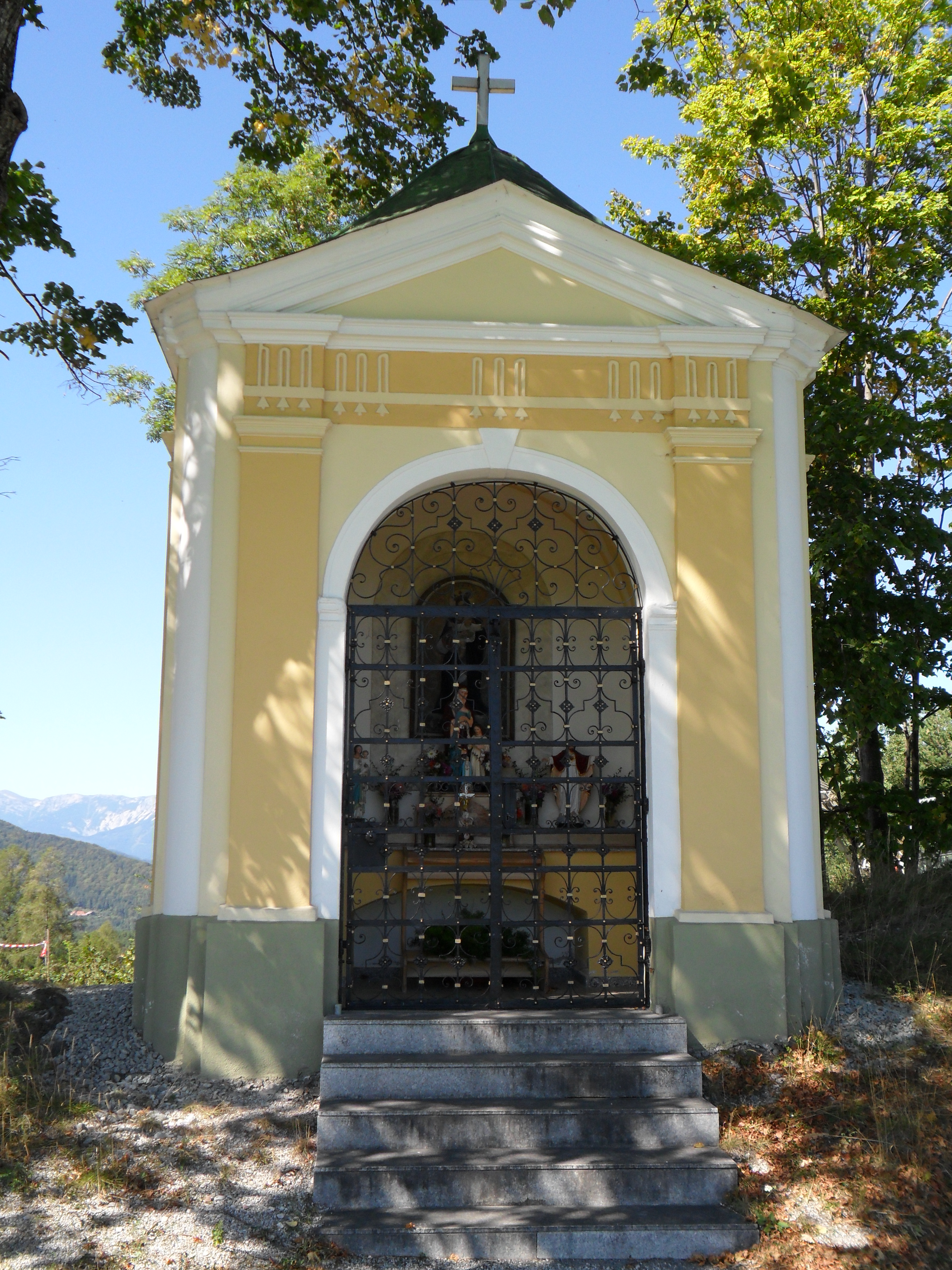
- Chapel along the road (Schönstadl, part of Altendorf)

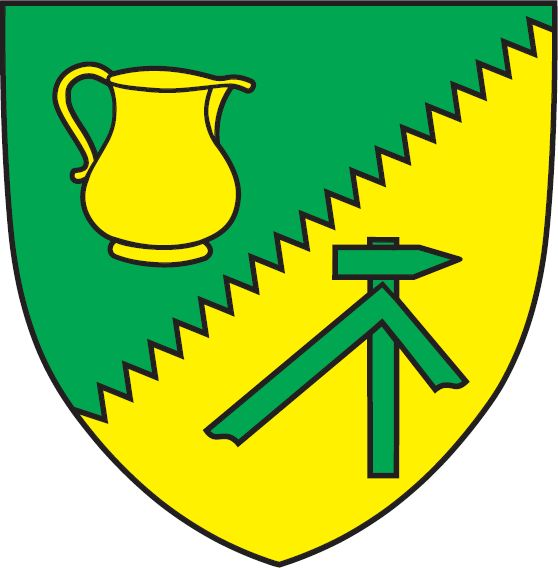
- Coat of arms

- Location within Austria
- Coordinates: 47°39′N 16°1′E
- Country: Austria
- State: Lower Austria
- District: Neunkirchen

Government
  - Mayor: Ulrike Trybus (ÖVP)

Area
  - Total: 7.2 km^{2} (2.8 sq mi)
- Elevation: 680 m (2,230 ft)

Population (2023-01-01)
  - Total: 363
  - Density: 50/km^{2} (130/sq mi)
- Time zone: UTC+1 (CET)
  - Summer (DST): UTC+2 (CEST)
- Postal code: 2632
- Area code: 02662
- Website: www.gemeinde-altendorf.at

Altendorf (Austrian German pronunciation: [ˈaltn̩ˌdɔrf], lit. 'old village') is a town in the district of Neunkirchen in the Austrian state of Lower Austria.

== Population ==
Historical population
Year	Pop.	±%
1869	270	—
1880	304	+12.6%
1890	286	−5.9%
1900	309	+8.0%
1910	300	−2.9%
1923	344	+14.7%
1934	345	+0.3%
1939	320	−7.2%
1951	285	−10.9%
1961	270	−5.3%
1971	237	−12.2%
1981	298	+25.7%
1991	308	+3.4%
2001	382	+24.0%
2011	306	−19.9%
