= Schrattenbach =

- Municipality
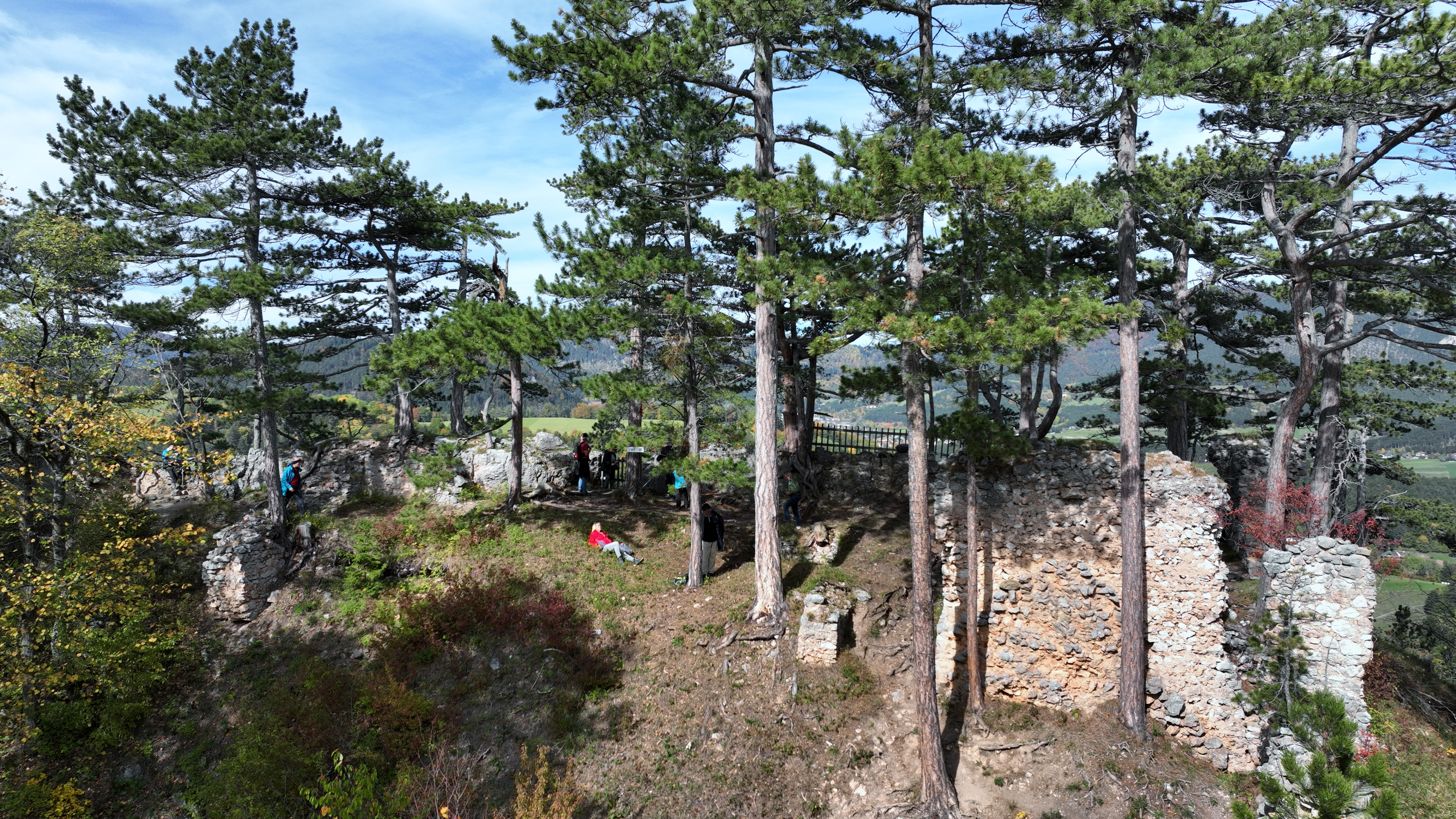
- Schrattenstein Fortress ruins

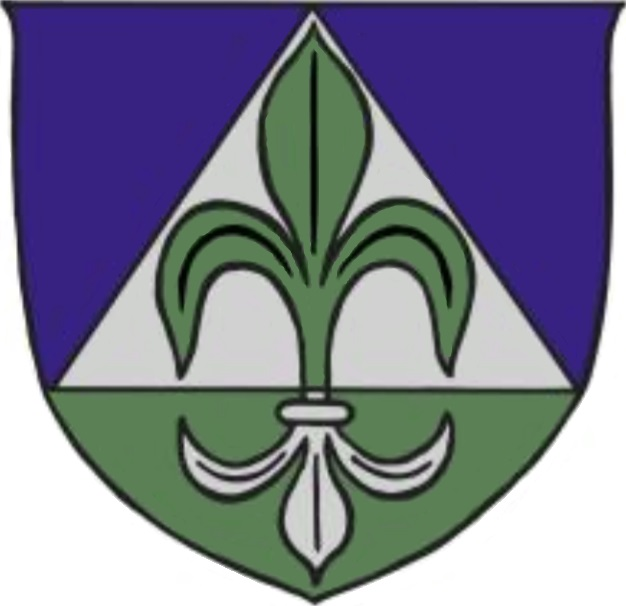
- Coat of arms

- Location within Austria
- Coordinates: 47°47′N 16°0′E
- Country: Austria
- State: Lower Austria
- District: Neunkirchen

Government
  - Mayor: Franz Poelzelbauer

Area
  - Total: 10.82 km^{2} (4.18 sq mi)
- Elevation: 517 m (1,696 ft)

Population (2018-01-01)
  - Total: 363
  - Density: 33.5/km^{2} (86.9/sq mi)
- Time zone: UTC+1 (CET)
  - Summer (DST): UTC+2 (CEST)
- Postal code: 2733
- Area code: 02637
- Website: www.schrattenbach.at

Schrattenbach is a town in the district of Neunkirchen in the Austrian state of Lower Austria.

== Population ==
Historical population
Year	Pop.	±%
1869	374	—
1880	341	−8.8%
1890	358	+5.0%
1900	383	+7.0%
1910	360	−6.0%
1923	383	+6.4%
1934	353	−7.8%
1939	365	+3.4%
1951	338	−7.4%
1961	356	+5.3%
1971	371	+4.2%
1981	360	−3.0%
1991	380	+5.6%
2001	376	−1.1%
2011	357	−5.1%
