= Neunkirchen District, Austria =

Coordinates: 47.7269°N 16.0817°E

Neunkirchen District, Austria Bezirk Neunkirchen
- District
- Country: Austria
- State: Lower Austria
- Number of municipalities: 45
- Administrative seat: Neunkirchen

Government
  - District Governor: Alexandra Grabner-Fritz

Area
  - Total: 1,146.4 km^{2} (442.6 sq mi)

Population (2024)
  - Total: 87,305
  - Density: 76.156/km^{2} (197.24/sq mi)
- Time zone: UTC+01:00 (CET)
  - Summer (DST): UTC+02:00 (CEST)
- Vehicle registration: NK
- NUTS code: AT122
- District code: 318

Bezirk Neunkirchen (German: [ˈnɔʏnˌkɪʁçn̩]) is a district of the state of Lower Austria in Austria. It is located at the south of the state.

== Municipalities ==
- Altendorf

Parts of the village: Altendorf, Loitzmannsdorf, Schönstadl, Syhrn, Tachenberg

- Aspang-Markt
- Aspangberg-Sankt Peter

Parts of the village: Großes Amt, Kleines Amt, Neustift am Alpenwald, Neuwald

- Breitenau
- Breitenstein
- Buchbach
- Bürg-Vöstenhof

Parts of the village: Bürg, Vöstenhof

- Edlitz
- Enzenreith

Parts of the village: Enzenreith, Hart, Hilzmannsdorf, Köttlach, Thürmannsdorf, Wörth

- Feistritz am Wechsel

Parts of the village: Feistritz am Wechsel, Grottendorf, Hasleiten, Hollabrunn

- Gloggnitz

Parts of the town: Abfaltersbach, Aue, Berglach, Eichberg, Gloggnitz (with Furth and Gföhl), Graben, Heufeld, Saloder, Stuppach, Weißenbach

- Grafenbach-Sankt Valentin

Parts of the village: Göttschach, Grafenbach, Ober-Danegg, Penk, St. Valentin-Landschach

- Grimmenstein

Parts of the village: Grimmenstein, Hochegg

- Grünbach am Schneeberg

Parts of the village: Grünbach am Schneeberg, Neusiedl am Walde

- Höflein an der Hohen Wand

Parts of the village: Oberhöflein, Unterhöflein, Zweiersdorf

- Kirchberg am Wechsel

Parts of the village: Alpeltal, Kirchberg (with Au, Markt, Molz, Rammergraben, Sachsenbrunn, Sellhof, Stein, Tratten, Weyer, Wieden Wiese), Kranichberg (with Baumtal, Eselberg, Friederdorf, Kiengraben, Oberer Kirchbgraben, Kreith, Kreithberg, Pucha, Pyhra, Rams), Lehen (Ortsteile Nebelsbach, Steinbach), Molzegg (with Kampsteiner Schwaig, Kreuzbauern, Molz, Steyersberger Schwaig), Ofenbach (with Eigenberg, Wieden)

- Mönichkirchen

Parts of the village: Am Hartberg, Feldbauern, Mönichkirchner Schwaig, Pfeffergraben, Tauchen, Unterhöfen

- Natschbach-Loipersbach

Parts of the village: Natschbach, Loipersbach (with Lindgrub)

- Neunkirchen

Parts of the town: Neunkirchen (with Innere Stadt, Tal, Steinplatte, Mühlfeld, Au, Steinfeld, Lerchenfeld, Blätterstraßensiedlung), Mollram, Peisching

- Otterthal
- Payerbach

Parts of the village: Geyerhof, Kreuzberg, Küb, Mühlhof, Payerbach, Pettenbach, Schmidsdorf, Schlöglmühl, Werning

- Pitten

Parts of the village: Pitten, Sautern, Leiding-Inzenhof

- Prigglitz

Parts of the village: Gasteil, Prigglitz, Stuppachgraben

- Puchberg am Schneeberg

Parts of the village: Knipflitz, Losenheim, Puchberg, Rohrbachgraben, Schneebergdörfl, Sonnenleiten, Stolzenwörth

- Raach am Hochgebirge

Parts of the village: Egg, Raach am Hochgebirge, Schlagl, Sonnleiten, Wartenstein

- Reichenau an der Rax

Parts of the village: Edlach, Grünsting, Hirschwang, Klein- und Großau, Prein, Reichenau

- Scheiblingkirchen-Thernberg

Parts of the village: Gleißenfeld, Reitersberg, Scheiblingkirchen, Thernberg, Witzelsberg

- Schottwien

Parts of the village: Göstritz, Greis, Schottwien

- Schrattenbach

Parts of the village: Greith, Gutenmann, Hornungstal, Rosental, Schrattenbach

- Schwarzau am Steinfeld

Parts of the village: Guntrams, Schwarzau am Steinfeld

- Schwarzau im Gebirge

Parts of the village: Gegend, Naßwald, Preintal, Vois

- Seebenstein

Parts of the village: Schiltern, Seebenstein, Sollgraben

- Semmering
- Sankt Corona am Wechsel
- Sankt Egyden am Steinfeld

Parts of the village: Gerasdorf am Steinfeld, Neusiedl am Steinfeld, Saubersdorf, St. Egyden am Steinfeld, Urschendorf

- Ternitz

Parts of the village: Dunkelstein, Flatz, Mahrersdorf, Pottschach, Putzmannsdorf, Raglitz, Rohrbach am Steinfelde, St. Johann am Steinfelde, Sieding,

- Thomasberg

Parts of the village: Königsberg, Kulma, Sauerbichl, Thomasberg

- Trattenbach
- Warth

Parts of the village: Haßbach, Kirchau, Kulm, Petersbaumgarten, Steyersberg, Thann, Warth

- Wartmannstetten

Parts of the village: Diepolz, Hafning, Ramplach, Straßhof (mit den Ortsteilen Straßhof, Gramatl, Weibnitz), Unter-Danegg und Wartmannstetten

- Willendorf

Parts of the village: Dörfles, Rothengrub, Strelzhof, Willendorf

- Wimpassing im Schwarzatale
- Würflach

Parts of the village: Hettmannsdorf, Wolfsohl, Würflach

- Zöbern

Parts of the village: Grünhöfen, Kampichl, Maierhöfen, Pichl, Schlag, Stübegg, Zöbern
