= Pitten =

- Municipality
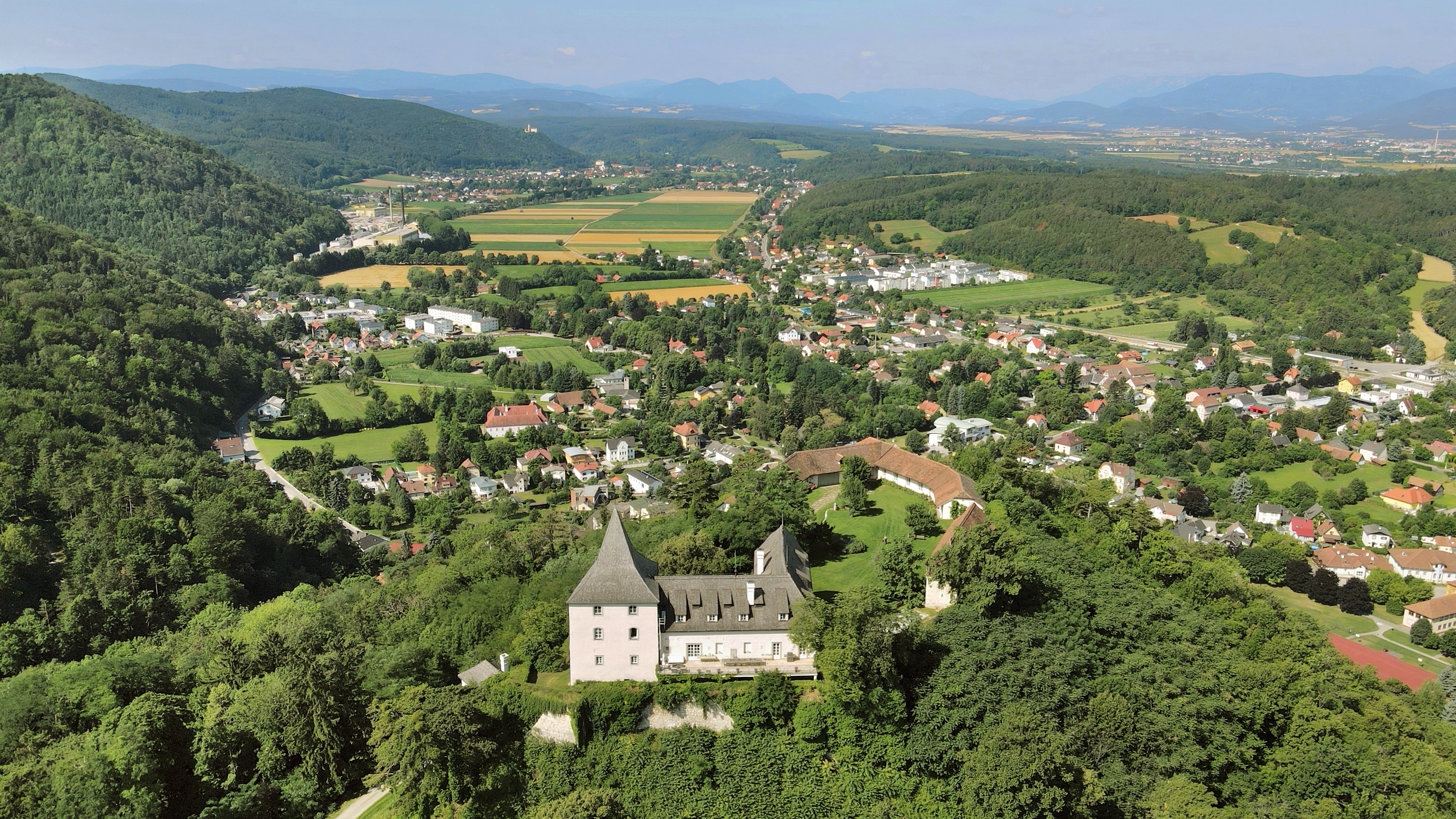
- East view of Pitten with castle

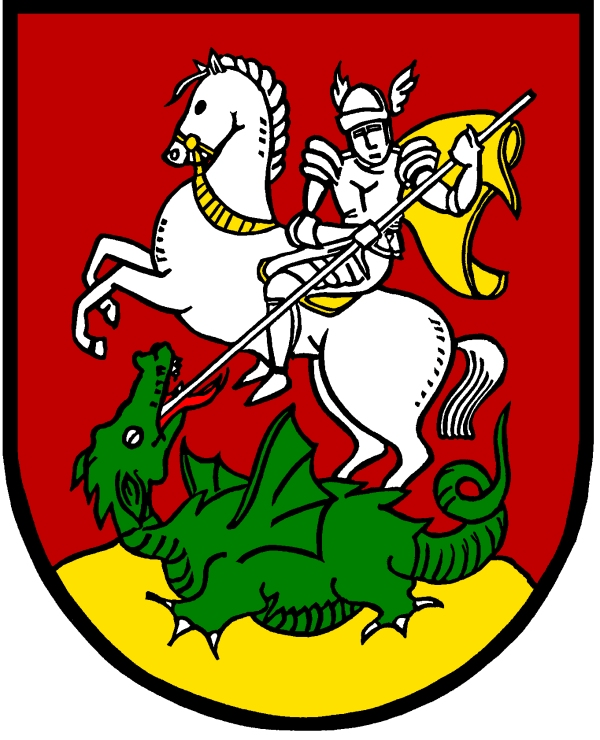
- Coat of arms

- Location within Austria
- Coordinates: 47°43′N 16°10′E
- Country: Austria
- State: Lower Austria
- District: Neunkirchen

Government
  - Mayor: Helmut Berger (SPÖ)

Area
  - Total: 13.08 km^{2} (5.05 sq mi)
- Elevation: 376 m (1,234 ft)

Population (2018-01-01)
  - Total: 2,697
  - Density: 206.2/km^{2} (534.0/sq mi)
- Time zone: UTC+1 (CET)
  - Summer (DST): UTC+2 (CEST)
- Postal code: 2823
- Area code: 02627
- Website: www.pitten.at

Pitten is a Market Municipality in the district of Neunkirchen in the Austrian state of Lower Austria.

== Geography ==
Pitten lies in the northern part of the "Bucklige Welt".

== Population ==
Historical population
| Year | Pop. | ±% |
|---|---|---|
| 1869 | 1,572 | — |
| 1880 | 1,850 | +17.7% |
| 1890 | 1,867 | +0.9% |
| 1900 | 2,123 | +13.7% |
| 1910 | 2,340 | +10.2% |
| 1923 | 2,491 | +6.5% |
| 1934 | 2,577 | +3.5% |
| 1939 | 2,469 | −4.2% |
| 1951 | 2,692 | +9.0% |
| 1961 | 2,540 | −5.6% |
| 1971 | 2,597 | +2.2% |
| 1981 | 2,498 | −3.8% |
| 1991 | 2,460 | −1.5% |
| 2001 | 2,473 | +0.5% |
| 2011 | 2,427 | −1.9% |

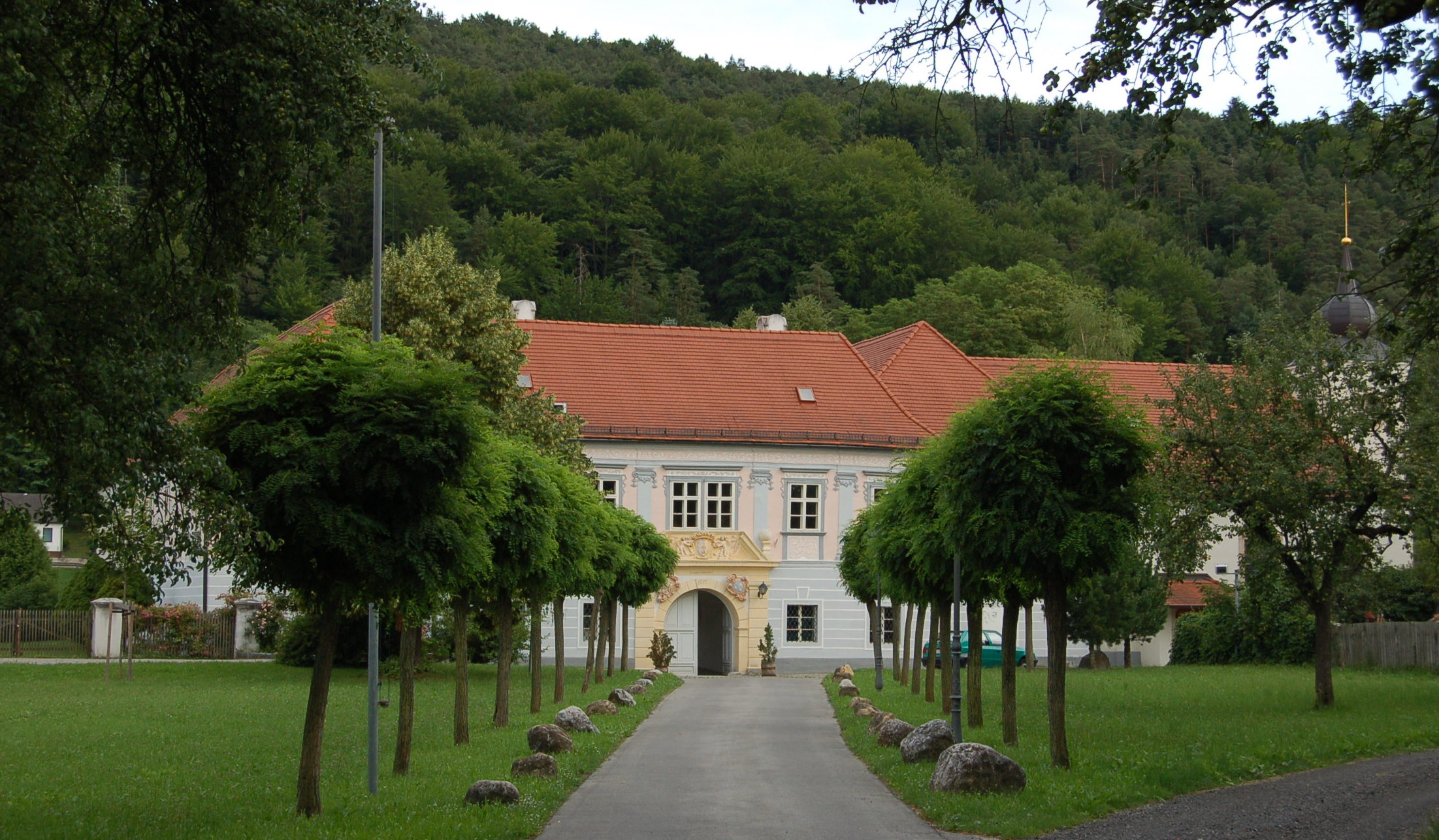
Parsonage

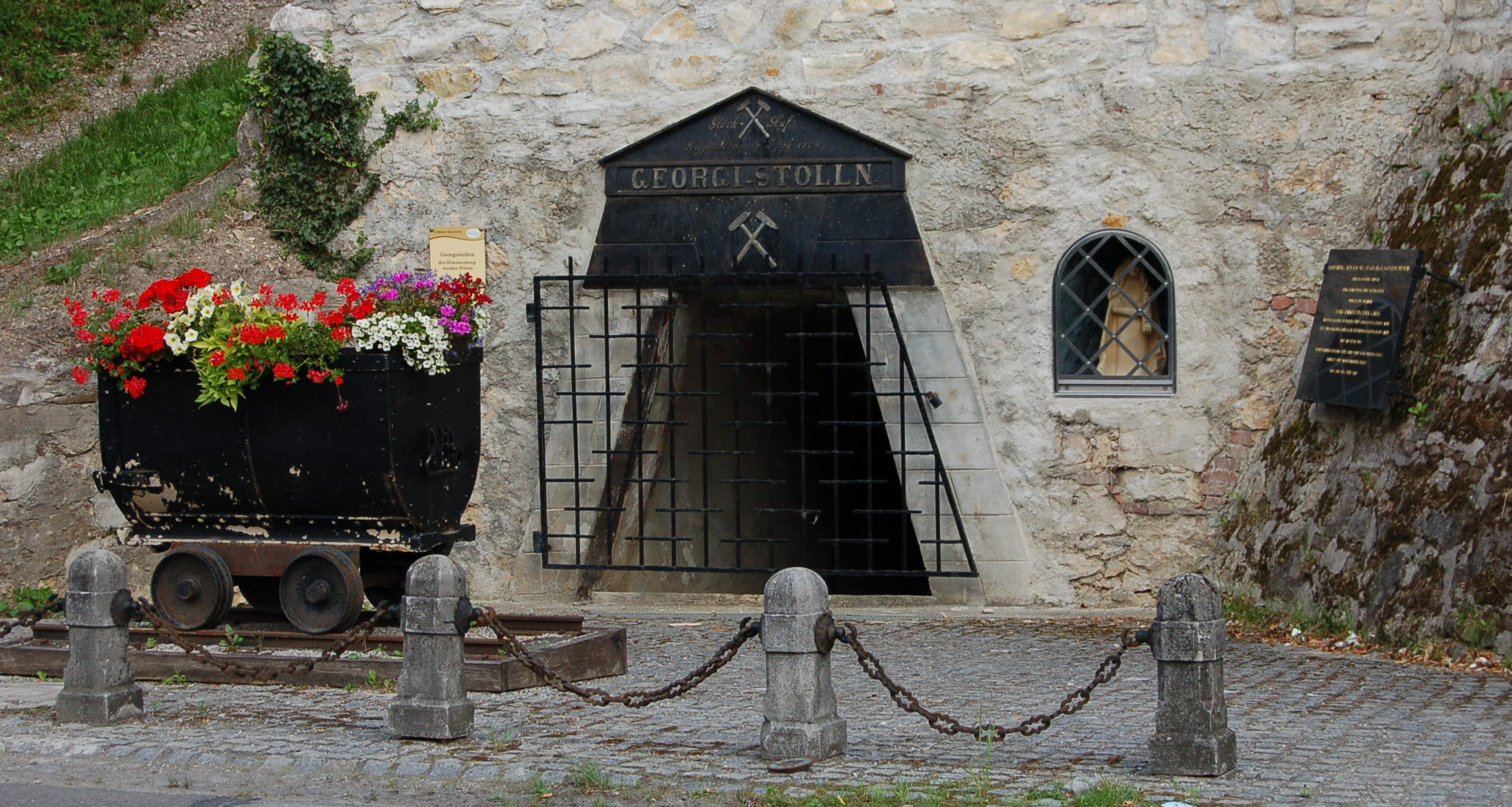
Closed down St. Georgi tunnel
