= Bürg-Vöstenhof =

- Municipality
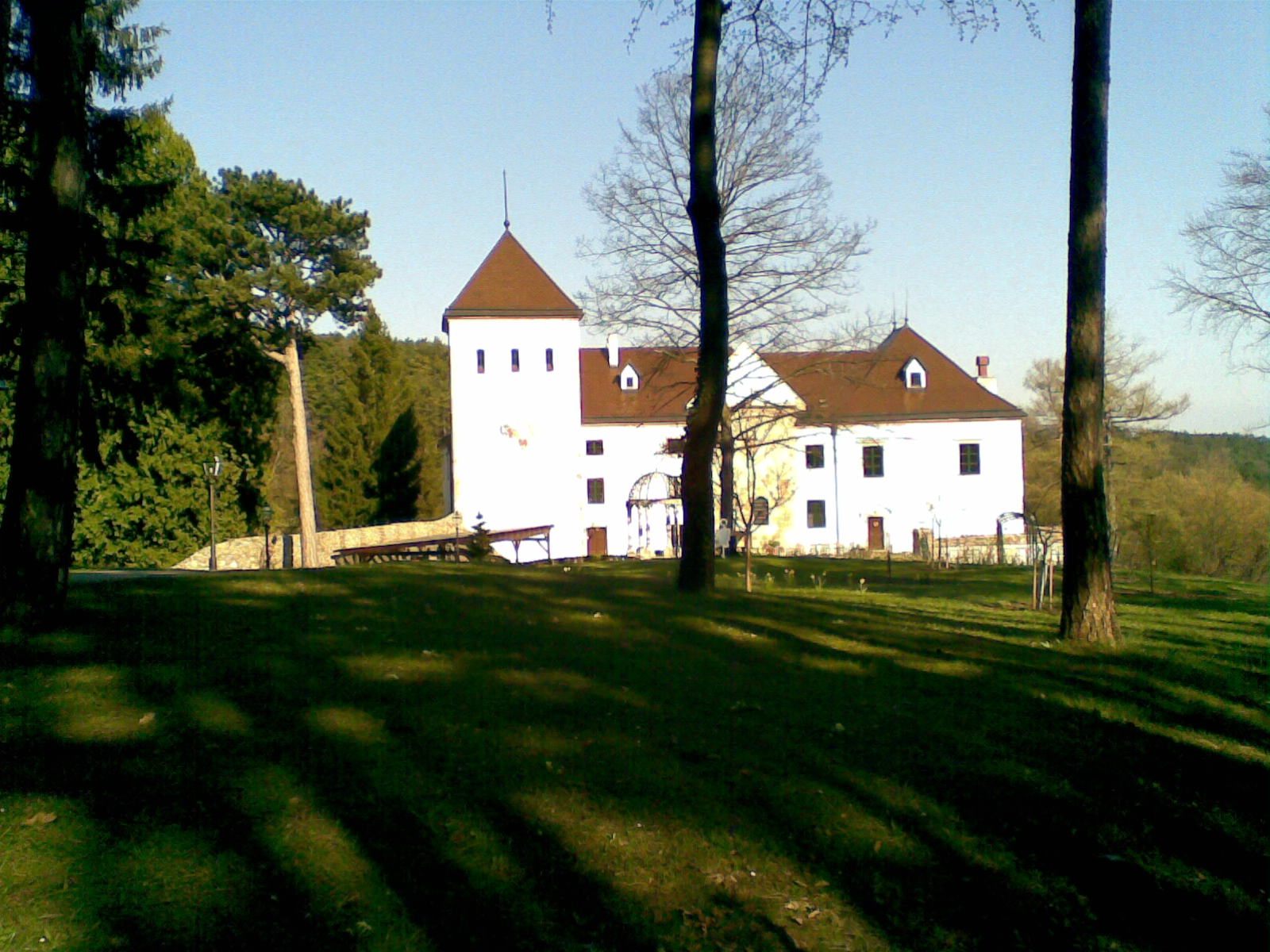
- Vöstenhof Castle

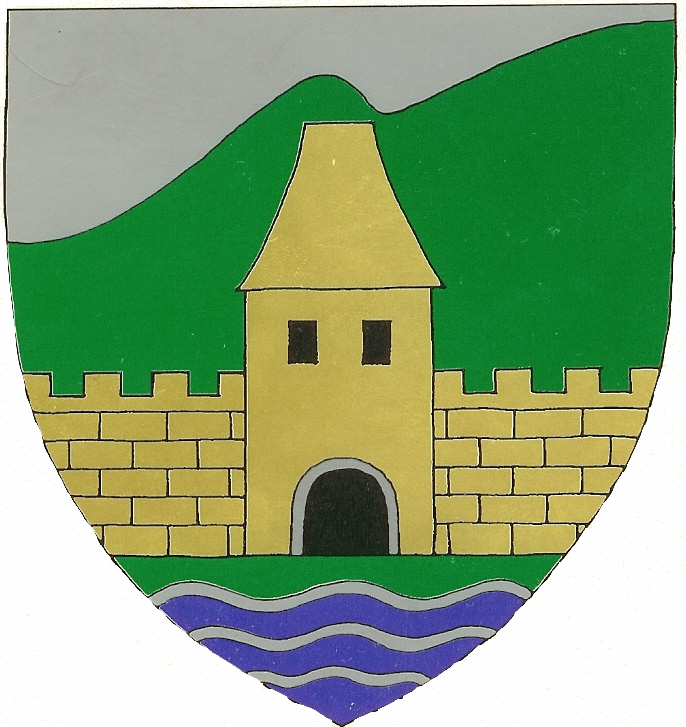
- Coat of arms

- Location within Austria
- Coordinates: 47°43′N 15°58′E
- Country: Austria
- State: Lower Austria
- District: Neunkirchen

Government
  - Mayor: Johann Hainfellner (ÖVP)

Area
  - Total: 25.16 km^{2} (9.71 sq mi)
- Elevation: 570 m (1,870 ft)

Population (2018-01-01)
  - Total: 179
  - Density: 7.11/km^{2} (18.4/sq mi)
- Time zone: UTC+1 (CET)
  - Summer (DST): UTC+2 (CEST)
- Postal code: 2630
- Area code: 02630

Bürg-Vöstenhof is a town in the district of Neunkirchen in the Austrian state of Lower Austria.

== Population ==
Historical population
Year	Pop.	±%
1869	221	—
1880	238	+7.7%
1890	216	−9.2%
1900	195	−9.7%
1910	191	−2.1%
1923	214	+12.0%
1934	192	−10.3%
1939	185	−3.6%
1951	165	−10.8%
1961	157	−4.8%
1971	172	+9.6%
1981	184	+7.0%
1991	179	−2.7%
2001	174	−2.8%
2011	174	+0.0%
