= Höflein an der Hohen Wand =

- Municipality
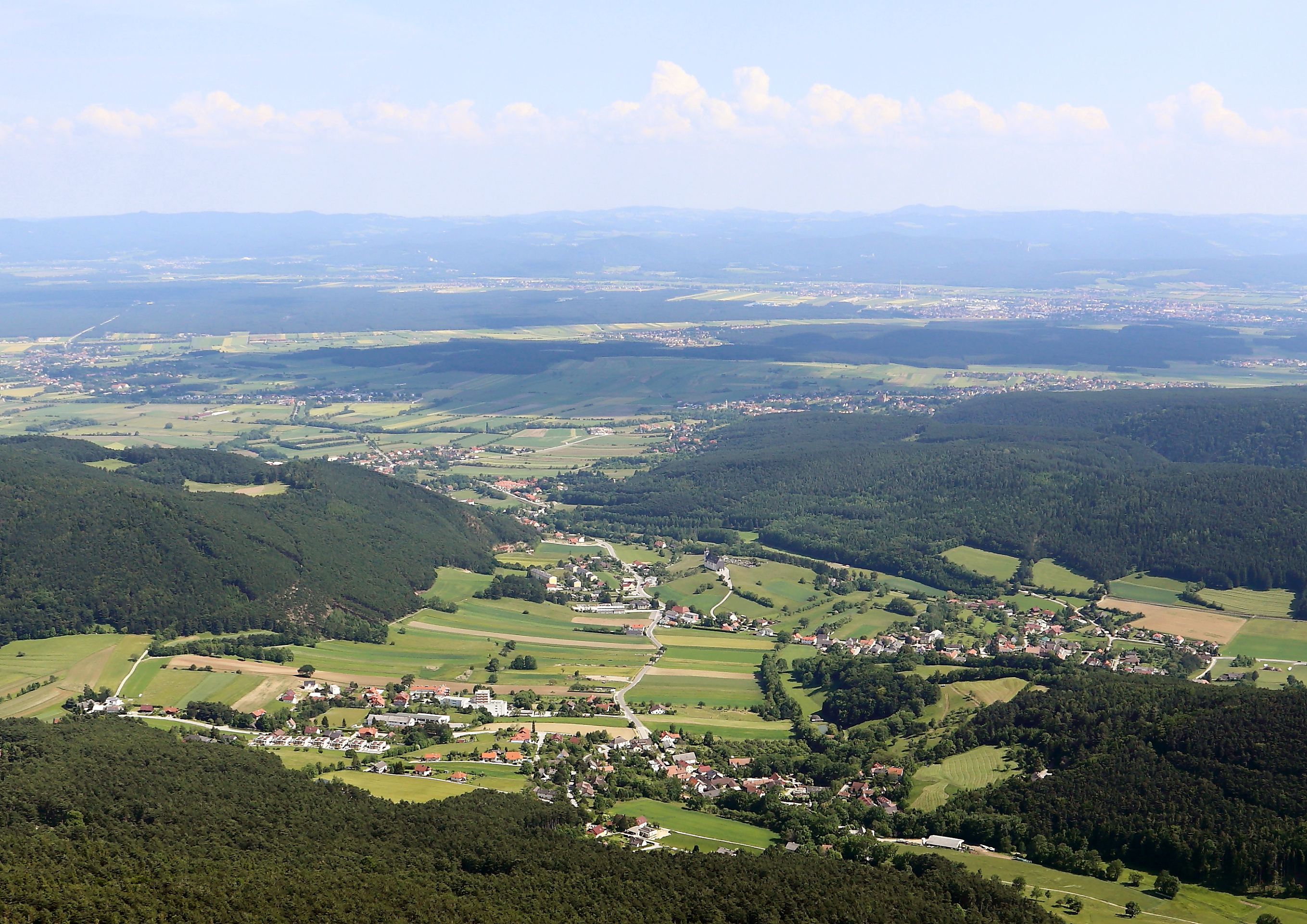
- View from Hohen Wand

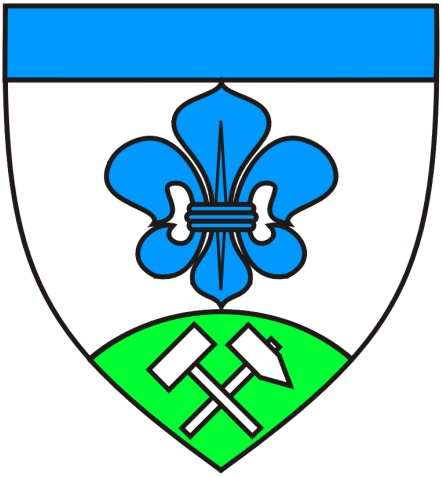
- Coat of arms

- Location within Austria
- Coordinates: 47°47′N 16°1′E
- Country: Austria
- State: Lower Austria
- District: Neunkirchen

Government
  - Mayor: Günther Stickler

Area
  - Total: 8.94 km^{2} (3.45 sq mi)
- Elevation: 490 m (1,610 ft)

Population (2018-01-01)
  - Total: 895
  - Density: 100/km^{2} (259/sq mi)
- Time zone: UTC+1 (CET)
  - Summer (DST): UTC+2 (CEST)
- Postal code: 2732
- Area code: 02620
- Website: www.hoeflein.com

Höflein an der Hohen Wand is a town in the district of Neunkirchen in the Austrian state of Lower Austria.

== Population ==
Historical population
Year	Pop.	±%
1869	452	—
1880	485	+7.3%
1890	545	+12.4%
1900	605	+11.0%
1910	694	+14.7%
1923	804	+15.9%
1934	792	−1.5%
1939	771	−2.7%
1951	724	−6.1%
1961	703	−2.9%
1971	769	+9.4%
1981	743	−3.4%
1991	717	−3.5%
2001	779	+8.6%
2011	868	+11.4%
