= Grafenbach-St. Valentin =

- Municipality
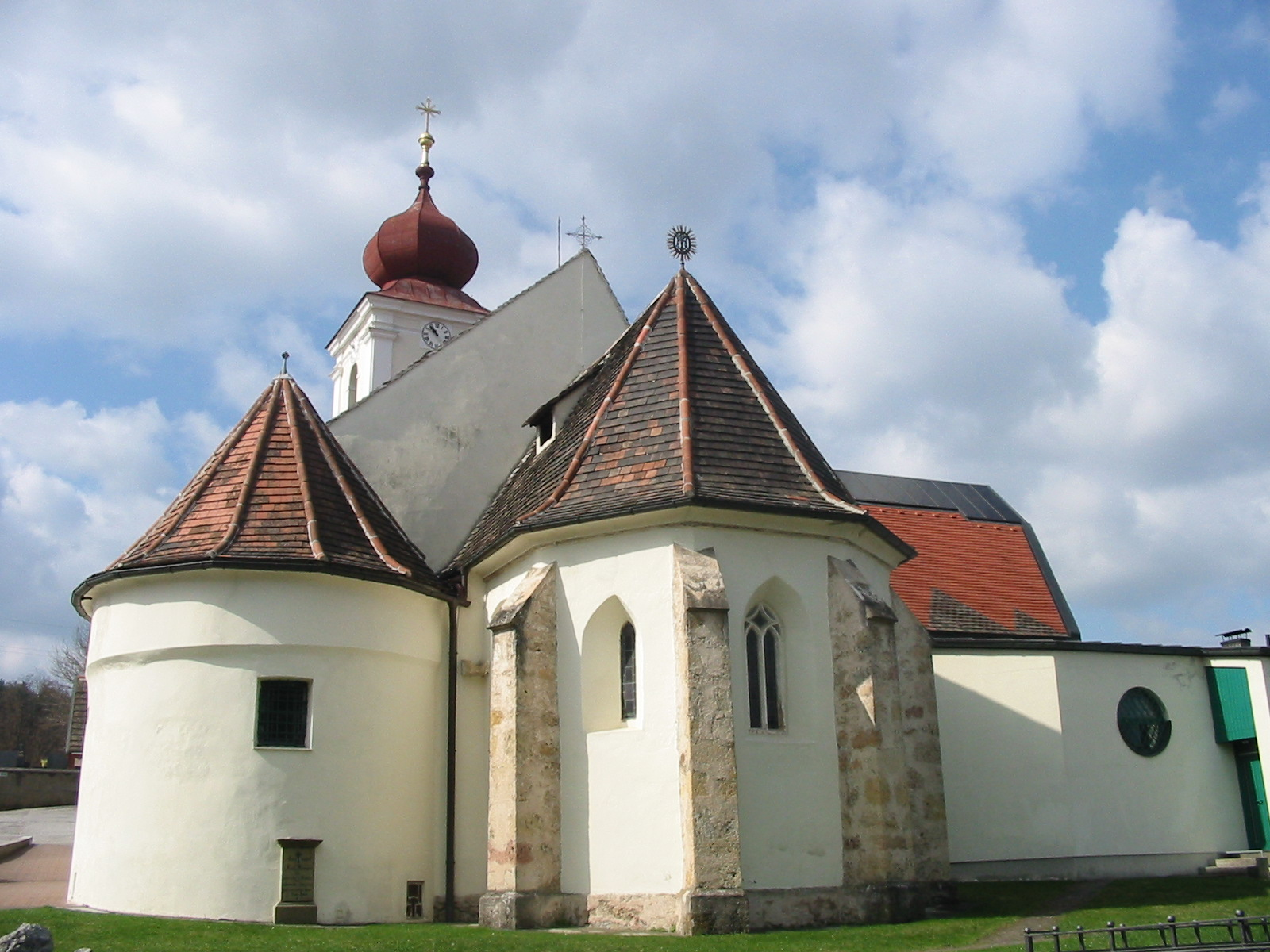
- The parish church

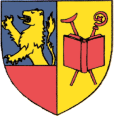
- Coat of arms

- Location within Austria
- Coordinates: 47°41′N 16°0′E
- Country: Austria
- State: Lower Austria
- District: Neunkirchen

Government
  - Mayor: Sylivia Kögler (SPÖ)

Area
  - Total: 13.9 km^{2} (5.4 sq mi)
- Elevation: 430 m (1,410 ft)

Population (2018-01-01)
  - Total: 2,264
  - Density: 163/km^{2} (422/sq mi)
- Time zone: UTC+1 (CET)
  - Summer (DST): UTC+2 (CEST)
- Postal code: 2632
- Area code: 02630
- Vehicle registration: NK
- Website: www.grafenbach.at

Grafenbach-Sankt Valentin is a town in the district of Neunkirchen in the Austrian state of Lower Austria.

== Geography ==
Grafenbach_St. Valtentin lies southwest of Ternitz in the Schwarzatal. It has an area of 13.9 km^{2}. 15.54% of its area is forested.

== History ==
In ancient times, the municipality was part of the Roman province of Noricum. There is a 9th-century burial ground near Grafenbach.

== Population ==
Historical population
Year	Pop.	±%
1869	746	—
1880	895	+20.0%
1890	1,198	+33.9%
1900	1,466	+22.4%
1910	1,755	+19.7%
1923	1,698	−3.2%
1934	1,762	+3.8%
1939	1,786	+1.4%
1951	1,746	−2.2%
1961	1,856	+6.3%
1971	2,003	+7.9%
1981	1,969	−1.7%
1991	2,233	+13.4%
2001	2,303	+3.1%
2011	2,248	−2.4%
