= Enzenreith =

Municipality in Lower Austria, Austria

- Municipality
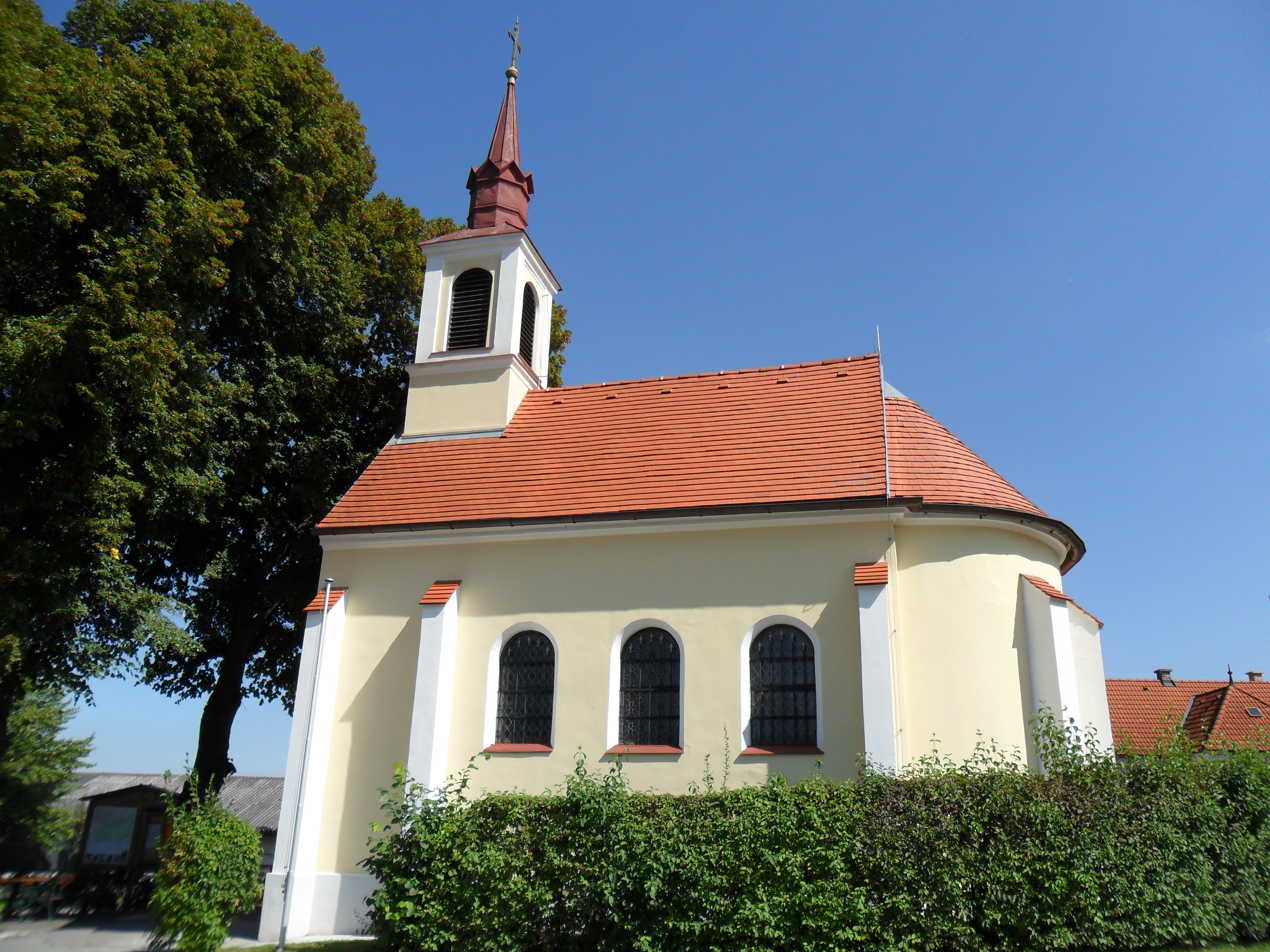
- The church in Köttlach (part of Enzenreith)

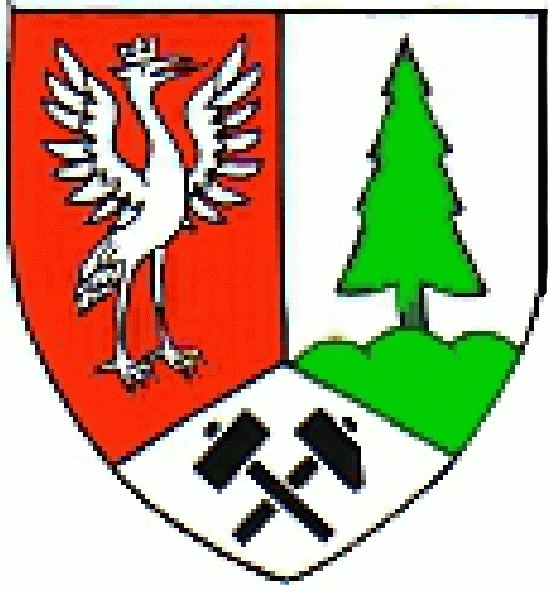
- Coat of arms

- Location within Austria
- Coordinates: 47°40′N 15°57′E
- Country: Austria
- State: Lower Austria
- District: Neunkirchen

Government
  - Mayor: Dirk Rath (SPÖ)

Area
  - Total: 9.21 km^{2} (3.56 sq mi)
- Elevation: 450 m (1,480 ft)

Population (2018-01-01)
  - Total: 1,946
  - Density: 211/km^{2} (547/sq mi)
- Time zone: UTC+1 (CET)
  - Summer (DST): UTC+2 (CEST)
- Postal code: 2640
- Area code: 02662
- Website: www.gemeinde-enzenreith.at

Enzenreith is a municipality in the district of Neunkirchen in the Austrian state of Lower Austria.

== Population ==
Historical population
Year	Pop.	±%
1869	943	—
1880	882	−6.5%
1890	979	+11.0%
1900	1,007	+2.9%
1910	1,155	+14.7%
1923	1,480	+28.1%
1934	1,624	+9.7%
1939	1,663	+2.4%
1951	1,642	−1.3%
1961	1,426	−13.2%
1971	1,653	+15.9%
1981	1,770	+7.1%
1991	1,892	+6.9%
2001	1,909	+0.9%
2011	1,879	−1.6%
