= Zöbern =

- Municipality
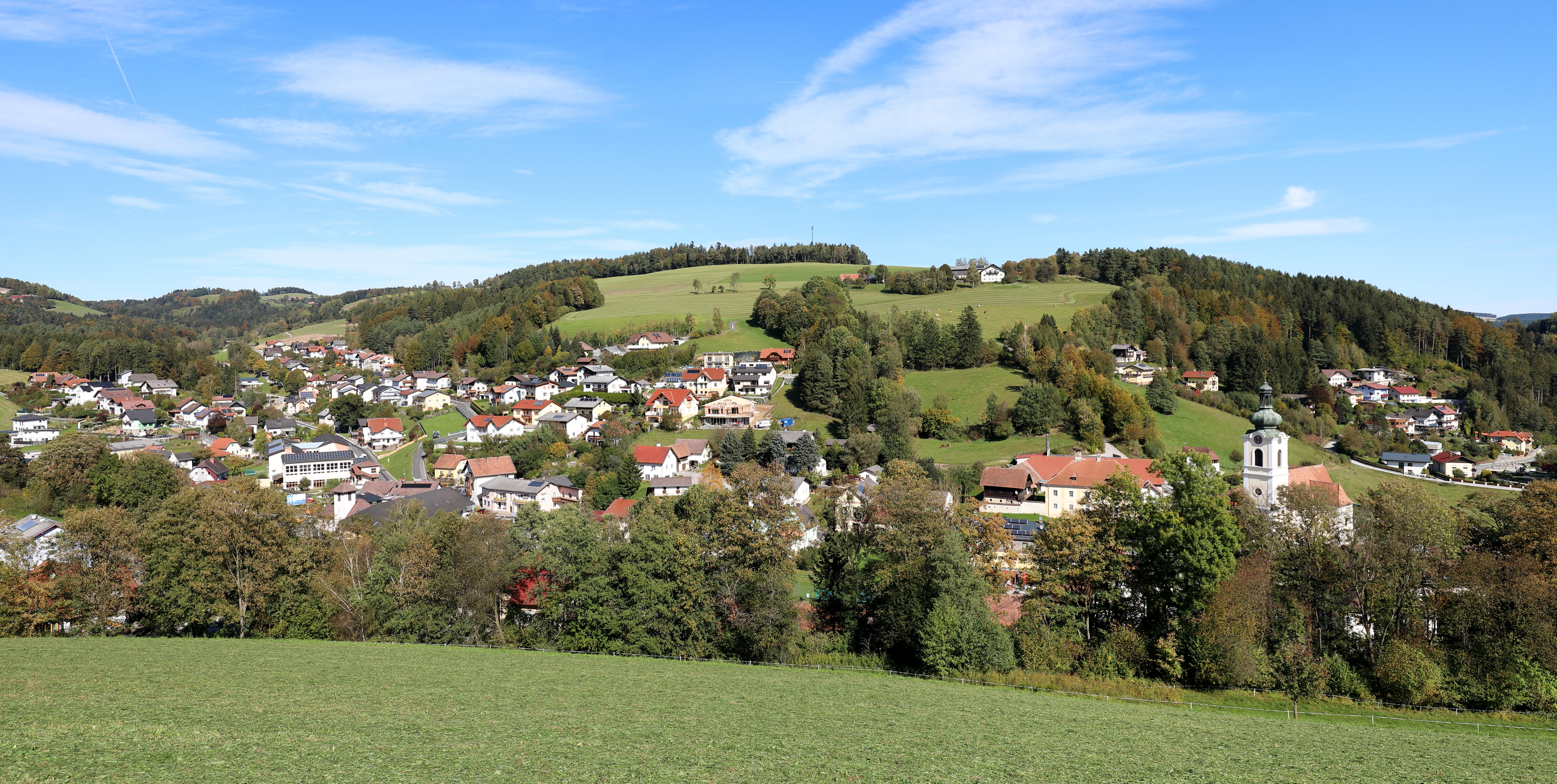
- South view of Zöbern

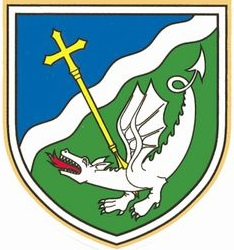
- Coat of arms

- Location within Austria
- Coordinates: 47°30′N 16°7′E
- Country: Austria
- State: Lower Austria
- District: Neunkirchen

Government
  - Mayor: Alfred Brandstätter

Area
  - Total: 31.56 km^{2} (12.19 sq mi)
- Elevation: 591 m (1,939 ft)

Population (2018-01-01)
  - Total: 1,423
  - Density: 45.09/km^{2} (116.8/sq mi)
- Time zone: UTC+1 (CET)
  - Summer (DST): UTC+2 (CEST)
- Postal code: 2871
- Area code: 02642
- Website: http://www.zoebern.at

Zöbern is a town in the district of Neunkirchen in the Austrian state of Lower Austria.

== Population ==
Historical population
Year	Pop.	±%
1971	1,316	—
1981	1,334	+1.4%
1991	1,438	+7.8%
2001	1,466	+1.9%
