= Buchbach, Austria =

Buchbach
- Municipality
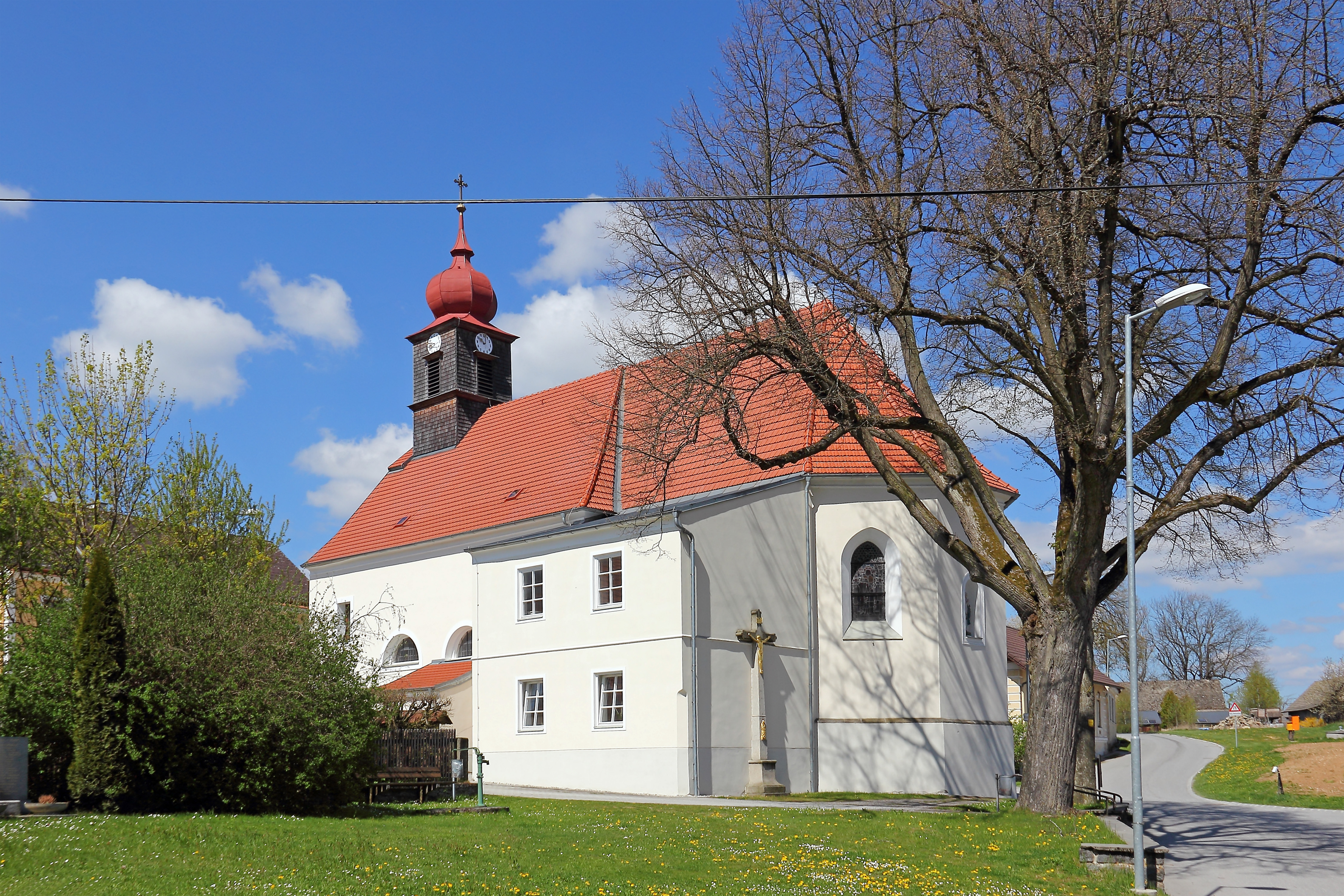
- St. Florian church in Buchbach, Austria

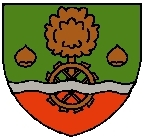
- Coat of arms

- Location within Austria
- Coordinates: 47°41′N 15°59′E
- Country: Austria
- State: Lower Austria
- District: Neunkirchen

Government
  - Mayor: Doris Kampichler (SPÖ)

Area
  - Total: 2.99 km^{2} (1.15 sq mi)
- Elevation: 357 m (1,171 ft)

Population (2018-01-01)
  - Total: 330
  - Density: 110/km^{2} (290/sq mi)
- Time zone: UTC+1 (CET)
  - Summer (DST): UTC+2 (CEST)
- Postal code: 2630
- Area code: 02630
- Website: www.buchbach-liesing.at

Buchbach (German pronunciation: [ˈbuːxbax]) is a village in the district of Neunkirchen in the Austrian state of Lower Austria.

== Population ==
Historical population
Year	Pop.	±%
1869	218	—
1880	359	+64.7%
1890	455	+26.7%
1900	451	−0.9%
1910	450	−0.2%
1923	425	−5.6%
1934	404	−4.9%
1939	388	−4.0%
1951	377	−2.8%
1961	369	−2.1%
1971	307	−16.8%
1981	308	+0.3%
1991	324	+5.2%
2001	357	+10.2%
2011	346	−3.1%
