= Warth, Lower Austria =

Warth
- Municipality
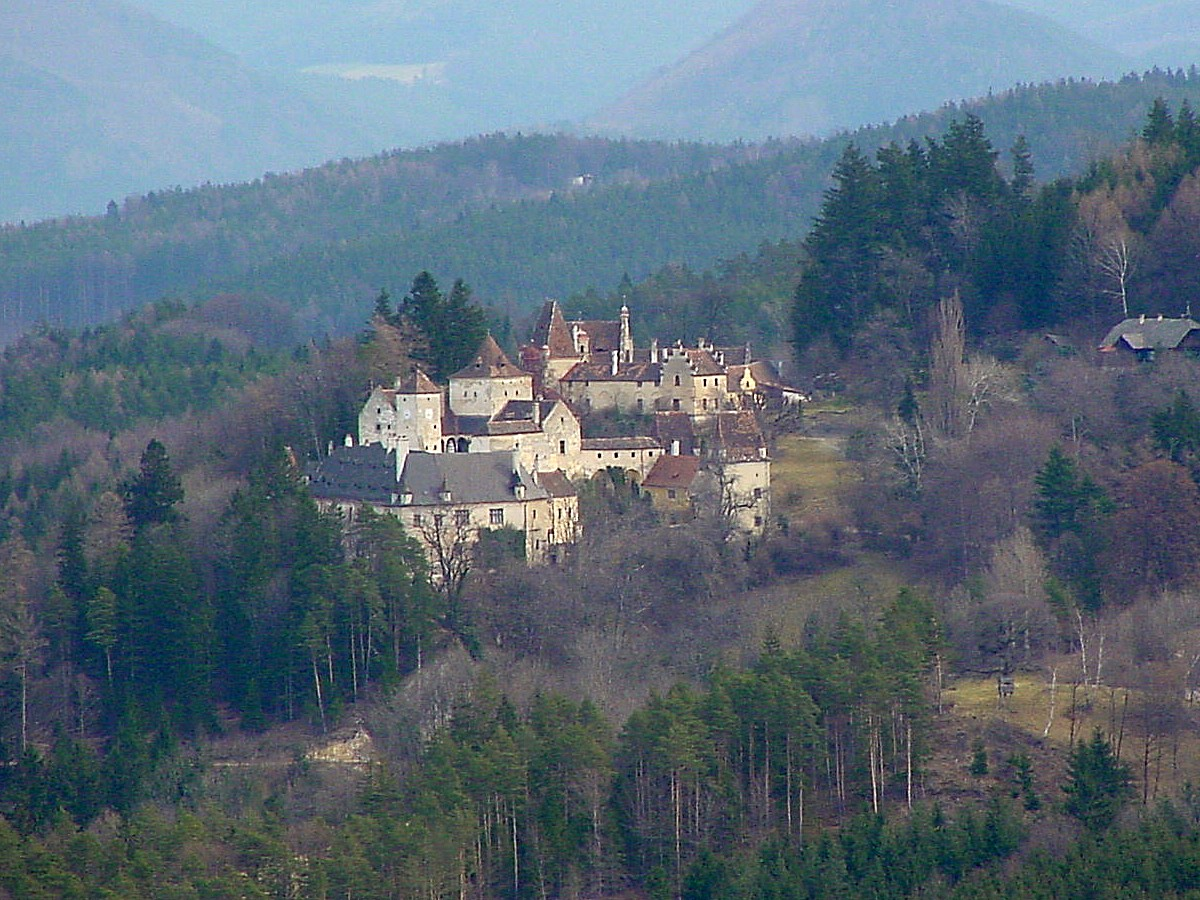
- Steyersberg Castle in Warth

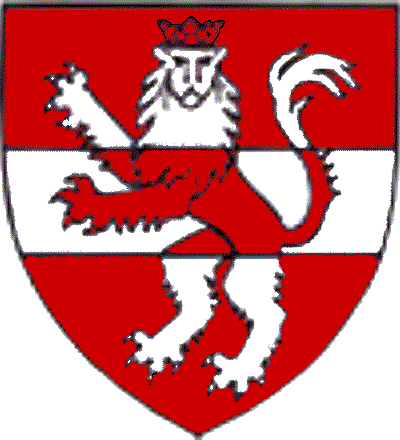
- Coat of arms

- Location within Austria
- Coordinates: 47°39′N 16°07′E
- Country: Austria
- State: Lower Austria
- District: Neunkirchen

Government
  - Mayor: Michaela Walla

Area
  - Total: 29.97 km^{2} (11.57 sq mi)
- Elevation: 385 m (1,263 ft)

Population (2018-01-01)
  - Total: 1,512
  - Density: 50.45/km^{2} (130.7/sq mi)
- Time zone: UTC+1 (CET)
  - Summer (DST): UTC+2 (CEST)
- Postal code: 2831
- Area code: 02629
- Website: http://www.warth-noe.gv.at

Warth is a town in the district of Neunkirchen in the Austrian state of Lower Austria.

It consists of seven localities (in brackets population as of 1 January 2016):

- Haßbach (227)
- Kirchau (294)
- Kulm (70)
- Petersbaumgarten (266)
- Steyersberg (75)
- Thann (42)
- Warth (547)

== Population ==
Historical population
| Year | Pop. | ±% |
|---|---|---|
| 1869 | 1,407 | — |
| 1880 | 1,421 | +1.0% |
| 1890 | 1,457 | +2.5% |
| 1900 | 1,499 | +2.9% |
| 1910 | 1,683 | +12.3% |
| 1923 | 1,660 | −1.4% |
| 1934 | 1,671 | +0.7% |
| 1939 | 1,610 | −3.7% |
| 1951 | 1,564 | −2.9% |
| 1961 | 1,485 | −5.1% |
| 1971 | 1,446 | −2.6% |
| 1981 | 1,503 | +3.9% |
| 1991 | 1,573 | +4.7% |
| 2001 | 1,617 | +2.8% |
| 2011 | 1,522 | −5.9% |

== Notable people ==
The philosopher Ludwig Wittgenstein briefly taught at a secondary school in Haßbach in the autumn of 1922.
