= Wimpassing im Schwarzatale =

- Municipality
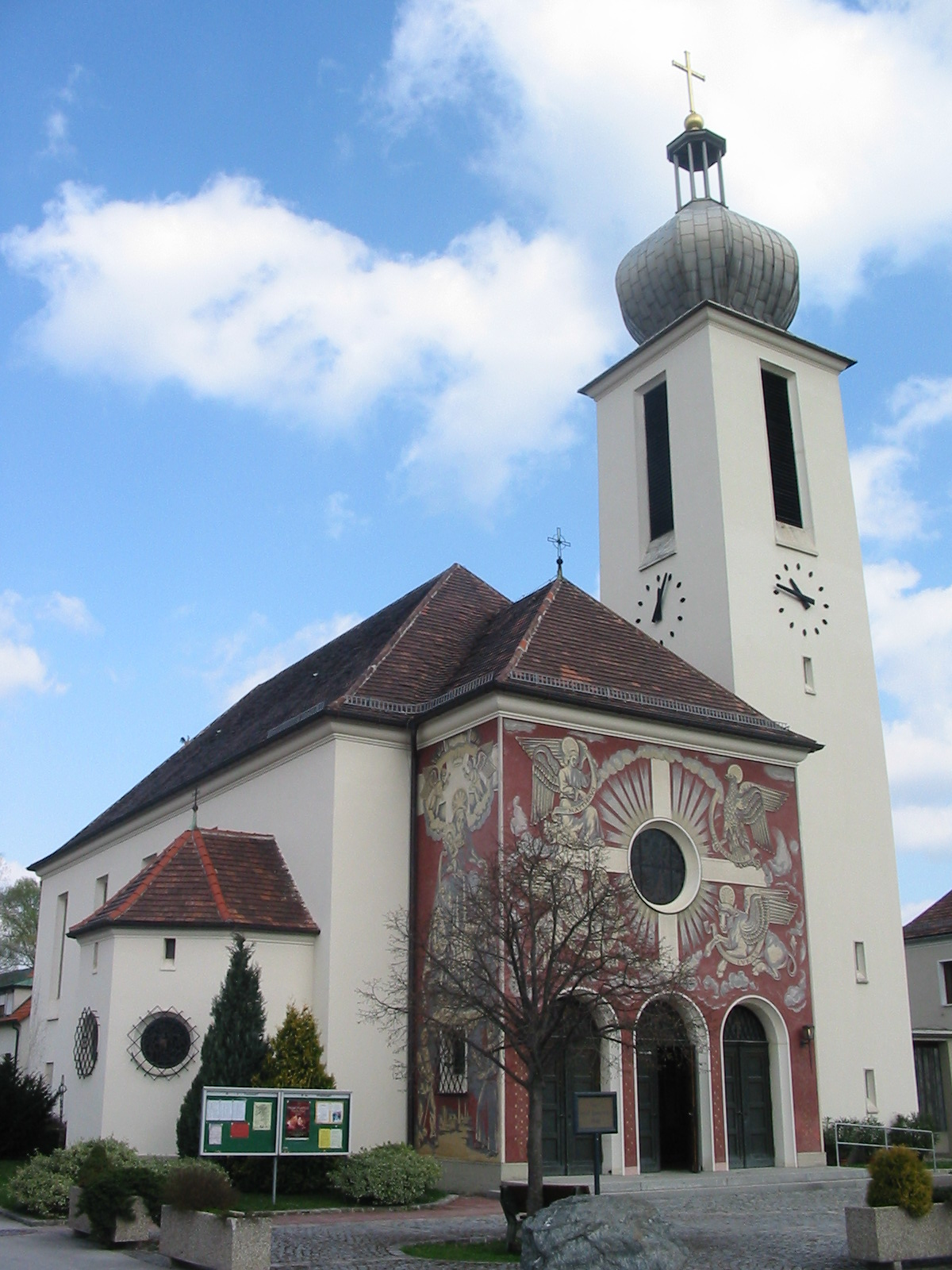
- Wimpassing parish church

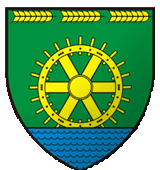
- Coat of arms

- Location within Austria
- Coordinates: 47°42′N 16°1′E
- Country: Austria
- State: Lower Austria
- District: Neunkirchen

Government
  - Mayor: Walter Jeitler

Area
  - Total: 2.07 km^{2} (0.80 sq mi)
- Elevation: 396 m (1,299 ft)

Population (2018-01-01)
  - Total: 1,616
  - Density: 781/km^{2} (2,020/sq mi)
- Time zone: UTC+1 (CET)
  - Summer (DST): UTC+2 (CEST)
- Postal code: 2632
- Area code: 02630
- Website: https://www.wimpassing.at

Wimpassing im Schwarzatale is a town in the district of Neunkirchen in the Austrian state of Lower Austria.

It lies on the main route to Vienna.

== Population ==
Historical population
Year	Pop.	±%
1869	766	—
1880	1,268	+65.5%
1890	1,393	+9.9%
1900	1,863	+33.7%
1910	1,924	+3.3%
1923	1,818	−5.5%
1934	2,105	+15.8%
1939	2,148	+2.0%
1951	1,799	−16.2%
1961	2,066	+14.8%
1971	2,021	−2.2%
1981	2,066	+2.2%
1991	2,007	−2.9%
2001	1,915	−4.6%
2011	1,720	−10.2%
