= St. Corona am Wechsel =

Sankt Corona am Wechsel
- Municipality
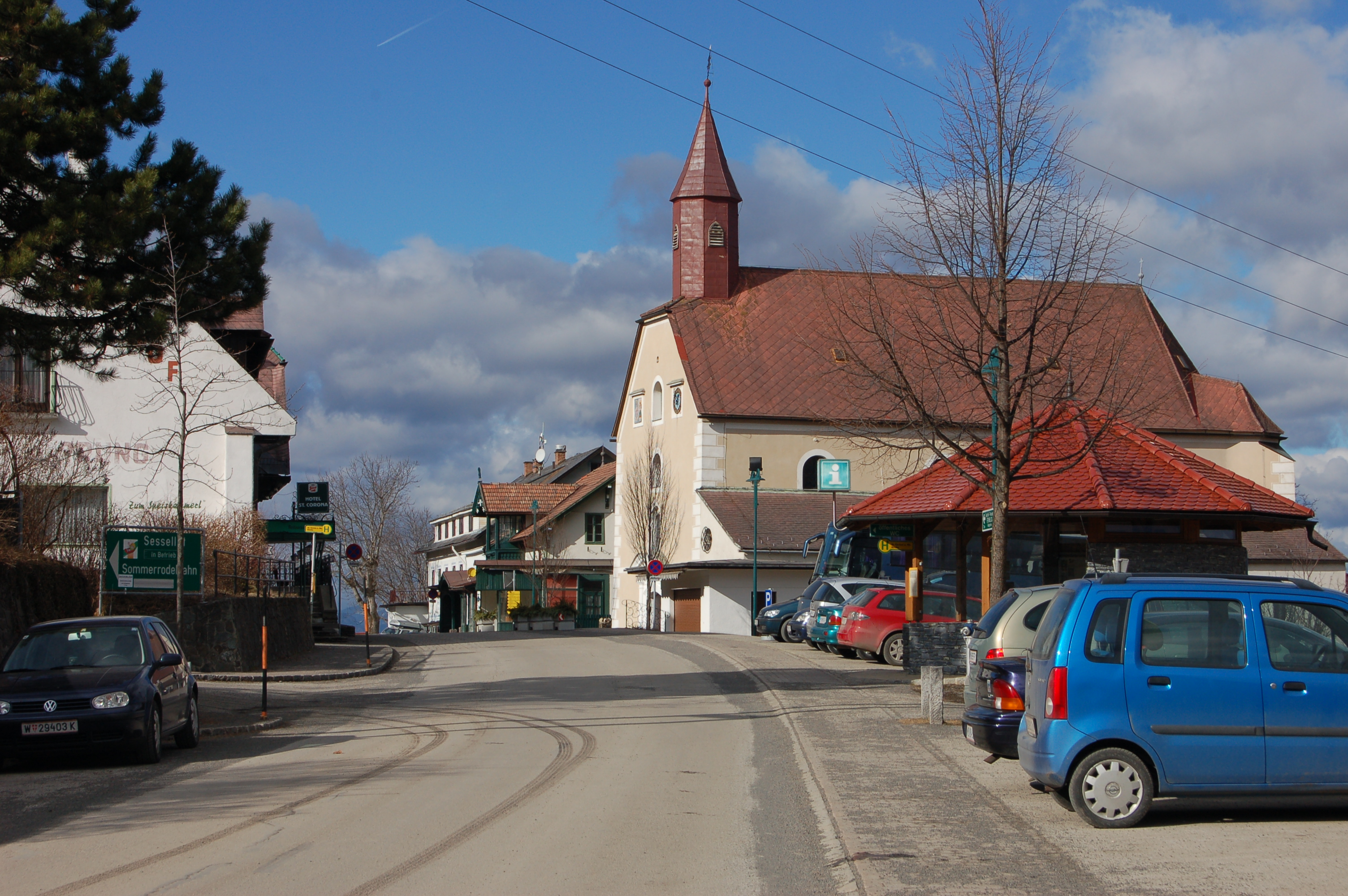
- Main street

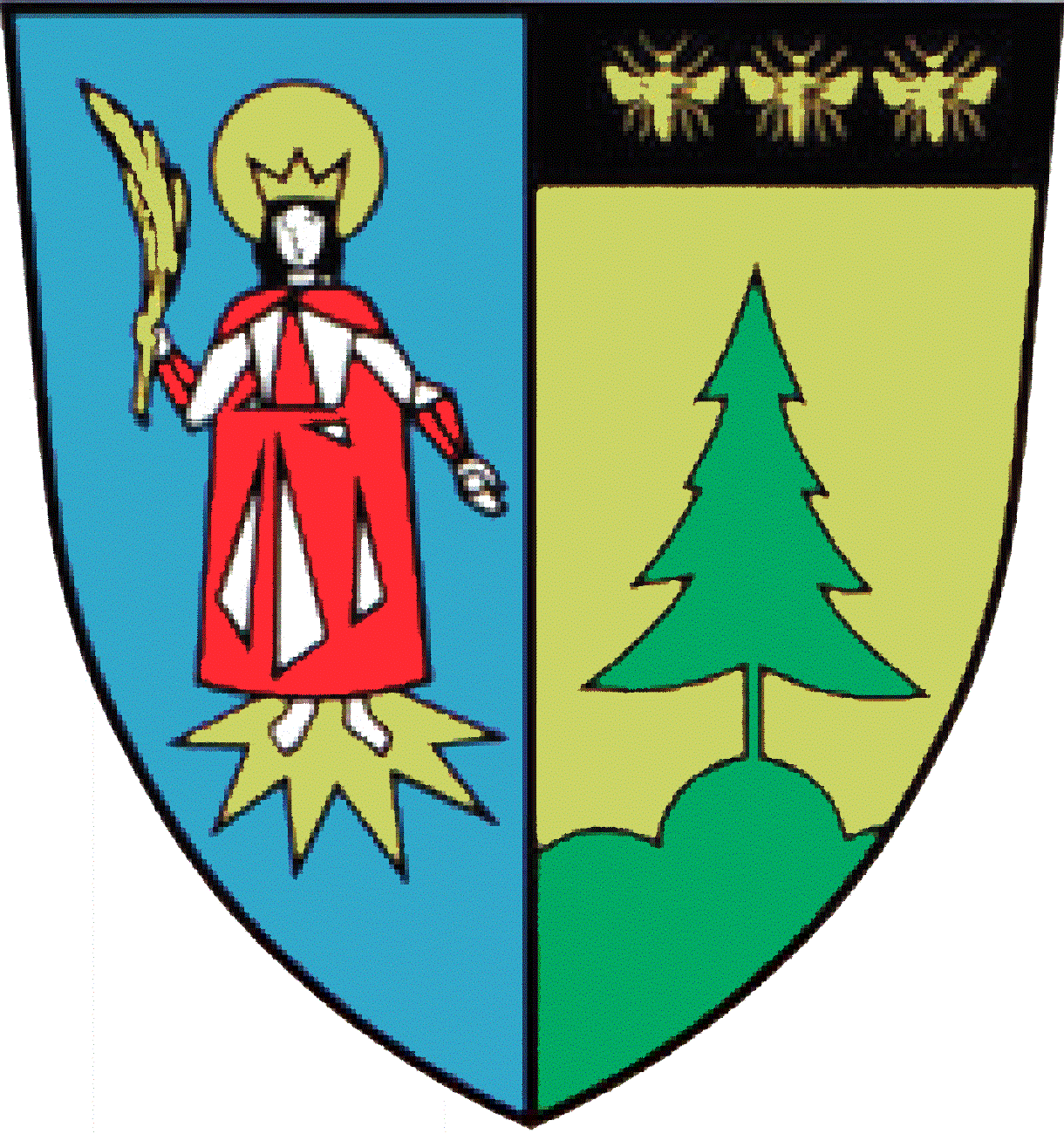
- Coat of arms

- Location within Austria
- Coordinates: 47°35′N 16°0′E
- Country: Austria
- State: Lower Austria
- District: Neunkirchen

Government
  - Mayor: Michael Gruber (ÖVP)

Area
  - Total: 8.7 km^{2} (3.4 sq mi)
- Elevation: 844 m (2,769 ft)

Population (2018-01-01)
  - Total: 390
  - Density: 45/km^{2} (120/sq mi)
- Time zone: UTC+1 (CET)
  - Summer (DST): UTC+2 (CEST)
- Postal code: 2870, 2880
- Area code: +43 2641
- Website: www.st-corona-wechsel.gv.at

Sankt Corona am Wechsel is a town in the district of Neunkirchen in the Austrian state of Lower Austria.

== Population ==
Historical population
Year	Pop.	±%
1869	344	—
1880	319	−7.3%
1890	299	−6.3%
1900	299	+0.0%
1910	292	−2.3%
1923	342	+17.1%
1934	305	−10.8%
1939	319	+4.6%
1951	301	−5.6%
1961	313	+4.0%
1971	308	−1.6%
1981	326	+5.8%
1991	384	+17.8%
2001	364	−5.2%
2011	381	+4.7%
