= Thomasberg =

- Municipality
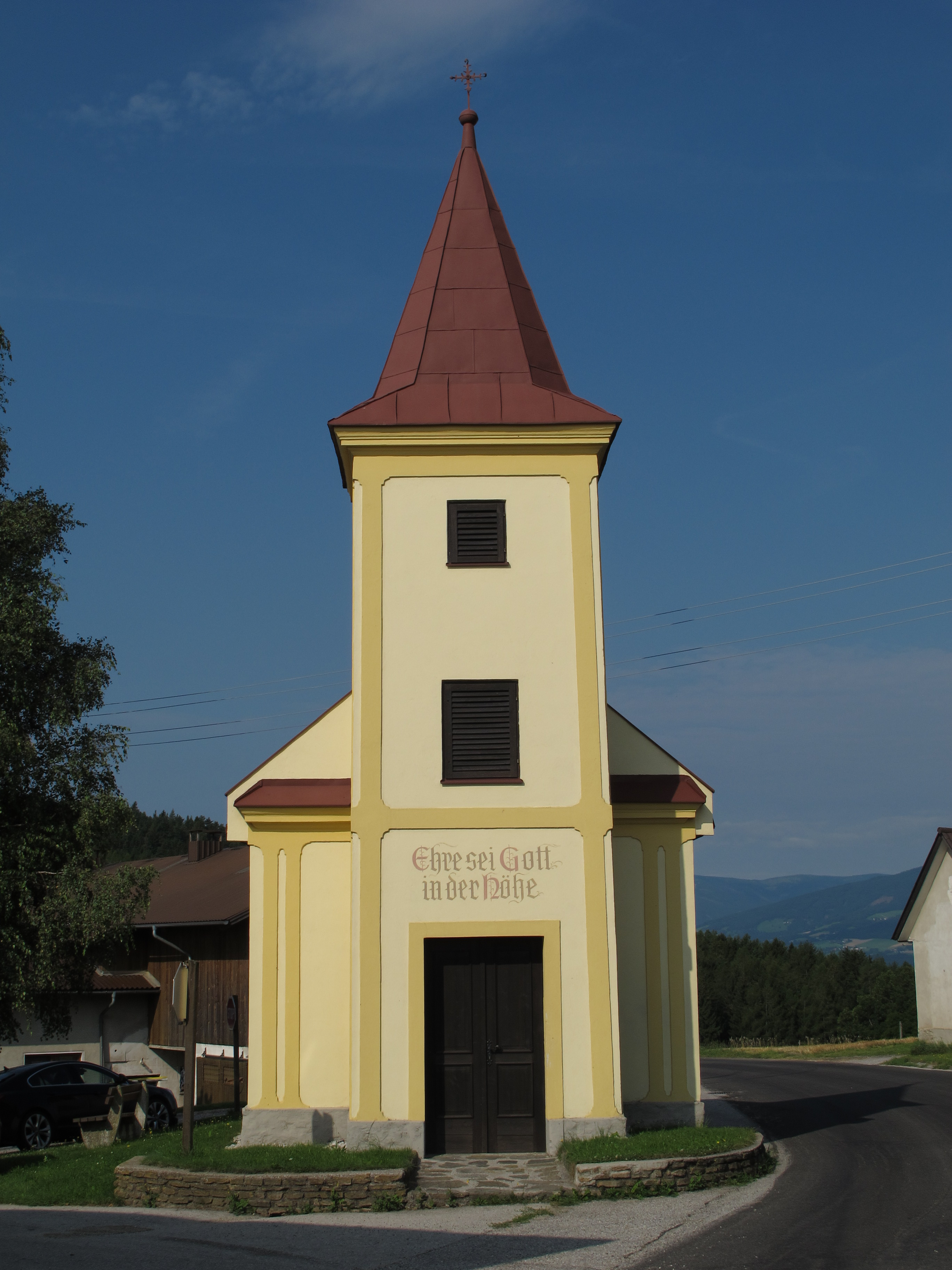
- Wiesfleck chapel in Thomasberg

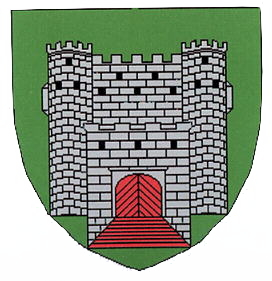
- Coat of arms

- Location within Austria
- Coordinates: 47°34′N 16°8′E
- Country: Austria
- State: Lower Austria
- District: Neunkirchen

Government
  - Mayor: Engelbert Ringhofer

Area
  - Total: 28.99 km^{2} (11.19 sq mi)
- Elevation: 541 m (1,775 ft)

Population (2018-01-01)
  - Total: 1,284
  - Density: 44.29/km^{2} (114.7/sq mi)
- Time zone: UTC+1 (CET)
  - Summer (DST): UTC+2 (CEST)
- Postal code: 2840
- Area code: 02644

Thomasberg is a town in the district of Neunkirchen in the Austrian state of Lower Austria.

== Population ==
Historical population
Year	Pop.	±%
1869	1,331	—
1880	1,472	+10.6%
1890	1,385	−5.9%
1900	1,354	−2.2%
1910	1,420	+4.9%
1923	1,389	−2.2%
1934	1,392	+0.2%
1939	1,316	−5.5%
1951	1,252	−4.9%
1961	1,310	+4.6%
1971	1,319	+0.7%
1981	1,359	+3.0%
1991	1,262	−7.1%
2001	1,239	−1.8%
2011	1,212	−2.2%
