= Würflach =

- Municipality
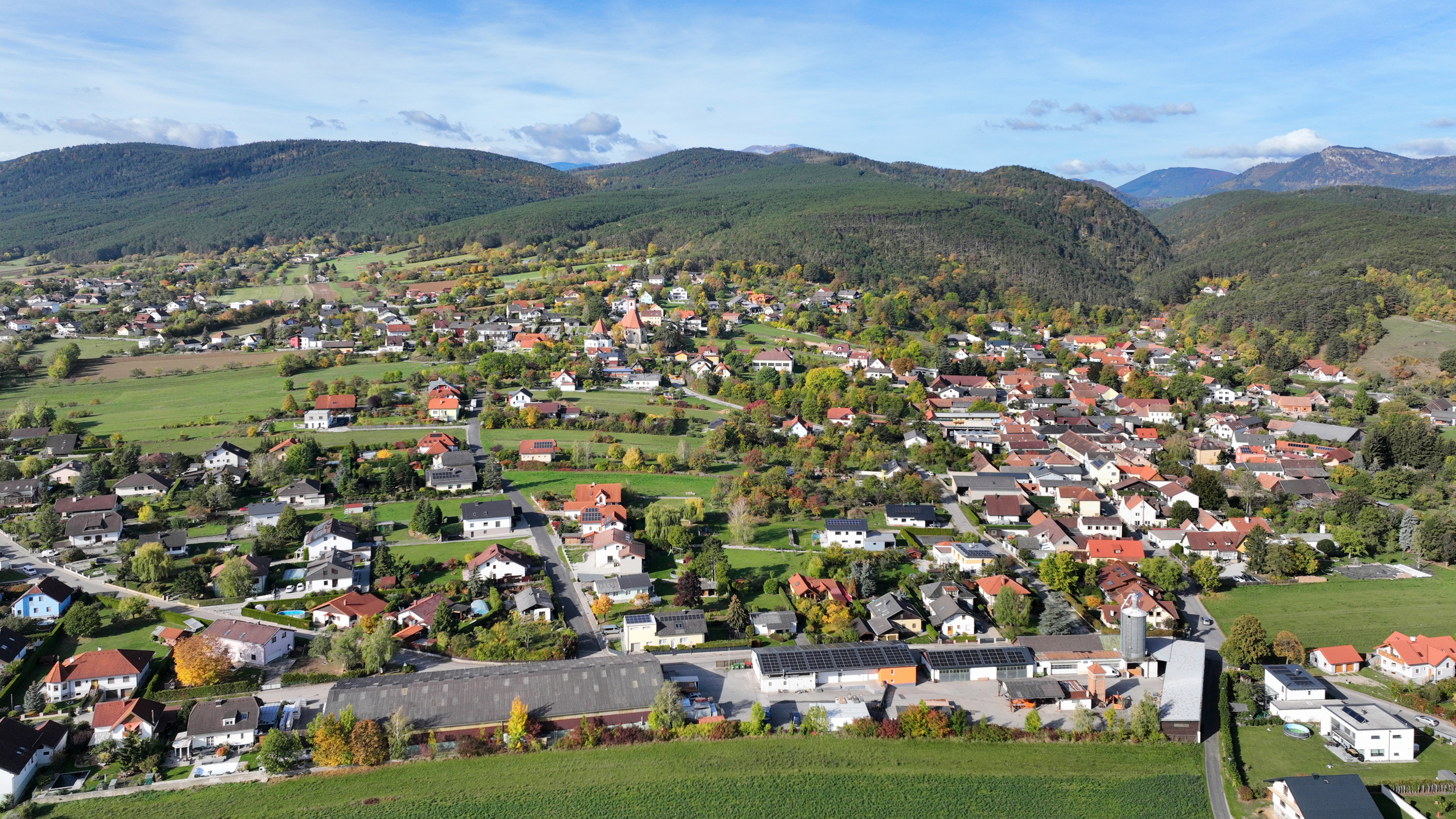
- East view of Würflach

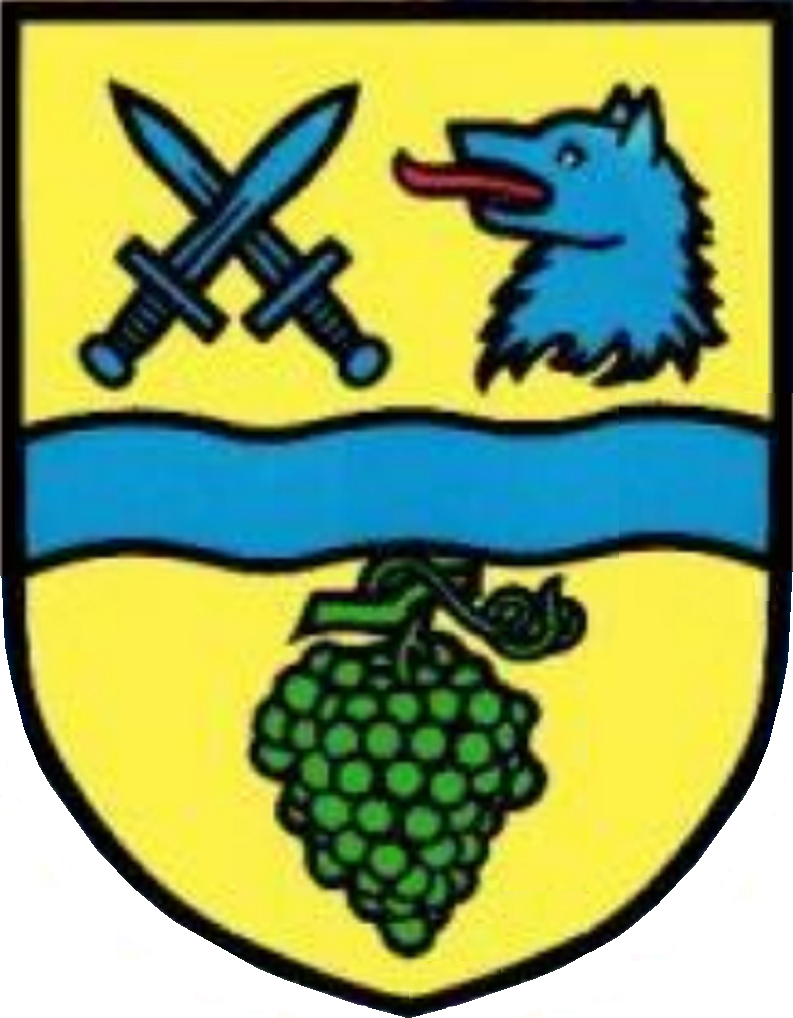
- Coat of arms

- Location within Austria
- Coordinates: 47°47′N 16°3′E
- Country: Austria
- State: Lower Austria
- District: Neunkirchen

Government
  - Mayor: Franz Woltron (ÖVP)

Area
  - Total: 12.33 km^{2} (4.76 sq mi)
- Elevation: 430 m (1,410 ft)

Population (2018-01-01)
  - Total: 1,592
  - Density: 129.1/km^{2} (334.4/sq mi)
- Time zone: UTC+1 (CET)
  - Summer (DST): UTC+2 (CEST)
- Postal code: 2732
- Area code: +43 2630
- Website: http://www.wuerflach.at

Würflach is a town in the district of Neunkirchen in the Austrian state of Lower Austria.

== Population ==
Historical population
Year	Pop.	±%
1869	710	—
1880	765	+7.7%
1890	819	+7.1%
1900	833	+1.7%
1910	894	+7.3%
1923	918	+2.7%
1934	918	+0.0%
1939	937	+2.1%
1951	1,000	+6.7%
1961	1,037	+3.7%
1971	1,146	+10.5%
1981	1,251	+9.2%
1991	1,313	+5.0%
2001	1,483	+12.9%
2011	1,581	+6.6%
