= Wartmannstetten =

- Municipality
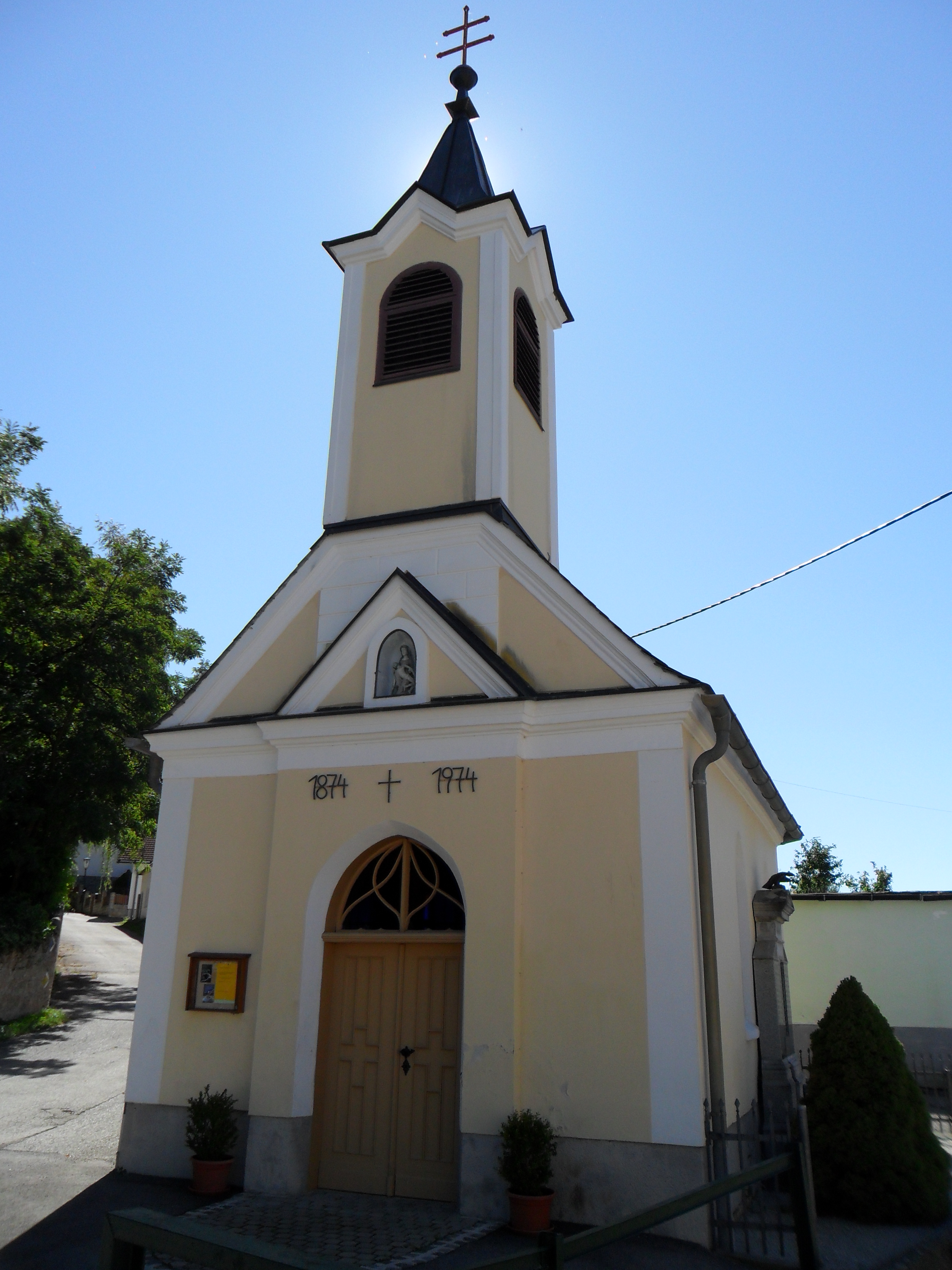
- Chapel in Rampach (part of Wartmannstetten)

- Coat of arms

- Location within Austria
- Coordinates: 47°41′N 16°4′E
- Country: Austria
- State: Lower Austria
- District: Neunkirchen

Government
  - Mayor: Franz Hubinger

Area
  - Total: 21.41 km^{2} (8.27 sq mi)
- Elevation: 419 m (1,375 ft)

Population (2018-01-01)
  - Total: 1,605
  - Density: 74.96/km^{2} (194.2/sq mi)
- Time zone: UTC+1 (CET)
  - Summer (DST): UTC+2 (CEST)
- Postal code: 2620
- Area code: 02635
- Website: www.wartmannstetten.gv.at

Wartmannstetten is a town in the district of Neunkirchen in the Austrian state of Lower Austria.

== Population ==
Historical population
Year	Pop.	±%
1880	1,241	—
1890	1,405	+13.2%
1900	1,419	+1.0%
1910	1,489	+4.9%
1923	1,439	−3.4%
1934	1,363	−5.3%
1939	1,305	−4.3%
1951	1,224	−6.2%
1961	1,168	−4.6%
1971	1,241	+6.2%
1981	1,271	+2.4%
1991	1,426	+12.2%
2001	1,675	+17.5%
2011	1,606	−4.1%
