= St. Egyden am Steinfeld =

Sankt Egyden am Steinfeld
- Municipality
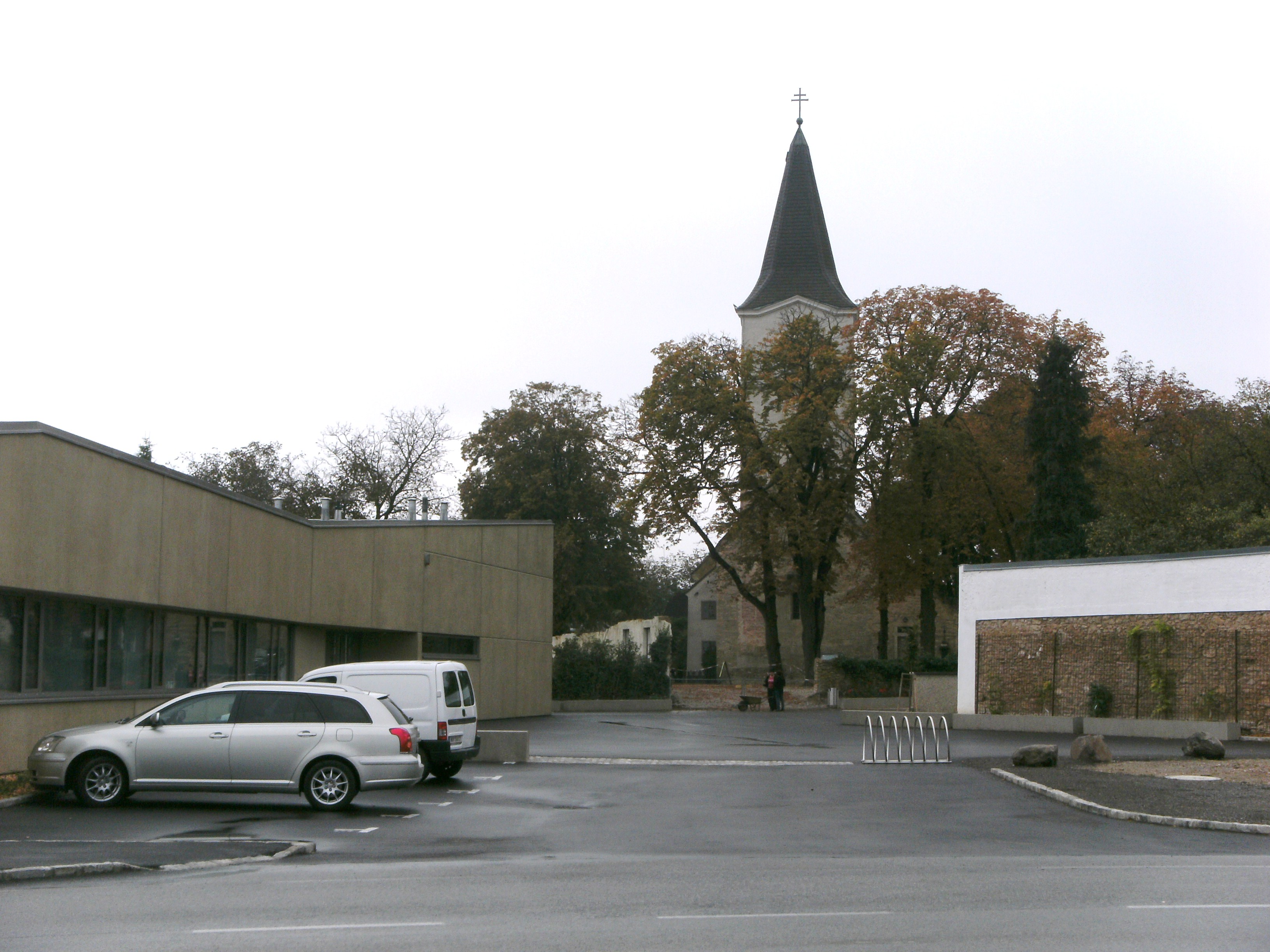
- Church of Saint Giles

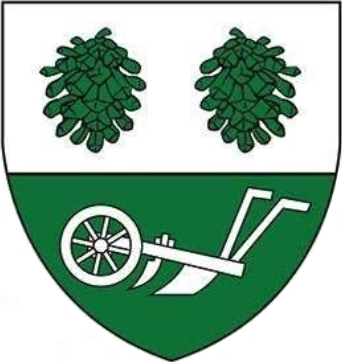
- Coat of arms

- Location within Austria
- Coordinates: 47°46′N 16°6′E
- Country: Austria
- State: Lower Austria
- District: Neunkirchen

Government
  - Mayor: Wilhelm Terler (ÖVP)

Area
  - Total: 26.17 km^{2} (10.10 sq mi)
- Elevation: 350 m (1,150 ft)

Population (2018-01-01)
  - Total: 1,924
  - Density: 73.52/km^{2} (190.4/sq mi)
- Time zone: UTC+1 (CET)
  - Summer (DST): UTC+2 (CEST)
- Postal code: 2731
- Area code: 02638
- Website: http://www.st-egyden.at/

Sankt Egyden am Steinfeld is a town in the district of Neunkirchen in the Austrian state of Lower Austria.

== Population ==
Historical population
Year	Pop.	±%
1869	1,250	—
1880	1,388	+11.0%
1890	1,619	+16.6%
1900	1,656	+2.3%
1910	1,823	+10.1%
1923	1,783	−2.2%
1934	1,577	−11.6%
1939	1,520	−3.6%
1951	1,491	−1.9%
1961	1,445	−3.1%
1971	1,506	+4.2%
1981	1,559	+3.5%
1991	1,671	+7.2%
2001	1,785	+6.8%
2011	1,898	+6.3%
