= Feistritz am Wechsel =

Town in Lower Austria, Austria

- Municipality
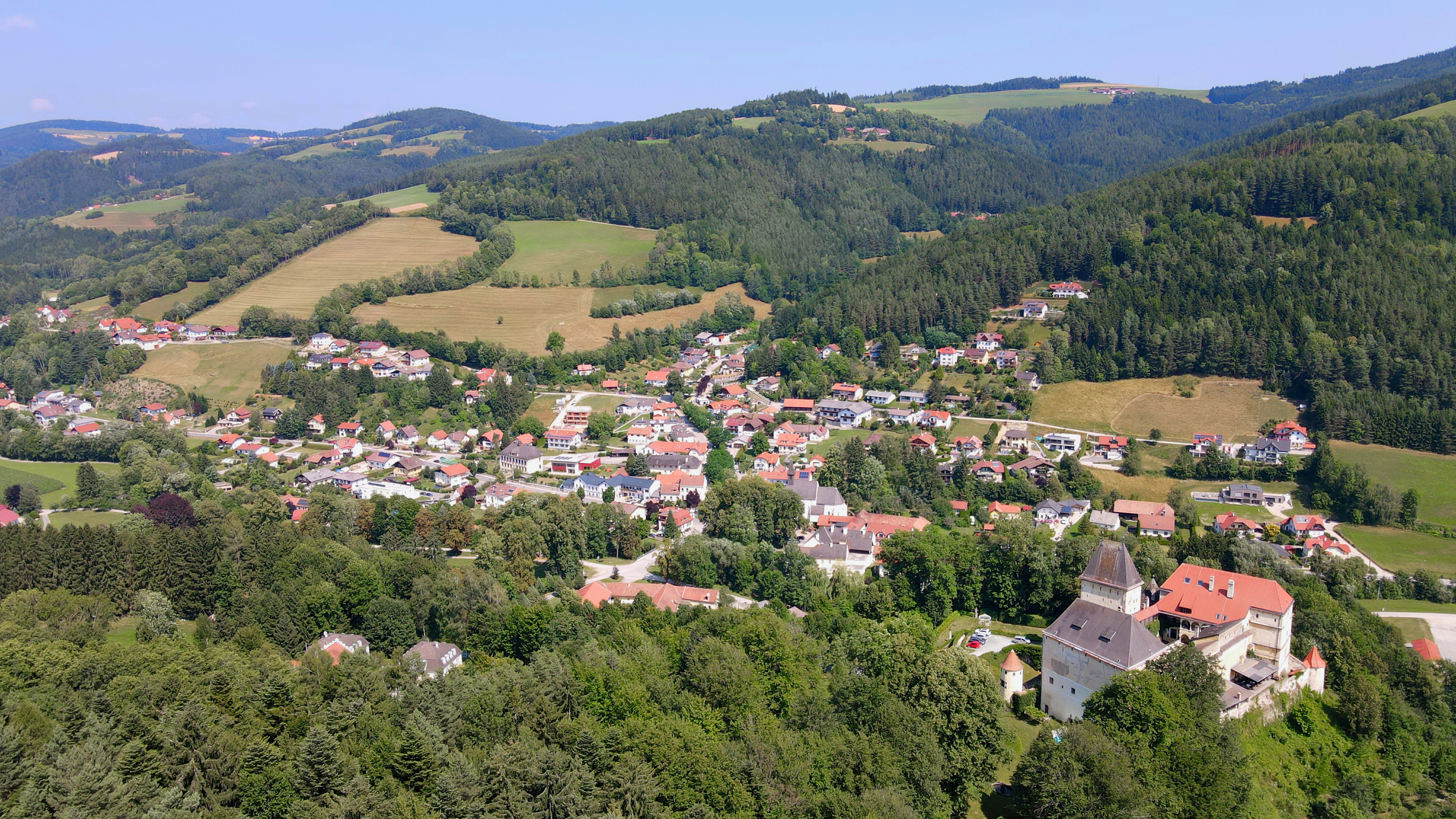
- Aerial view of Feistritz am Wechsel

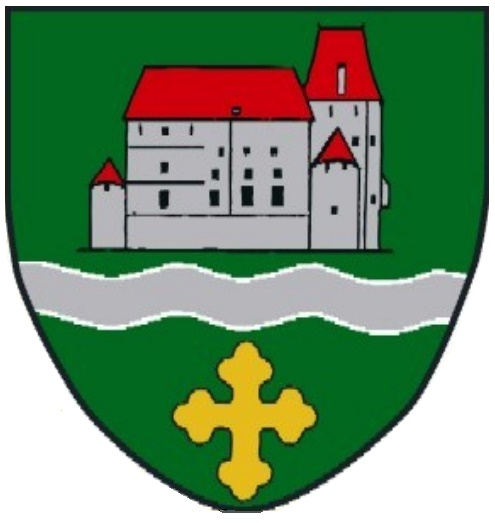
- Coat of arms

- Location within Austria
- Coordinates: 47°36′N 16°3′E
- Country: Austria
- State: Lower Austria
- District: Neunkirchen

Government
  - Mayor: Josef Aminger (ÖVP)

Area
  - Total: 23.78 km^{2} (9.18 sq mi)
- Elevation: 487 m (1,598 ft)

Population (2018-01-01)
  - Total: 1,038
  - Density: 43.65/km^{2} (113.1/sq mi)
- Time zone: UTC+1 (CET)
  - Summer (DST): UTC+2 (CEST)
- Postal code: 2873
- Area code: 02641
- Website: www.feistritz-wechsel.gv.at

Feistritz am Wechsel is a town in the district of Neunkirchen in the Austrian state of Lower Austria.

== Population ==
Historical population
Year	Pop.	±%
1869	1,051	—
1880	1,038	−1.2%
1890	974	−6.2%
1900	946	−2.9%
1910	985	+4.1%
1923	964	−2.1%
1934	1,055	+9.4%
1939	1,031	−2.3%
1951	1,030	−0.1%
1961	993	−3.6%
1971	1,093	+10.1%
1981	1,085	−0.7%
1991	1,163	+7.2%
2001	1,081	−7.1%
2011	1,075	−0.6%
