= Breitenau, Lower Austria =

Breitenau
- Municipality
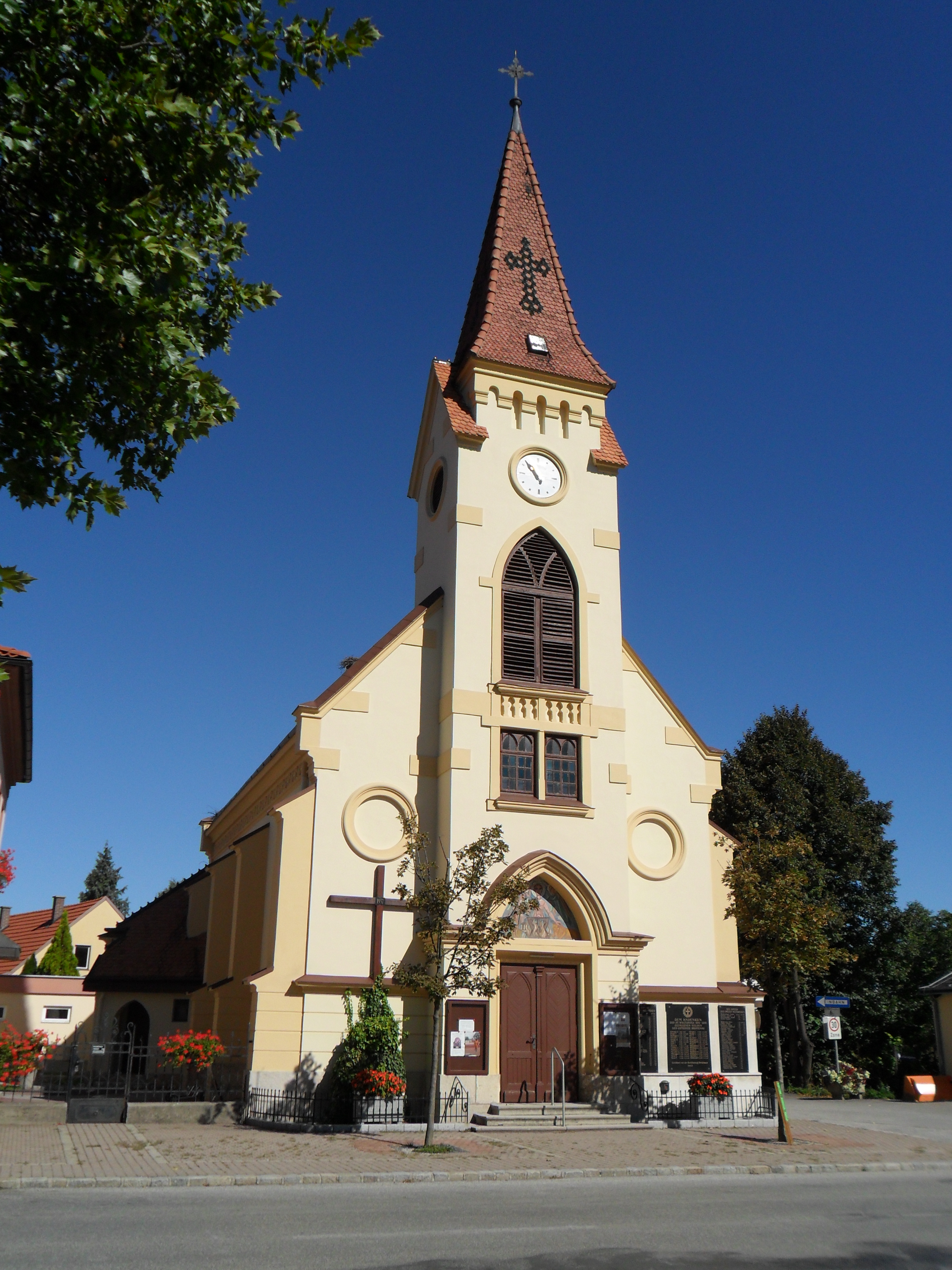
- Catholic church in Breitenau

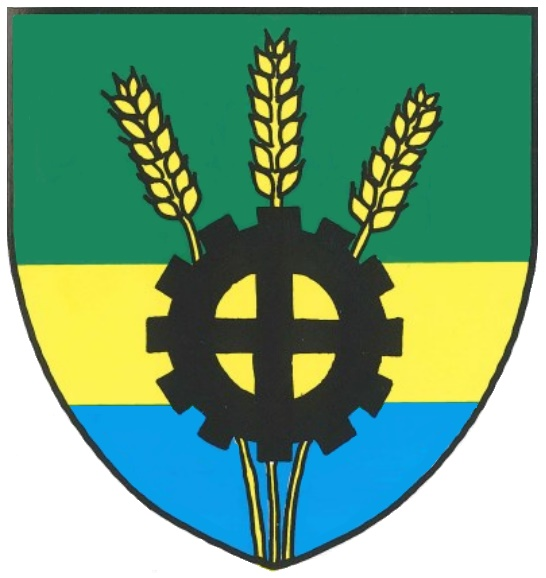
- Coat of arms

- Location within Austria
- Coordinates: 47°44′N 16°9′E
- Country: Austria
- State: Lower Austria
- District: Neunkirchen

Government
  - Mayor: Robert Kwas (SPÖ)

Area
  - Total: 9.63 km^{2} (3.72 sq mi)
- Elevation: 343 m (1,125 ft)

Population (2018-01-01)
  - Total: 1,576
  - Density: 164/km^{2} (424/sq mi)
- Time zone: UTC+1 (CET)
  - Summer (DST): UTC+2 (CEST)
- Postal code: 2624
- Area code: 02635

Breitenau is a town in the district of Neunkirchen in the Austrian state of Lower Austria.

== Population ==
Historical population
Year	Pop.	±%
1869	448	—
1880	501	+11.8%
1890	639	+27.5%
1900	746	+16.7%
1910	895	+20.0%
1923	893	−0.2%
1934	1,043	+16.8%
1939	999	−4.2%
1951	966	−3.3%
1961	966	+0.0%
1971	1,047	+8.4%
1981	1,050	+0.3%
1991	1,061	+1.0%
2001	1,246	+17.4%
2011	1,394	+11.9%
