= Empress Elisabeth Memorial Church =

Church in Lower Austria

Coordinates: 47°45′32″N 15°50′07″E

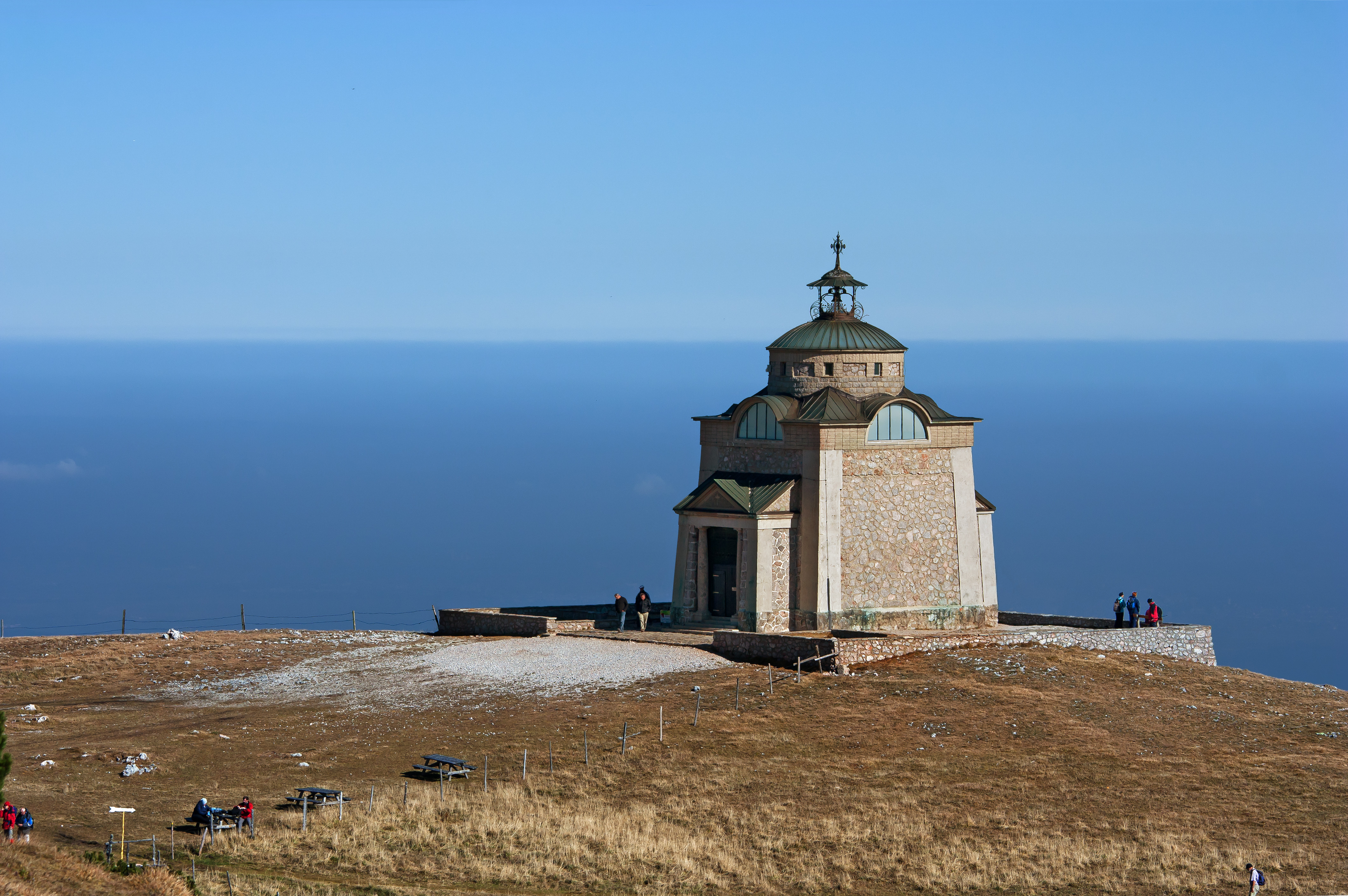
Empress Elisabeth Memorial Church

Empress Elisabeth Memorial Church (German: Kaiserin-Elisabeth-Gedächtniskirche) is a small Roman Catholic church on the Schneeberg in Lower Austria. It is close to the mountain station of the Schneebergbahn. The memorial church belongs to the parish of Puchberg am Schneeberg and is the highest church of the Archdiocese of Vienna at an altitude of 1,796 metres (5,892 ft) above sea level.

The church was commissioned by Emperor Franz Joseph I of Austria in the memory of Empress Elisabeth of Austria in 1901. The plans were by the architect Rudolf Goebel, and it was designed in the Jugendstil. The consecration was on 5 September 1901 by the Viennese auxiliary bishop Godfried Marschall.

== See also ==
- Emperor Maximilian Memorial Chapel
- Votivkirche, Vienna
