= Emperor Maximilian Memorial Chapel =

Chapel in Querétaro, Mexico

Coordinates: 20°35′35″N 100°24′34″W

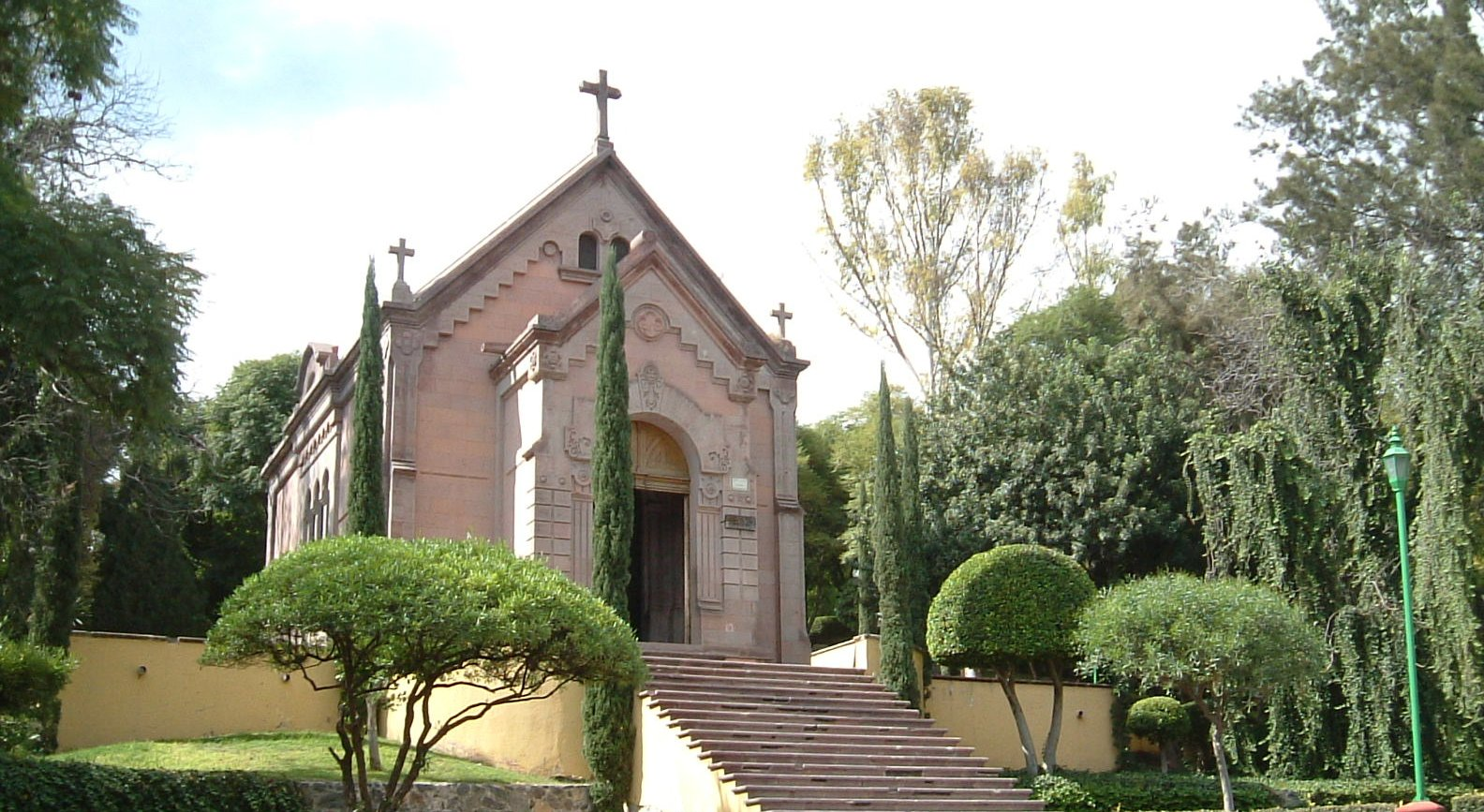
Emperor Maximilian Memorial Chapel on the Hill of the Bells in Querétaro

The Emperor Maximilian Memorial Chapel is a small Roman Catholic chapel located on the Cerro de las Campanas (Hill of the Bells) in Querétaro City in central Mexico. It is dedicated to the memory of Emperor Maximilian I of Mexico, and was built on the spot where the Emperor and two of his generals were executed on 19 June 1867.

== History ==
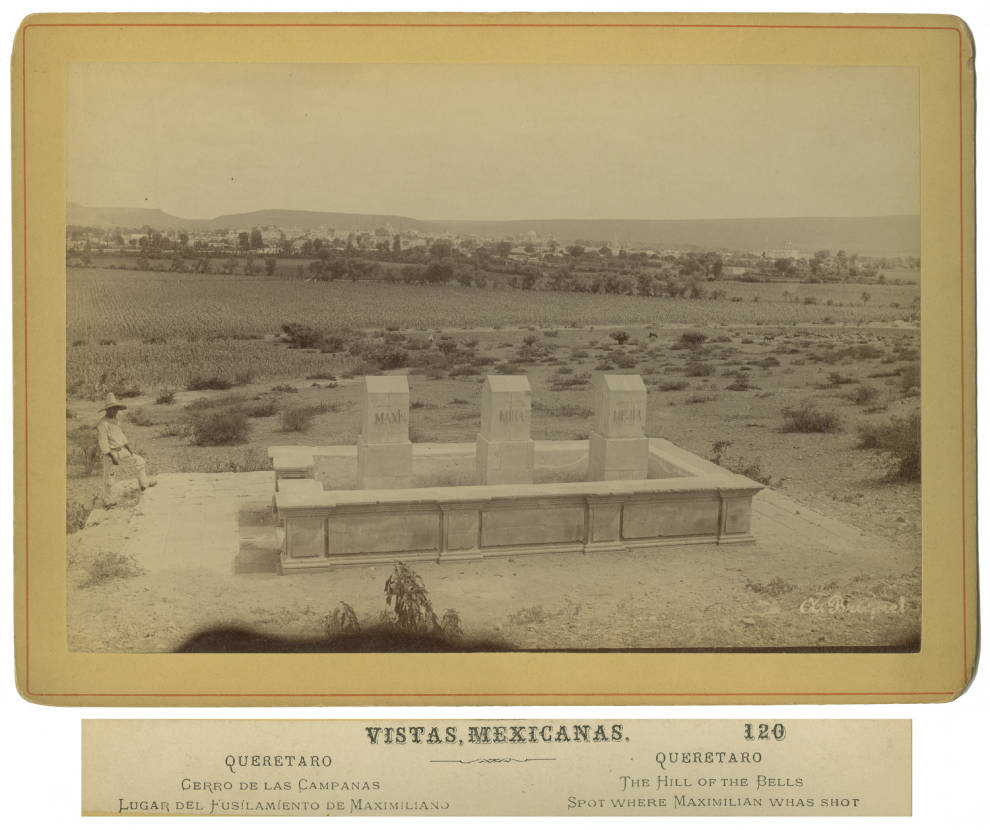
The initial monument with three columns mark the spot where Maximilian and two of his generals were executed. Later the chapel was built on the spot.

The hill on what was formerly the outskirts of Querétaro was the site of the end of the Second Mexican Empire. After being intercepted by the republican generals on 15 May 1867, the Austrian-born Emperor, who had been besieged in the central city of Querétaro since March, surrendered on the mountain to Republican Army General Mariano Escobedo. He was jailed on the mountain along with his two generals: Miguel Miramón, who had been the president of Mexico for most of 1859 and 1860, and Tomás Mejía Camacho, a Querétaro-born cavalry general. After a court-martial in Querétaro in which all three were sentenced to death, the sentence was carried out atop the hill on 19 June 1867, when Maximilian, Miramón, and Mejía were executed.

Initially, the site was only marked with makeshift piles of stone topped by crosses made of sticks. Later, wooden crosses were placed on the site, which are now housed in the Cerro de las Campanas Museum. In 1886 during the regime of President Porfirio Díaz, a liberal general who had fought against the French invasion, the first monument was constructed on the site. It consisted of three stone columns engraved with the names of the deceased emperor and his two generals, surrounded by iron bars supported by wooden columns, commissioned by Governor Rafael Olvera.

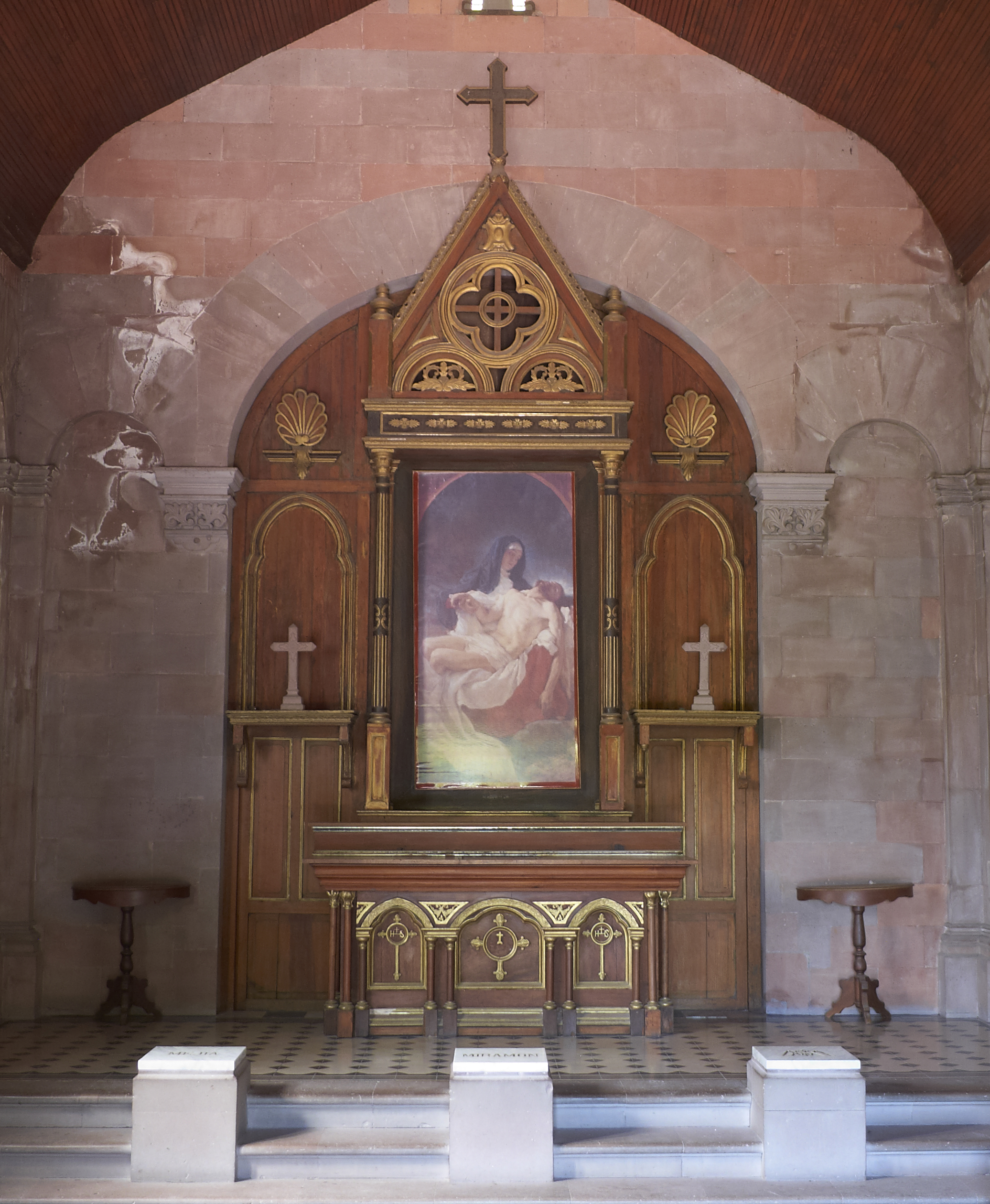
The altar of the chapel

In 1900, after diplomatic relations between Díaz's Mexico and Austria-Hungary resumed, the chapel was constructed on the site. Commissioned by Emperor Franz Joseph I in memory of his late brother and designed by architect Maximiliano Mitzel, the chapel was dedicated on 10 April 1901. It is designed in an eclectic Viennese style. The altar and altarpiece were made at the Querétaro School of Arts and Crafts, and the cross on the altar is taken from the Austrian frigate SMS Novara, which had brought Maximilian and his wife Empress Carlota to Mexico, and which later transported Maximilian's remains back to Austria. Maximilian is buried in the Imperial Crypt in Vienna.

In January 2017, the Querétaro municipal government announced it would invest nearly 1 million pesos for the restoration and maintenance of the chapel.

== See also ==
- Votivkirche, Vienna
- Empress Elisabeth Memorial Church
