= Puchberg am Schneeberg =

- Municipality
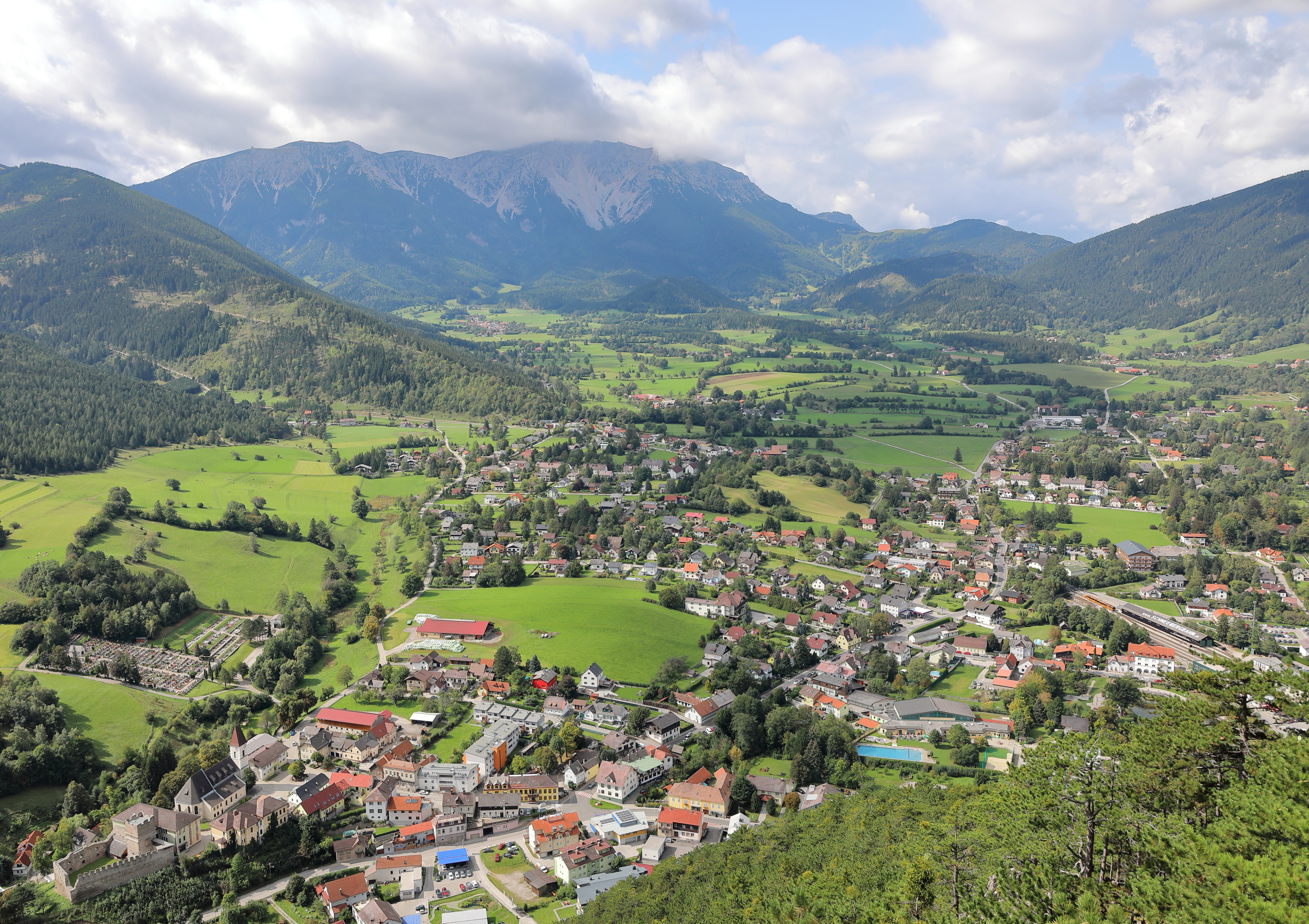

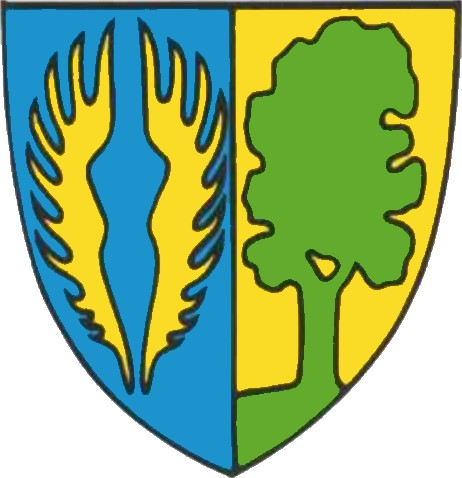
- Coat of arms

- Location within Austria
- Coordinates: 47°47′00″N 15°54′00″E
- Country: Austria
- State: Lower Austria
- District: Neunkirchen

Government
  - Mayor: Michael Knabl (SPÖ)

Area
  - Total: 83.17 km^{2} (32.11 sq mi)
- Elevation: 585 m (1,919 ft)

Population (2018-01-01)
  - Total: 2,683
  - Density: 32.26/km^{2} (83.55/sq mi)
- Time zone: UTC+1 (CET)
  - Summer (DST): UTC+2 (CEST)
- Postal code: 2733, 2734, 2761
- Area code: 02636
- Vehicle registration: NK
- Website: www.puchberg.at

Puchberg am Schneeberg is a town in the south-eastern part of Lower Austria with approximately 2650 inhabitants. It is situated about 80 kilometres from Vienna. The highest point of Puchberg is the Schneeberg with 2076 m, the highest mountain of Lower Austria.

Already in the 18th and 19th centuries, Puchberg was a popular destination for visitors. With the opening of the Schneeberg Railway, tourism became more important than farming, which traditionally had been the primary source of revenue. The spa is one of the most famous tourist destinations in Lower Austria.

== History ==
About its early history, little is known. A Roman road, on which grains, wine and salt were transported, passed through the area. The name Puchberg was first mentioned in 1260 in reference to Eberhard von Puchperch. In the Middle Ages four castles were built near Puchberg, including Puchberg Castle, of which only ruins remain.

The village was destroyed in 1683 by Ottoman forces at the time of the Battle of Vienna. With the opening of the railway from Wiener Neustadt and the rack railway to the Schneeberg in 1897, tourism became important. The region became a resort area for the Viennese upper classes seeking to escape the city in summer, and it still serves as a nature retreat today.

== Subdivisions ==
- Puchberg am Schneeberg
- Rohrbachgraben
- Stolzenwörth

== Sites of interest ==
- Puchberg Castle – the castle which was built around 1204. Its age was determined on the basis dendrochronological investigations at wooden remainders.
- School – where the philosopher Ludwig Wittgenstein was an elementary school teacher
- Schneeberg, the highest mountain in Niederosterreich, accessible with the Schneeberg rack railway. Schneeberg is also the site of the Empress Elisabeth Memorial Church, built in the memory of the Empress Elisabeth.
- The lake – The heart of Puchberg's downtown is occupied by a lake surrounded by a path and landscaped flowers and plants. There is also an outdoor stage.
- Two spas

== Image gallery ==
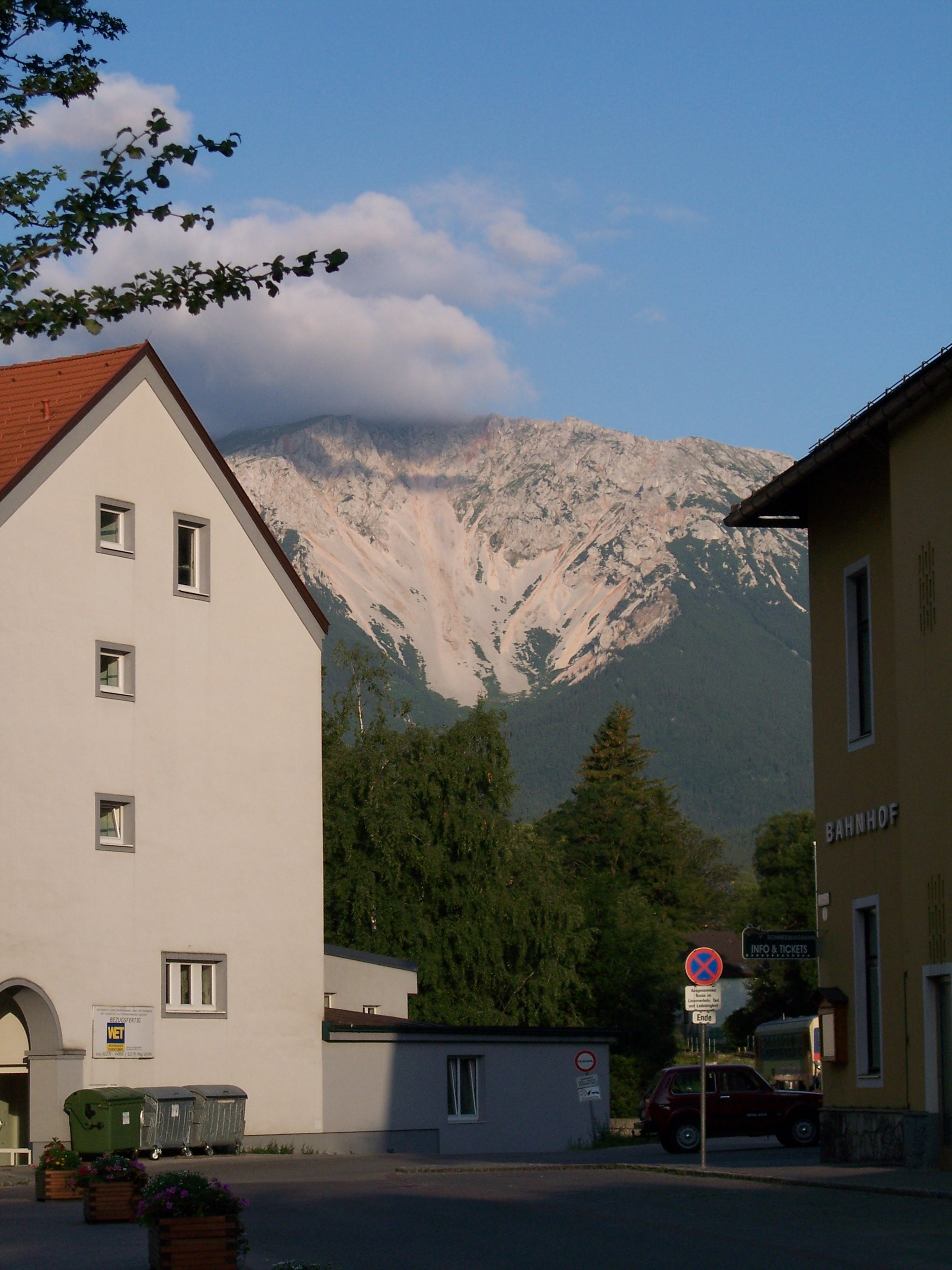
View to mountain Schneeberg

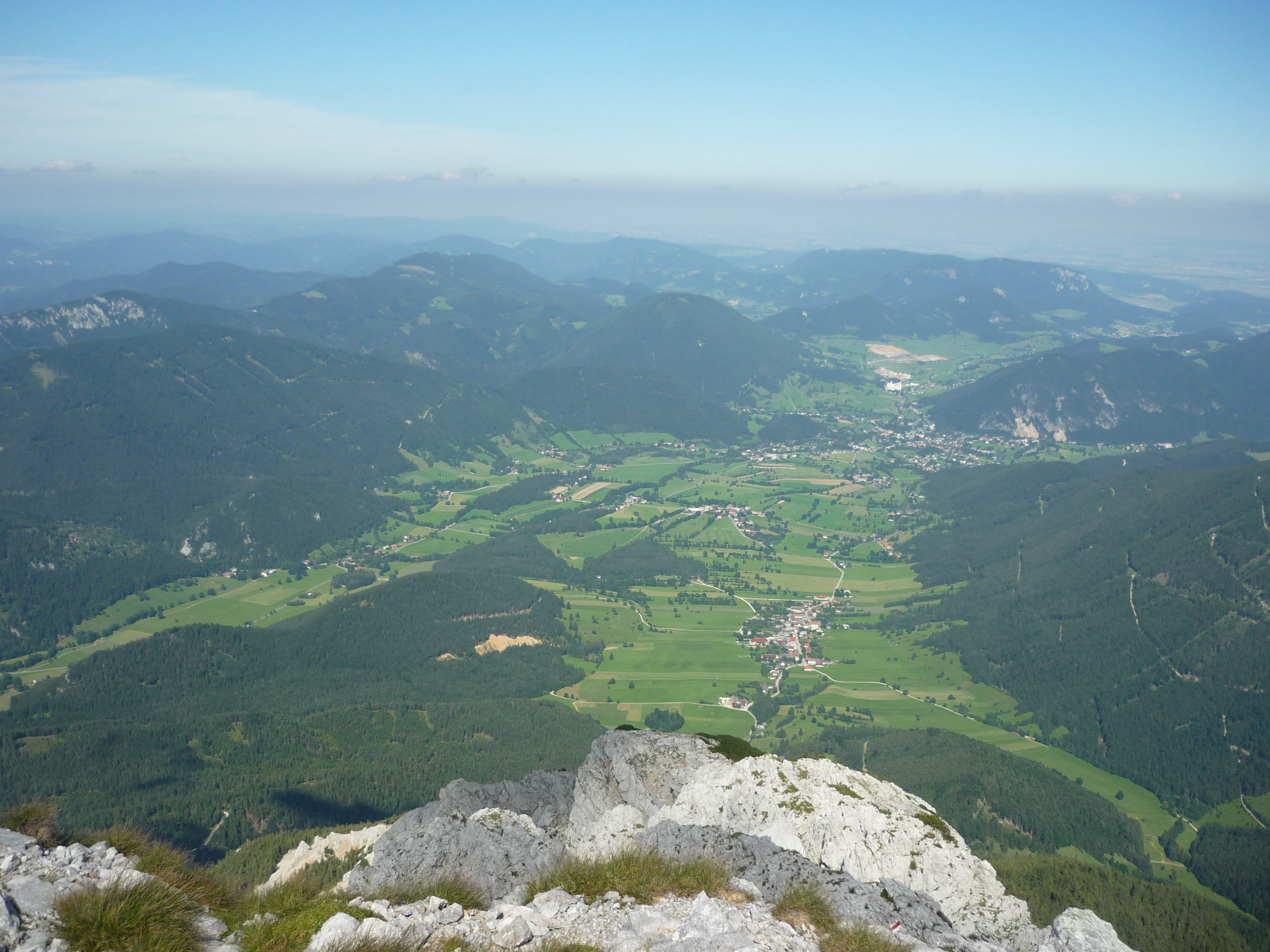
Puchberg, seen from the Schneeberg

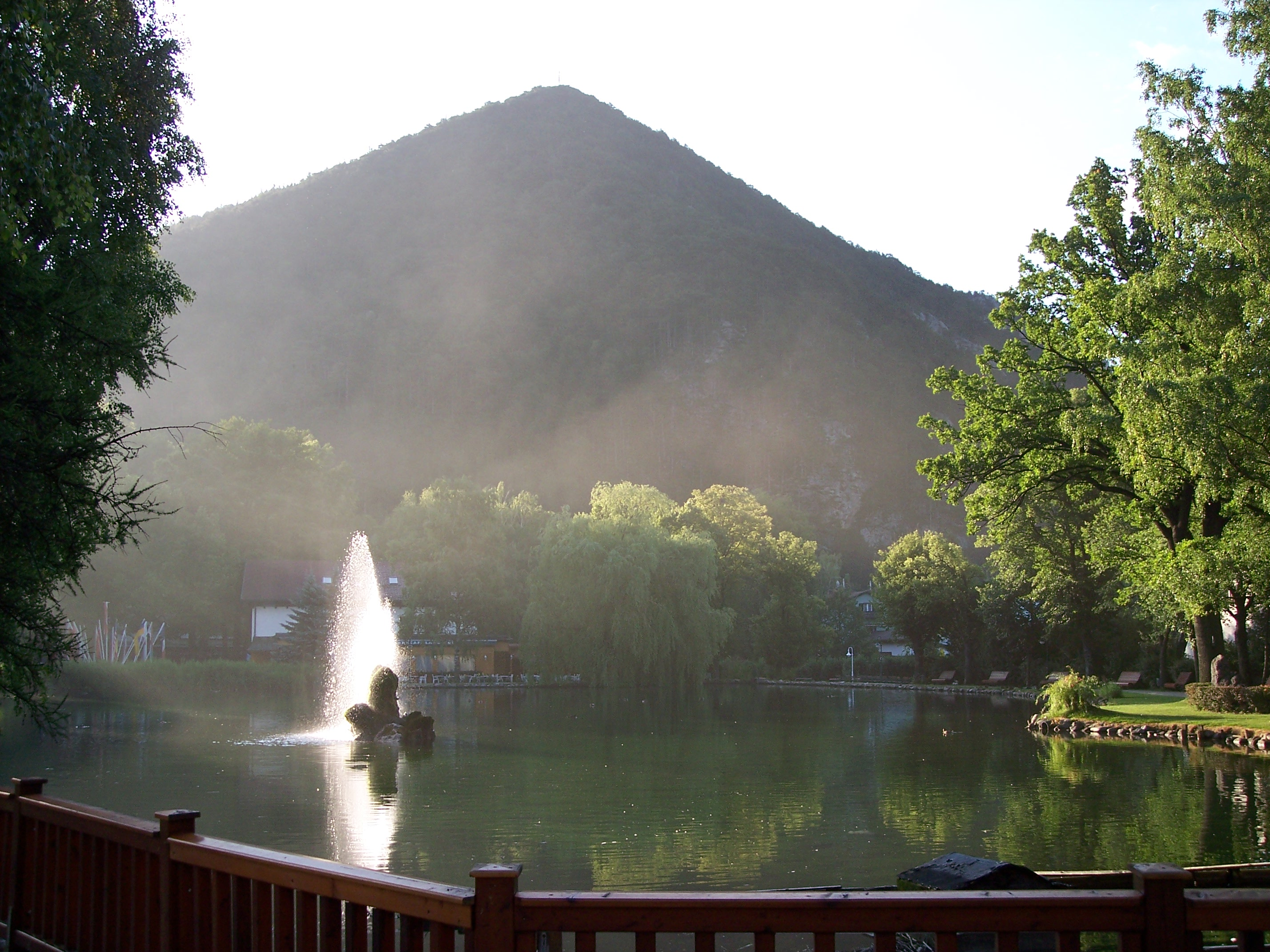
Lake of Puchberg am Schneeberg

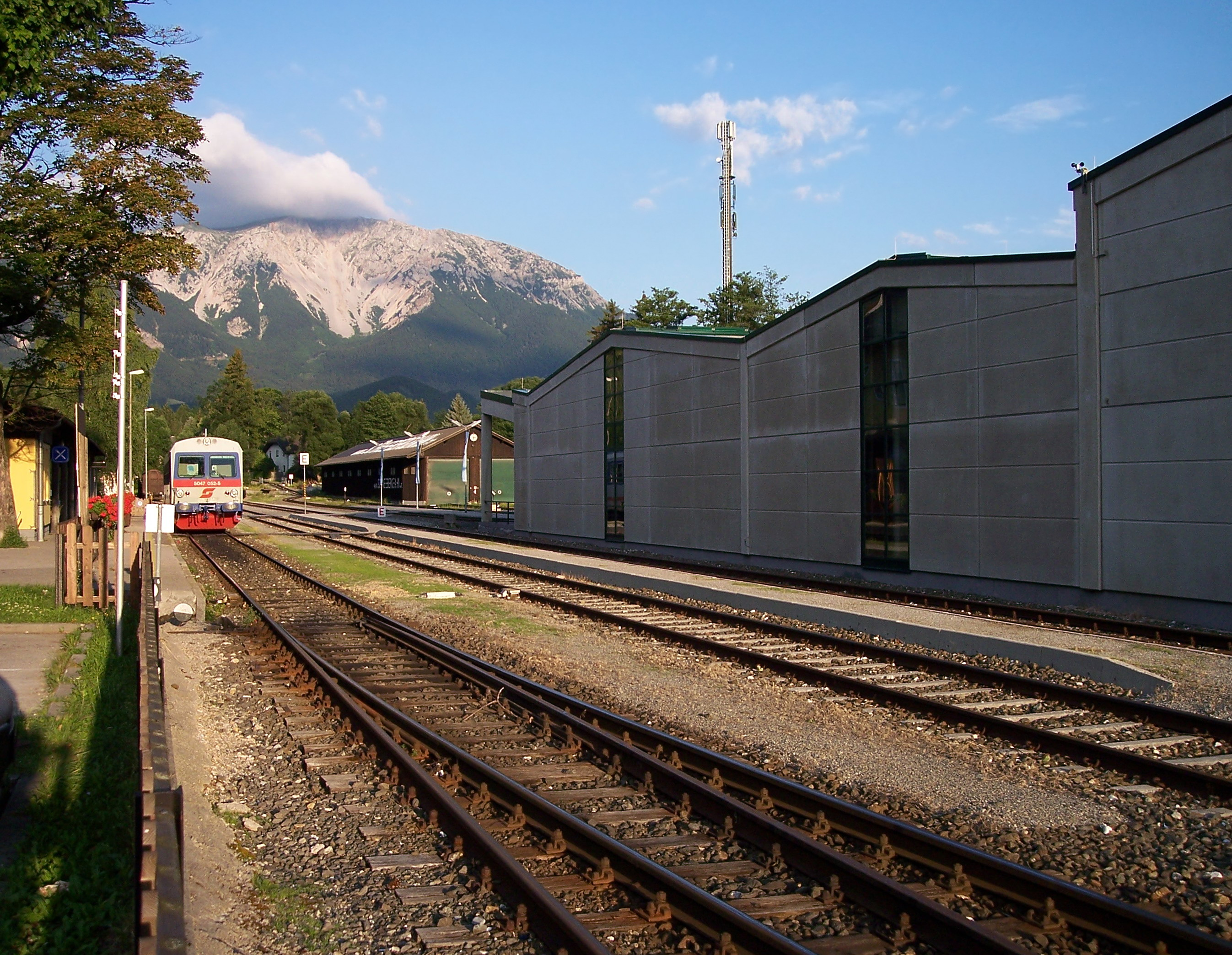
Railway station of Puchberg am Schneeberg

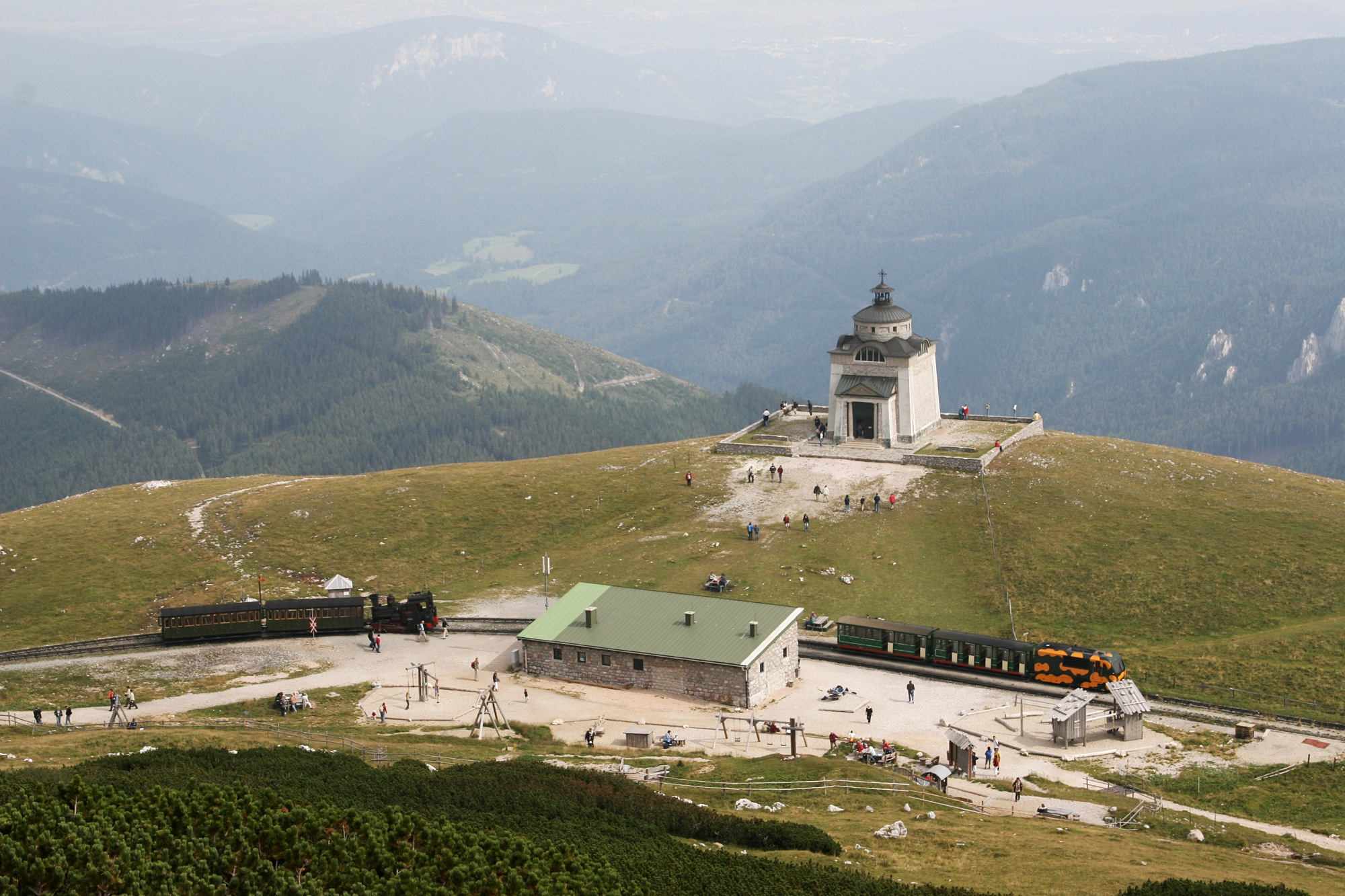
Elisabeth church and Schneeberg Railway station on Schneeberg
