= János Libényi =

Hungarian assassin

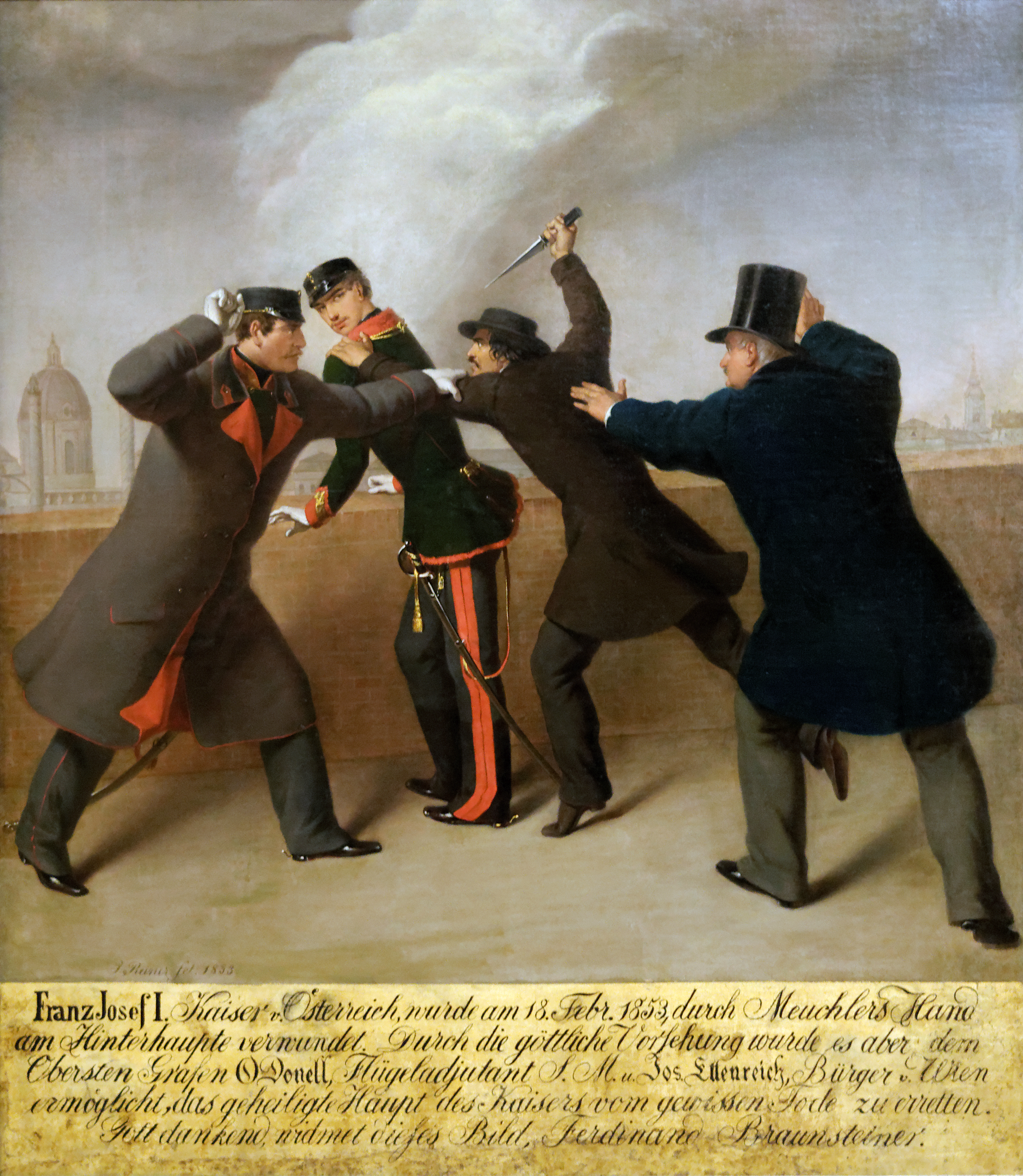
- Born: 8 December 1831; Csákvár, Kingdom of Hungary
- Died: 26 February 1853 (aged 21); Vienna, Austria
- Cause of death: Execution by hanging
- Resting place: Vienna
- Occupation: Tailor

János Libényi (in archaic English sources: John Libényi, Csákvár, 8 December 1831 – Vienna, 26 February 1853) was a Hungarian tailor-servant who attempted to assassinate Austrian Emperor Franz Joseph. This was the first of seven assassination attempts against the Emperor.

== Life ==
He was born in 1831 to János Libényi Sr., tailor and chief-conductor of the local guild of tailors, and Erzsébet (Elisabeth) Lukács. Following the suppression of the Hungarian War of Independence, he continued his studies within the guild system and, as a journeyman tailor bearing a journeyman’s book, travelled to Buda in 1850 and also spent time in Vác, and a year later he moved to Vienna, where he worked in Samuel Mayer's tailoring workshop, however he failed to pass the master's exam.

== Assassination attempt ==
=== Background ===
With the help of the Russian intervention, the Hungarian Revolution of 1848 was crushed by the Austrian army in 1849. While in Arad, he witnessed the execution of the 13 Martyrs of Arad, a tragic event that deeply angered and saddened him, thus he became involved in underground revolutionary movements. According to local folklore, the young Franz Joseph had seduced his younger sister Margit (Margaret) after becoming entranced by her dancing at the Prater and had her educated at a girls' school. For Libényi, this 'humiliating and shameful event' was the last straw, and he decided to assassinate the emperor no matter what it took. However, investigation records make this claim unlikely, as they reveal that of Libényi's three sisters, one was married at the time, and two were under the age of fifteen, casting doubt on the plausibility of Franz Joseph's romantic involvement with any of them. In 1851 Libény moved to Vienna with the clear intent of assassinating Franz Joseph.

=== Assassination attempt ===
Libényi did not leave anything to chance.

He converted a pig-sticking knife into a dagger with the help of an acquaintance who worked as a Schleifer (grinder).

He carefully observed the Emperor’s daily routine: around noon, the monarch would take a walk every day with almost clockwork precision along the walkway atop the city walls, which at the time still encircled the inner city. After observing the course of this walk on twelve separate occasions, he deemed the moment had come.

Libényi carried out the assassination attempt on 18 February 1853, when the Emperor was on the Kärtnertor Bastion walk, the Emperor's usual walking route, and leaned out over the parapet of the bastion to observe the soldiers exercising below. Then suddenly Libényi rushed forward and stabbed him in the back of the neck with a kitchen knife, which he had previously ground into a dagger.

His attempt was thwarted by the intervention of Major Maximilian Karl Lamoral O'Donnell, an aide-de-camp, and the Viennese butcher Joseph Ettenreich, who was later knighted for his part in subduing the attacker, thus the Emperor escaped with a non-fatal wound. The life of the monarch, however, was not only saved due to the quick intervention, as Libényi's knife with the wrong side of the blade hit the hard collar of his military jacket and slipped. This contributed greatly to the monarch's survival. Franz Joseph was confined to bed, and for a time his doctors feared that the Emperor might lose his sight and go blind.

Libényi was arrested, and during his interrogation he said that in 1849 he worked in the military tailor's workshop of the Fortress of Arad and witnessed the execution of the Martyrs of Arad. He decided then to take revenge on the Emperor who could have prevented the executions, but did nothing.

=== Trial and execution ===
On 24 February, Libényi was tried by court martial and sentenced to death by hanging, which was carried out on 26 February in front of an audience of thousands, despite the blizzard that was raging at the time.

The Viennese court responded to the various revolutionary movements with a wave of repression: arrests and executions and increased patrols and searches. According to local folklore the assassin from Csákvár was the reason why the railway never reached Csákvár.

The old city wall where the assassination took place was razed to the ground by Franz Joseph that same year, and the Ring, Vienna's Grand Boulevard, was built on its site.

"The treatment to which my country has been subjected under the present Emperor’s rule has shaken me to the very depths of my being. I love my country above all things, even more dearly than my own life; yet I have been forced to behold my fellow countrymen, men of the highest and noblest station, put to death—hanged, shot, and condemned by the score to imprisonment within fortress walls—and to witness every vestige of civil liberty and political rights vanish from the land.

I was incapable of enduring such a state of affairs. And since I had come to see that, under the present rigorous military, gendarmerie, and police surveillance, there could be no hope of any favourable change in the condition of my country, I resolved as early as 1850 to deliver my homeland from its present bondage by other means."

— János Libényi, final statement before the military court

=== Commemoration ===
Near the site where the assassination attempt was carried out, the Votivkirche (Votive Church) of Vienna was built, and an oil painting depicting the assassination attempt is held by the Vienna Museum.
