= Cerro de las Campanas =

Hill and national park in Querétaro, Mexico

Coordinates: 20°35′36″N 100°24′37.3″W

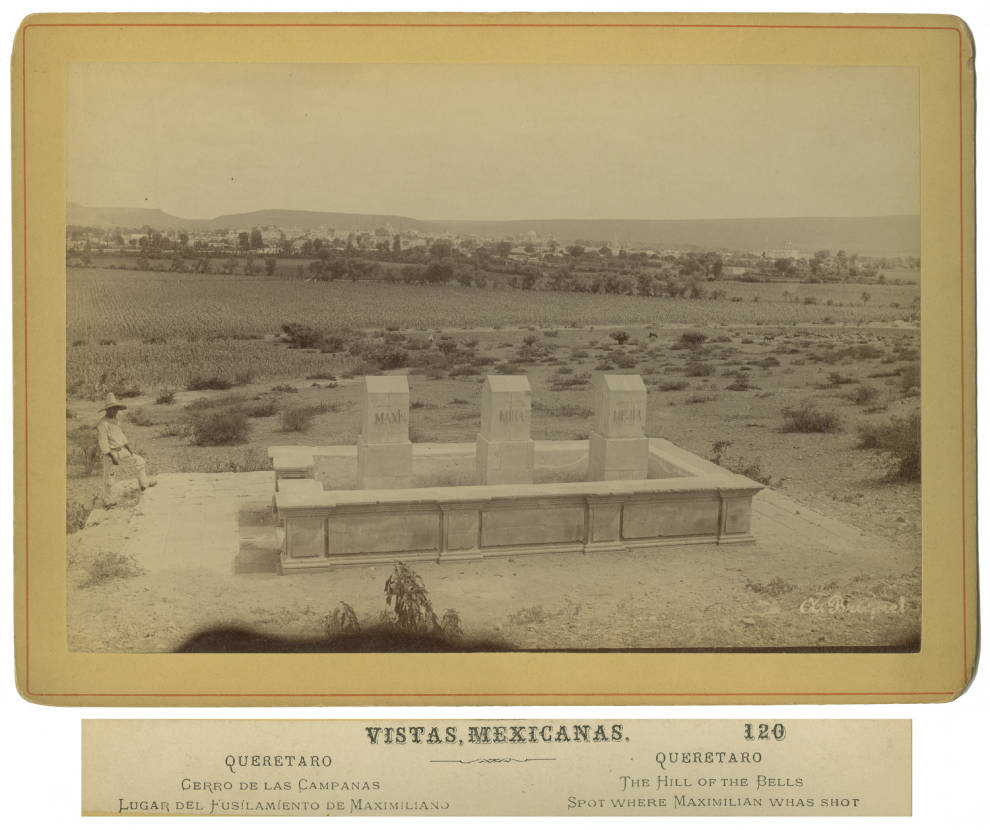
The Hill of Bells in its original state c. 1885–1899, with the first monument to the execution of Emperor Maximilian and his generals

The Cerro de las Campanas ("Hill of the Bells") is a hill and national park located in Querétaro City, Mexico. It is most noteworthy as the place where Emperor Maximilian I and Generals Miguel Miramón and Tomás Mejía were executed, definitively ending the Second Mexican Empire and French intervention in Mexico. The mountain gets its name from rocks that make bell sounds when struck.

== History ==
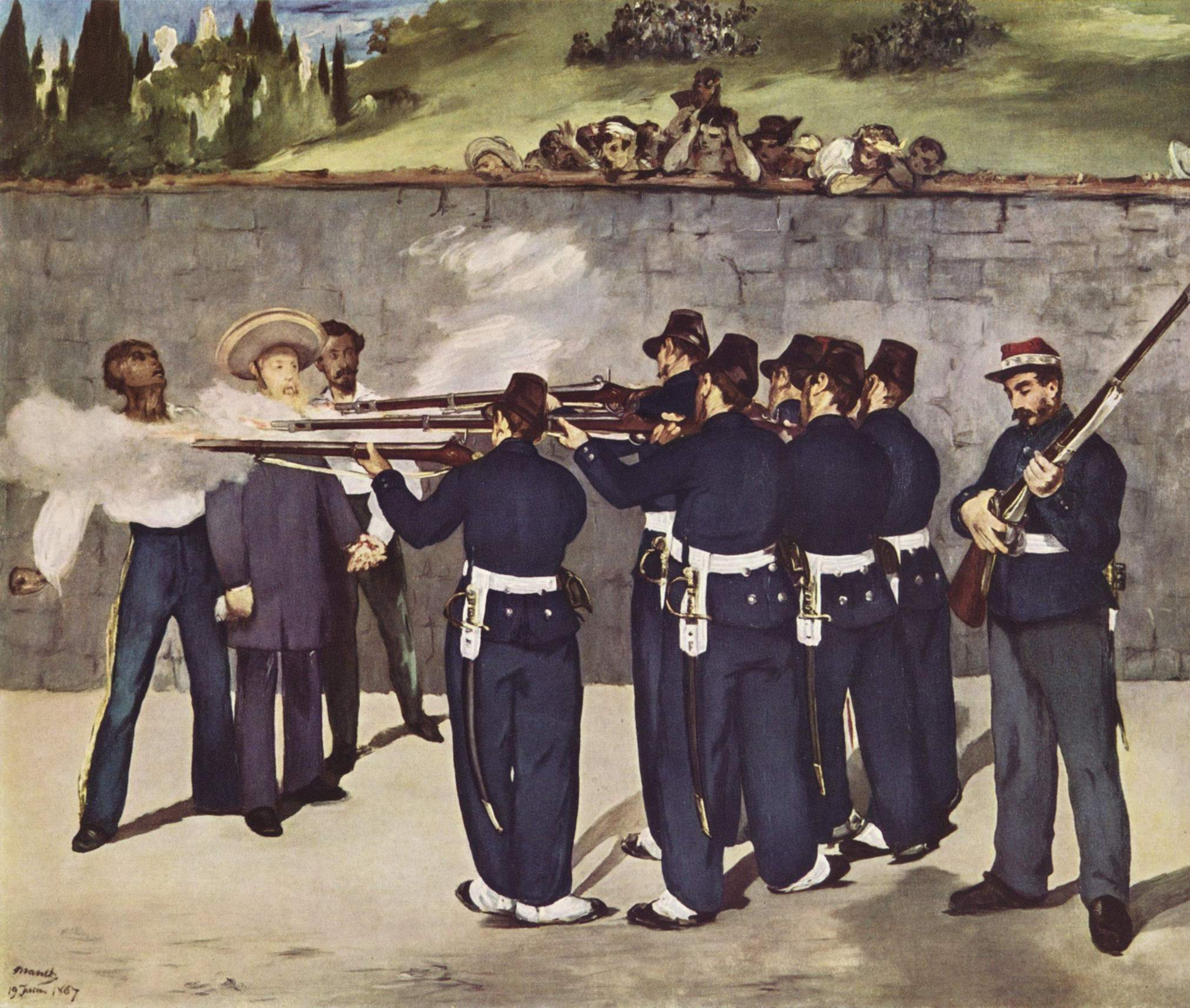
The Execution of Emperor Maximilian, Édouard Manet, 1869

The hill on what was formerly the outskirts of Querétaro was the site of the end of the Second Mexican Empire. After being intercepted by the republican generals on May 15, 1867, Maximilian, who had been besieged in the central city of Querétaro since March, surrendered on the mountain to General Mariano Escobedo. He was jailed on the mountain along with his two generals: Miramón, who had been the president of Mexico for most of 1859 and 1860, and Mejía, a Querétaro-born cavalry general. After a court-martial in Querétaro in which all three were sentenced to death, the sentence was carried out atop the hill on June 19, 1867, when Maximilian, Miramón and Mejía were executed.

The site was initially marked with piles of stone topped by crosses made of sticks; later, wooden crosses were placed on the site, which are now housed in the Cerro de las Campanas Museum. In 1886, the first monument was constructed on the site: three stone columns engraved with the names of the deceased, surrounded by iron bars supported by wooden columns, commissioned by Governor Rafael Olvera.

=== Emperor Maximilian Memorial Chapel ===
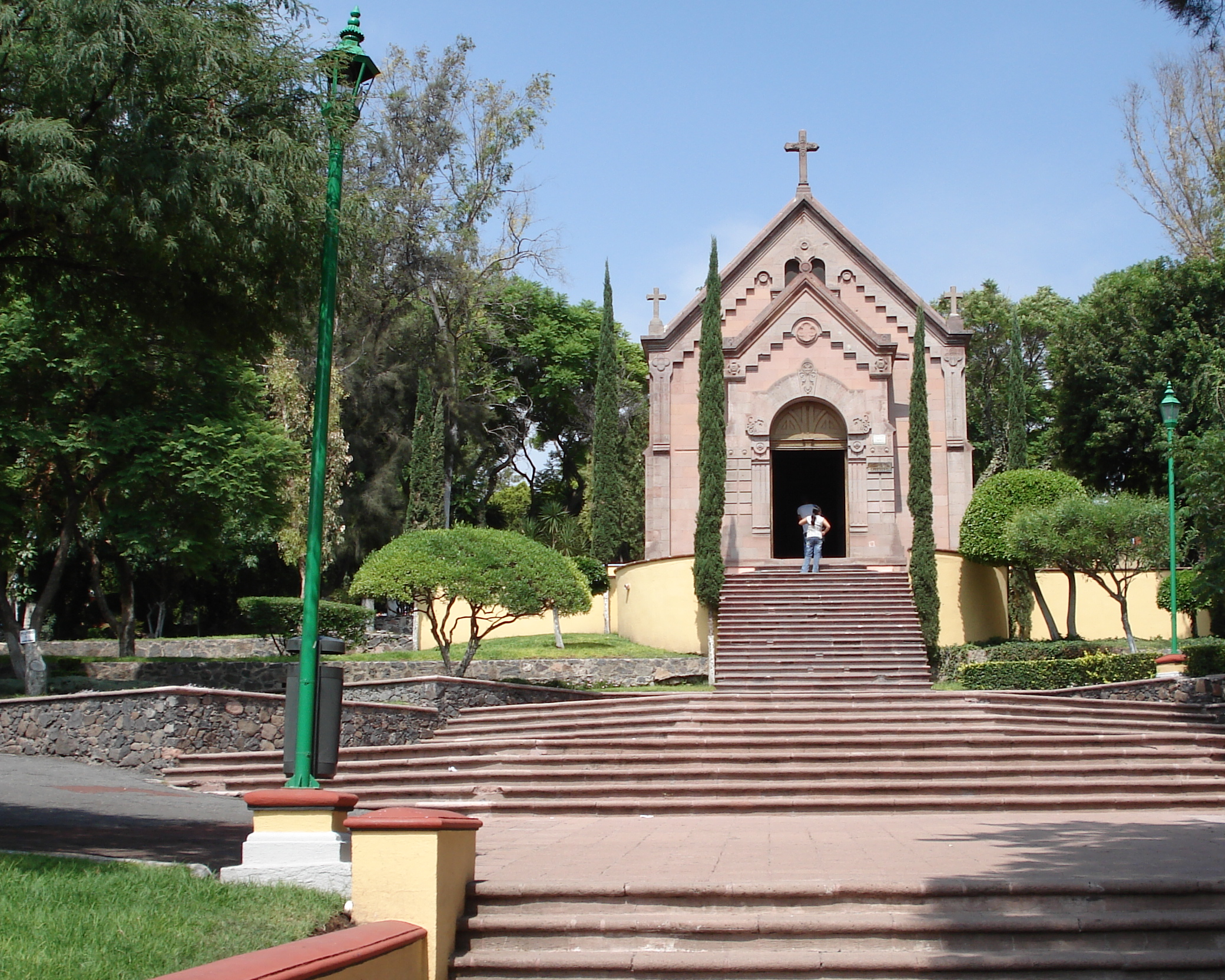
Emperor Maximilian Memorial Chapel

In 1900, after relations between Mexico and Austria resumed, the Emperor Maximilian Memorial Chapel was constructed on the site. Commissioned by Emperor Franz Joseph I in memory of his late brother the chapel was dedicated on April 10, 1901.

=== 20th-century uses and declaration of a national park ===
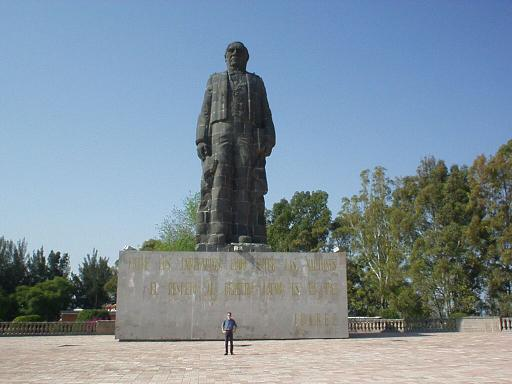
Statue of Benito Juárez on the mountain

In the 1950s, on the west slope of the hill, the Querétaro State Fairgrounds were constructed; the fair would later move to a new site in the early 1970s. On May 15, 1967, the centennial of the arrest of Maximilian, a portion of the mountain, including the east side and the summit, was designated a national park, the same day as the inauguration of a statue of Benito Juárez and a new esplanade by President Gustavo Díaz Ordaz and Governor Manuel González Cosío y Rivera; the statue was designed and sculpted by Juan F Olaguibel. The base of the statue features an engraving of a quote by Juárez, Entre los individuos como entre las naciones, el respeto al derecho ajeno es la paz, or "Among individuals as among nations, respect for the right of others is peace".

The southern and western slopes of the hill were transferred in the early 1970s from the fair to the Autonomous University of Queretaro, whose main university campus on the site was dedicated in December 1973.

=== Museum ===
The municipal government of Querétaro operates a museum on the mountain, constructed in 2003 and featuring five permanent exhibit rooms. The museum receives some 10,000 visitors each month.
