= Manuel González Cosío y Rivera =

Mexican politician (1915–2002)

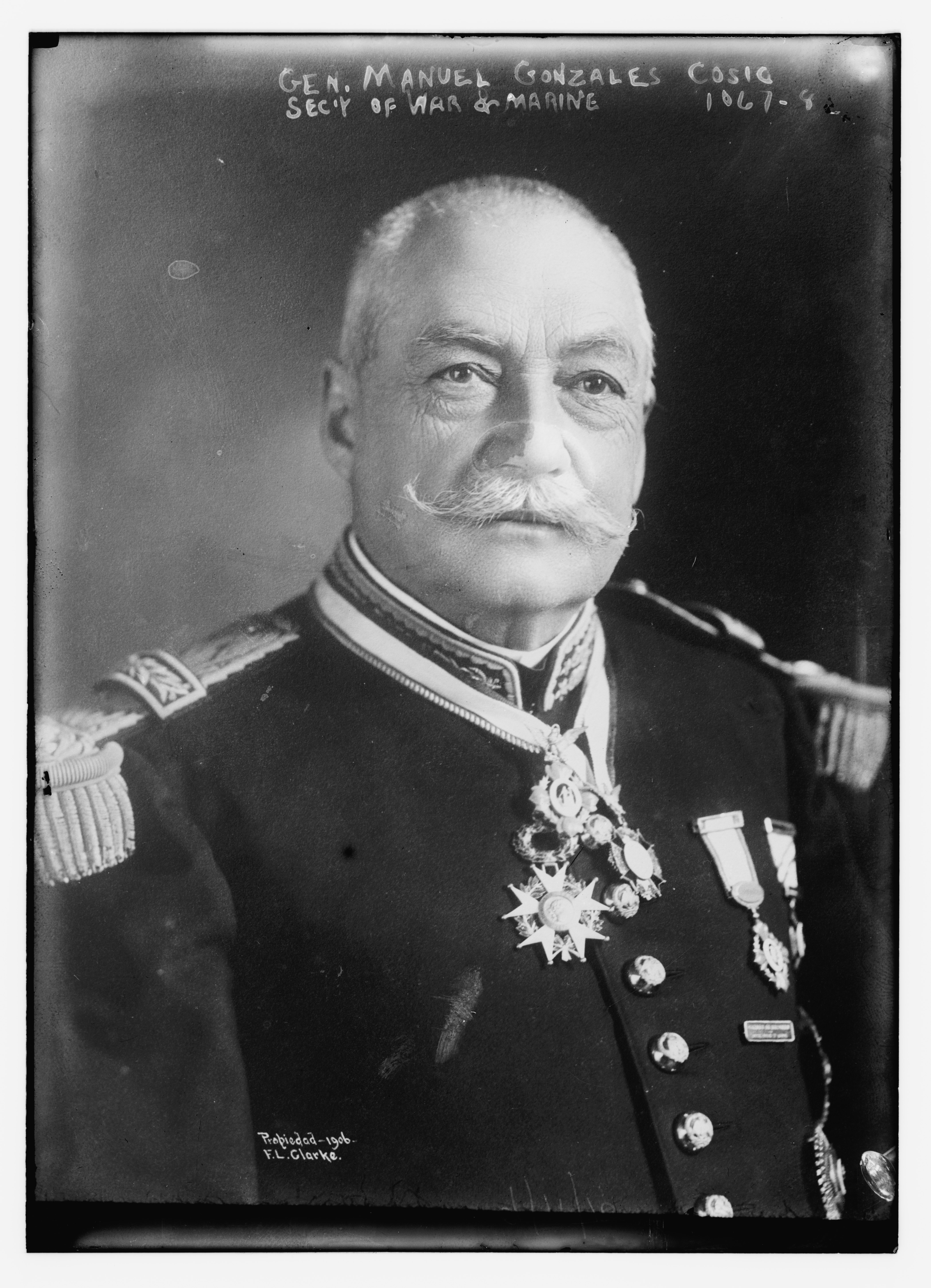

Manuel González Cosío y Rivera or Manuel González Cosío Díaz(Querétaro, Querétaro, April 14, 1915- February 5, 2002) was a Mexican politician, governor of Querétaro from 1961 to 1967.

== Biography ==
He was born in the city of Querétaro April 14, 1915. from a wealthy family and being the grandson of Francisco González de Cosio, who was also governor of the same state in the late nineteenth century under the presidency of Porfirio Díaz.

The son of Carlos Gonzalez de Cosio y Marroquin and Luz Maria Rivera y Oñate, I was born on 14th Street Arteaga, in this city of Querétaro, on April 14, 1915, when General Obregon defeated Villa in Celaya.

== Career ==
Manuel González studied chemistry at the UNAM and was president of the Federation of University Students of the Federal District in 1934. He held various positions in the Secretariat of Agriculture in the 1940s and 1950s, becoming Director of Desert Areas and secretary general of the secretariat's workers' union. He was elected federal deputy in 1949, senator in 1952 and governor in 1961.

In his six years he created the State Economic Council, and concessions and facilities were granted to several companies to build their plants in the state. The capital grew to a population of more than 100,000, requiring road improvements and additional public services. The Corregidora, Ezequiel Montes, Zaragoza and other avenues were widened and extended, and the Cimatario, del Valle, Las Rosas and Álamos areas were urbanized, and the General Hospital and Tecnologico de Querétaro were built, though they would not open until after he left office. In municipalities, the Rural Health Centers were built.

In the last year of his administration, there were two national holidays of events that took place in Querétaro: the fiftieth anniversary of the Constitution of 1917 and the centenary of the triumph of the republican forces that ended the French intervention in 1867. For such celebrations were created the Plaza of the Constitution (replacing the previous Escobedo Market) and the esplanade and monument to Benito Juárez atop the Cerro de las Campanas, both inaugurated by President Gustavo Díaz Ordaz on 5 February and 15 May 1967, respectively.

After being governor, Manuel Gonzalez worked for various private companies. In 1976 he was again elected senator, a position he held for a short time since he was appointed director of the National Company of Popular Subsistence (CONASUPO) by President José Lopez Portillo.
