= Schneeberg Railway (cog railway) =

Rack railway in Austria

Coordinates: 47°45′15″N 15°50′15″E

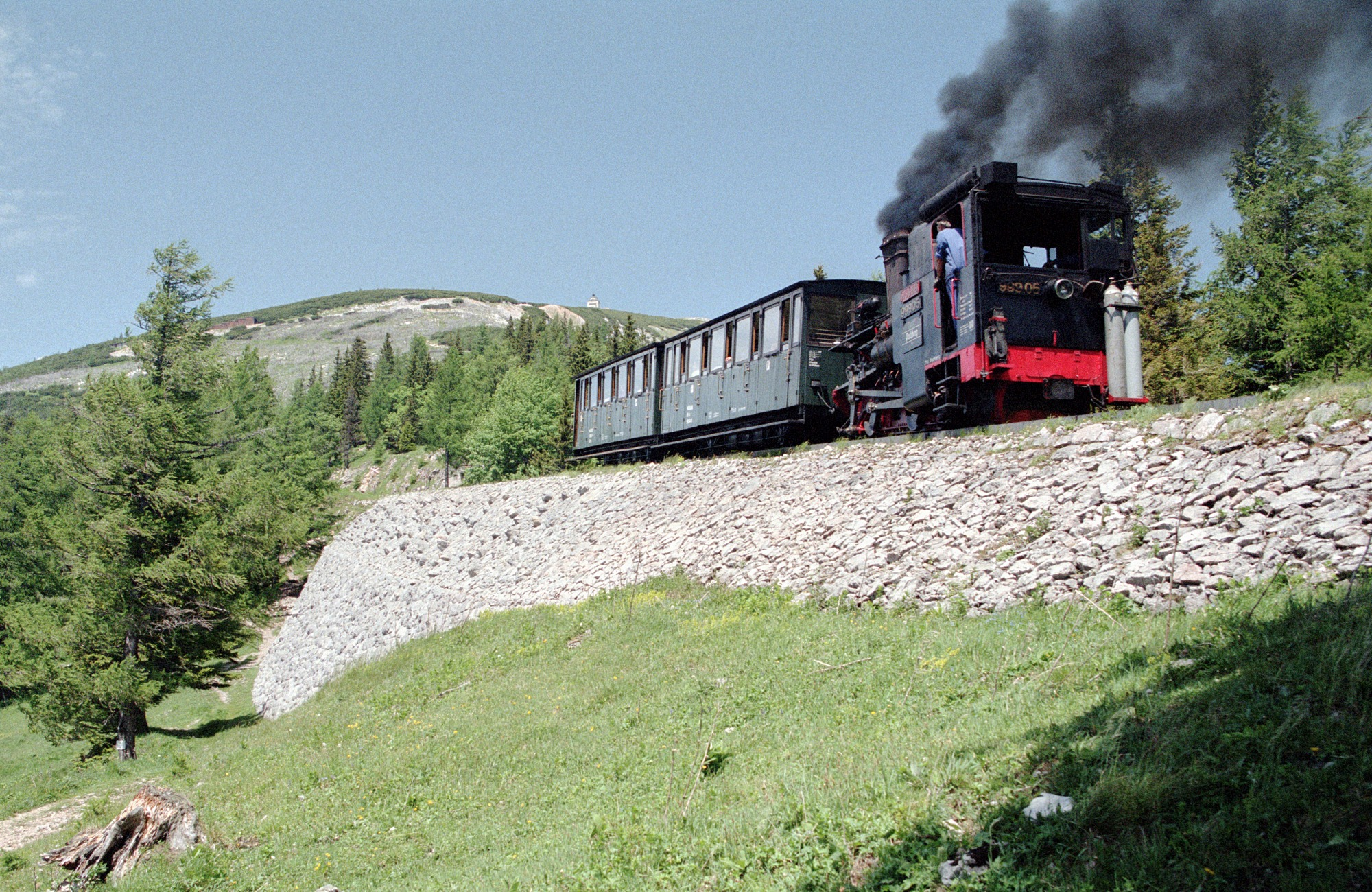
- Steam train and view to the summit

Overview
- Native name: Schneebergbahn
- Line number: 198.01

Technical
- Line length: 9.851 km (6.121 mi)
- Rack system: Abt
- Track gauge: 1,000 mm (3 ft 3 3/8 in)
- Minimum radius: 80 m (260 ft; 4.0 chains)
- Operating speed: 15 km/h (9 mph) max.
- Maximum incline: 19.6%

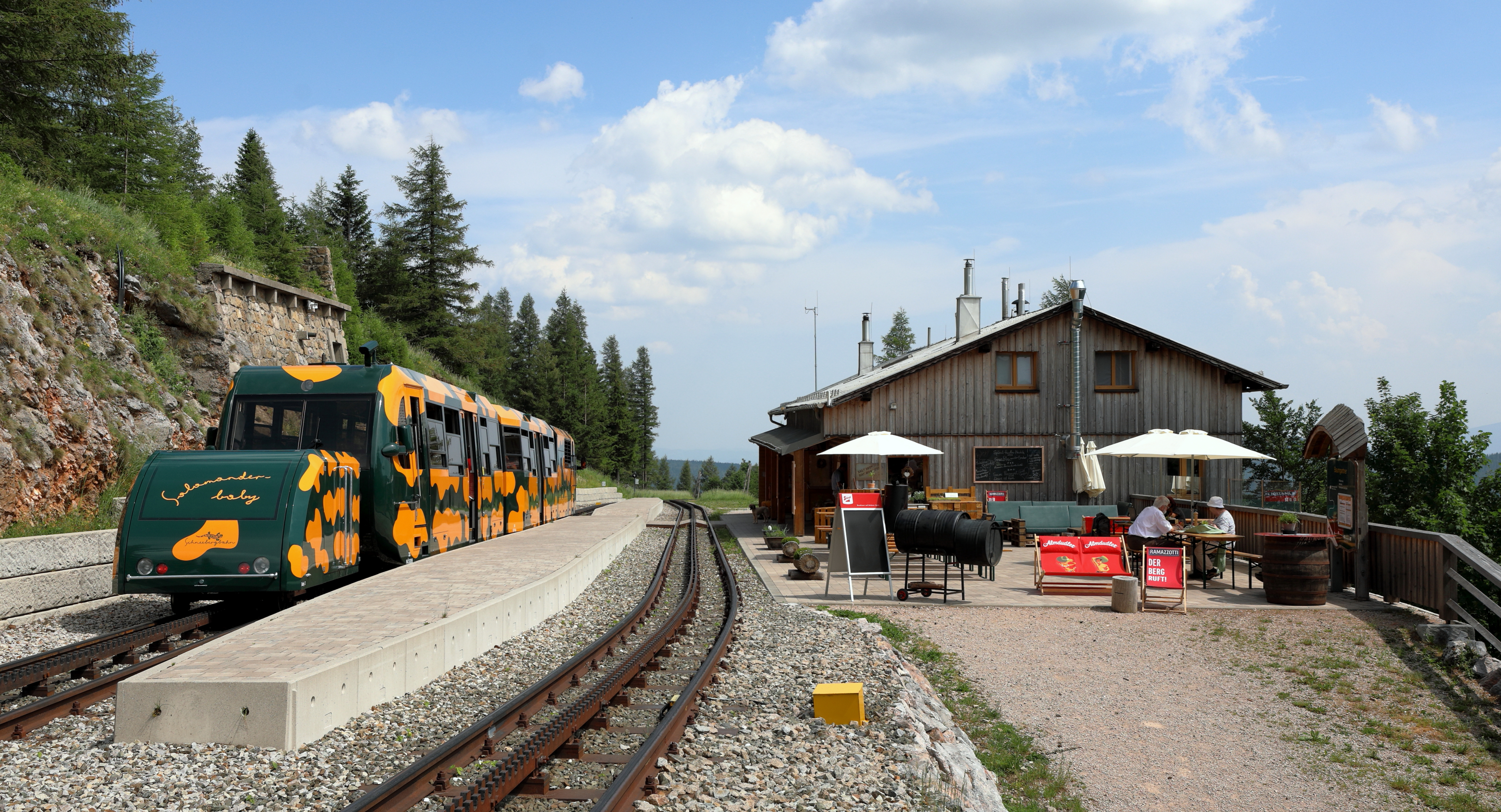
Salamander diesel locomotive at station Baumgartner

The Schneeberg Railway (German: Schneebergbahn) is one of three rack railways in Austria still operating, and runs from the small town of Puchberg am Schneeberg in Lower Austria up to a plateau beneath the Schneeberg summit. At 2,076 metres (6,811 ft), the Schneeberg is the highest mountain in Lower Austria. The other two working cog railways in Austria are the Schafberg Railway (opened in 1893) and the Achensee Railway (opened in 1889).

== History ==
The line is 9.85 kilometres (6.12 mi) long and has a rail gauge of 1,000 mm (3 ft 3 3/8 in), and uses the Abt rack system to overcome a height difference of 1,208 metres (3,963 ft). With the emergence of tourism in the second half of the 19th century, the region experienced a growing number of city dwellers looking for destinations close to Vienna. The area of the Vienna Hausberge ("Viennese Local Mountains"), the Schneeberg and Rax region, soon emerged as a favourite summer resort of Vienna's wealthy residents and lovers of the countryside. The Schneeberg Railway began its operation in 1897. Designed by Leo Arnoldi, it was built between 1895 and 1897 in two sections: a regular, connecting railroad from Wiener Neustadt to Puchberg; and the cog railway from Puchberg to the mountain plateau.

== Ownership ==
Originally operated by the Arnoldi company, whose majority shareholder was the Berlin bank house Landau, the operation was taken over in 1899 by the AG der Eisenbahn Wien–Aspang (EWA) (Vienna-Aspang Rail Company), due to economic problems. From 1937 it was operated by the BBÖ (Bundesbahn Österreich): the Federal Railway of Austria; the predecessor of today's ÖBB: Austrian Federal Railways), which was an independent commercial company after 1923. After 1940 the railway was fully nationalized, a situation lasting until 1990, when the ÖBB announced it was unable to maintain the existing level of service. Therefore, an independent operating company – the Niederösterreichische Schneebergbahn GmbH (Lower Austrian Schneeberg Railway Company Ltd.) – was founded in 1996, with a 50% shareholding owned by the federal state of Lower Austria, and the other 50% held by the ÖBB. Although it was originally operated with steam locomotives, modern diesel locomotives have also been in operation since 1999. These came from Hunslet-Barclay, Kilmarnock, Scotland.

== Austrian rack railways no longer operating ==
(Operating dates for passenger traffic in brackets)

- Erzberg Railway (1872–1978). The last rack-railway engine was in use until 1978, when the route was electrified and converted into an adhesion railway. In 1980, despite public protest and a petition, the rack was completely removed. After 1988, there were no more ore trains to the furnaces of Vordernberg and Donawitz and the route was decommissioned. The Zahnradbahn Verein (Cog Railway Society) has operated a heritage train on the Erzberg Railway since 1990, and in 2003 the Verein Erzbergbahn (Erzbergbahn Society) bought the tracks, stations and rolling stock from the ÖBB and continues to operate it as a tourist and heritage adhesion railway on a voluntary basis.
- Gaisberg Railway (1892–1928) in Salzburg; replaced by the Gaisberg Parkway (Gaisbergstraße).
- Kahlenberg Railway (1873–1921) in Vienna. Austria's first cog railway was built between 1872 and 1873 for the 1873 World's Fair. Due to World War I, electrification, which had been planned since 1912, could not be completed. The lack of coal and sufficient passengers after the war led to its closure.

== See also ==
- List of highest railways in Europe
