= Wayside shrine =

Religious image, usually in some sort of small shelter, placed by a road or pathway

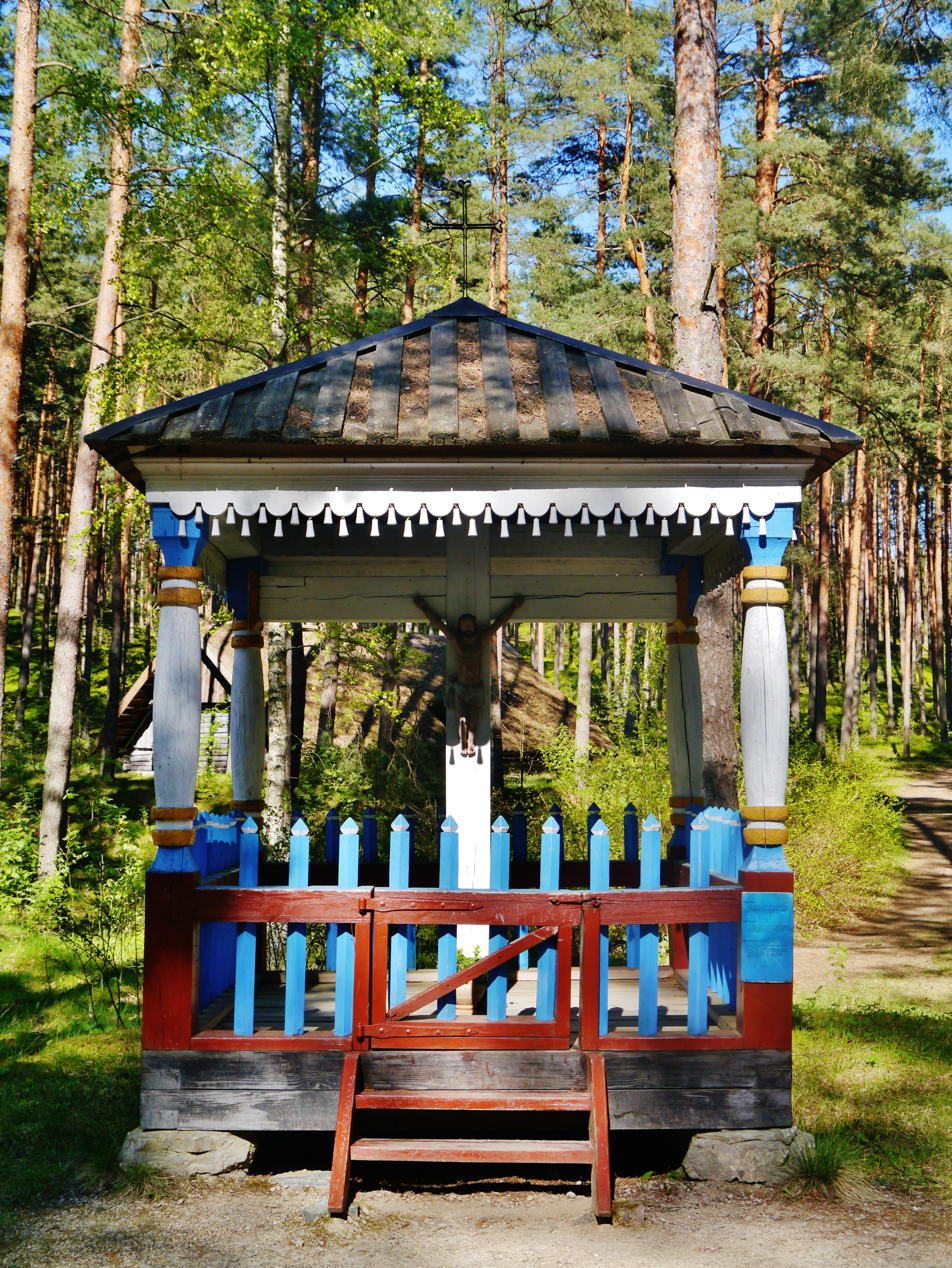
19th century Latgalian Catholic wayside shrine at The Ethnographic Open-Air Museum of Latvia

A wayside shrine is a religious image, usually in some sort of small shelter, placed by a road or pathway, sometimes in a settlement or at a crossroads, but often in the middle of an empty stretch of country road, or at the top of a hill or mountain. They have been a feature of many cultures, including Chinese folk religious communities, Catholic and Orthodox Europe and some Asian regions.

== The origins of wayside shrines ==
Wayside shrines were often erected to honor the memory of the victim of an accident, which explains their prevalence near roads and paths; in Carinthia, for example, they often stand at crossroads. Some commemorate a specific incident near the place; either a death in an accident or escape from harm. Other icons commemorate the victims of the plague. The very grand medieval English Eleanor crosses were erected by her husband to commemorate the nightly resting places of the journey made by the body of Queen Eleanor of Castile as it returned to London in the 1290s. Some make it clear by an inscription or notice that a specific dead person is commemorated, but most do not.

Wayside shrines were also erected along old pilgrim routes, such as the Via Sacra that leads from Vienna to Mariazell. Some mark parish or other boundaries, such as the edge or a landholding, or have a function as convenient markers for travelers to find their way. Shrines and calvaries are furthermore frequently noted on maps and therefore represent important orientation aids.

== Europe ==
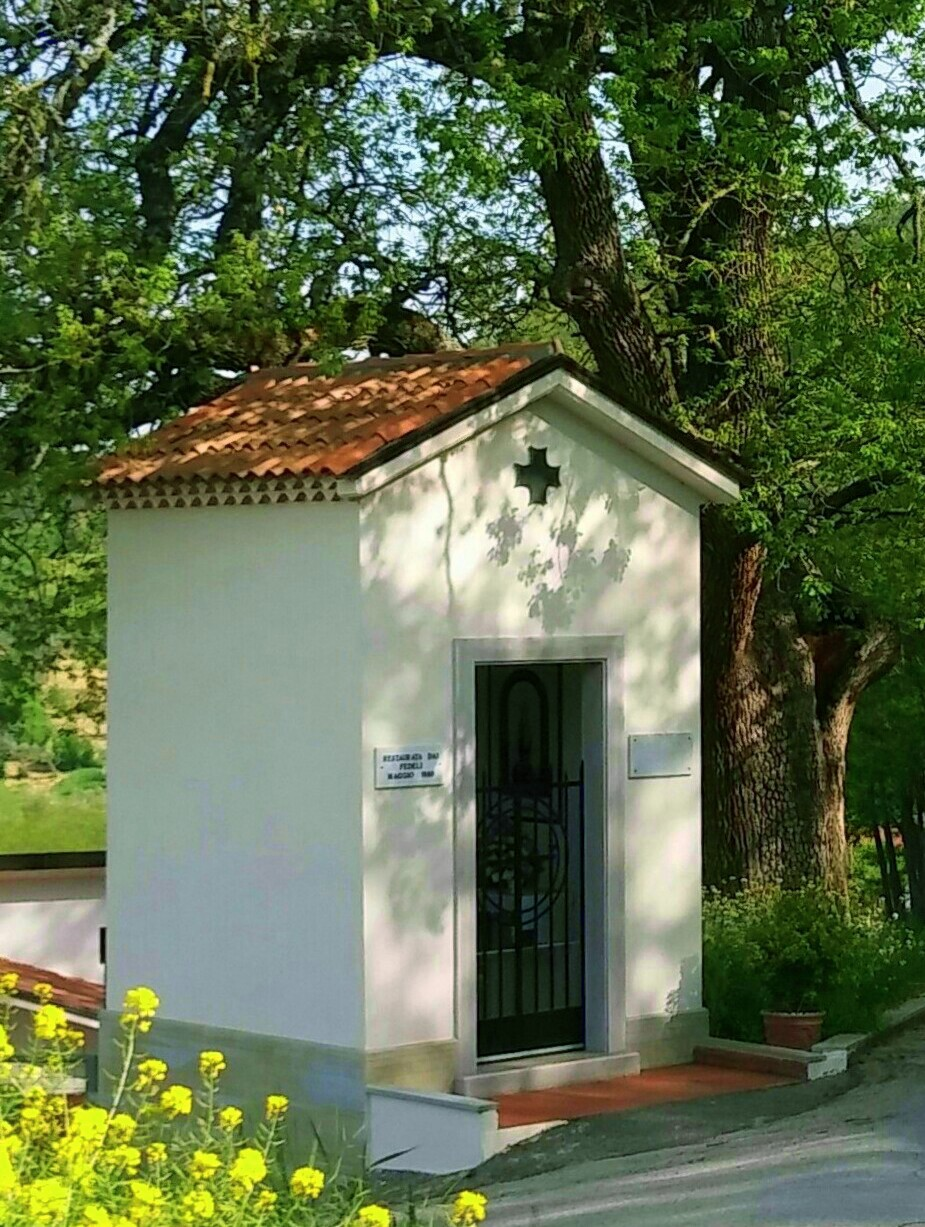
A wayside shrine in a wood near Ariano Irpino, Italy

The pre-Christian cultures of Europe had similar shrines of various types; many runestones may have been in this category, though they are often in the nature of a memorial to a dead person. Few Christian shrines survive in predominantly Protestant countries, but they remain common in many parts of Catholic and Orthodox Europe, often being repaired or replaced as they fall into disrepair, and relocated as roads are moved or widened. The most common subjects are a plain cross or a crucifix, or an image of the Virgin Mary, but saints or other scenes may also be shown. The surviving large stone high crosses of Celtic Christianity, and the related stone Anglo-Saxon crosses (mostly damaged or destroyed after the Protestant Reformation) are sometimes outside churches, but often not, and these may have functioned as preaching crosses, or in some cases just been wayside shrines. The calvaires of Brittany in France, are especially large stone shrines showing the Crucifixion, but these are typically in villages.

In Greece they may be called kandilakia (Greek: καντηλάκια) or εικονοστάσιο στην άκρη του δρόμου (ikonostásio stin akri tu drómu, literally "shrine at the roadside"). They are commonly built in the memory of a fatal car accident and usually include a photograph of the victim(s), their namesake Saint and sometimes personal items. They may also be built from car accident survivors thanking the saint who protected them.

Poland is one of the few European countries where the custom of singing Maytime hymns, majówki, at wayside shrines still survives.

== Asia ==
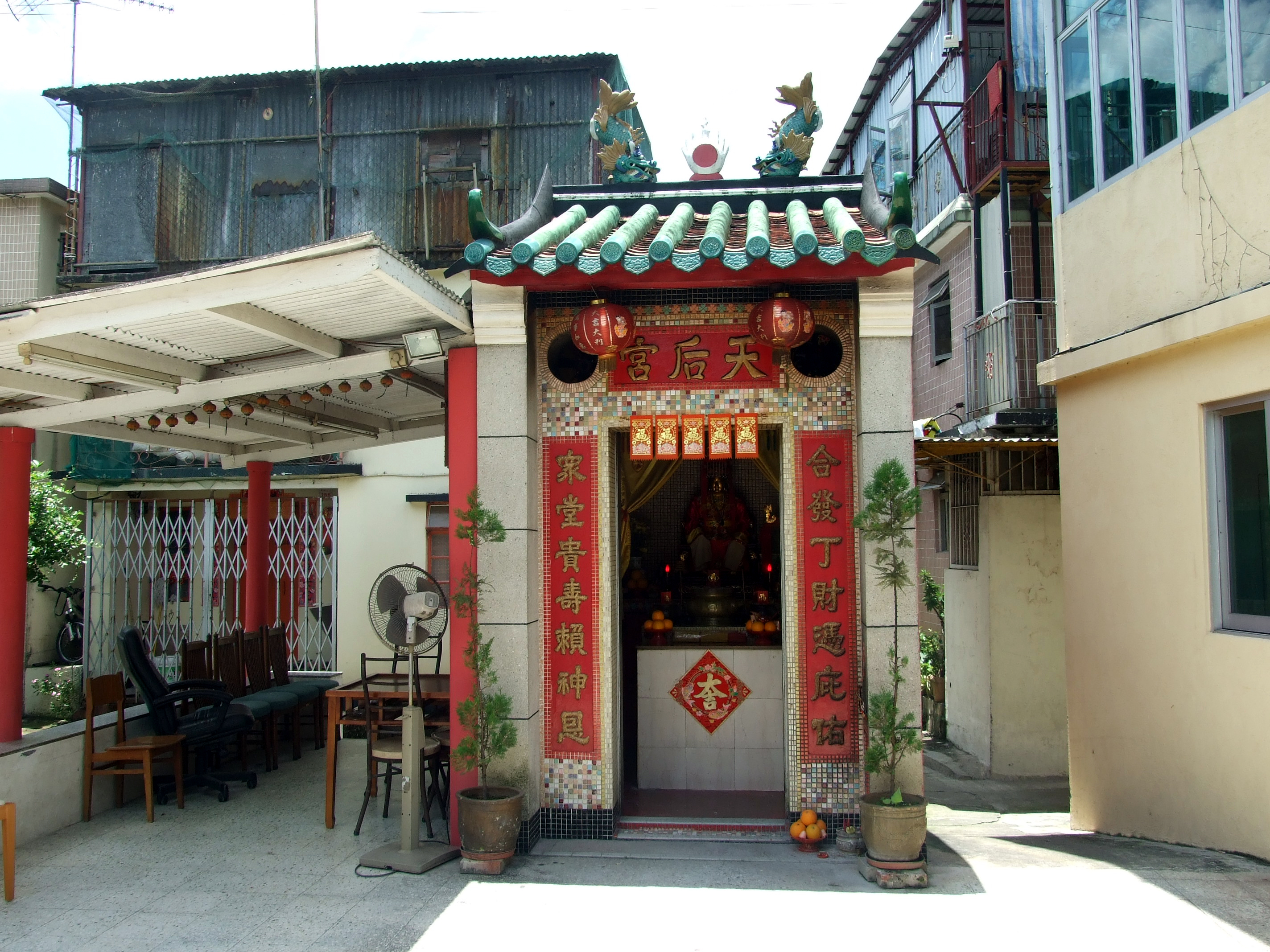
Shrine dedicated to Tin Hau in Hong Kong

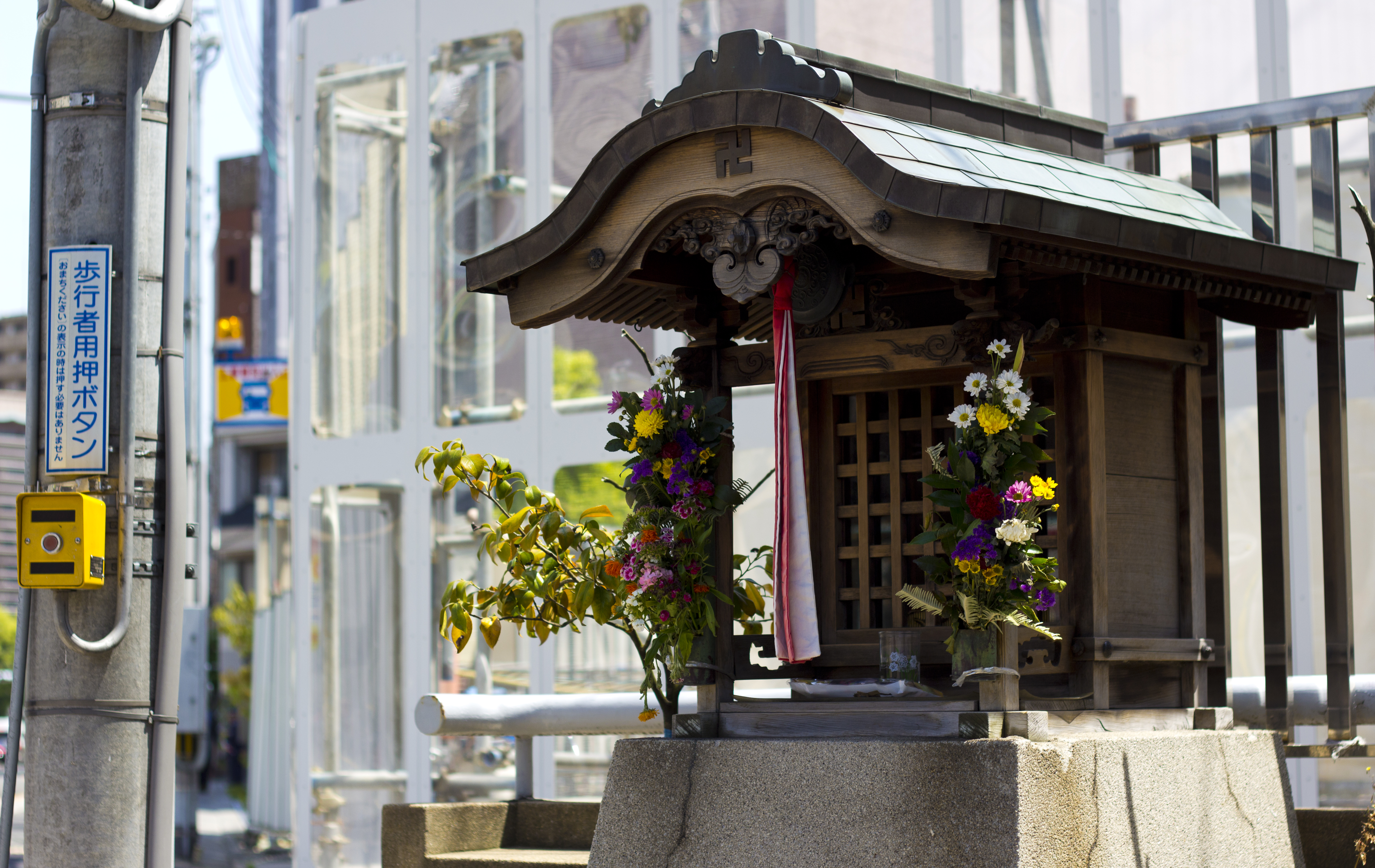
Wayside shrine (hokora) in Kyoto

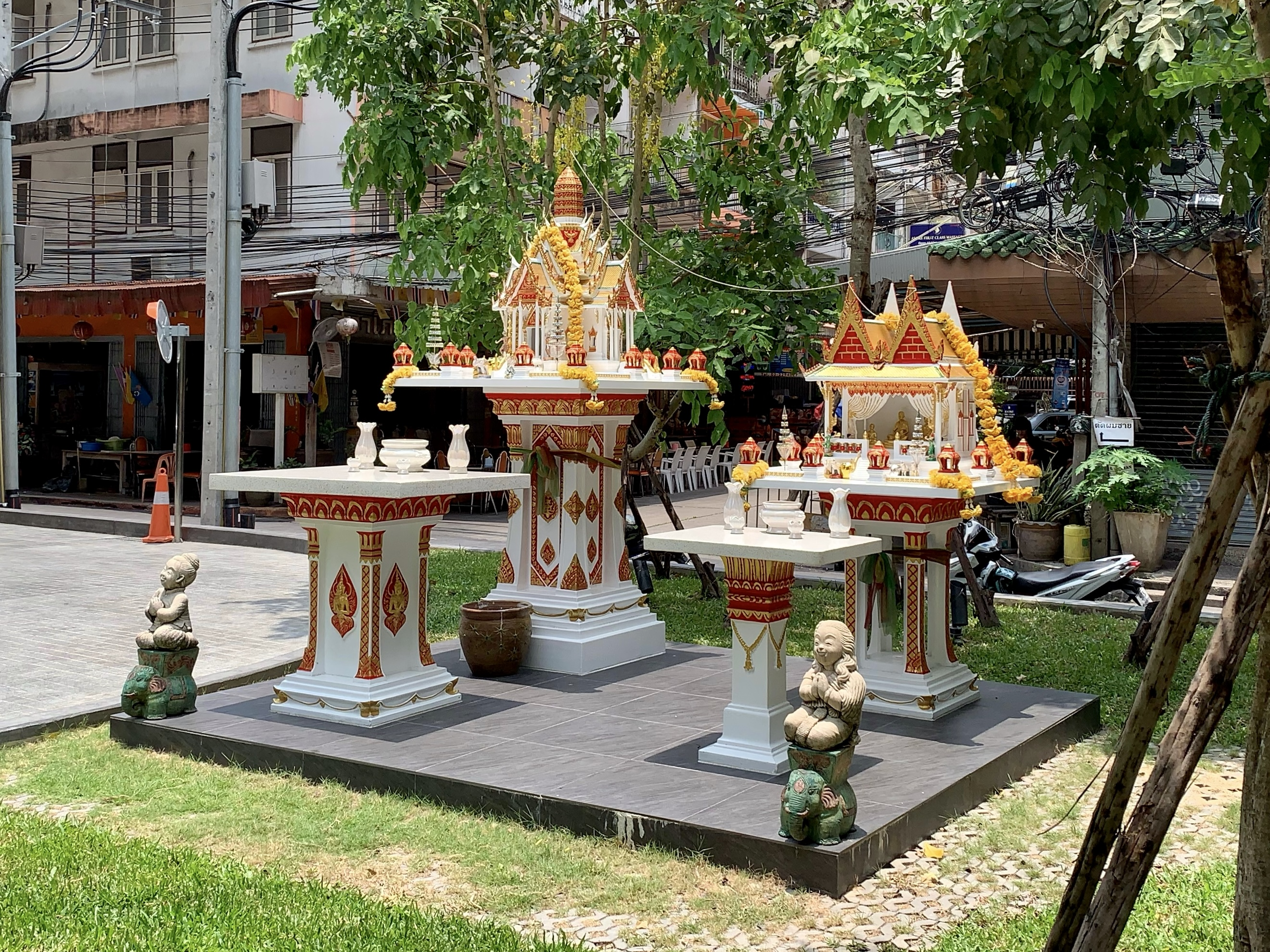
Spirit houses in Bangkok, Thailand

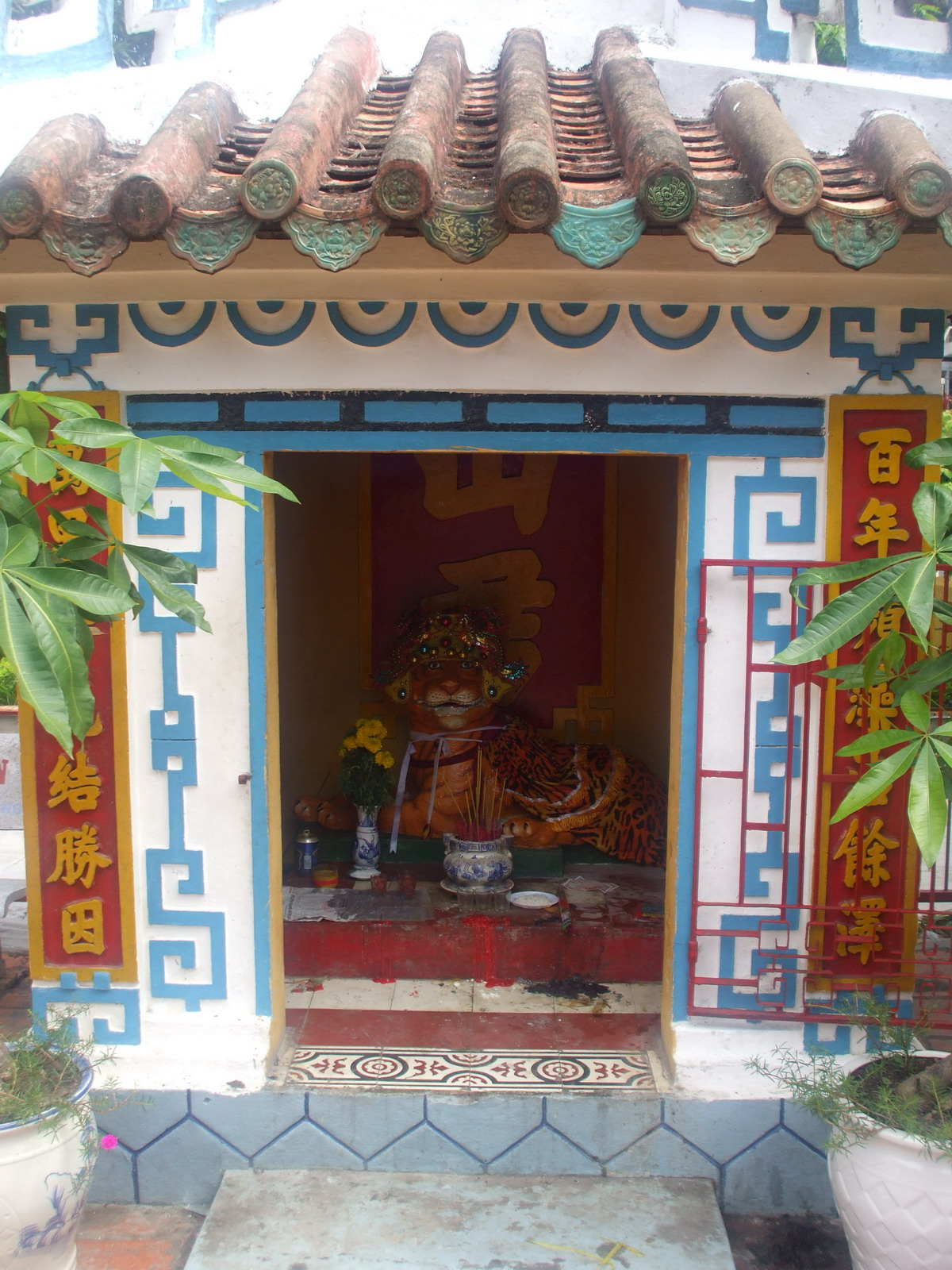
Wayside shrine in An Giang, Vietnam

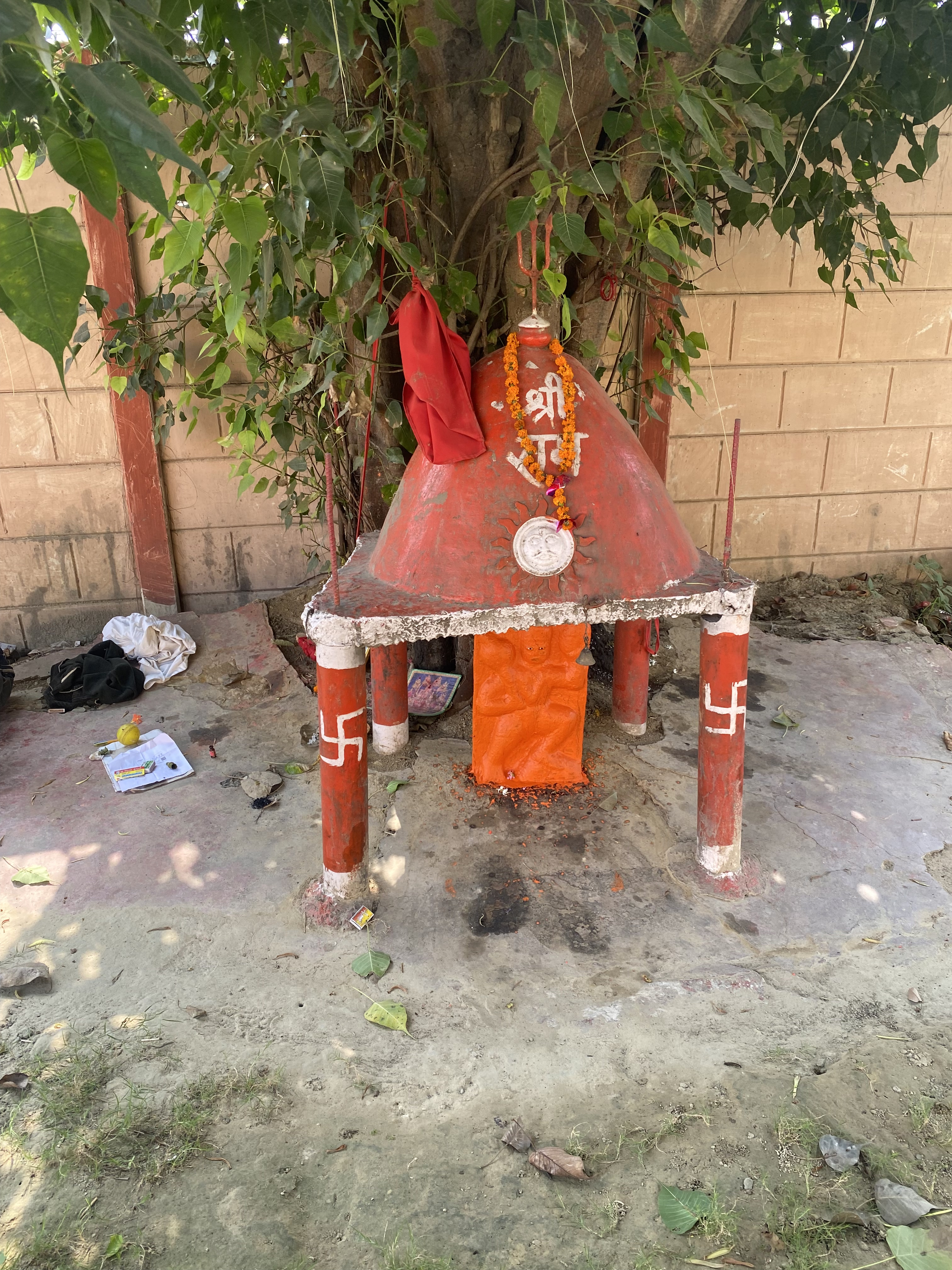
Wayside shrine in Ayodhya, India

Wayside shrines in Asia

Wayside shrines exist throughout India alongside other features of public faith, including lingams, ghats, and kunds. This creates what is described by Vinayak Bharne as a faithscape, a human landscape defined by the role of religion in the public sphere. The majority of these shrines are Hindu, and their public nature and rootedness to place leads them to be described as key expressions of working-class religiosity. Wayside shrines provide meeting points for the micro-communities who partake in religious practice as well as maintenance of the objects. Their presence within an increasingly urban environment creates a "parallel urbanism" which refutes secular notions of religion ebbing away as a society becomes more developed.

== Types of shrines ==
Wayside shrines are found in a variety of styles, ranging from simpler column shrines and Schöpflöffel shrines to more elaborate chapel-shrines. Some have only flat painted surfaces, while other shrines are decorated with reliefs or with religious statues. Some feature a small kneeling platform, so that the faithful may pray in front of the image. A common wayside shrine seen throughout the Alpine regions of Europe, especially Germany, Austria and northern Italy, is the Alpine style crucifix wayside shrine. This style often has elaborate wood carvings and usually consists of a crucifix surrounded by a roof and shelter.

=== Column shrines ===
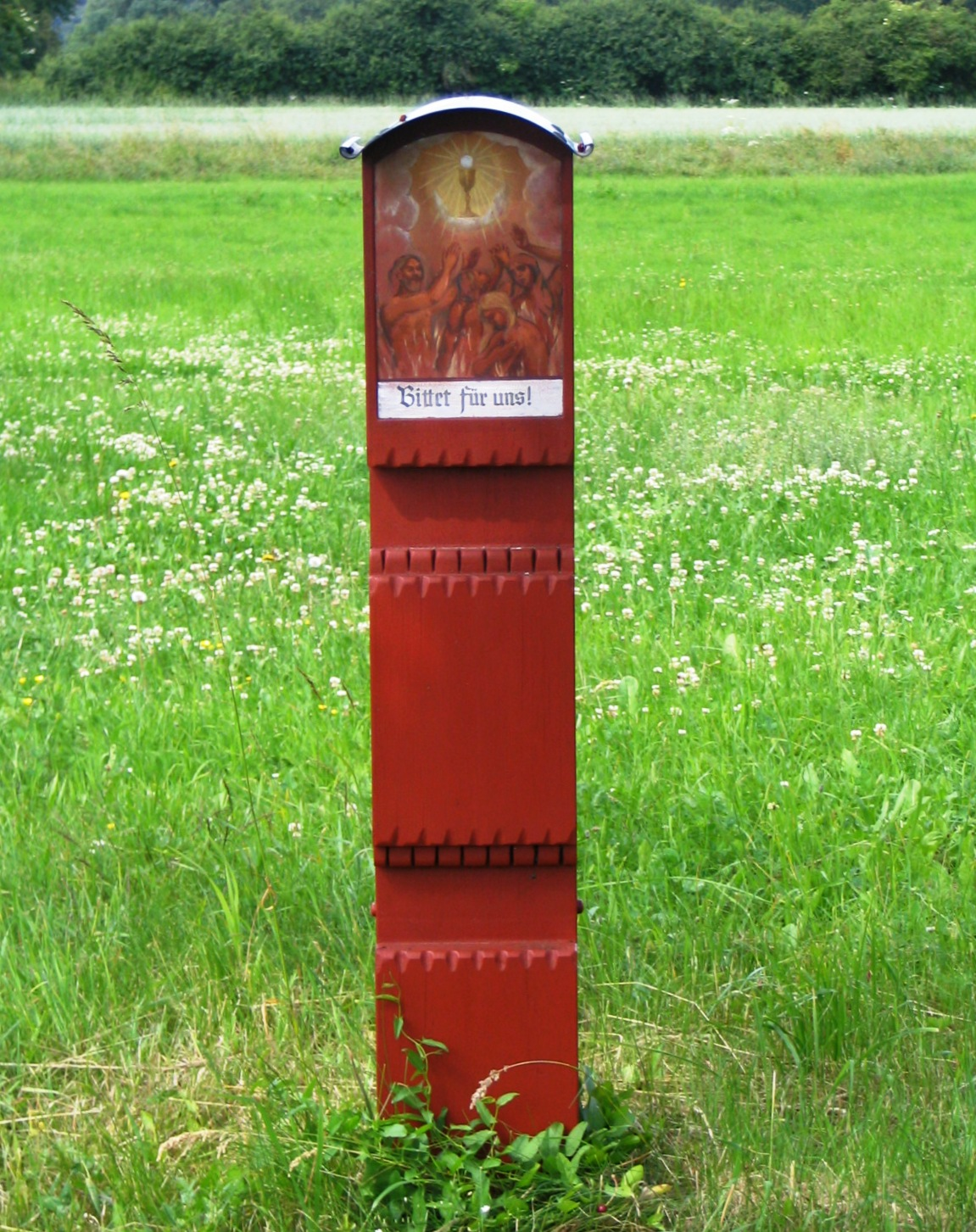
Wooden column shrine in Garsdorf, Bavaria

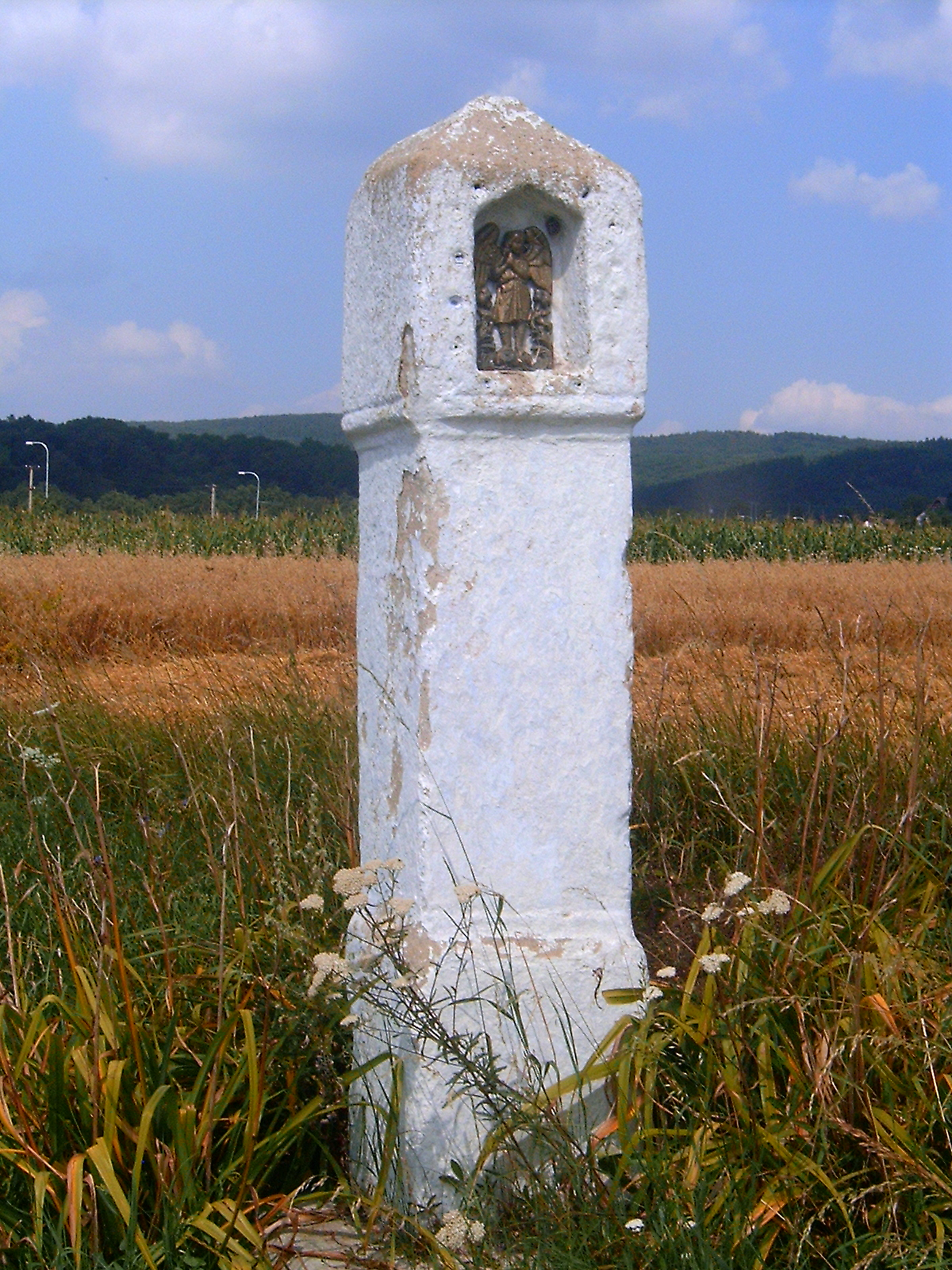
Stone column shrine in Vřesovice, Czech Republic

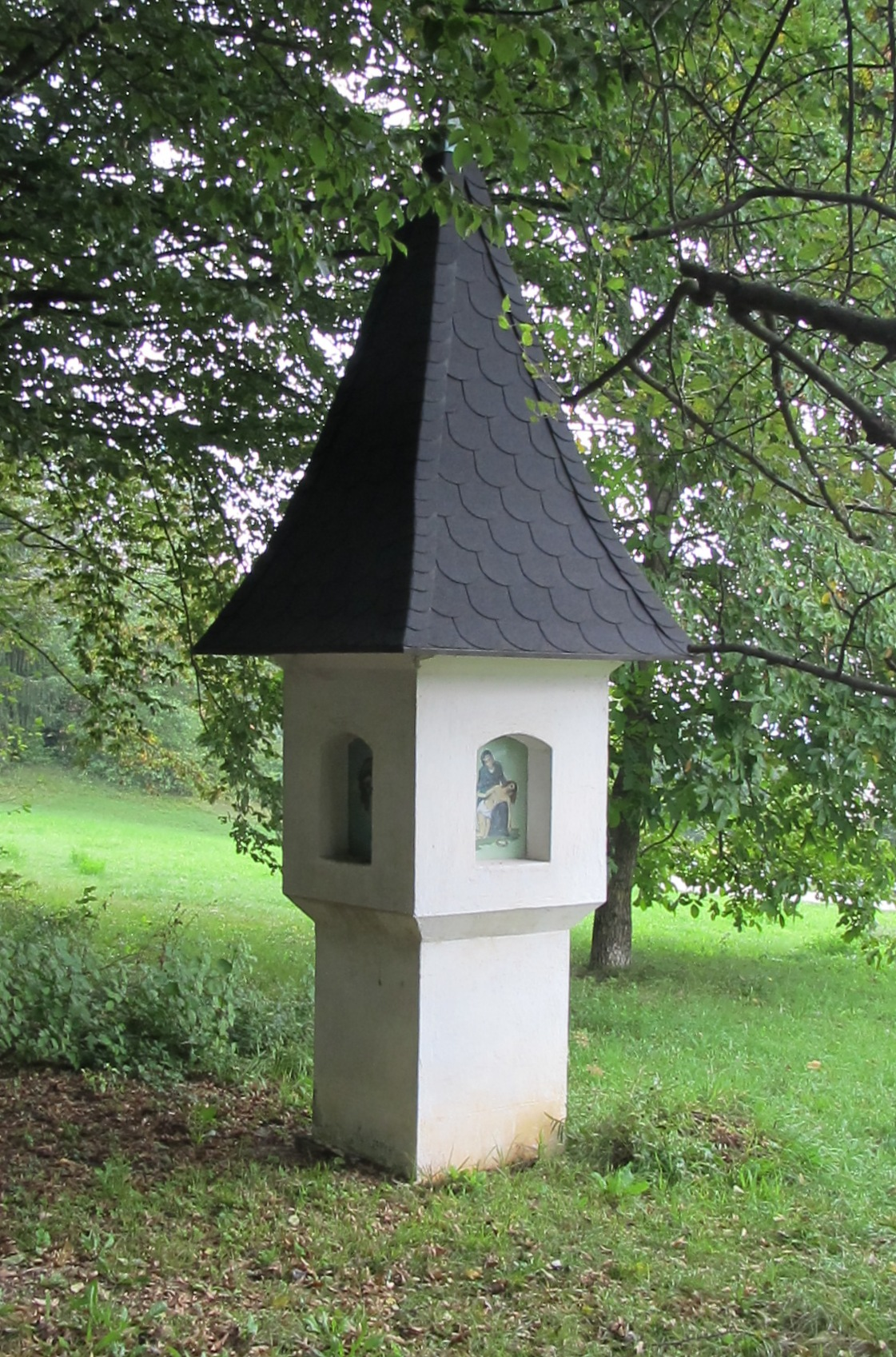
Roofed column shrine in Mali Lipoglav, Slovenia

Column shrines

A column shrine (German: Bildstock, also Marterl, Helgenstöckli, or Wegstock; Slovene: slopno znamenje; Lithuanian: koplytstulpis) normally resembles a pole or a pillar, made either of wood or of masonry, and is sometimes capped with a roof. The Austrian/south German designation Marterl hearkens back to the Greek martyros 'martyr'. In a setting resembling a tabernacle, there is usually a picture or a figure of Christ or a saint. For this reason, flowers or prayer candles are often placed on or at the foot of the shrine.

In Germany, they are most common in Franconia, in the Catholic parts of Baden, Swabia, in the Alpine regions and Catholic areas of the historical region of Eichsfeld and in Upper Lusatia. In Austria, they are to be found in the Alpine regions, as well as in great numbers in the Weinviertel, the Mühlviertel and in the Waldviertel. There are also similar structures in the South Bohemian Region and the South Moravian Region. In Czech, column shrines are traditionally called "boží muka" (= divine sufferings).

=== Schöpflöffel shrines ===
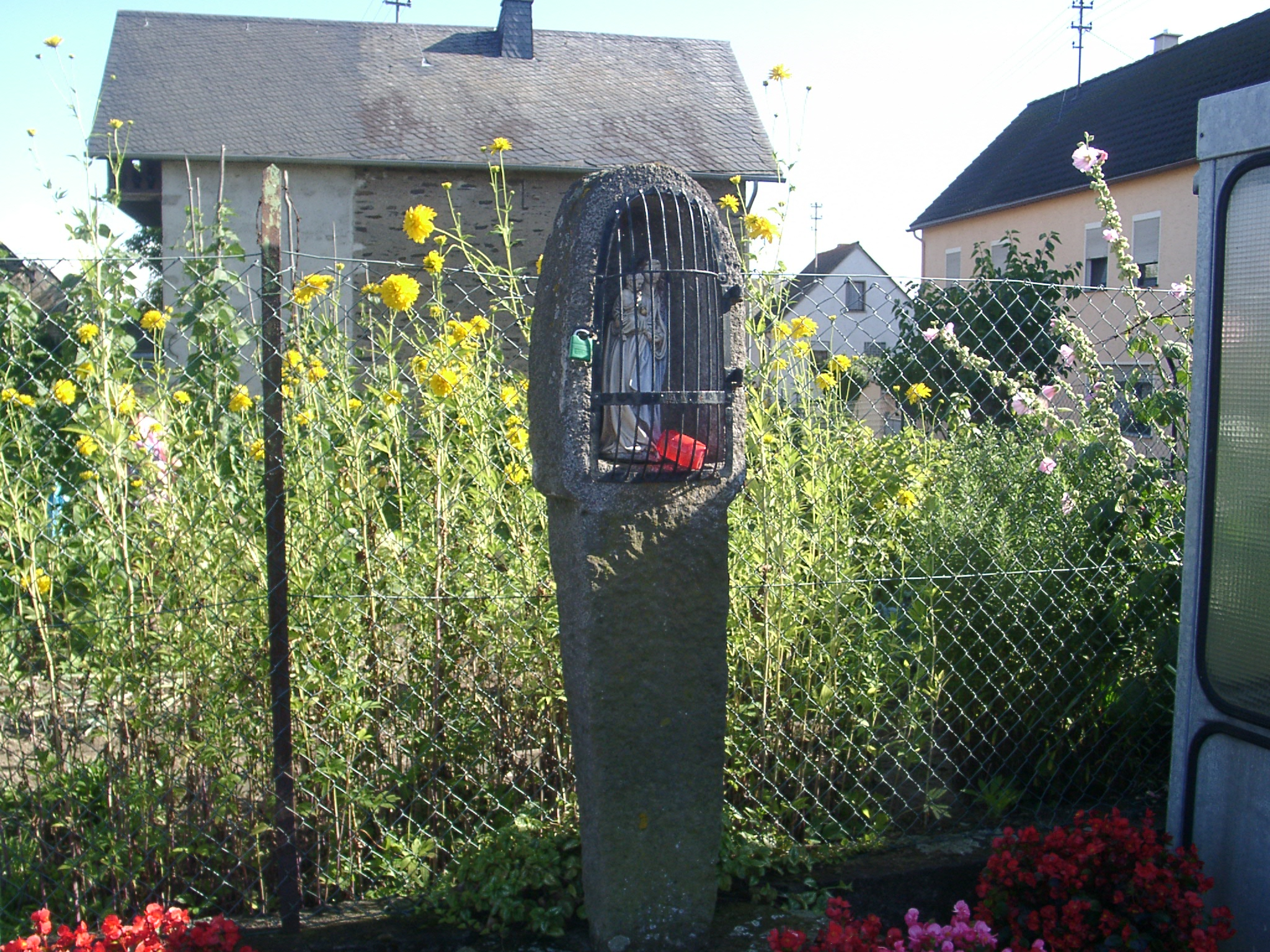
Schöpflöffel shrine near Einig with an image of Mary

In the Eifel in particular, shrines that consist of a pillar with a niche for a depiction of a saint are known as Schöpflöffel (German for 'ladle' or 'serving spoon'). Some of these icons date from the Late Middle Ages, but for the most part were put up in the 16th century.

Near Arnstadt in Thuringia, there is a medieval shrine that is over two metres tall and that has two niches. According to a legend recorded by Ludwig Bechstein, this shrine was once a giant’s spoon, and it is therefore known as the Riesenlöffel.

=== Chapel-shrines ===
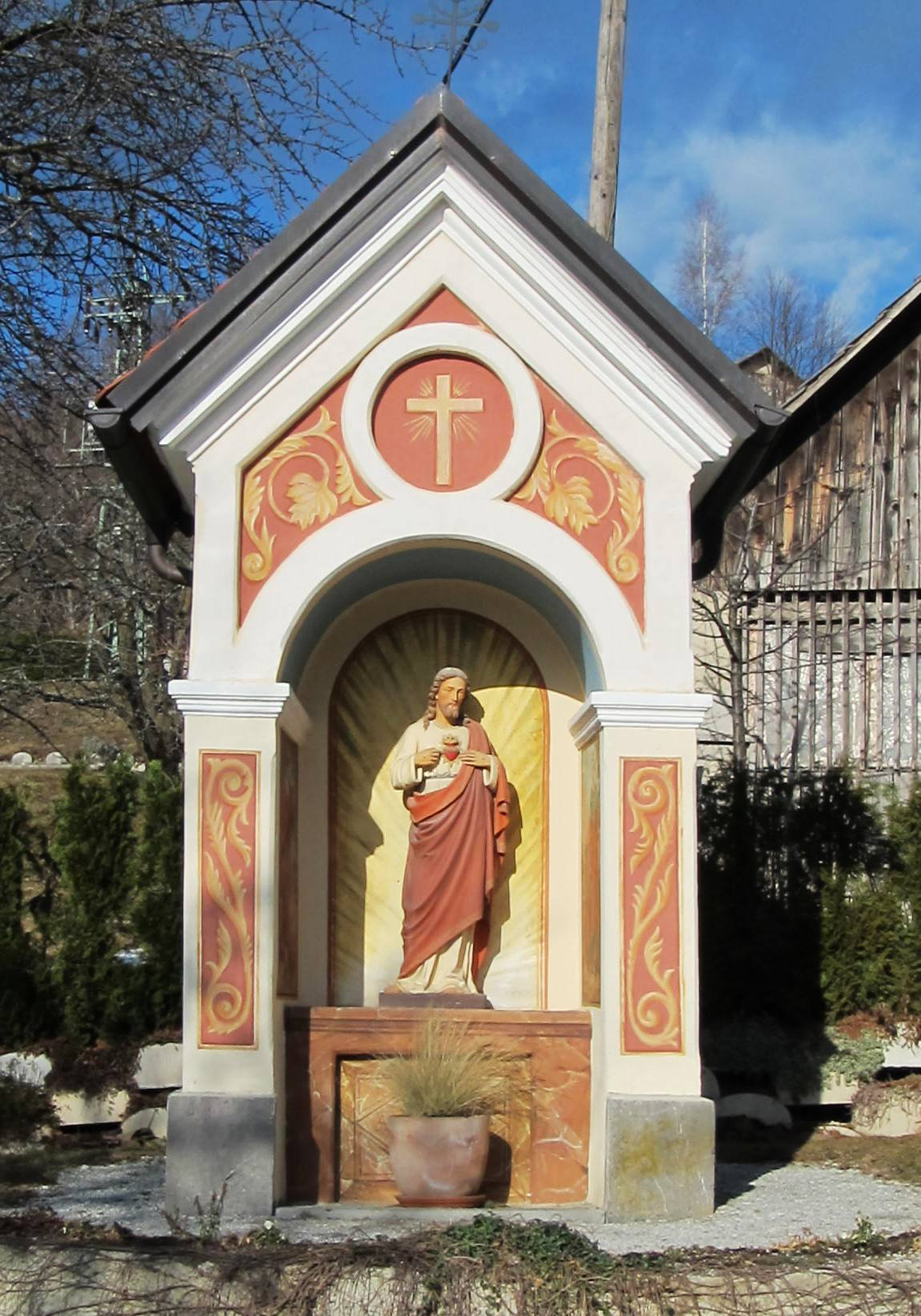
Open chapel-shrine in Topol pri Medvodah

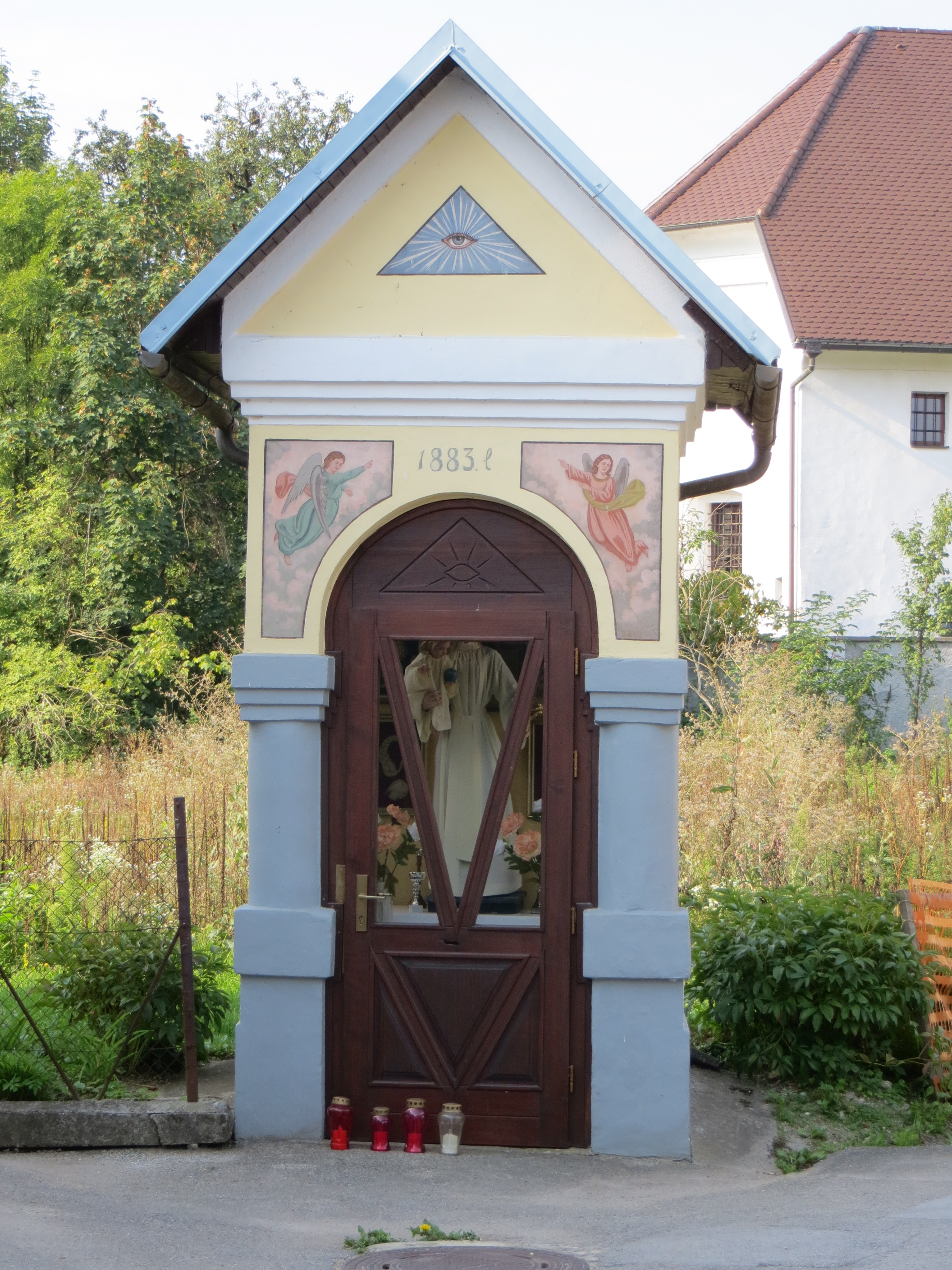
Closed chapel-shrine in Trboje

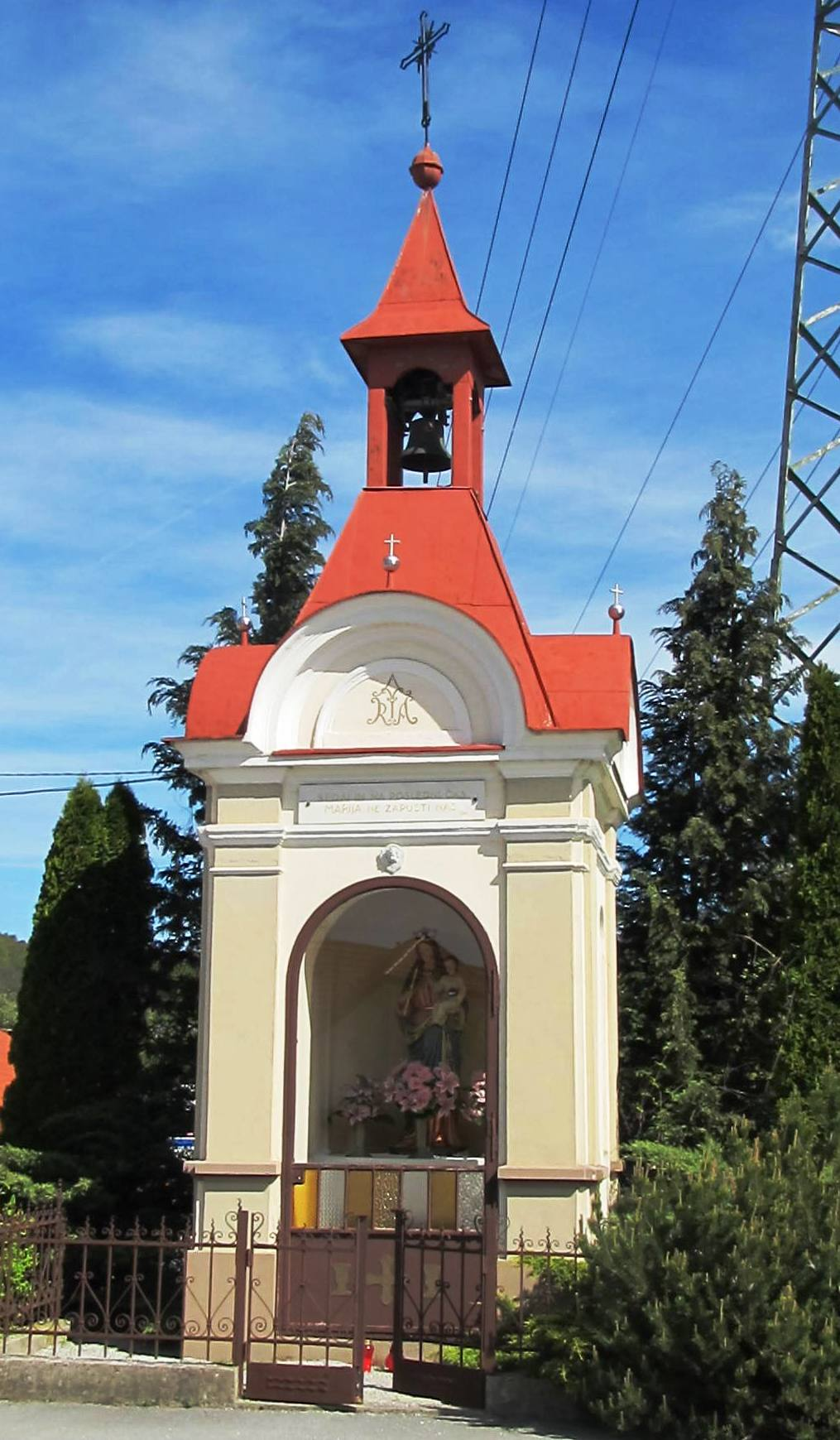
Belfry chapel-shrine in Ljubljana

Slovenian chapel-shrines

Chapel-shrines, built to resemble a small building, are common in Slovenia. They are generally too small to accommodate people and often have only a niche (occasionally, a small altar) to display a depiction of a saint. The main two varieties generally distinguished in Slovenia are the open chapel-shrine (Slovene: kapelica odprtega tipa, odprti tip kapelice), which has no doors, and the closed chapel-shrine (kapelica zaprtega tipa, zaprti tip kapelice), which has a door. The closed chapel-shrine is the older form, with examples known from the 17th century onward. The earliest open chapel-shrines date from the 19th century. Also known in Slovenia are the belfry chapel-shrine (kapelica - zvonik) and the polygonal chapel-shrine (poligonalna kapelica).

Chapel-shrines, known as kapliczka, are also often found in Poland.

In the Czech Republic, chapel-shrines are called výklenková kaple 'niche chapels' and are characterized as a type of chapel (kaple) in Czech. In Moravia, they are also called poklona 'bow, tribute'.

== Gallery ==
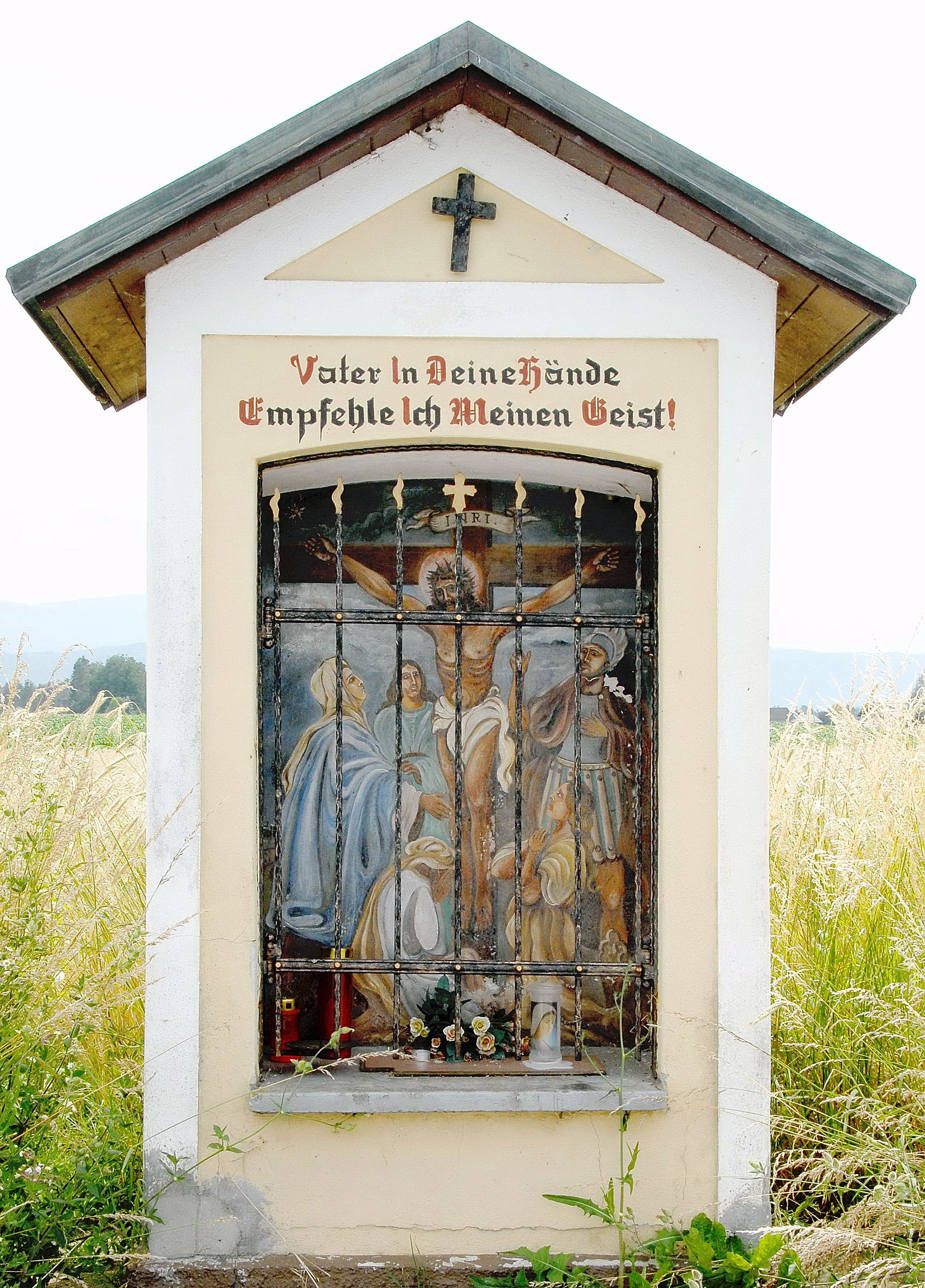
A shrine to the east of Pubersdorf in Austria

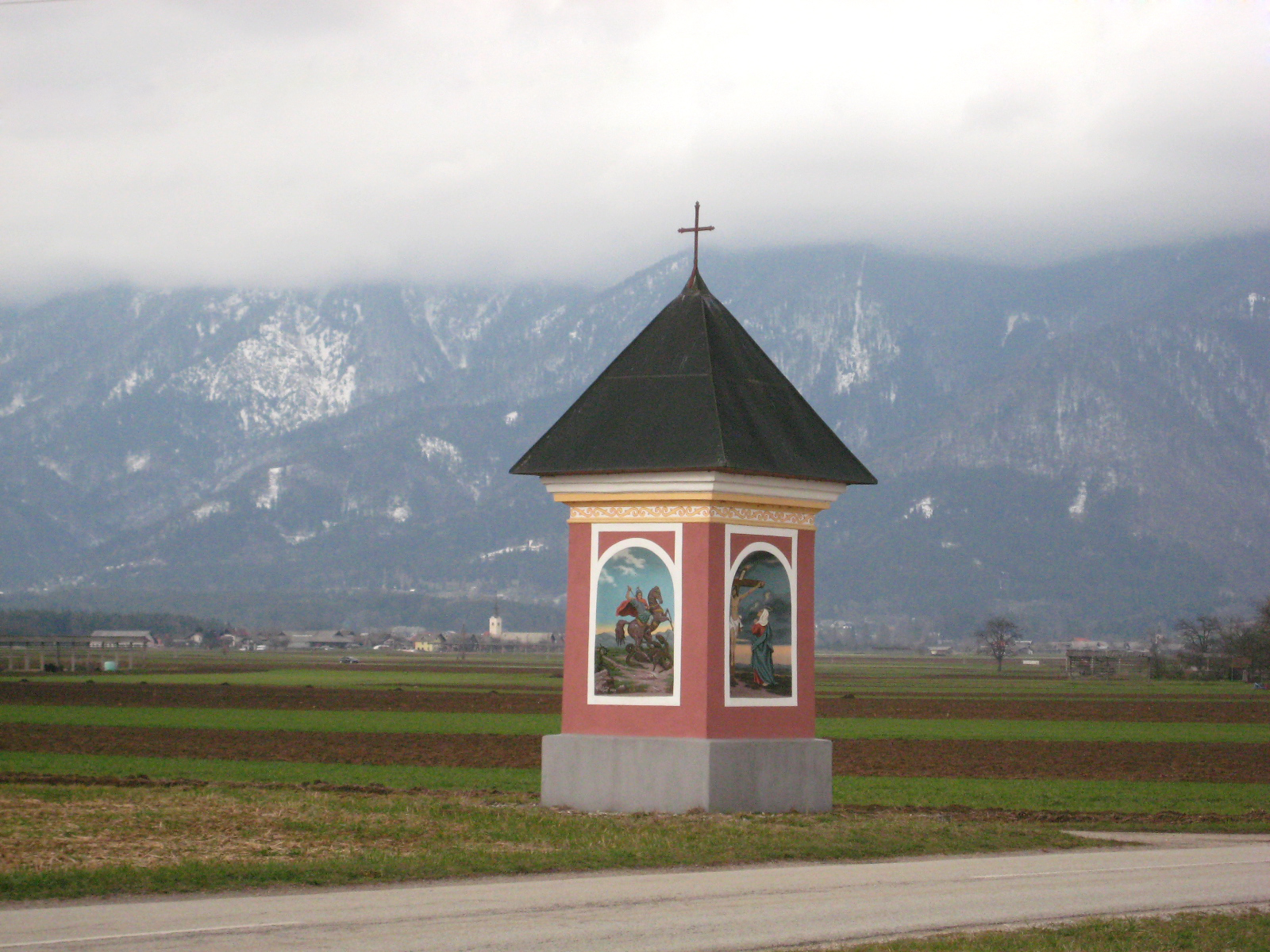
A shrine near Luže in Slovenia

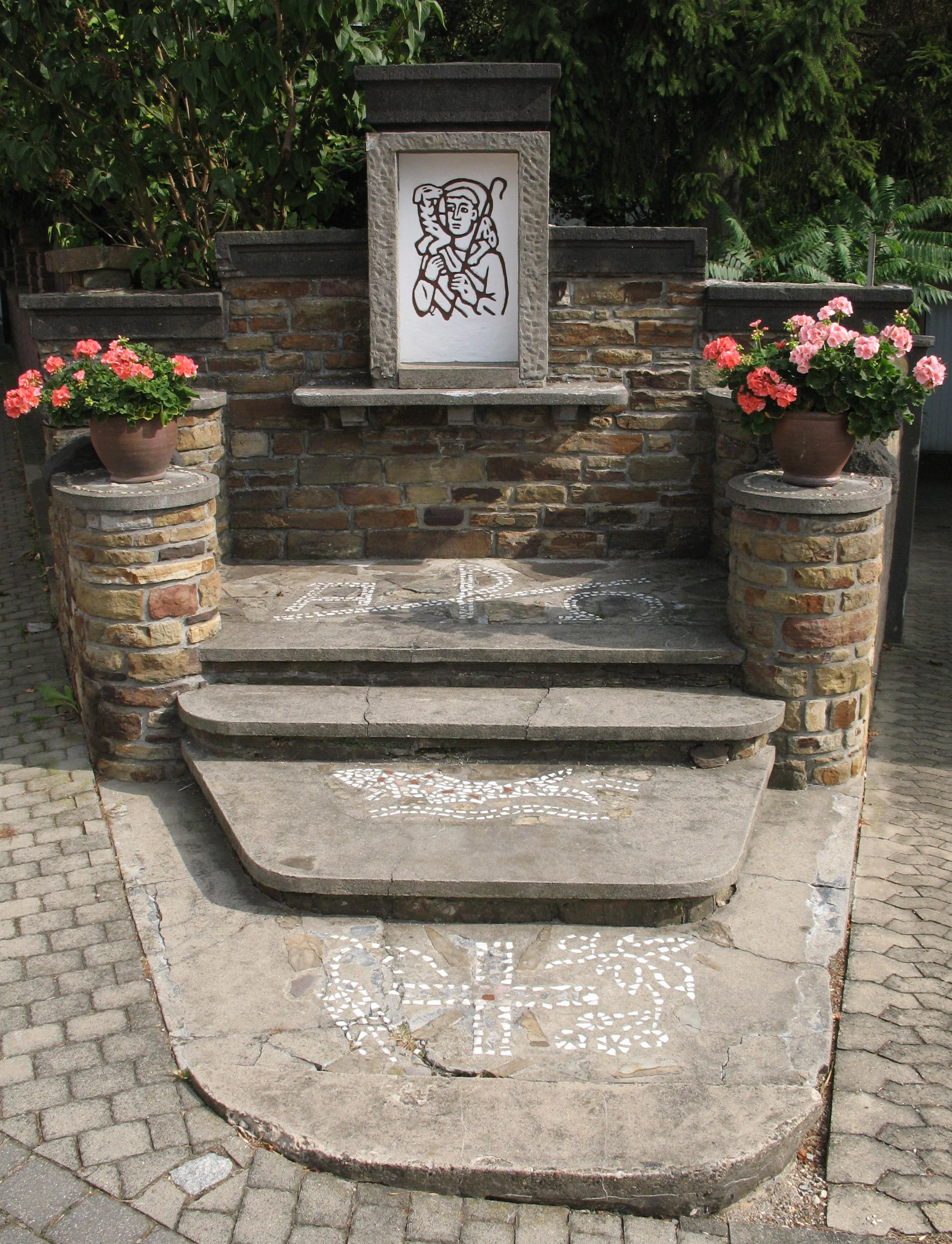
A shrine in Waldorf in Germany

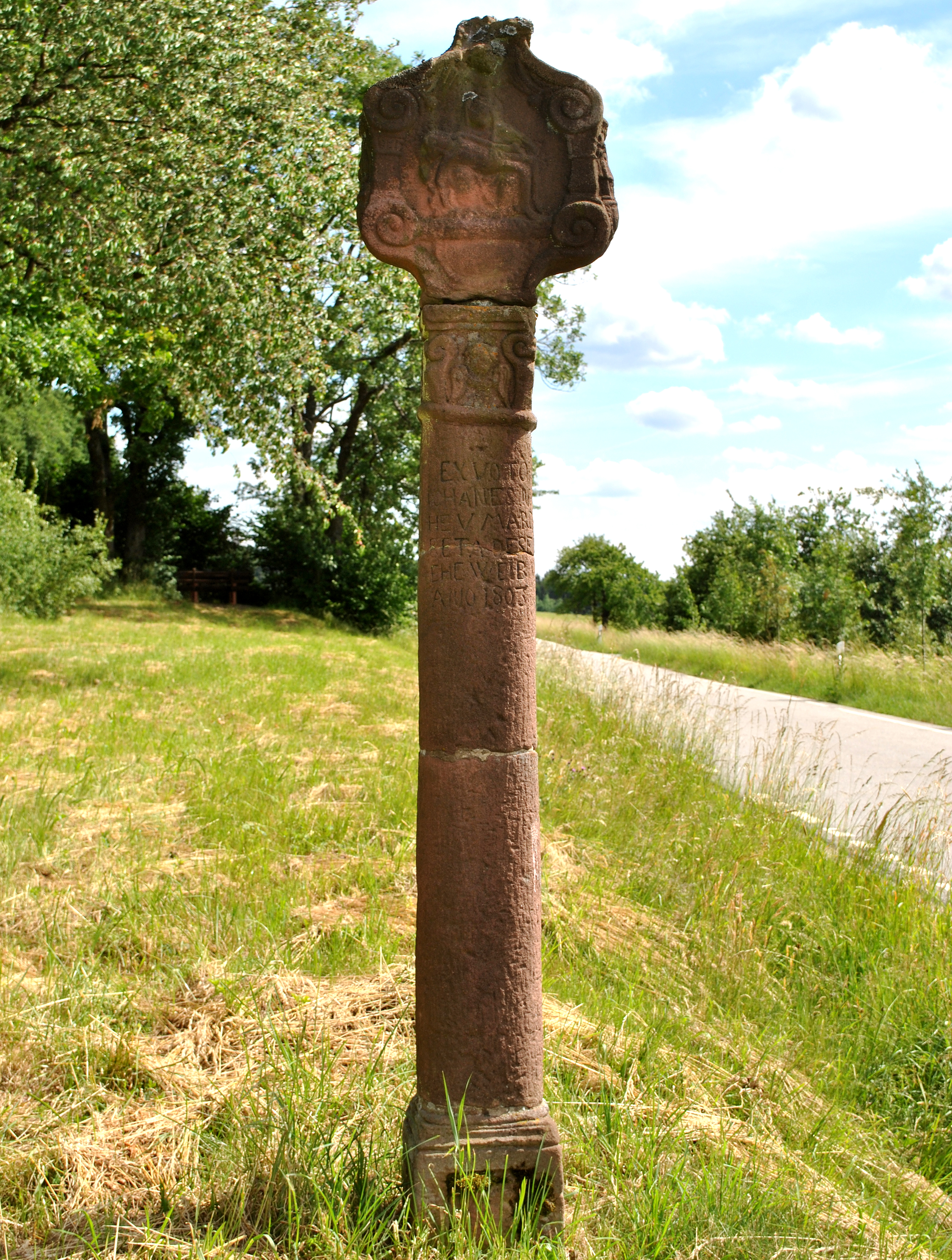
A shrine in Hesselbach, Germany

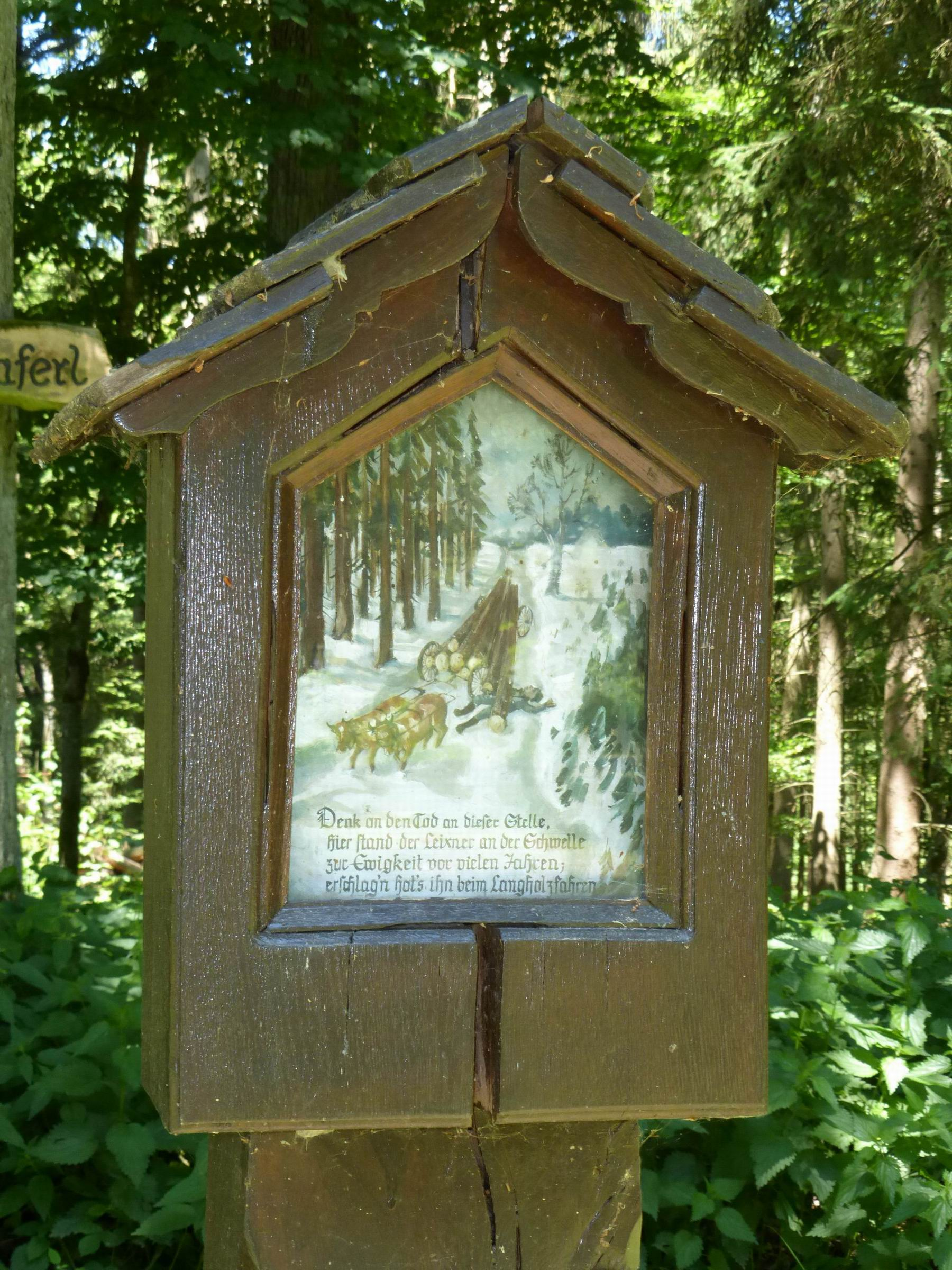
Shrine "Leixnertaferl" near Neustadt an der Donau in Lower Bavaria

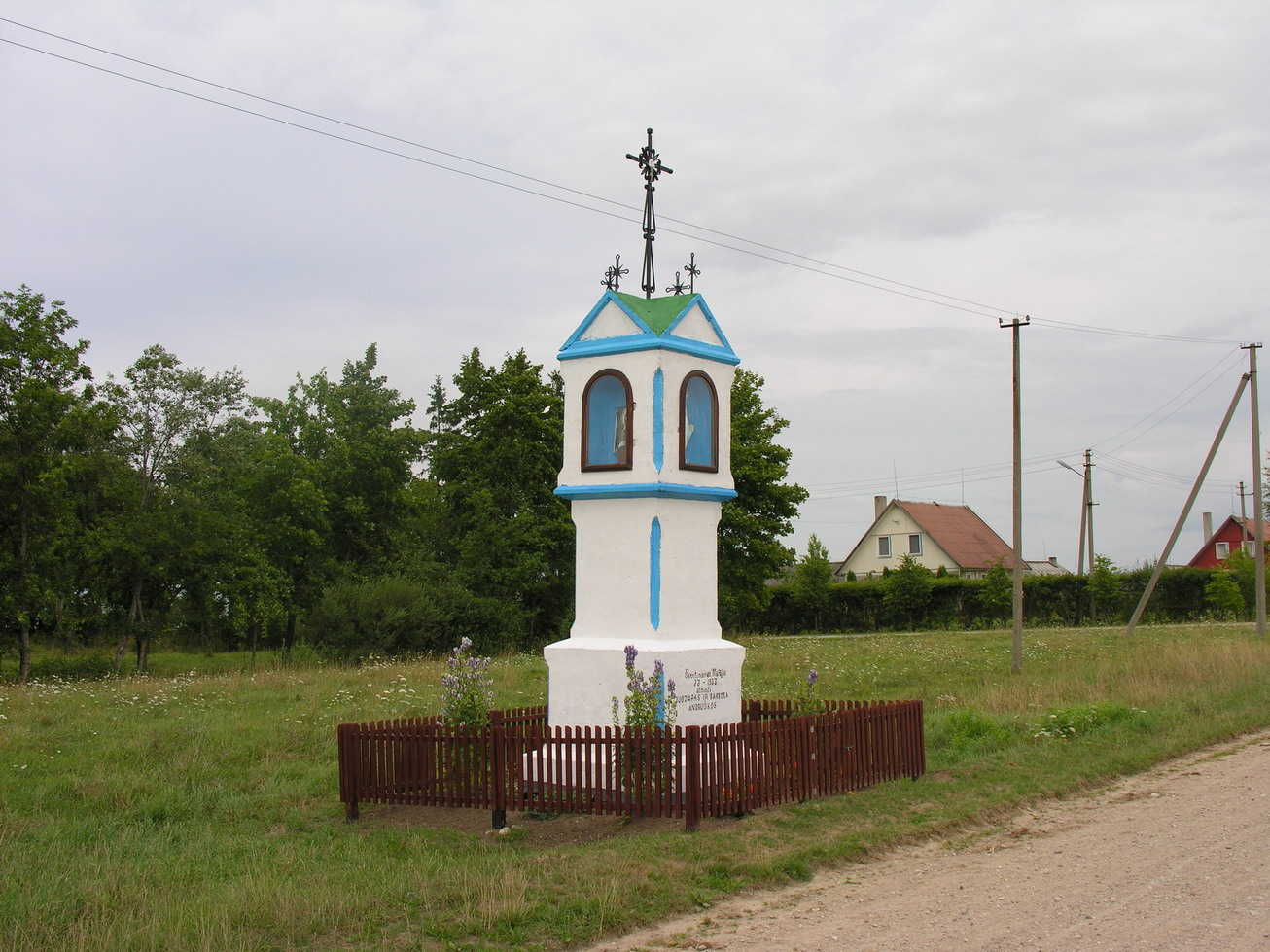
Wayside shrine in Auksūdys, Lithuania

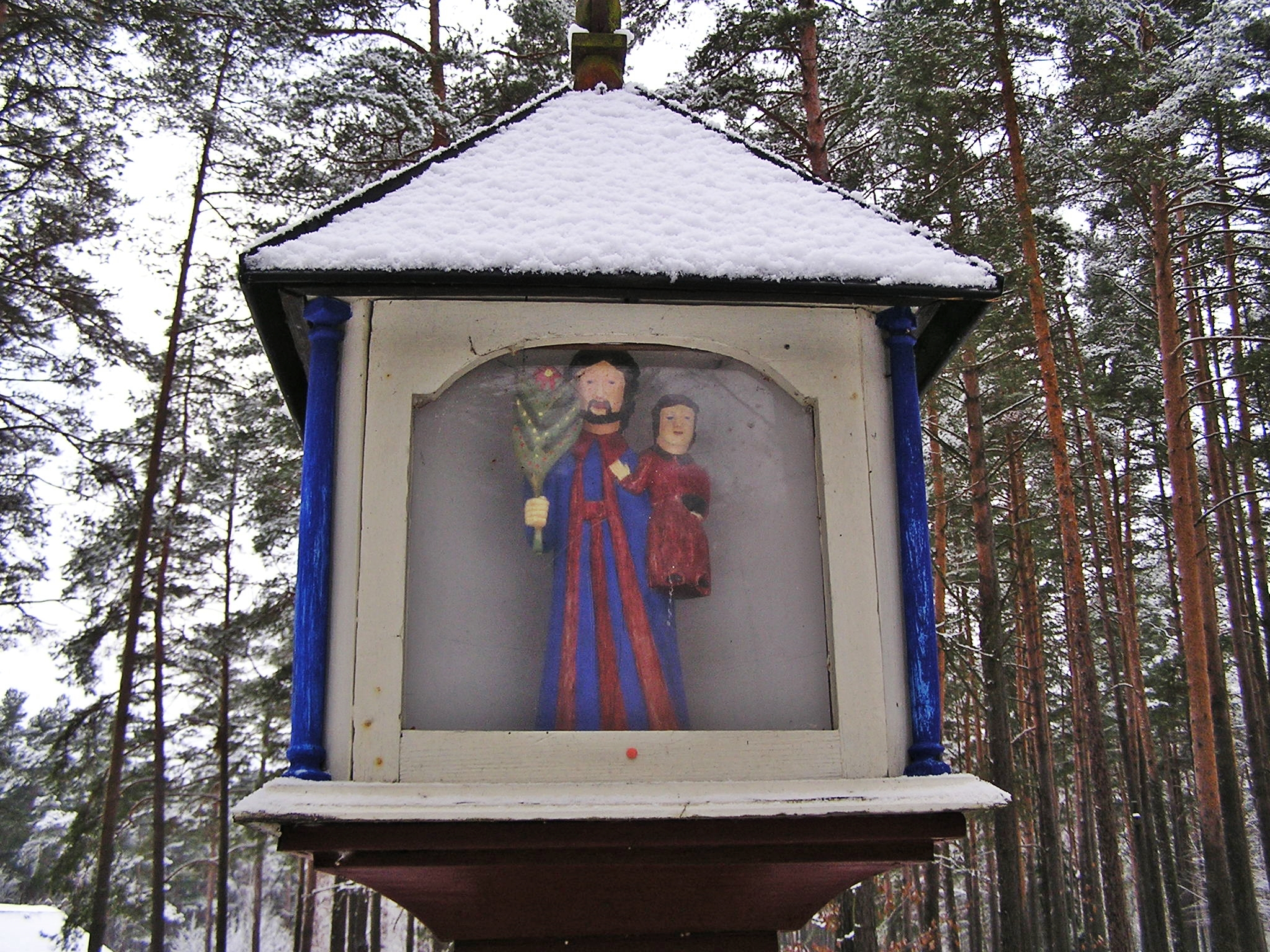
A 19th century Suiti column shrine with Saint Joseph from Alsunga, Latvia

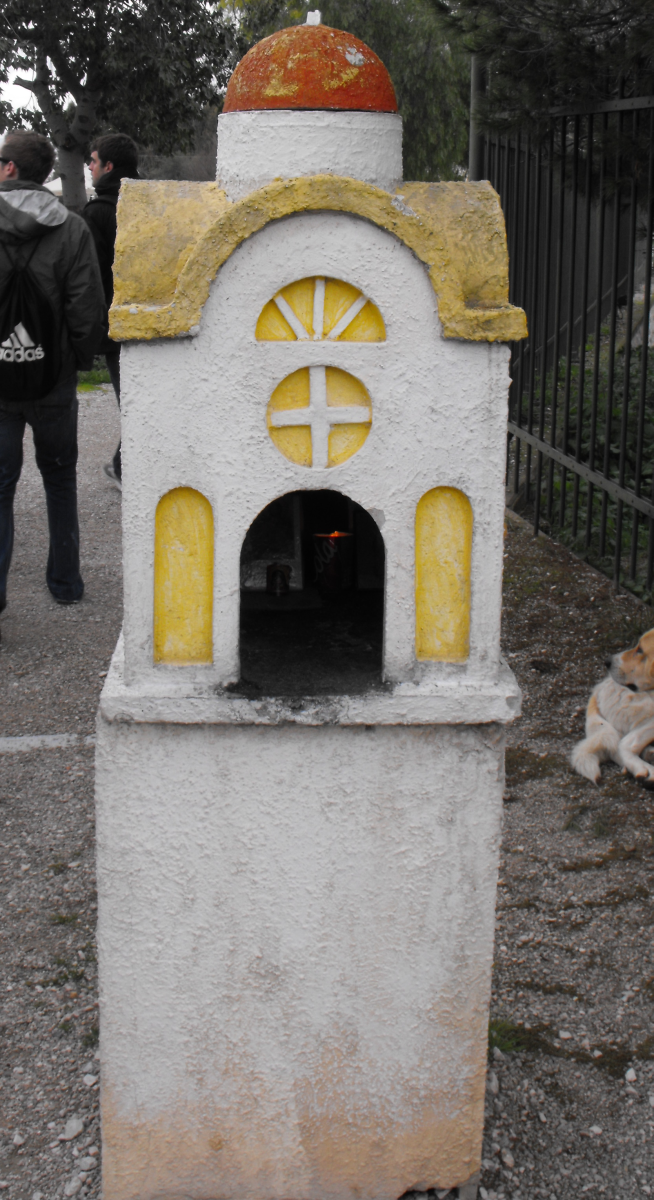
A typical, small roadside kandilakia. Athens, Greece

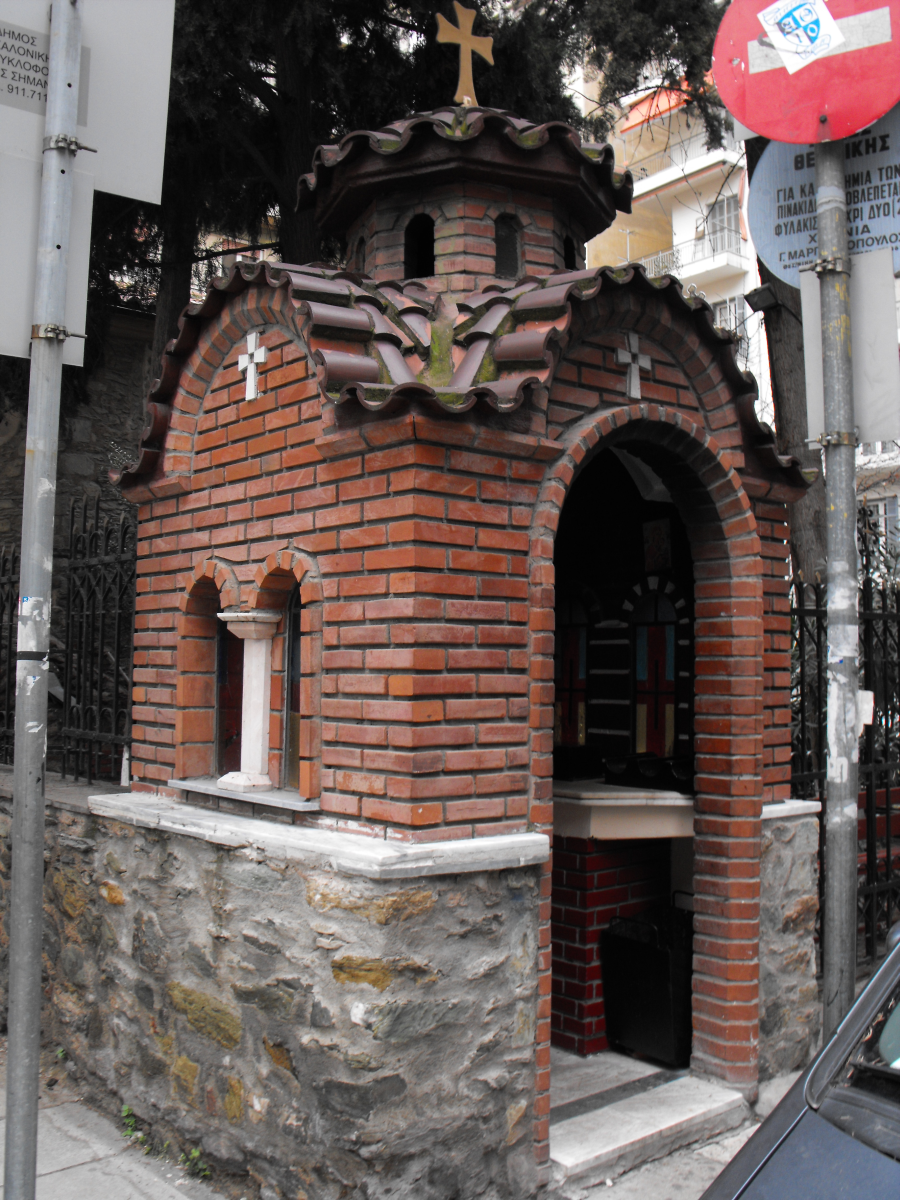
A larger kandilakia for a church in Thessaloniki, Greece

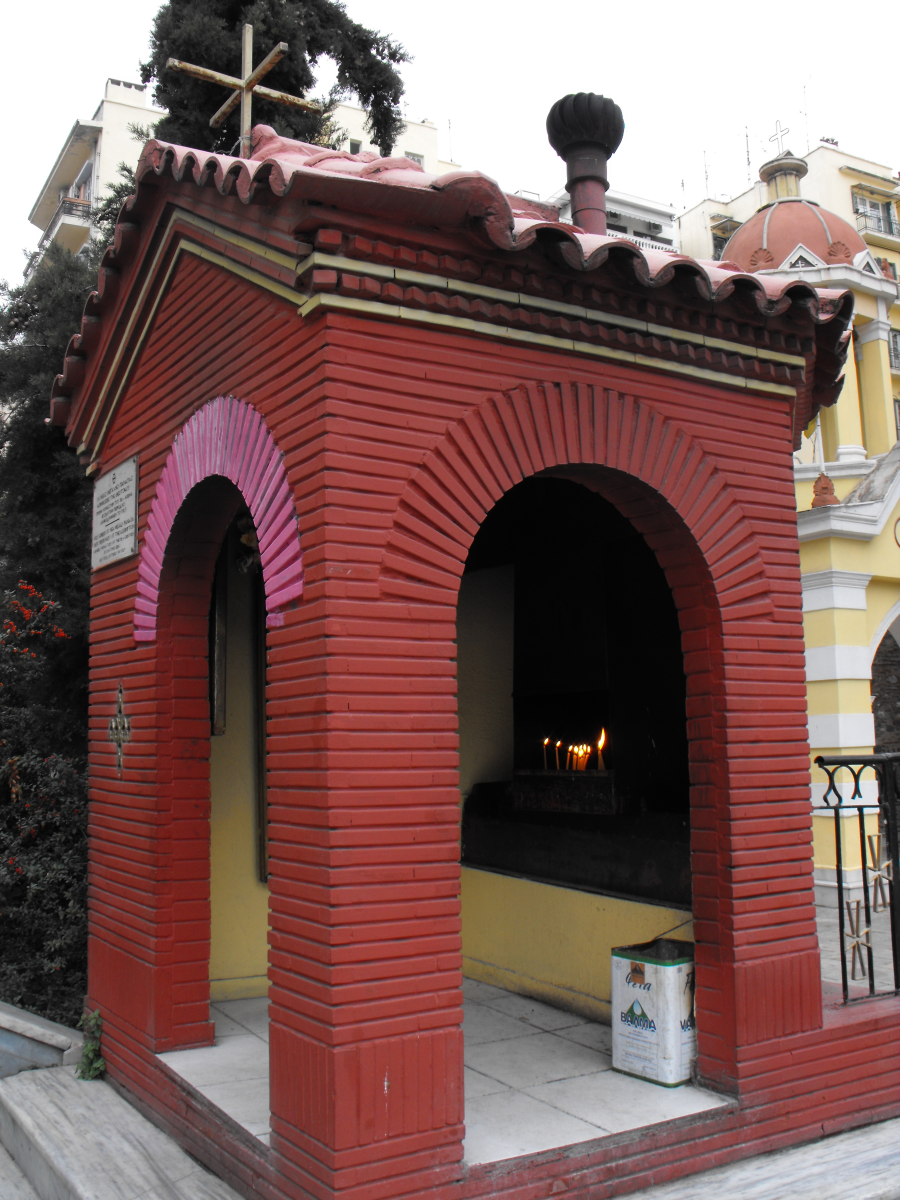
A large kandilakia for the Metropolitan Church in Thessaloniki, Greece

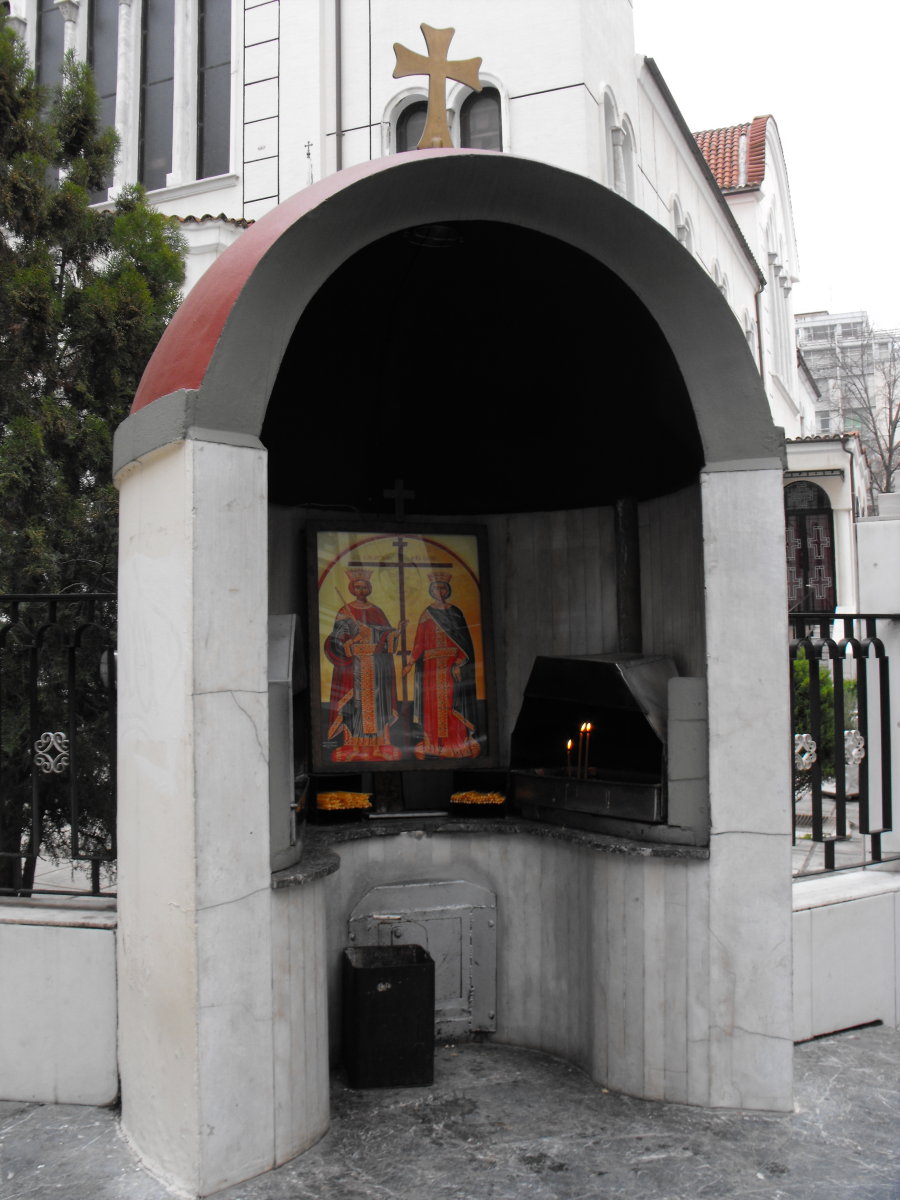
Kandilakia for Saints Constantine & Helen Church in Thessaloniki, Greece

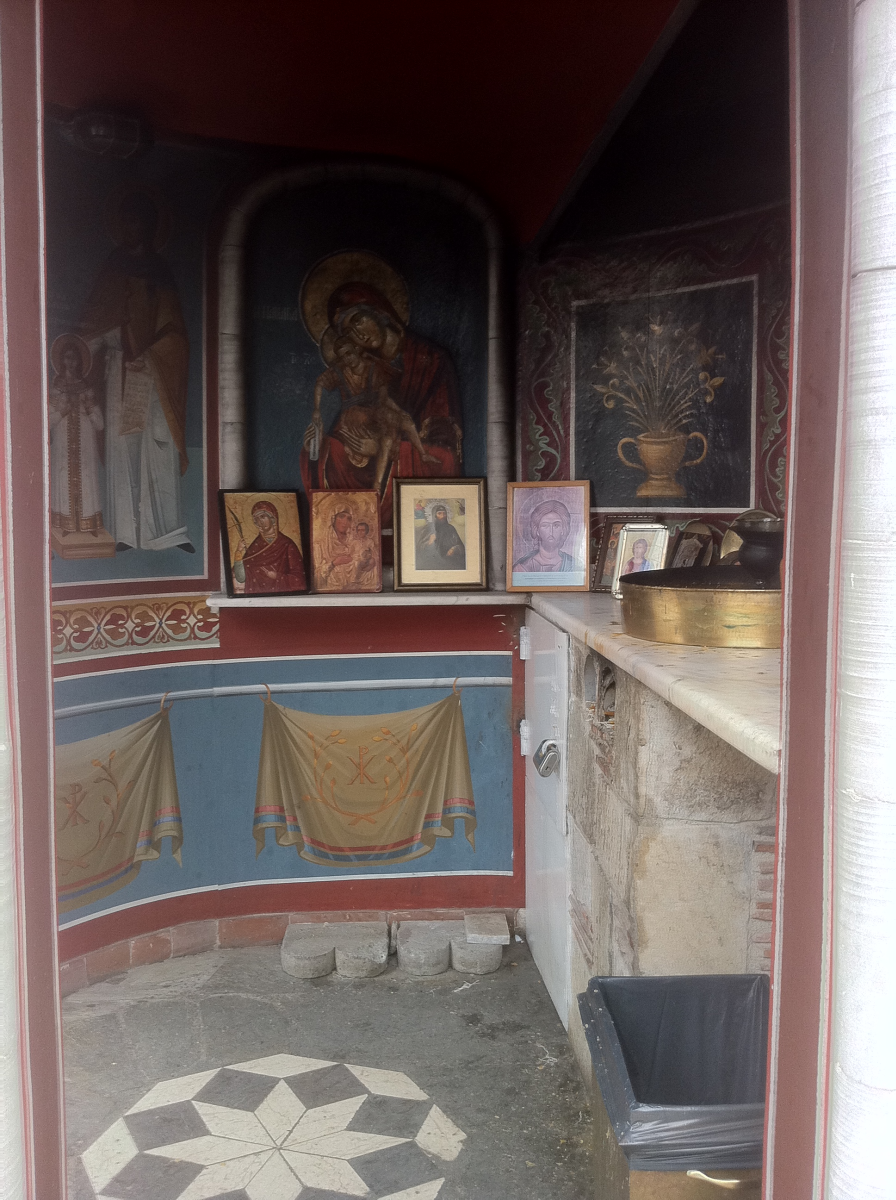
The interior of the kandilakia for Analipsi Church

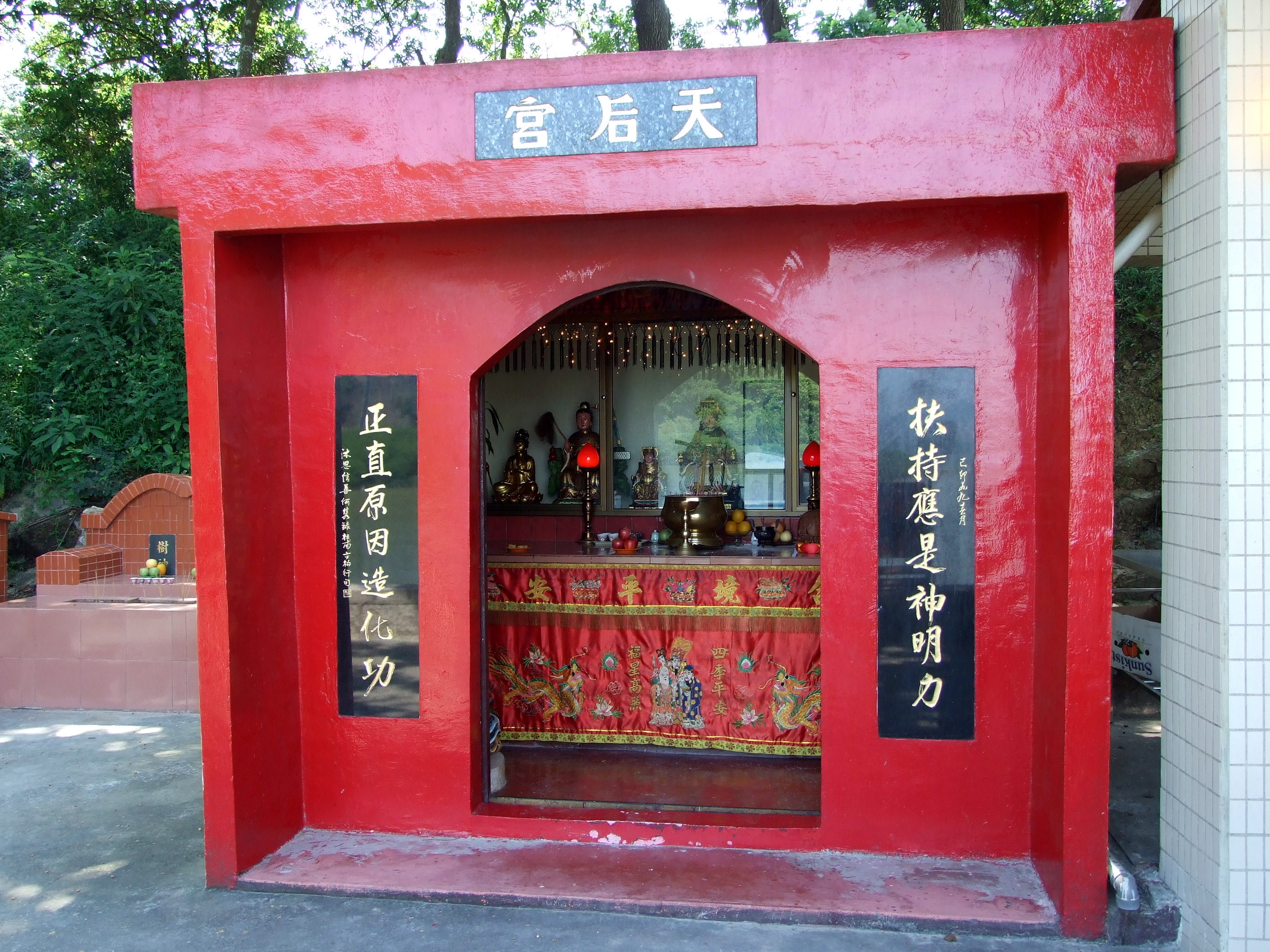
Shrine of Tin Hau in Nam Chung, Hong Kong

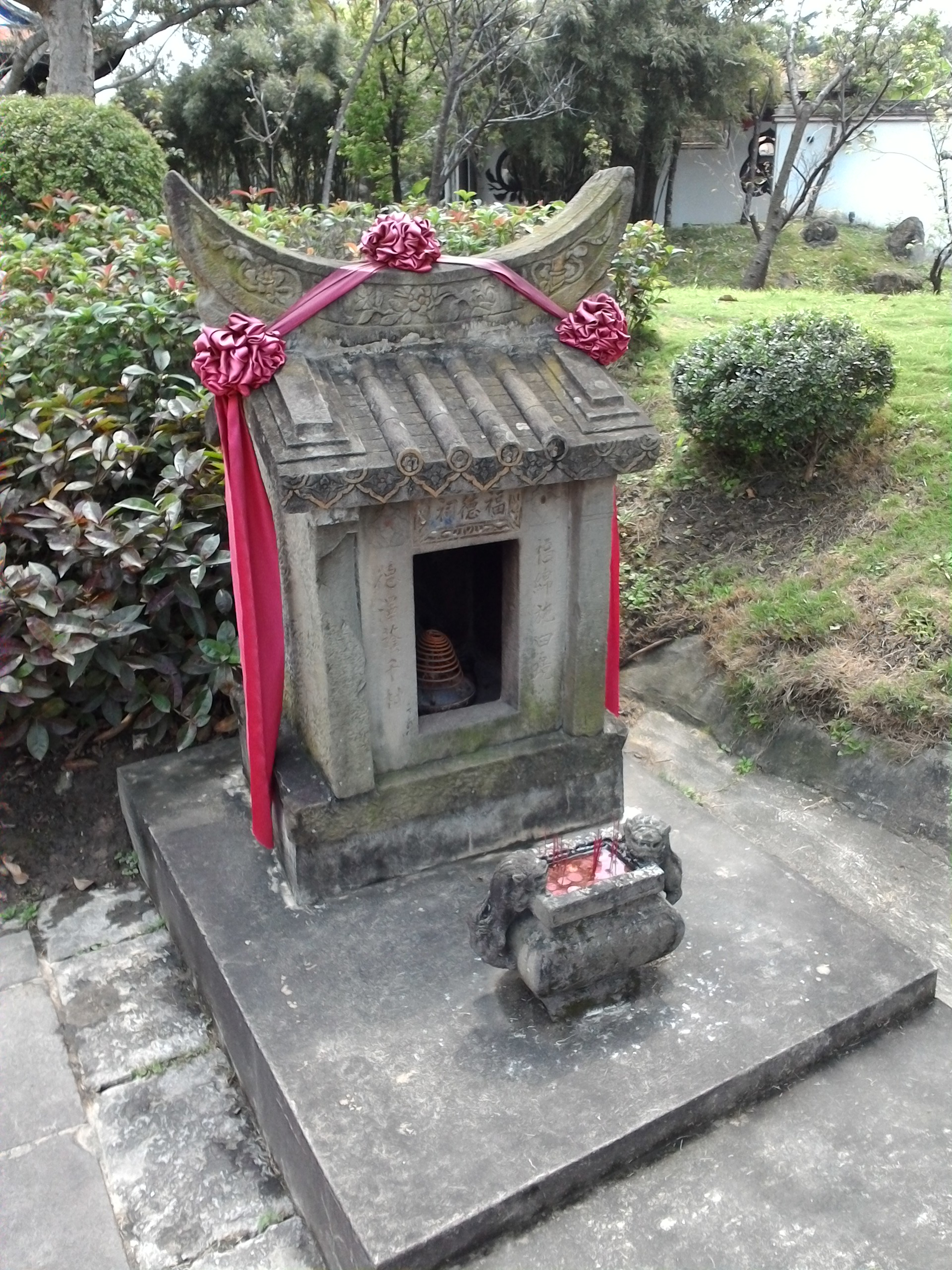
Shrine of Tu Di Gong, the Earth Deity in rural part of Taipei, Taiwan

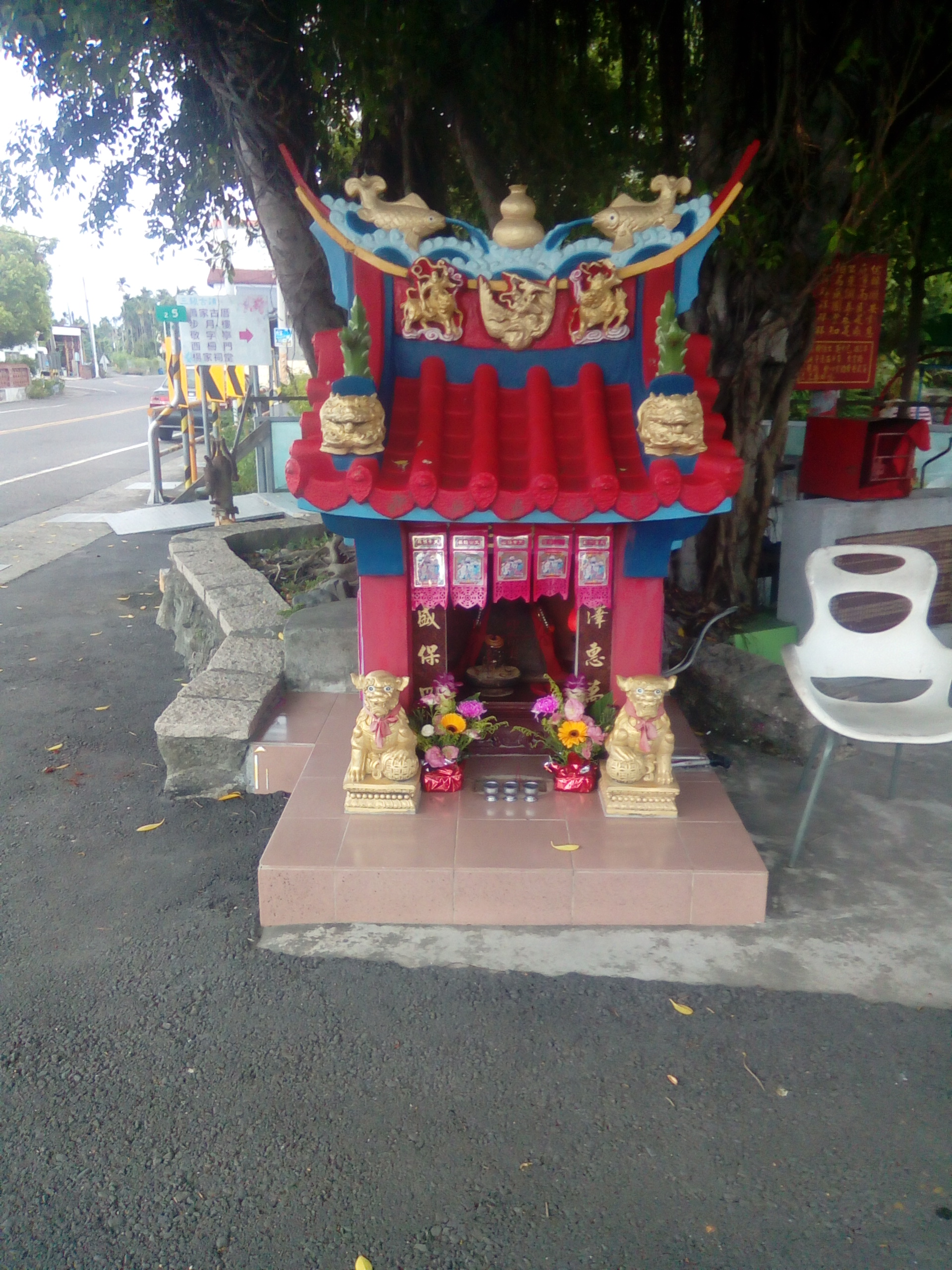
Shrine of Earth Deity in Pingtung County, Taiwan

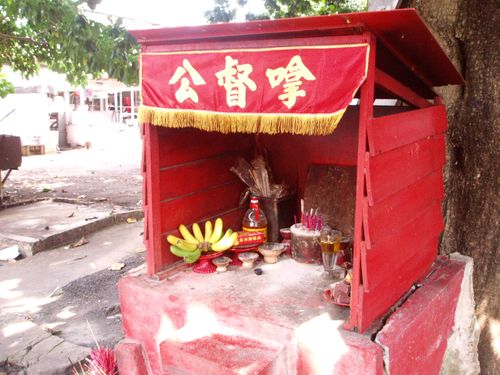
Shrine of Na Tuk Kong in Malaysia

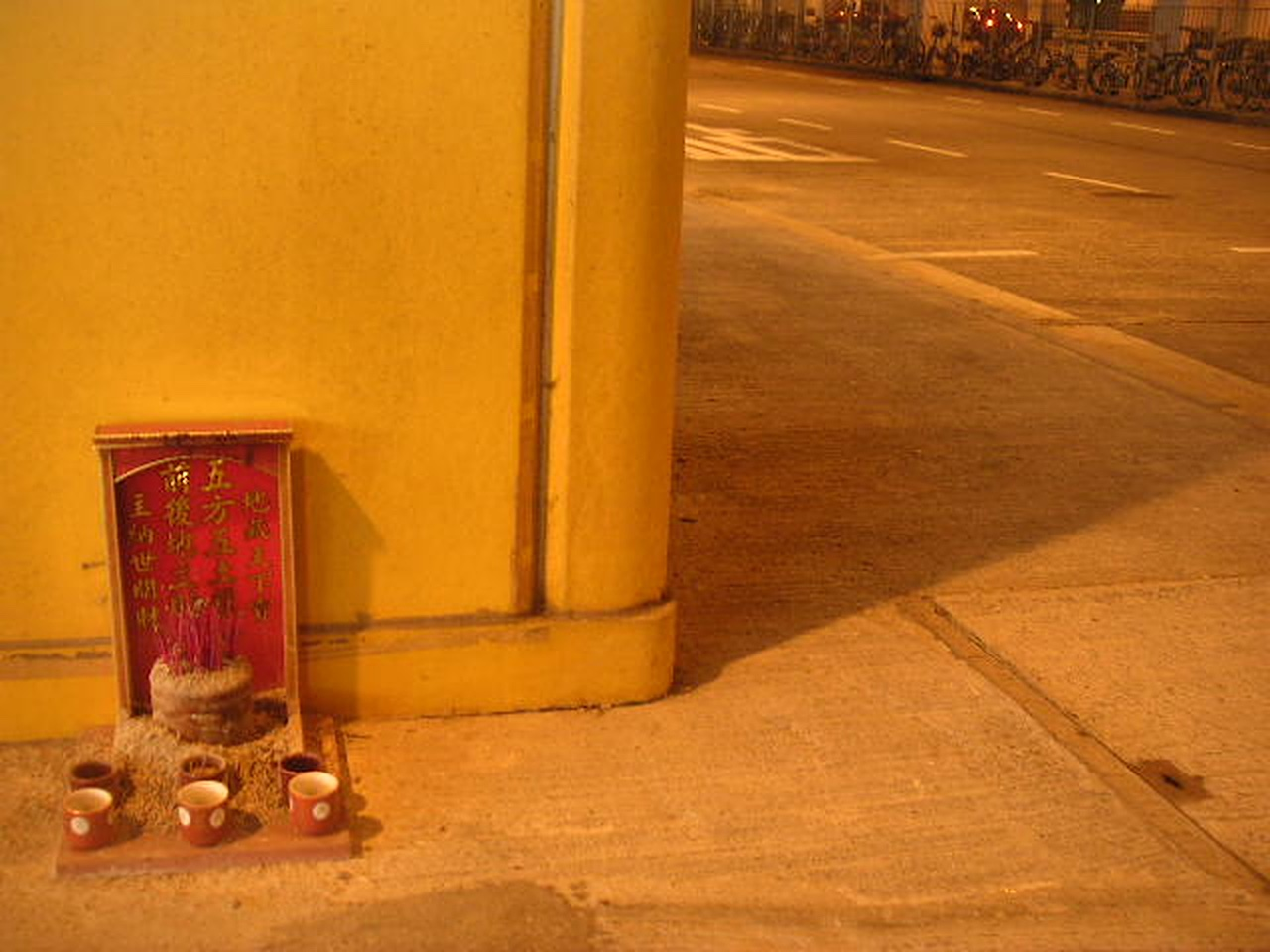
Simple small shrine in Hong Kong

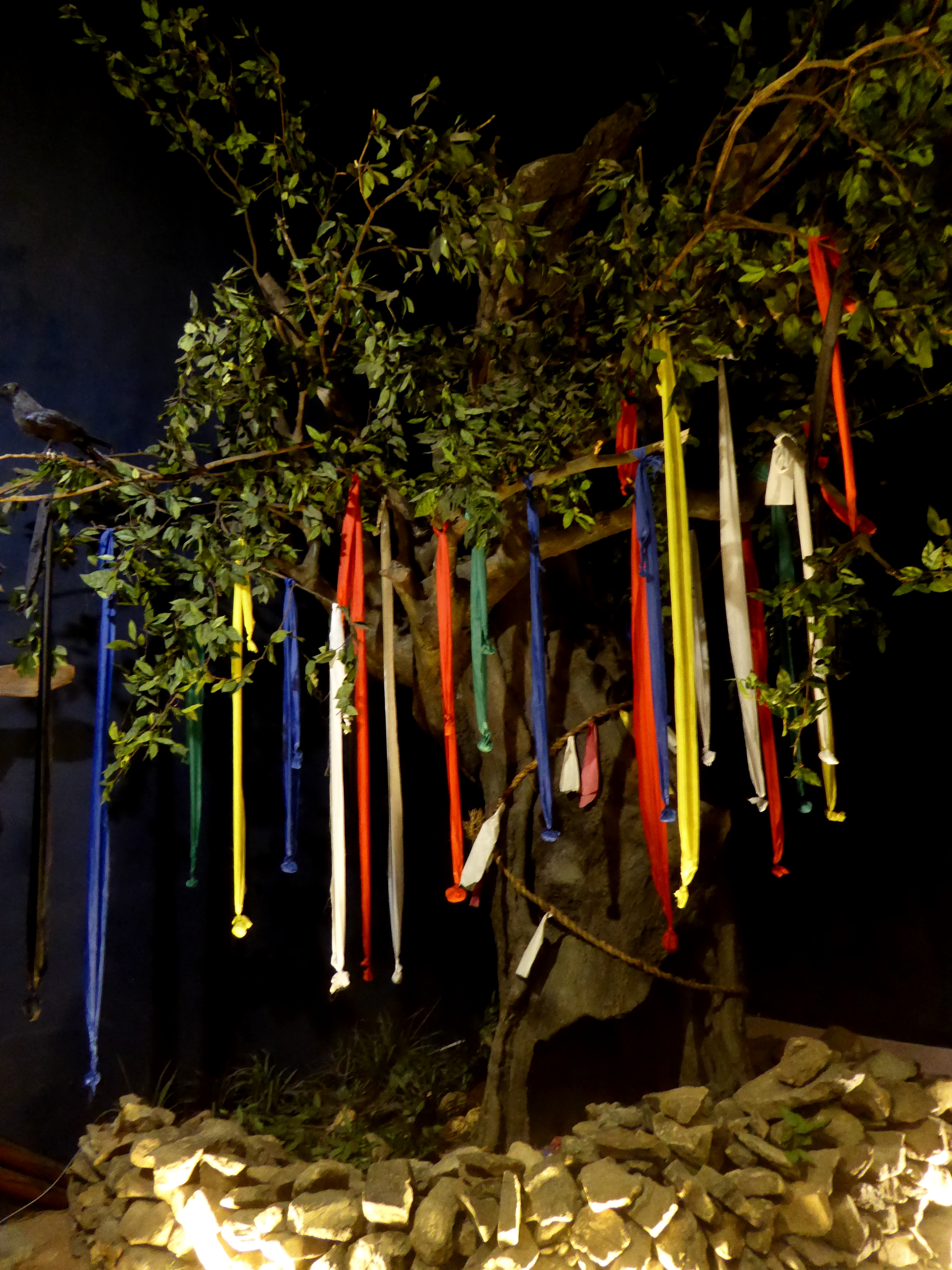
A recreated Seonangdang on display at the Lotte World Folk Museum in Seoul

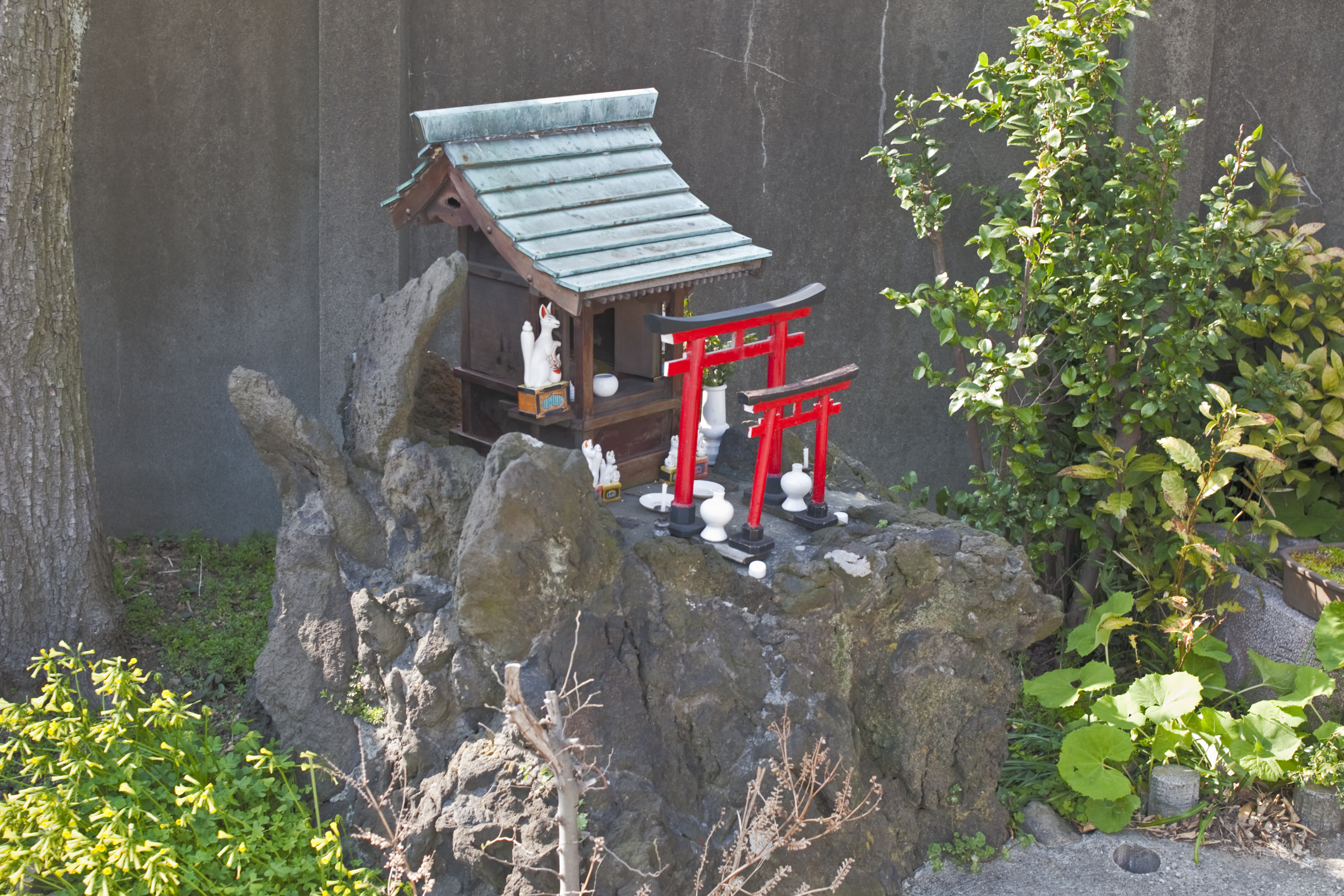
A shrine in Yokohama, Japan with an inari

== See also ==
- Bathtub Madonna
- Burmese pagoda
- Icon corner
- Minerva's Shrine, Chester
- Roadside memorial
- Roman temple of Alcántara
- Shigandang
