= Fischelbach =

- Stadtteil of Bad Laasphe
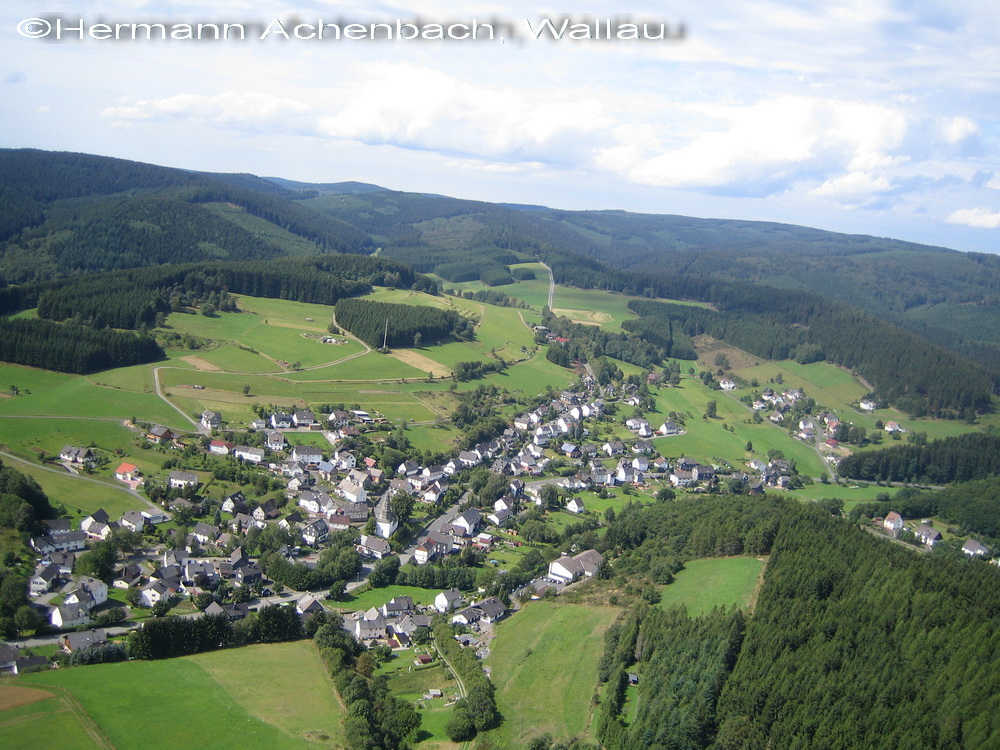

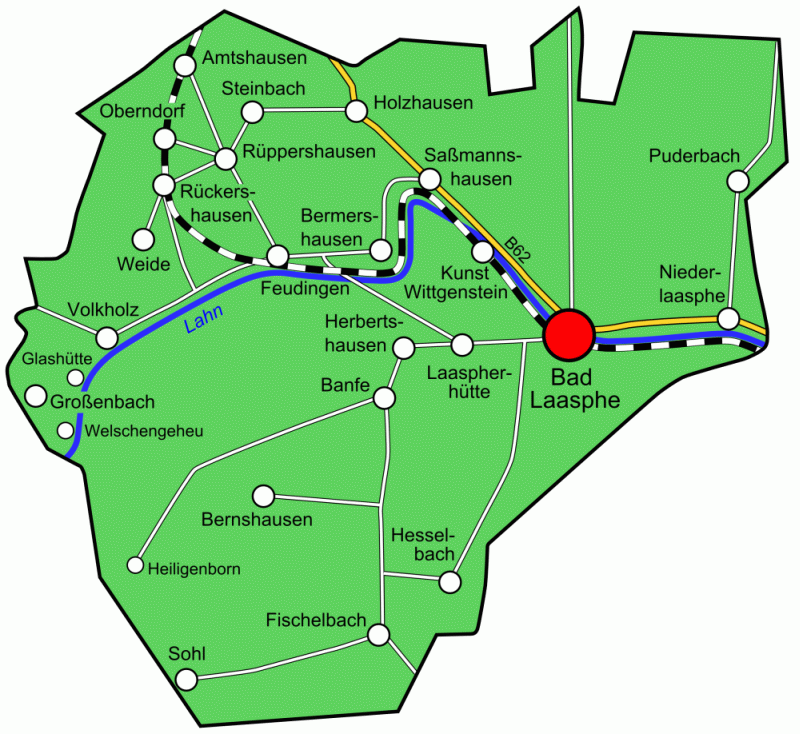
- Location of Fischelbach within Bad Laasphe
- Interactive map of Fischelbach
- Location within Germany Location within North Rhine-Westphalia
- Coordinates: 50°52′26″N 08°21′14″E
- Country: Germany
- State: North Rhine-Westphalia
- Admin. region: Arnsberg
- District: Siegen-Wittgenstein
- Town: Bad Laasphe

Area
  - Total: 11.93 km^{2} (4.61 sq mi)
- Elevation: 300–500 m (980–1,640 ft)

Population (2011)
  - Total: 630
  - Density: 53/km^{2} (140/sq mi)
- Time zone: UTC+01:00 (CET)
  - Summer (DST): UTC+02:00 (CEST)
- Postal codes: 57334
- Dialling codes: 02752

Fischelbach is a town subdivision of Bad Laasphe in the Siegen-Wittgenstein district in North Rhine-Westphalia, Germany with 630 inhabitants (2011).

== Geography ==
Fischelbach lies in the southern part of the modern Kreis (district) of Siegen-Wittgenstein, 8 km away of Bad Laasphe.
