= Bad Laasphe =

- Town
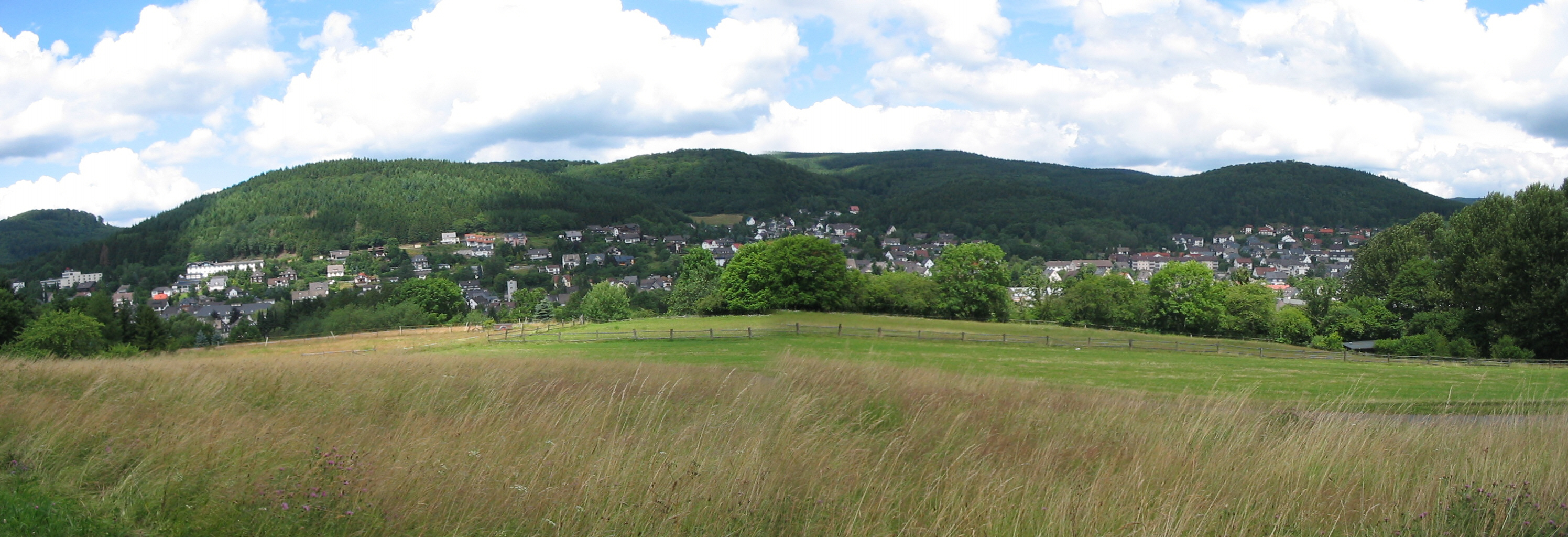

- Coat of arms

- Location of Bad Laasphe within Siegen-Wittgenstein district
- Interactive map of Bad Laasphe
- Location within Germany Location within North Rhine-Westphalia
- Coordinates: 50°55′49″N 08°25′00″E
- Country: Germany
- State: North Rhine-Westphalia
- Admin. region: Arnsberg
- District: Siegen-Wittgenstein
- Subdivisions: 24

Government
  - Mayor (2025–30): Dirk Terlinden

Area
  - Total: 135.95 km^{2} (52.49 sq mi)
- Elevation: 300–694 m (984–2,277 ft)

Population (2025-12-31)
  - Total: 12,967
  - Density: 95.381/km^{2} (247.03/sq mi)
- Time zone: UTC+01:00 (CET)
  - Summer (DST): UTC+02:00 (CEST)
- Postal codes: 57334
- Dialling codes: 02752, 02753, 02754, 02774
- Vehicle registration: SI
- Website: www.stadt-badlaasphe.de

Bad Laasphe (German: [baːt ˈlaːsfə]) is a town in North Rhine-Westphalia, Germany, in the Siegen-Wittgenstein district.

== Geography ==
=== Location ===
The town of Bad Laasphe lies in the upper Lahn Valley, near the stately home of Wittgenstein Castle (de) (nowadays a boarding school) in the former Wittgenstein district. The municipal area is located south of the main crest of the Rothaargebirge, and borders in the north on the towns of Bad Berleburg and Erndtebrück, in the east on the town of Biedenkopf in Hessen, in the southeast on Breidenbach, in the south on Dietzhölztal and in the west on the town of Netphen. Bad Laasphe lies about 30 km east of Siegen and 25 km northwest of Marburg.

The highest elevation in the municipal area rises to 694 m. It lies southwest of the main town at the outlying centre of Heiligenborn.

=== Constituent communities ===
Constituent communities

Each one of the following centres is part of the town of Bad Laasphe:

Amtshausen; Bad Laasphe (main town); Banfe; Bermershausen; Bernshausen; Feudingen; Fischelbach; Großenbach	Heiligenborn; Herbertshausen; Hesselbach; Holzhausen; Kunst Wittgenstein; Laaspherhütte; Niederlaasphe; Oberndorf	Puderbach; Rückershausen; Rüppershausen; Saßmannshausen; Sohl, Bad Laasphe; Steinbach; Volkholz; Weide

== History ==
In 1888, the town of Laasphe lay in the Prussian administrative region of Arnsberg in Wittgenstein district and was connected to the Kreuzthal-Marburg line of the Prussian State Railway (Preußische Staatsbahn). In 1888 Laasphe had a junior teachers' college, a local court and knitwear and hosiery factories. In 1885, Laasphe had 2225 mostly Evangelical inhabitants. Schloss Wittgenstein owned two ironworks. (From Meyers Konversations-Lexikon)

Since 1960, Laasphe has been a Kneipp spa. On 1 January 1984 the town became a Kneipp curative spa for its mild climate, and since then has been called Bad Laasphe.

== Population ==
Historical population

Year	Pop.	±% p.a.
1965	15,676	—
1970	15,687	+0.01%
1975	14,922	−0.99%
1980	14,662	−0.35%
1985	14,166	−0.69%
1990	15,139	+1.34%
1995	15,574	+0.57%

Year	Pop.	±% p.a.
2000	15,473	−0.13%
2005	15,073	−0.52%
2010	14,344	−0.99%
2015	14,276	−0.09%
2020	13,412	−1.24%
2025	12,967	−0.67%

Source: Landesdatabank Nordrhein-Westfalen

== Politics ==
The current mayor is Dirk Terlinden (Independent) who has been serving as mayor since 2020. In the 2025 runoff election he was reelected with 56,9 % of votes.

=== City council ===
After the 2025 local elections, the Bad Laasphe city council is composed as follows:

Party	Votes	%	+/-	Seats	+/-
Social Democratic Party (SPD)	2,389	33.4	▲1.3	8	▼2
Christian Democratic Union (CDU)	1,708	23.9	▼3.3	6	▼3
Free Democratic Party (FDP)	1,276	17.8	▼3.3	4	▼3
Alternative for Germany (AfD)	910	12.7	New	3	New
The PARTY (PARTEI)	580	8.1	▼1.7	2	▼1
Alliance 90/The Greens (Grüne)	296	4.1	▼5.4	1	▼2
Valid votes	7,159	98.9			
Invalid votes	81	1.1			
Total	7,240	100.0		24	▼8
Electorate/voter turnout	10,913	66.3			
Source: City of Bad Laasphe

== Coat of arms ==
Bad Laasphe's civic coat of arms might heraldically be described thus: In sable a town wall with open gate tower argent flanked by two crenellated towers argent, between which an inescutcheon in argent two pallets sable.

A stamping of the town's seal from the 14th century has been preserved, which shows the same composition as the arms shown here. The inescutcheon (smaller shield within the main one) bears the same arms as the town's former overlords, the Counts of Wittgenstein. When the arms were revised in 1908, the town came up with another composition which looked the same, but the inescutcheon, owing to a misunderstanding, was rather different, being quartered with two opposite quarters showing in gules (red) a castle argent (silver), and in the two other quarters the Wittgenstein pallets. The castle charge was a modern addition and related to the Wittgensteins' overlordship in Homburg. The town archive suggested even then that the inescutcheon bear the old Wittgenstein arms as seen in the town's oldest known seal, but no decision was made about it at that time. Only in 1936 did the town finally decide to revert to the composition shown in the old seal. This was confirmed as the town's arms on 10 March 1937.

== Twin towns ==
- Tamworth, Staffordshire, England, United Kingdom, since 10 October 1980
- Châteauneuf-sur-Loire, France, since 28 September 1991

== Notable people ==
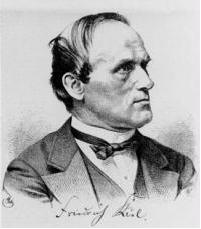
Friedrich Kiel

- Ludwig Crocius (1586–1655), preacher, professor at Bremen School Illustre
- Friedrich Kiel, (1821–1885), composer
- Wilhelm Pauck (1901–1981), Protestant church historian
- Rudolf Jung (1907–1973), writer and translator
- Fritz Heinrich, (1921–1959), German politician (SPD), Member of the Bundestag
- Otto Piene, (1928–2014), painter and artist
- Fritz Roth, born 1955, actor and musician
