= Banfe =

- Stadtteil of Bad Laasphe
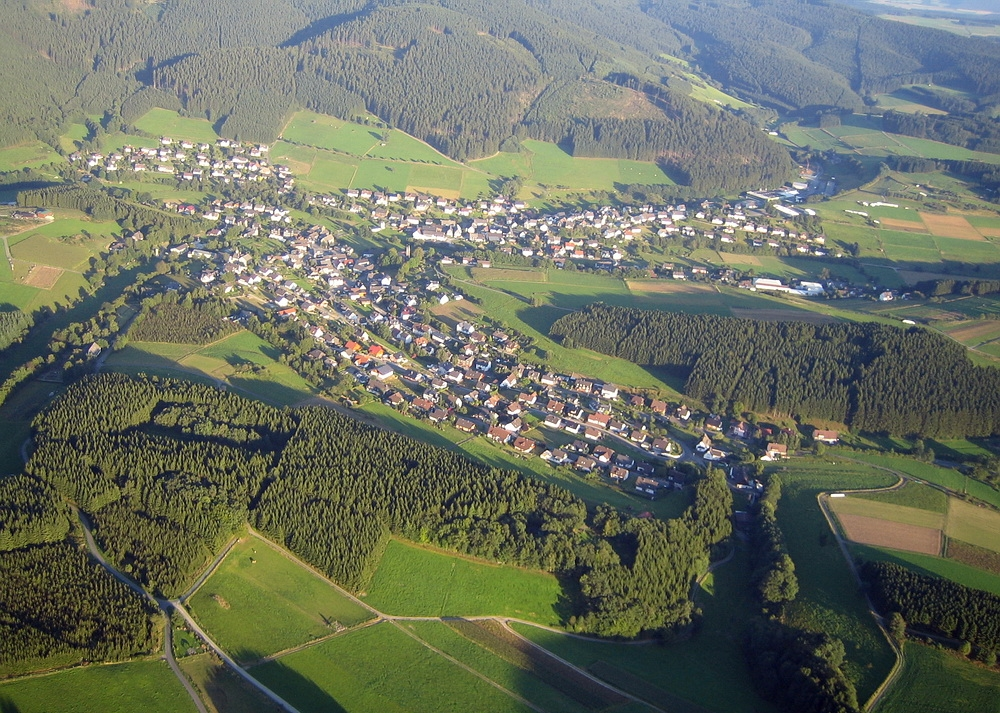

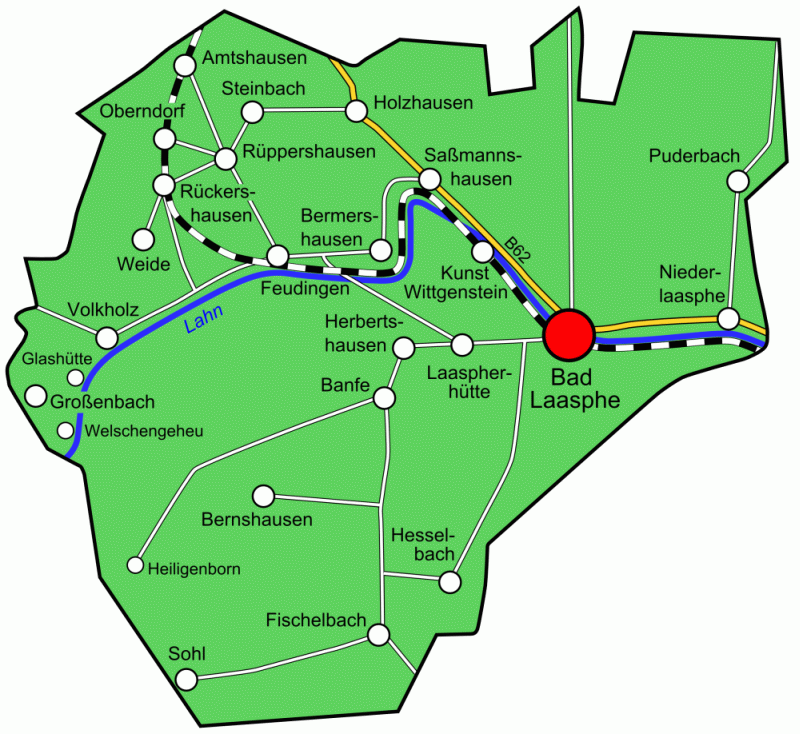
- Location of Banfe within Bad Laasphe
- Interactive map of Banfe
- Location within Germany Location within North Rhine-Westphalia
- Coordinates: 50°54′51″N 08°21′06″E
- Country: Germany
- State: North Rhine-Westphalia
- Admin. region: Arnsberg
- District: Siegen-Wittgenstein
- Town: Bad Laasphe

Area
  - Total: 15.32 km^{2} (5.92 sq mi)
- Elevation: 370 m (1,210 ft)

Population (2011)
  - Total: 1,320
  - Density: 86.2/km^{2} (223/sq mi)
- Time zone: UTC+01:00 (CET)
  - Summer (DST): UTC+02:00 (CEST)
- Postal codes: 57334
- Dialling codes: 02752

Banfe is a town subdivision of Bad Laasphe in the Siegen-Wittgenstein district in North Rhine-Westphalia, Germany, with 1500 inhabitants.

== Geography ==
Hesselbach lies in southern Wittgenstein, 3 km in the south-west of Bad Laasphe.
