= Hesselbach (Bad Laasphe) =

- Stadtteil of Bad Laasphe
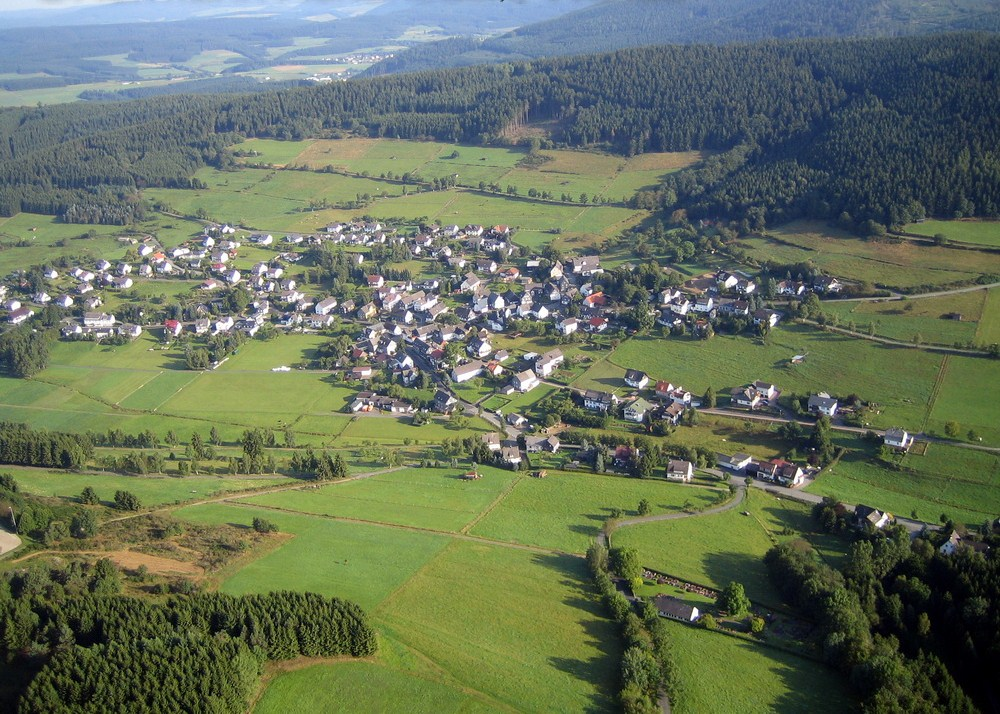
- Aerial view

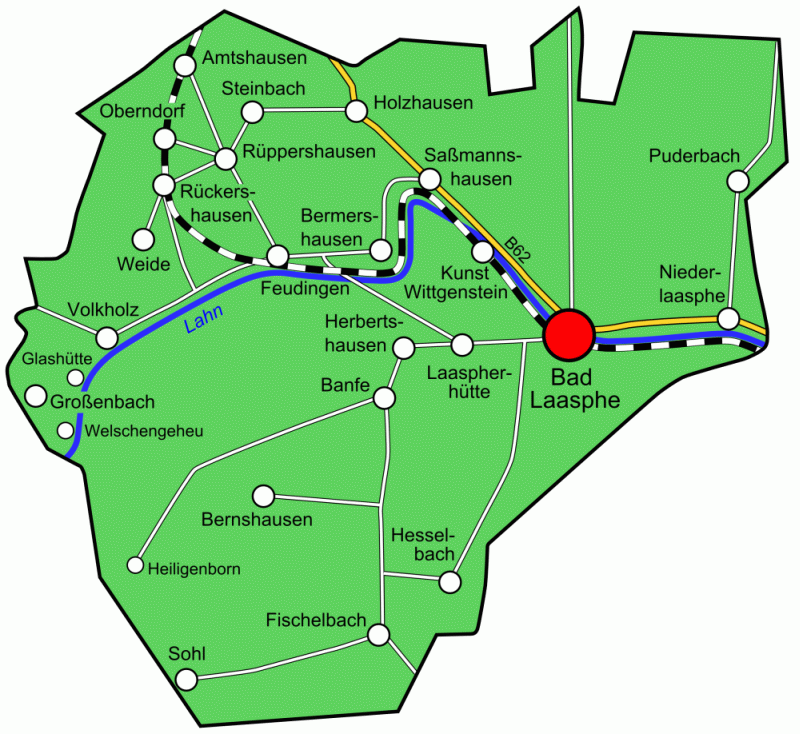
- Location of Hesselbach within Bad Laasphe
- Interactive map of Hesselbach
- Location within Germany Location within North Rhine-Westphalia
- Coordinates: 50°53′07″N 08°22′00″E
- Country: Germany
- State: North Rhine-Westphalia
- Admin. region: Arnsberg
- District: Siegen-Wittgenstein
- Town: Bad Laasphe

Area
  - Total: 8.83 km^{2} (3.41 sq mi)
- Elevation: 450–624 m (1,476–2,047 ft)

Population (2011)
  - Total: 530
  - Density: 60/km^{2} (160/sq mi)
- Time zone: UTC+01:00 (CET)
  - Summer (DST): UTC+02:00 (CEST)
- Postal codes: 57334
- Dialling codes: 02752

Hesselbach is a town subdivision of Bad Laasphe in the Siegen-Wittgenstein district in North Rhine-Westphalia, Germany with 600 inhabitants.

== Geography ==
Hesselbach lies in southern Wittgenstein, 6 km in the south-east of Bad Laasphe and 2 km away of the Hessian border.

== Literature ==
- Jürgen Tang (ed.): 1150 Jahre Hesselbach - Eine Chronik. Bad Laasphe-Hesselbach, 1987
- Eckhard Linke and Werner Schmidt (ed.): Heimatbuch Banfetal, Bad Laasphe-Banfe 1987
