= Wittgenstein (disambiguation) =

Ludwig Wittgenstein (Ludwig Josef Johann Wittgenstein, 1889 – 1951) was an Austrian-British philosopher.

Wittgenstein may also refer to:

- Wittgenstein (film), Derek Jarman's 1993 biopic of Ludwig Wittgenstein
- Wittgenstein family relatives of Ludwig
  - Palais Wittgenstein in Vienna, Austria, now demolished residence of the family
  - Haus Wittgenstein, residence of Margaret Stonborough-Wittgenstein in Vienna, Austria, partly designed by her brother Ludwig
- Wittgenstein or Wittgensteiner Land, a former Westphalian principality merged with Kreis Wittgenstein before being incorporated into Kreis Siegen-Wittgenstein, Germany
  - Wittgenstein Castle, near Bad Laasphe, Germany, seat of the principality of Wittgenstein
  - Sayn-Wittgenstein, a German noble family, formerly counts of Wittgenstein
- Wittgenstein, a fictional computer in The Brave Little Toaster to the Rescue and The Brave Little Toaster Goes to Mars
- Wittgenstein (비트겐슈타인), a South Korean rock band formed by Shin Hae-Chul, active from 2000 to 2001

== People with the surname ==
=== Viennese Wittgensteins ===
- Karl Wittgenstein (1847–1913), Austrian steel tycoon and father of Ludwig
- Margaret Stonborough-Wittgenstein (Margarethe Anna Maria, 1882–1958 ), sister of Ludwig
- Paul Wittgenstein (1887–1961), pianist and brother of Ludwig
- Paul Wittgenstein (grandson of his namesake, 1907–1979), eccentric and subject of Thomas Bernard's book Wittgenstein's Nephew (1982)

=== Sayn-Wittgensteins ===
- Widukind von Wittgenstein (died 1272), abbott of Grafschaft Abbey
- Louis I, Count of Sayn-Wittgenstein (1532–1605), German nobleman
- Prince Peter Wittgenstein (1769–1843), Russian field marshal
- Wilhelm Ludwig Sayn-Wittgenstein, Prussian politician
- Ludwig zu Sayn-Wittgenstein-Berleburg (1799–1866), Russian aristocrat
- Princess Carolyne zu Sayn-Wittgenstein (1819–1887), Russian noblewoman, Franz Liszt's mistress and patron
- Heinrich Prinz zu Sayn-Wittgenstein (1916–1944), World War II German flying ace
- Botho Prinz zu Sayn-Wittgenstein-Hohenstein (1927–2008), German politician
- Richard, 6th Prince of Sayn-Wittgenstein-Berleburg (1934–2017), German businessman
- Princess Nathalie of Sayn-Wittgenstein-Berleburg (born 1975), Danish equestrian
- August Wittgenstein (August-Frederik Prinz zu Sayn-Wittgenstein-Berleburg, born 1981), German-Swedish actor
