= Wittgenstein's Nephew =

Autobiographical work by Thomas Bernhard

Wittgenstein’s Nephew
- First edition (UK)
- Author: Thomas Bernhard
- Original title: Wittgensteins Neffe
- Translator: Ewald Osers (UK); David McLintock (US)
- Language: German
- Genre: Novel
- Publisher: Quartet Books (UK); Alfred A. Knopf (US)
- Publication date: 1982
- Publication place: Austria
- English publication date: 1986 (UK); 1989 (US)
- Media type: Print (Hardback & Paperback)
- Pages: 106 pp
- ISBN: 978-0-226-04392-0 (University of Chicago Press new edition 1990)
- OCLC: 20490247

Wittgenstein’s Nephew is an autobiographical work by Thomas Bernhard, originally published in 1982. It is a recollection of the author's friendship with Paul Wittgenstein, the nephew of Ludwig Wittgenstein and a member of the wealthy Viennese Wittgenstein family. Paul has an unnamed mental illness for which he is repeatedly hospitalized, paralleling Bernhard's own struggle with a chronic lung disease.

== Synopsis ==
The author narrates moments of his friendship with Paul Wittgenstein, "nephew" (actually son of a first cousin) of the Austrian philosopher Ludwig Wittgenstein (not to be confused with the latter's brother, the pianist Paul Wittgenstein). The title is a reference to Diderot's Rameau's Nephew who also deals with the eccentric nephew of a preeminent cultural figure. A very sensitive man, unsuitable for the world, obsessed by an exclusive and cruel passion for music as well as for race cars and sailing, Paul Wittgenstein dissipated his whole fortune and ultimately died poor.

Their friendship was disrupted whilst both recovered in a hospital - Bernhard from a lung ailment and Paul from a bout of madness - as, despite residing in wards located merely two-hundred meters from each other, each man proved reluctant to visit the other. The latter will die alone in an asylum, a victim of an incurable conflict with the world; whereas the former will succeed in controlling his own madness, emblem of that very conflict, and making it a lever for his sense of social living.

The work offers a critical portrayal of Viennese cultural life, including its coffeehouse culture and literary institutions. Literary scholar Francis Michael Sharp notes that the narrator criticizes Vienna's coffeehouse culture, while critic John Updike discusses Bernhard's satirical treatment of literary prize ceremonies and the institutions that award them.

The author gives advice about the importance of literary prizes as the determining factor of artistic worth: "a prize is invariably only awarded by incompetent people who want to piss on your head and who do copiously piss on your head if you accept their prize."
