= Wittgenstein family =

German-Austrian family

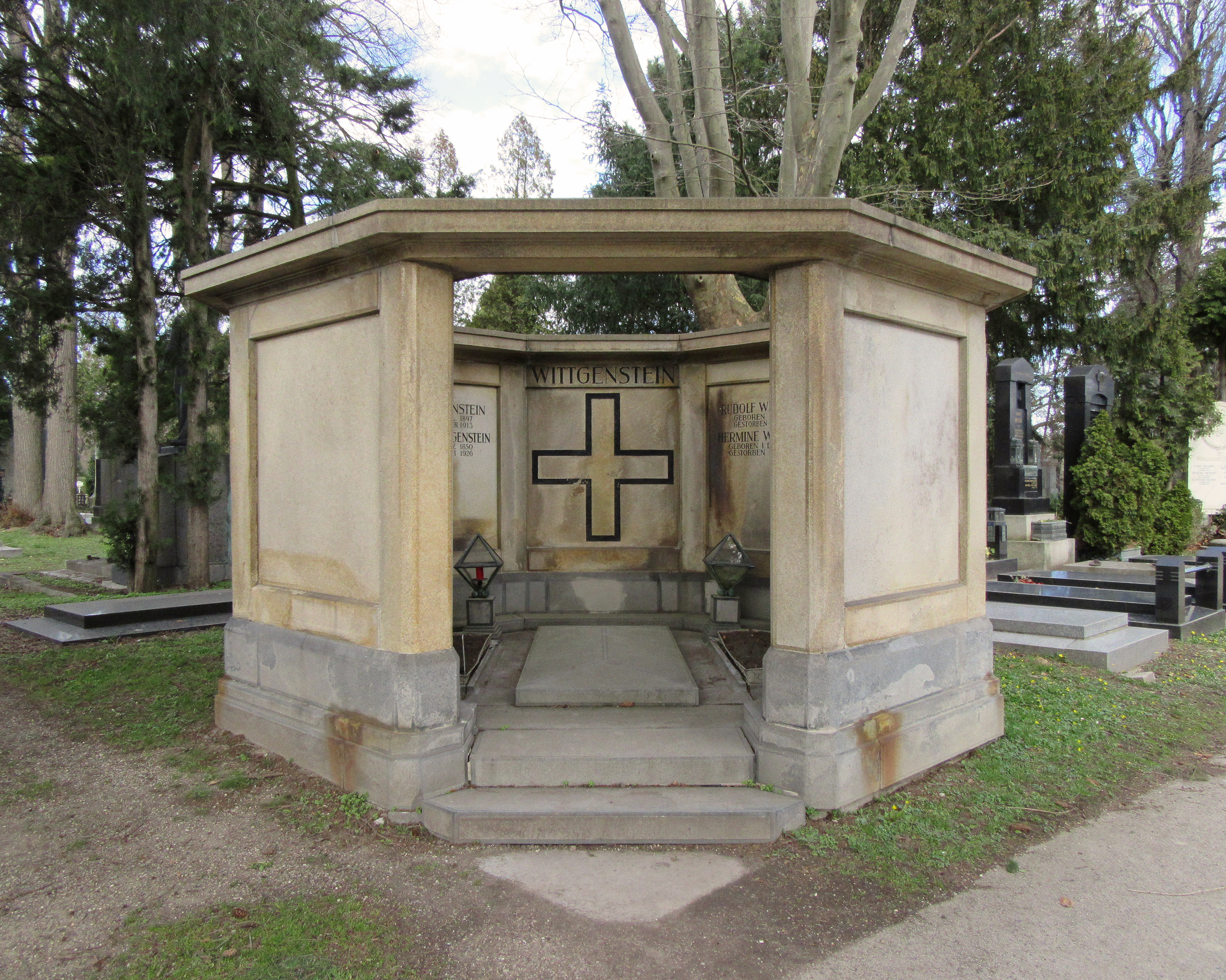
The Wittgenstein family grave in Vienna Central Cemetery

The Wittgenstein family is a German-Austrian family that rose to prominence in 19th- and 20th-century Vienna, Austria. The family was originally Jewish and originated from the Wittgensteiner Land in Siegen-Wittgenstein, Germany.

The Austrian branch of the Wittgenstein family began with the emigration of Hermann Christian Wittgenstein to Vienna in 1851. By 1910, 26 members of the Wittgenstein family were among the 929 wealthiest people in Vienna.

Members of the Wittgenstein family include successful merchants, entrepreneurs, industrialists, lawyers, musicians, patrons of the arts and philosophers:

- Karl Wittgenstein (1847–1913), steel magnate
- Margaret Stonborough-Wittgenstein (1882–1958), philanthropist
- Paul Wittgenstein (1887–1961), concert pianist
- Ludwig Wittgenstein (1889–1951), philosopher

== History ==
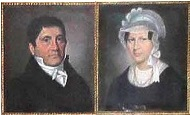
Moses and Breindel Meyer-Wittgenstein, Korbach, 1810

The earliest known family members are the estate manager Ahron Moses Meier (died 1804) and his wife Sarah. They lived in Laasphe in the Wittgensteiner Land and worked for the Counts of Sayn-Wittgenstein-Hohenstein.

Their son, Moses Meyer, was initially the estate manager of the Counts. In 1806, after the Reichsdeputationshauptschluss, the Wittgensteiner Land fell to Hessen-Darmstadt. In 1808, Napoleon initiated the Jewish emancipation and Jews were required to adopt a fixed surname within three months. Moses chose the name Meyer-Wittgenstein. This led to a conflict with the Prussian Wilhelm zu Sayn-Wittgenstein-Hohenstein, who had been elevated to Reichsfürst in 1804. Moses left the Wittgensteiner Land with his family and moved to the nearby Principality of Waldeck. It was there that he created a successful business as a wool trader in the former Hanseatic City Korbach, an area with many sheep.

== Selected members ==
1. Moses Meyer-Wittgenstein (born 1761 in Laasphe; died 3 January 1822 in Korbach), married Bernhardine (Breindel) Simon (1768–1829)
  1. Simson Moses Wittgenstein (8 December 1788 – 22 March 1853), married on 4 October 1813 in Rheda to Rebecca Rosenberg (born 2 May 1783; died 15 April 1854 in Korbach)
    1. Friedrike Wittgenstein (born c. 1820), married on 6 August 1850 to Isaac Koppel (born c. 1815)
    2. Marcus Wittgenstein (born c. 1818 in Korbach; died 1828 in Korbach)
    3. Jakob Wittgenstein (born 1 April 1819 in Korbach; died 3 June 1890 in Berlin by suicide), married Clara Lippert (divorced on 22 May 1871 from the Stadtgericht Berlin), estate manager in Berlin from 1858, founder of "Simson and Rebecca Wittgenstein Stiftung" (1884) and the "Jacob Wittgenstein`sche Altersversorgungsanstalt" (1894)
  2. Julia Wittgenstein (born 1790 in Korbach), married Rosenberg
  3. Richard Simon Wittgenstein (born 1796; died 13 February 1862), married Ida (born 1809 in Bielefeld; died 3 July 1880 in Geibsdorf)
    1. Louise Johanne Henriette Wittgenstein (born 1831), married Heinrich Hirsch (born 5 May 1840)
    2. Emma Flora Caroline Wittgenstein (1833–1879)
    3. Max Adolf Georg Carl Wittgenstein (born 1836)
    4. Ernst Oscar Wittgenstein (born 1844), married Emma Vaerst
  4. Hermann Christian Wittgenstein (born 15 September 1802 in Korbach; died 19 May 1878 in Vienna-Hietzing), wool trader in Gohlis and estate manager in Vienna, converted to Protestantism in 1839, married Franziska (Fanny) Figdor (born 7 April 1814 in Kittsee; died 21 October 1890 in Vienna-Hietzing)
    1. Anna Friederike Wittgenstein (born 31 October 1840 in Gohlis; died 22 September 1896 in Hietzing), married Heinrich "Emil" Franz (born 9 December 1839 in Vienna; died 24 March 1884 in Vienna)
    2. Marie Wittgenstein (1841–1931), married Moritz Christian Pott (1839–1902; iron merchant)
    3. Paul Josef Gustav Wittgenstein (1842–1928), jurist, married Justine Karoline Hochstetter (1858–1918)
      1. Johanna Salzer (née Wittgenstein) (1877–1953)
      2. Hermann Christian Wittgenstein (1879–1953)
      3. Paul Karl Wittgenstein (1880–1948)
        1. Paul Wittgenstein (1907–1979), philosopher
    4. Josephine Wittgenstein (1844–1933), married Johann Nepomuk Oser (1833–1912)
    5. Ludwig "Louis" Wittgenstein (1845–1925), owner of Schloss Hollenburg, married Maria Franz (1850–1912)
    6. Karl Otto Clemens Wittgenstein (born 1847 in Vienna; died 1913)
      1. Hermine Wittgenstein (born 1874 in Teplitz; died 1950)
      2. Dora Wittgenstein (born 1876 in Vienna; died at birth)
      3. Hans Wittgenstein (born 1877 in Vienna; died 1902 in the Chesapeake Bay, presumed suicide by drowning)
      4. Kurt Wittgenstein (born 1878 in Vienna; died November 1918, shot himself on the Italian front)
      5. Helene Wittgenstein (born 1879 in Vienna; died 1956) married Max Salzer (ministry official)
        1. Felix Salzer (1904–1986), leading music theorist and music educator
      6. Rudolf Wittgenstein (born 1881 in Vienna; died 1904 in Berlin by suicide) chemistry student
      7. Margaret Stonborough-Wittgenstein (1882–1958), married Jerome Stonborough in 1904. Builder of the Haus Wittgenstein (of which her brother Ludwig was the architect) and longtime owner of the Villa Toscana. Painted by Gustav Klimt.
      8. Paul Wittgenstein (1887–1961), concert pianist, married Hilde Schania (1915–2001)
        1. Paul-Louis Wittgenstein (born 1941)
        2. Elisabeth
        3. Johanna
      9. Ludwig Wittgenstein (1889–1951), philosopher
    7. Ottilie Ida Bertha Wittgenstein (1848–1908) landowner, cheese producer and patron of the arts in Pyhra, married Karl Kupelwieser (1841–1925)
      1. Paula Franziska Johanna Kupelwieser (1875–1938), married Mathes
      2. Ida Josepha Johanna Kupelwieser (1870–1927), married Lenz
      3. Ernst Hermann Leopold Kupelwieser (1873–1892)
      4. Johann Paul Kupelwieser (1879–1939), medical doctor
    8. Klara Wittgenstein (1850–1935)
    9. Lydia Wittgenstein (1851–1920), married von Siebert
    10. Emilie Wittgenstein (1853–1939), married Theodor von Brücke (1853–1918; judge)
    11. Klothilde Wittgenstein (1854–1937)
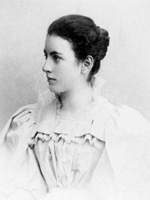
Margaret Stonborough-Wittgenstein, c. 1920

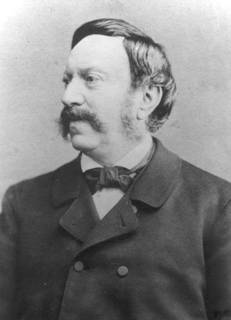
Jakob Wittgenstein, Berlin, 1850

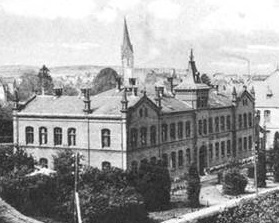
Jakob Wittgensteinsche Altersversorgungsanstalt, Enser Straße 10, Korbach, 1912

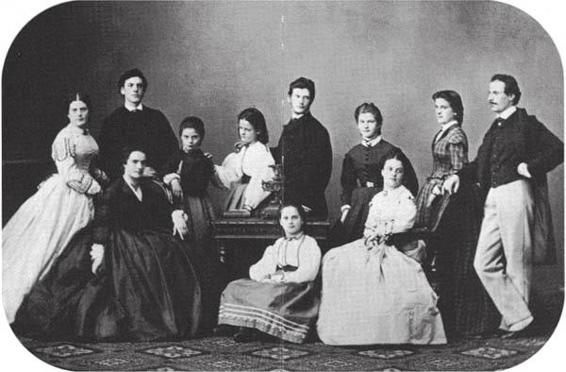
The eleven children of Hermann and Fanny Wittgenstein, Vienna, 1860

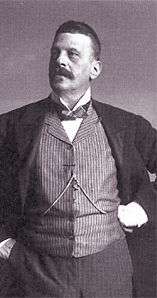
Karl Wittgenstein, Vienna, 1908

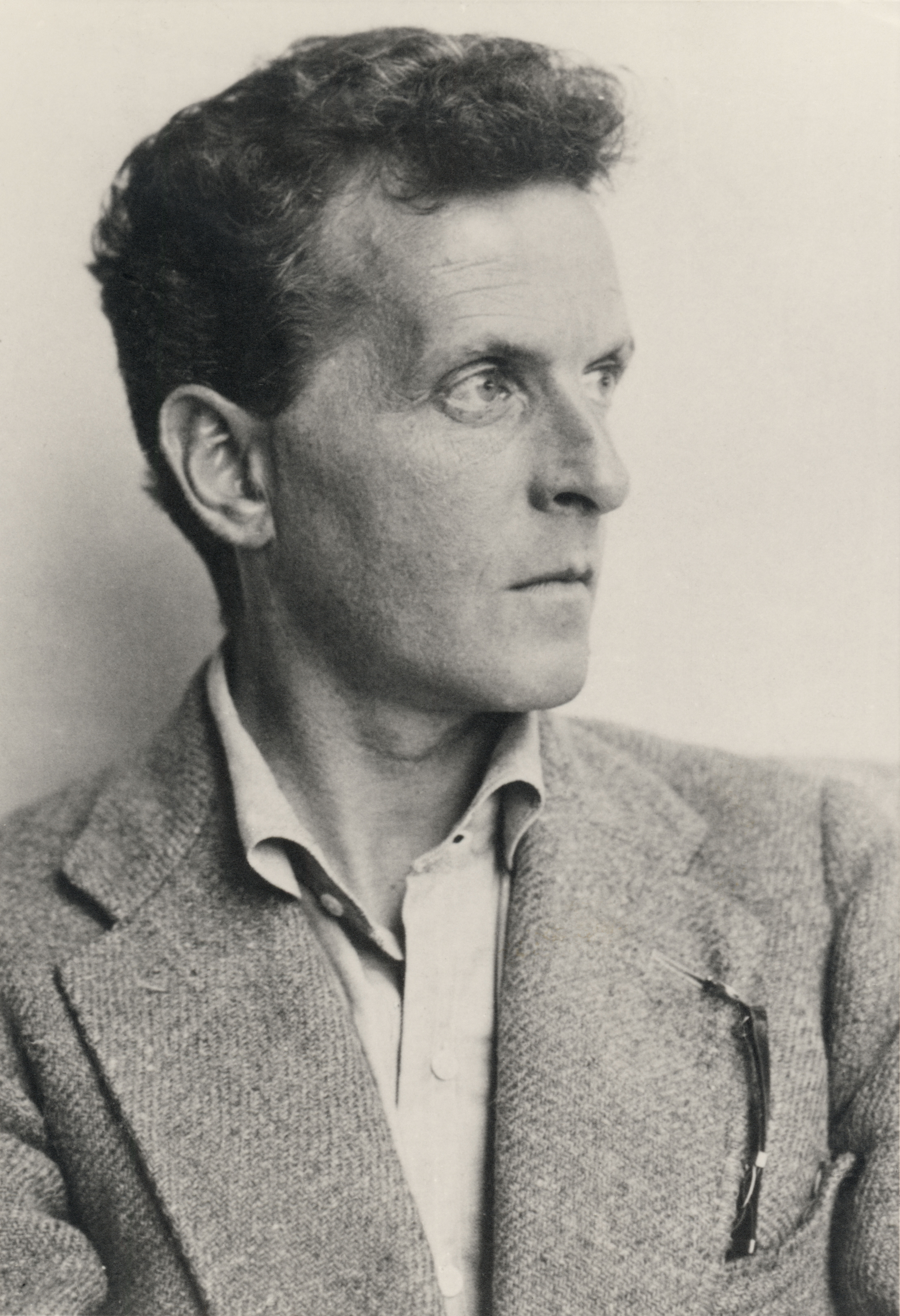
Ludwig Wittgenstein, 1930

== General and cited references ==
- Gaugusch, Georg (2001). "Die Familien Wittgenstein und Salzer und ihr genealogisches Umfeld". Adler, Zeitschrift für Genealogie und Heraldik. (in German). Vol. 21. pp. 120–145.
- Immler, Nicole Leandra (2011). Das Familiengedächtnis der Wittgensteins. Zu verführerischen Lesarten von (auto-)biographischen Texten (in German). Bielefeld: Transcript Verlag. ISBN 9783837618136. OCLC 742964331.
- Prokop, Ursula (2003). Margaret Stonborough-Wittgenstein. Bauherrin, Intellektuelle, Mäzenin (in German). Vienna; Cologne; Weimar: Böhlau Verlag.
- Sandgruber, Roman (2013). Traumzeit für Millionäre. Die 929 reichsten Wienerinnen und Wiener im Jahr 1910 (in German). Graz: Styria Premium. ISBN 978-3-222-13405-0.
- Schwaner, Birgit (2008). Die Wittgensteins. Kunst und Kalkül (in German). Vienna: Metro Verlag.
- Singer, Lea (2008). Konzert für die linke Hand (in German). Hamburg: Hoffmann und Campe.
- Waugh, Alexander (2009). Das Haus Wittgenstein. Geschichte einer ungewöhnlichen Familie. Frankfurt am Main: S. Fischer Verlag.
- Waugh, Alexander (2009). The House of Wittgenstein: A Family at War. New York: Doubleday. ISBN 978-0-307-27872-2, OL 24088914M.
- Wittgenstein, Hermine (2015). Somavilla, Ilse (ed.). Familienerinnerungen (in German). Innsbruck; Vienna: Haymon Verlag. ISBN 978-3-7099-7200-7.
  - "Ziemlich harte und scharfhäutige Brocken". Frankfurter Allgemeine Zeitung (in German). 2 February 2016. p. 10.
