= Haidbauer incident =

Physical assault of a child by Ludwig Wittgenstein

- Wittgenstein (front, seventh right) with his pupils, taken in Puchberg am Schneeberg, spring 1923
- Date: April 1926
- Location: Otterthal, Austria
- Participants: Ludwig Wittgenstein (1889–1951); Josef Haidbauer (c. 1915–c. 1929)
- Inquiries: Proceedings began at the district court in Gloggnitz on 17 May 1926; outcome unknown

The Haidbauer incident, known in Austria as der Vorfall Haidbauer, took place in April 1926 when Josef Haidbauer, an 11-year-old schoolboy in Otterthal, Austria, reportedly collapsed unconscious after being hit on the head during a class by the Austrian philosopher Ludwig Wittgenstein.

Wittgenstein taught philosophy at the University of Cambridge from 1929, but a decade earlier had trained as a school teacher in Austria. It was while working at a village elementary school that the Haidbauer incident took place.

The boy's collapse was reported to the police, and Wittgenstein was summoned to appear in court in Gloggnitz on 17 May 1926, where the judge ordered a psychiatric report. According to the philosopher William Warren Bartley, the hearing exonerated Wittgenstein, although the Wittgenstein biographer Alexander Waugh writes that the outcome of the case was never published. Waugh argues that Wittgenstein's family may have had a hand in making the issue disappear.

Haidbauer was not the only pupil Wittgenstein was alleged to have struck. Ten years later, while working at Cambridge, he returned to the village, to a mixed reception, to ask for the children's forgiveness.

== Background ==
=== Trattenbach ===
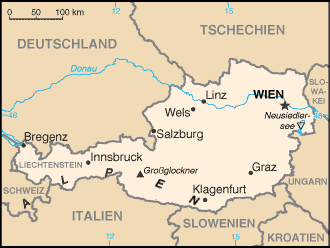
Wittgenstein's first teaching job was in Trattenbach, a village between Vienna (Wien) and Graz.

In August 1918 Wittgenstein completed his Tractatus Logico-Philosophicus, first published in 1921 in Germany and widely regarded as one of the most important works of 20th-century philosophy. After military service for Austria during the First World War, he decided to become an elementary school teacher. One of his sisters said this was like using a precision instrument to open crates.

He attended teacher-training college in the Kundmanngasse in Vienna in September 1919 and in 1920 was given his first job as a teacher in Trattenbach, a village about 90 km (56 mi) southwest of Vienna. He did not have a high opinion of the villagers, writing to Bertrand Russell in October 1921:

I am still at Trattenbach, surrounded, as ever, by odiousness and baseness. I know that human beings on the average are not worth much anywhere, but here they are much more good-for-nothing and irresponsible than elsewhere.

After renting a room in the attic of the local grocer's store, Wittgenstein was soon the object of gossip among the villagers, who regarded him with suspicion. Waugh writes that the brighter pupils remembered him with affection. He taught them about architecture, botany, geology, bought a microscope for them, made model steam engines, showed them how to dissect a squirrel and how to boil the flesh off a fox and then reassemble its skeleton. Hermine Wittgenstein, his older sister, watched him teach and said the pupils

literally crawled over each other in their desire to be chosen for answers or demonstrations.

He spent hours with favoured pupils, offering them extra tuition outside the classroom, sometimes until eight in the evening, which did not endear him to their parents. He would take them on overnight trips to Vienna to see museums and cathedrals; after one such trip the group had to hike at night through a forest for 12 miles from the station at Gloggnitz, back up the mountain to Trattenbach.

One boy, Karl Gruber, from an impoverished family with six children, became a favourite. The two studied Latin, Greek, and mathematics together from four to seven in the evening, then dined in Wittgenstein's room. He proposed to Karl's parents that he adopt the boy, offering to send him to the city and finance his education. The mother agreed, but the father said no and called Wittgenstein "ein verrückter Kerl" ("a crazy fellow").

=== Corporal punishment ===
Wittgenstein was reportedly seen as a tyrant by the slower students, boxing their ears (Ohrfeigen) as well as pulling hair (Haareziehen). He devoted the first two hours of each school day to mathematics, which some of the students recalled years later with horror, according to Ray Monk. One villager described him as "that totally insane fellow who wanted to introduce advanced mathematics to our elementary school children." The physical punishments were not unusual in Austria for boys at the time, but the villagers were unhappy that he was doing it to the girls too. Girls were not expected to grasp algebra, writes Monk, much less have their ears boxed over it.

Bartley interviewed some of the pupils in 1969. They told him that Wittgenstein was a nervous teacher. He would break out in a sweat, rub his chin, pull his hair, and bite into a crumpled handkerchief. Bartley suggests that, although it seems clear that Wittgenstein did hit the children, some of the incidents may have been exaggerated. One boy, the brother of the boy Wittgenstein had wanted to adopt, stuffed a pencil up his nose to make it bleed after Wittgenstein slapped him. The story of how Wittgenstein had given a boy a bloody nose spread, and soon other children were playing similar tricks, which included pretending to faint.

=== Hassbach and Puchberg ===
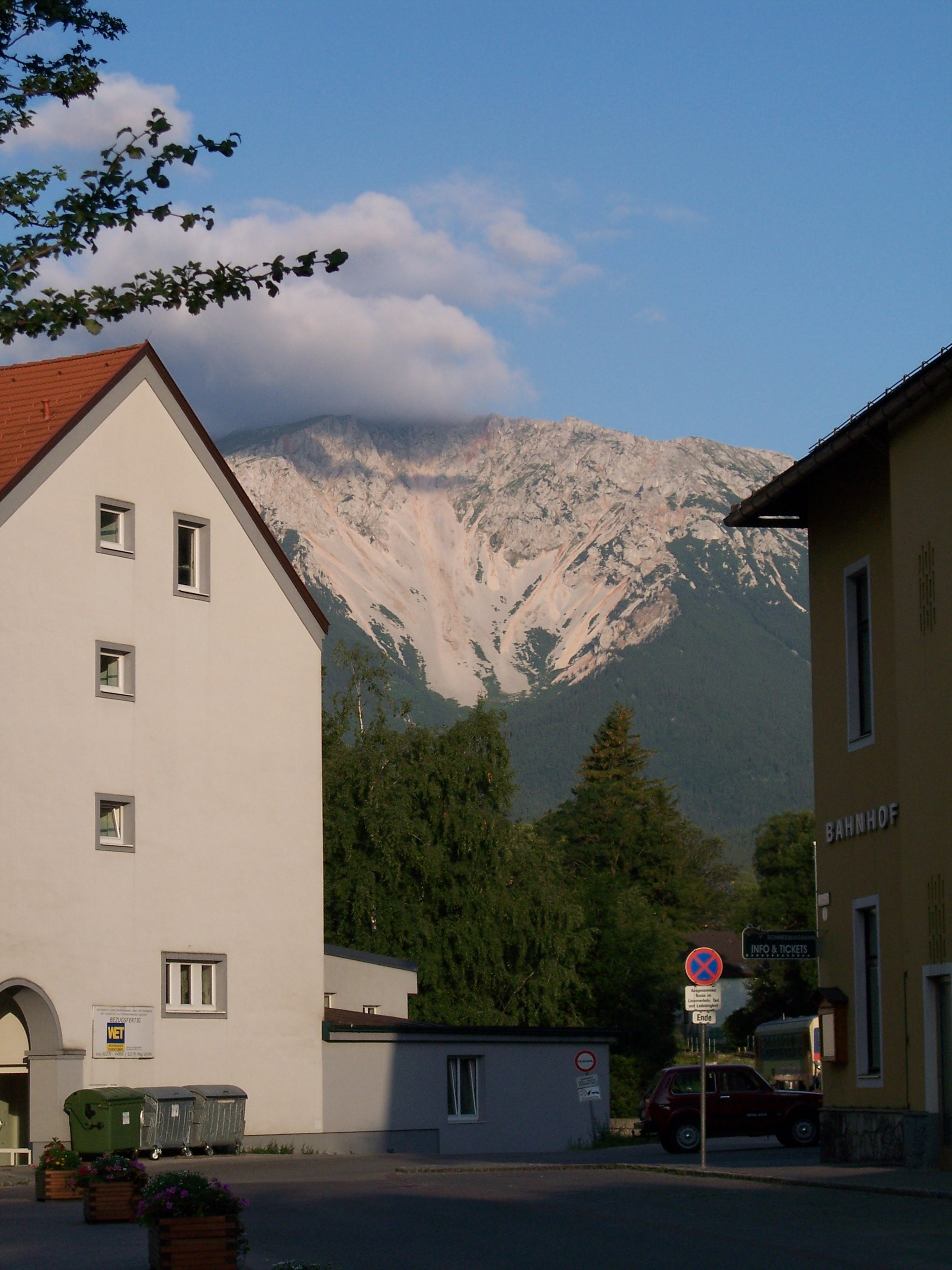
Frank Ramsey visited Wittgenstein in Puchberg in 1923.

In September 1922 he moved to a secondary school in Hassbach, but he left after a month, telling a friend:

These people are not human at all but loathsome worms.

In November he began work at a primary school in Puchberg am Schneeberg. He was lonely and had no one he could talk to about philosophy. From there he wrote to Russell:

I am now in another hole, though I have to say, it is no better than the old one. Living with human beings is hard! Only they are not really human, but rather 1/4 animal and 3/4 human.

A student from Cambridge, Frank Ramsey, arrived in Austria to visit him in September 1923 to discuss a review of the Tractatus he had agreed to write for Mind. He reported in a letter home:

He is very poor, at least he lives very economically. He has one tiny room, whitewashed, containing a bed, washstand, small table and one hard chair and that is all there is room for. His evening meal which I shared last night is rather unpleasant coarse bread, butter and cocoa. His school hours are eight to twelve or one and he seems to be free all the afternoon.

While in Cambridge, Ramsey told the economist John Maynard Keynes that Wittgenstein was refusing all financial help from his family, and was even returning Christmas presents they sent him, because he did not want to have any money he had not earned himself.

== Move to Otterthal ==
=== Encounter with Josef Haidbauer ===
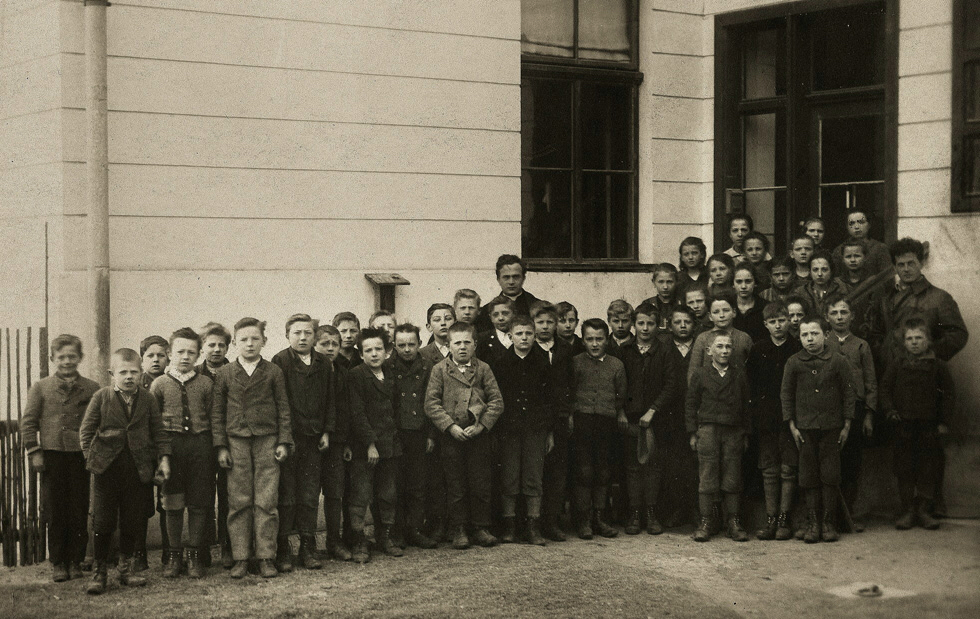
Wittgenstein with his pupils in Otterthal, 1925

In September 1924 Wittgenstein moved to a new school in Otterthal, near Trattenbach; the headmaster, Josef Putre, was someone Wittgenstein had become friends with at Trattenbach. Josef Haidbauer was one of Wittgenstein's pupils, 11 years old and by all accounts a weak child and slow learner. His father had died, and his mother worked locally as a maid for a farmer named Piribauer. Piribauer himself had a daughter, Hermine, in Wittgenstein's class. Wittgenstein had reportedly pulled her so hard by the ears and hair that her ears had bled, and some of her hair had fallen out.

During a lesson in April 1926 Wittgenstein hit Haidbauer two or three times on the head, and the boy supposedly collapsed unconscious. Wittgenstein sent the class home, carried Haidbauer to the headmaster's office, then left the building. He bumped into Herr Piribauer on the way out, who had arrived at the school after the children alerted him. Piribauer said that when he met Wittgenstein in the hall that day:

I called him all the names under the sun. I told him he wasn't a teacher, he was an animal trainer! And that I was going to fetch the police right away!

Another pupil, August Riegler, said of the incident:

It cannot be said that Wittgenstein ill-treated the child. If Haidbauer's punishment was ill-treatment, then 80 percent of Wittgenstein's punishments were ill-treatments.

Piribauer tried to have Wittgenstein arrested, but the one-man police station was empty when he went there, and the next day he was told Wittgenstein had disappeared. On 28 April, Wittgenstein handed in his resignation to Wilhelm Kundt, a local school inspector. He returned to Vienna, where he took a job as an assistant gardener in the Brothers of Mercy monastery in Hütteldorf.

According to Wittgenstein biographer William Warren Bartley III, Wittgenstein's pupils would sometimes pretend to faint when struck by Wittgenstein and that "those of Wittgenstein's old students who had faked fainting themselves believe today that this boy too was faking. But there is no way to know".

=== Trial ===
Wittgenstein was summoned to appear before the district court in Gloggnitz on 17 May 1926. Waugh writes that he lied to the court about his use of physical punishment against the children. The judge suspected he was mentally ill, and ordered an adjournment for psychiatric reports. Wittgenstein continued to live in Vienna while the case continued, writing to a friend, Rudolf Koder:

I'm curious to know what the psychiatrist will say to me, but I find the idea of the examination nauseating and am heartily sick of the whole filthy business.

A letter in August 1926 to Wittgenstein from a friend of his, Ludwig Hänsel, indicated that the hearings were continuing, but nothing is known about the case after that. Wittgenstein's family was one of the wealthiest in Europe at the time, and Waugh writes that they may have managed to cover things up. According to Monk, the hearings were a source of great humiliation to Wittgenstein.

== Apology ==
Ten years later Wittgenstein was living in Norway and went through a period of wanting to make confessions to his friends about various matters, one of which was his use of violence against the children in Austria. One of the friends he confessed to, Fania Pascal, recalled the confession as:

During the short period when he was teaching at a village school in Austria, he hit a little girl in his class and hurt her (my memory is, without details, of a physically violent act). When she ran to the headmaster to complain, Wittgenstein denied that he had done it.

Another friend, Rowland Hutt, remembered the confession differently, and said it concerned having lied about the Haidbauer incident during the court case. In the same year that Wittgenstein made this confession to friends, he also travelled to Otterthal and appeared without warning at the homes of the children he had hurt. He visited at least four of them, asking for their forgiveness. One villager, George Stangel, recalled:

I myself was not a pupil of Wittgenstein's, but I was present when shortly before the war Wittgenstein visited my father's home to apologize to my brother and my father. Wittgenstein came at midday, at about one o'clock, into the kitchen and asked me where Ignaz is. I called my brother, my father was also present. Wittgenstein said that he wanted to apologize if he had done him an injustice. Ignaz said that he had no need to apologize, he had learned well from Wittgenstein. Wittgenstein stayed for about half an hour and mentioned that he also wanted to go to Gansterer and Goldberg to beg their pardon in a similar way.

He also visited Hermine Piribauer, the girl whose ears he had pulled, who apparently replied to the apology with, according to Monk, "a disdainful 'Ja, ja'". Monk writes that Wittgenstein regarded the confessions as a form of surgery to remove cowardice. In 1937 he wrote in a notebook:

Last year with God's help I pulled myself together and made a confession. This brought me into more settled waters, into a better relation with people, and to a greater seriousness. But now it is as though I had spent all that, and I am not far from where I was before. I am cowardly beyond measure. If I do not correct this, I shall again drift entirely into those waters through which I was moving then.
