= Paul Engelmann =

- פול אנגלמן
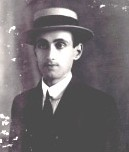
- Born: 14 June 1891; Olomouc, Moravia, Austria-Hungary
- Died: 5 February 1965 (aged 73); Tel Aviv, Israel
- Occupation: Architect
- Known for: Building the Stonborough House

Paul Engelmann (Hebrew: פול אנגלמן; 14 June 1891 – 5 February 1965) was an Israeli architect of Czech-Austrian descent. He worked in Olomouc and in Vienna and is now known for his friendship with the philosopher Ludwig Wittgenstein between 1916 and 1928, and for being Wittgenstein's partner in the design and building of the Stonborough House in Vienna. His Letters from Ludwig Wittgenstein With a Memoir was translated by L. Furtmüller and published in 1967 by Basil Blackwell.

== Education ==
Engelmann was born at Olomouc, Moravia, Austria-Hungary in 1891, and studied with the modernist architect Adolf Loos in Vienna. He was supposedly Loos's favourite pupil. He was private secretary to Karl Kraus.

== Career ==
After the end of World War I, Engelmann maintained an active career as an architect in Europe and designed private houses in various cities. His work followed Loos' design principles, examples including the Stonborough House, in Vienna (1926–1928), the Vladimir Müller residence in Olomouc (1926–1928) and the Yedlin residence on Mount Carmel, Haifa (1936).

== Stonborough House ==
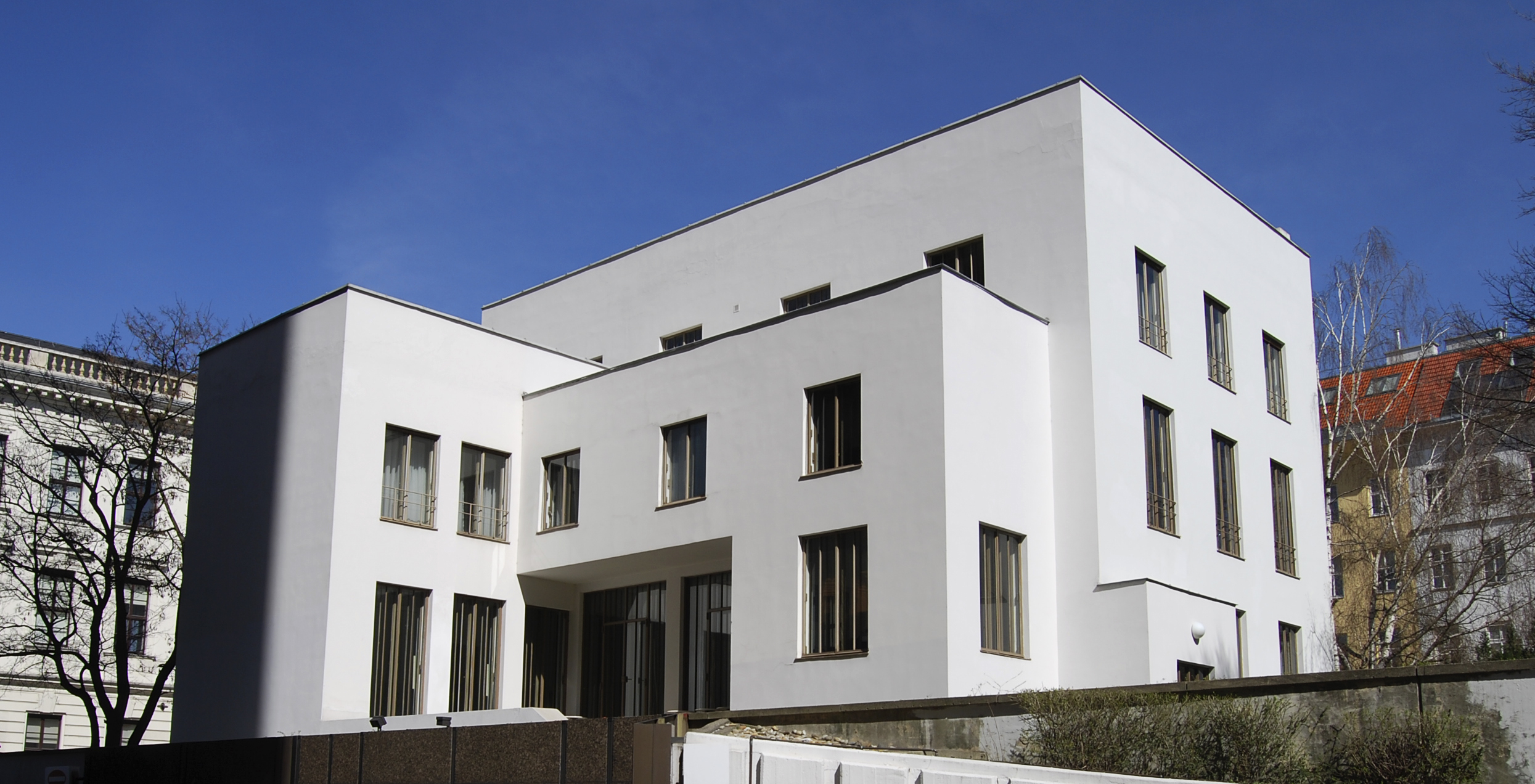
Haus Wittgenstein, also known as Stonborough House. Since 1975 it has housed the cultural department of the Bulgarian Embassy.

In November 1925, Wittgenstein's sister Margaret Stonborough-Wittgenstein commissioned Engelmann, to design and build a large town house in Vienna in the Kundmanngasse. Wittgenstein showed a great interest in the project and in Engelmann's plans. He convinced Engelmann that he could realise his sister's intentions much better and was eventually asked to be the architect of the house.

== After Vienna ==
Engelmann emigrated to the Palestine region in 1934. He later settled in Tel Aviv, Israel, where he died on 5 February 1965. He dedicated less time to his architectural work, instead focusing on writing about his experiences with Loos, Kraus and Wittgenstein, but in 1947 he designed the interiors of the Jordanian Parliament and the throne hall of King Abdulla in Amman, Jordan.
