= Haus Wittgenstein =

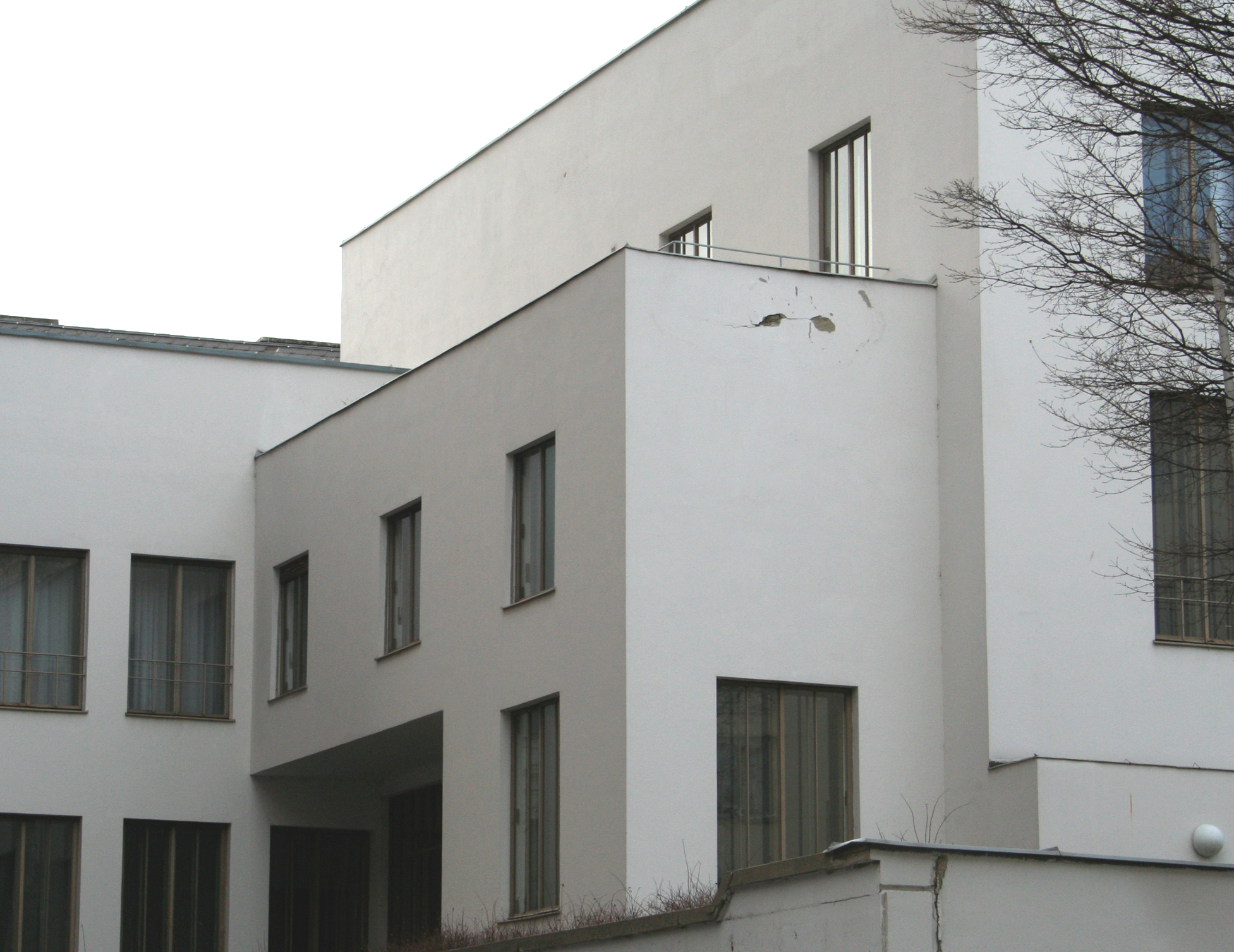
- Haus Wittgenstein
- Alternative names: Stonborough House, Wittgenstein House

General information
- Architectural style: Modernist
- Location: Kundmanngasse, Vienna, Austria
- Coordinates: 48.20325°N 16.39431°E
- Current tenants: Bulgarian Embassy
- Opened: 25 December 1928
- Client: Margaret Stonborough-Wittgenstein

Design and construction
- Architect: Paul Engelmann

Haus Wittgenstein (also known as the Stonborough House and the Wittgenstein House) is a house in the modernist style on the Kundmanngasse, Vienna, Austria. The house was commissioned by Margaret Stonborough-Wittgenstein, who asked the architect Paul Engelmann to design a townhouse for her. Stonborough-Wittgenstein invited her brother, the philosopher Ludwig Wittgenstein, to help with the design.

== Commission ==
In November 1925 Stonborough-Wittgenstein commissioned Engelmann to design a large townhouse. She later invited her brother, Ludwig Wittgenstein, to help with the design, in part to distract him from the scandal surrounding the Haidbauer incident in April 1926: Wittgenstein, while working as a primary-school teacher, had hit a boy who had subsequently collapsed.

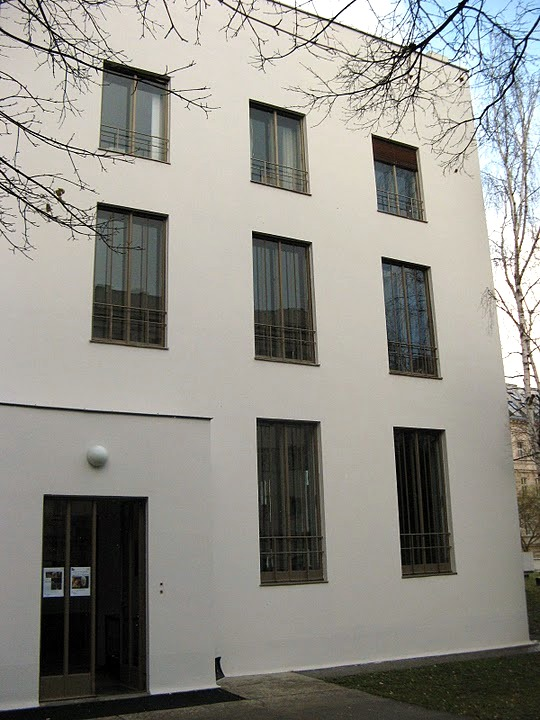
Wittgenstein worked on Haus Wittgenstein between 1926 and 1929.

The initial architect was Paul Engelmann, someone Wittgenstein had come to know while training to be an artillery officer in Olomouc. Engelmann designed a spare modernist house after the style of Adolf Loos: three rectangular blocks. Wittgenstein showed a great interest in the project and in Engelmann's plans and poured himself into the project for over two years, to such a degree that Engelmann himself considered Wittgenstein the author of the final product. He focused on the windows, doors, doorknobs, and radiators, demanding that every detail be exactly as he specified, to the point where everyone involved in the project was exhausted. When the house was nearly finished, he had a ceiling raised 30 mm so that the room had the exact proportions he wanted.

One of the architects, Jacques Groag, wrote in a letter: "I come home very depressed with a headache after a day of the worst quarrels, disputes, vexations, and this happens often. Mostly between me and Wittgenstein."

Waugh writes that Margaret eventually refused to pay for the changes Wittgenstein kept demanding, so he bought himself a lottery ticket in the hope of paying for things that way. It took him a year to design the door handles and another to design the radiators. Each window was covered by a metal screen that weighed 150 kg, moved by a pulley Wittgenstein designed. Bernhard Leitner, author of The Architecture of Ludwig Wittgenstein, said of it that there is barely anything comparable in the history of interior design: "It is as ingenious as it is expensive. A metal curtain that could be lowered into the floor."

== Completion ==
"I am not interested in erecting a building, but in [...] presenting to myself the foundations of all possible buildings."

— Ludwig Wittgenstein

The house was finished by December 1928, and the family gathered there that Christmas to celebrate its completion. Describing the work, Ludwig's eldest sister, Hermine, wrote: "Even though I admired the house very much, I always knew that I neither wanted to, nor could, live in it myself. It seemed indeed to be much more a dwelling for the gods than for a small mortal like me". Paul Wittgenstein, Ludwig's brother, disliked it, and when Margaret's nephew came to sell it, he reportedly did so on the grounds that she had never liked it either.

Wittgenstein himself found the house too austere, saying it had good manners, but no primordial life or health. He nevertheless seemed committed to the idea of becoming an architect: the Vienna City Directory listed him as "Dr Ludwig Wittgenstein, occupation: architect" between 1933 and 1938.

== After World War II ==
After World War II, the house became a barracks and stables for Russian soldiers. It was owned by Thomas Stonborough, son of Margaret, until 1968, when it was sold to the developer and former SS-Member Franz Katlein, for demolition. For two years after this the house was under threat of demolition. The Vienna Landmark Commission saved it — after a campaign by Bernhard Leitner — and made it a national monument in 1971. Since 1975 it has housed the cultural department of the Bulgarian Embassy.

== Gallery ==
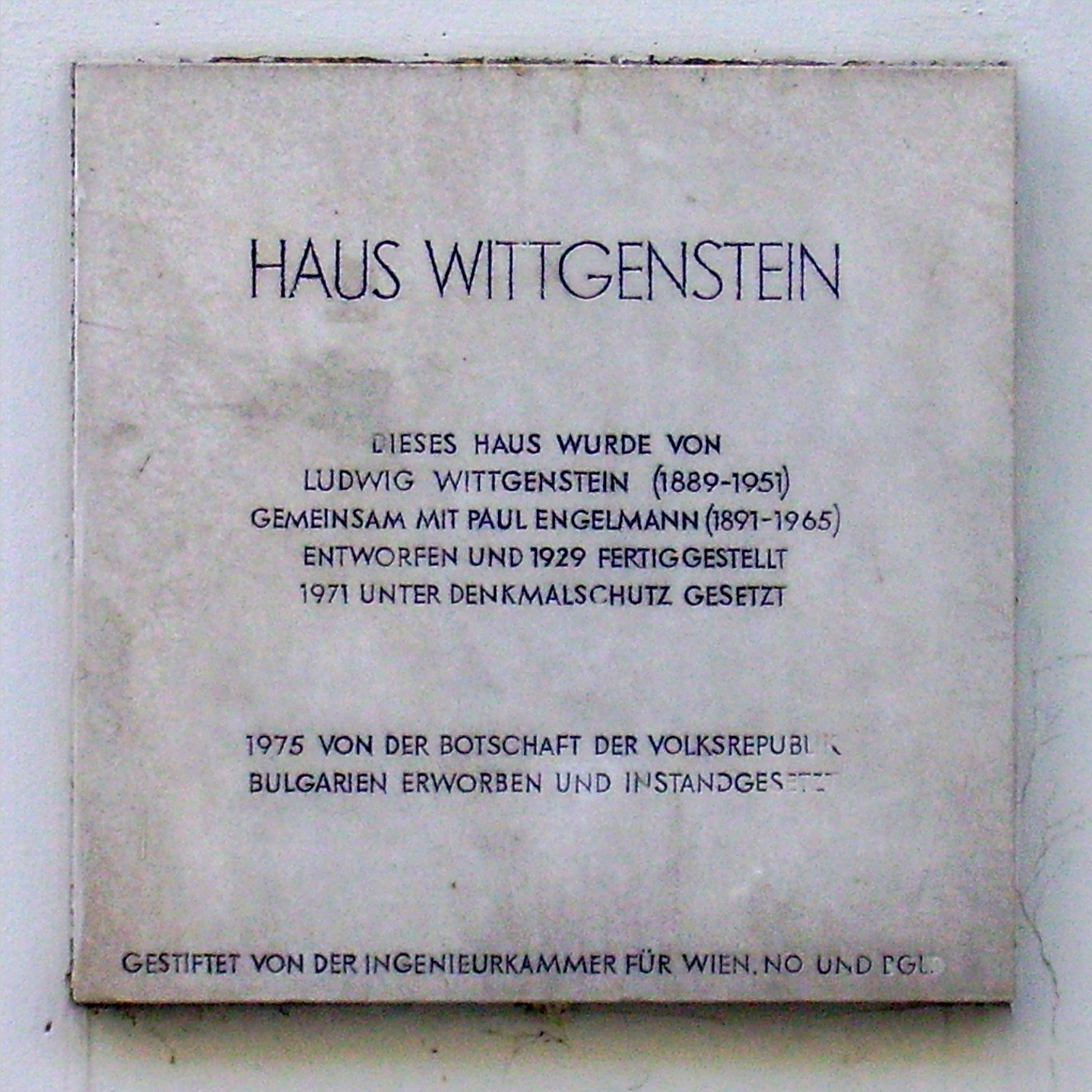
A plaque on the house, now the cultural department of the Bulgarian Embassy

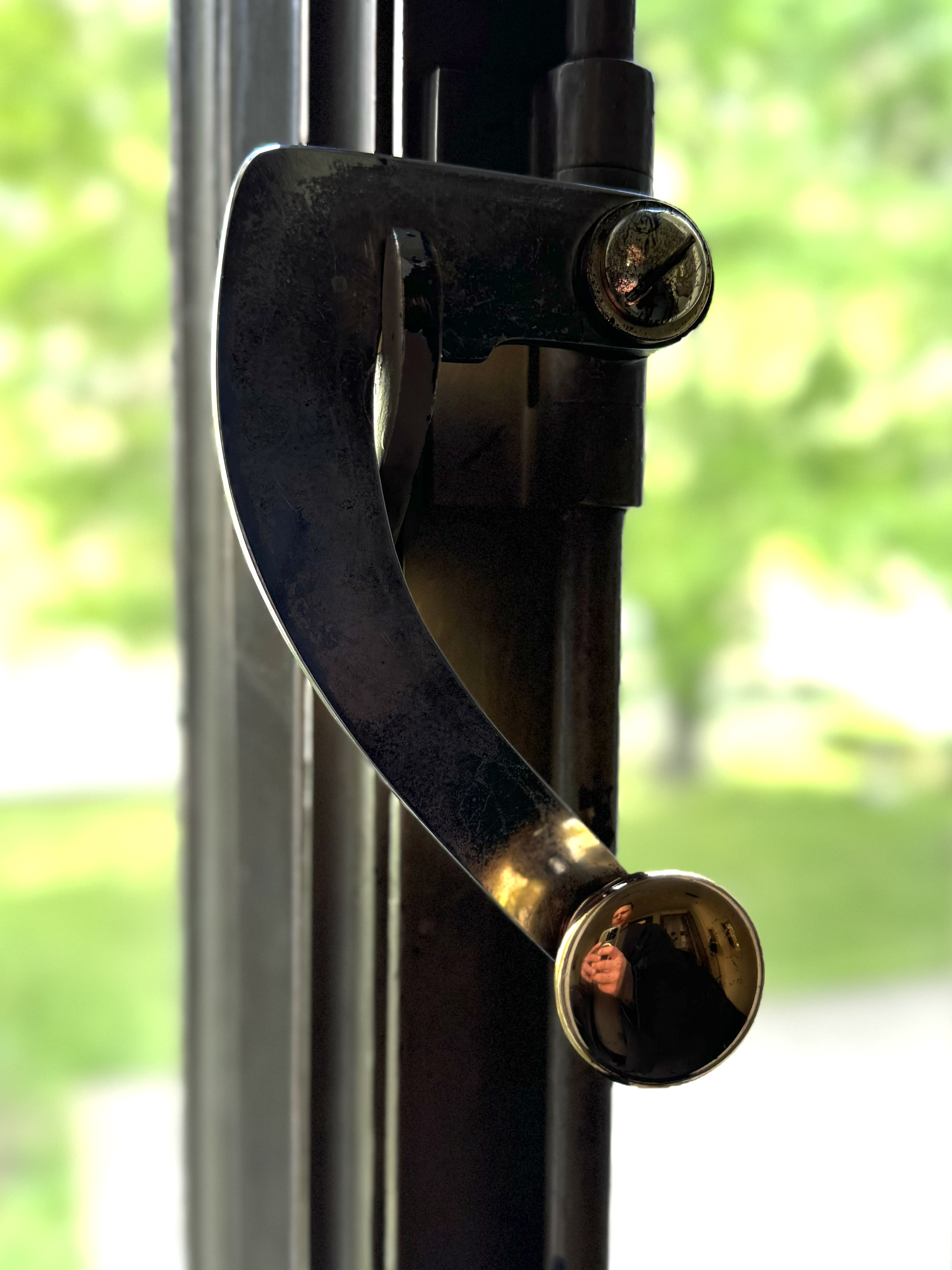
Window catch designed by Wittgenstein

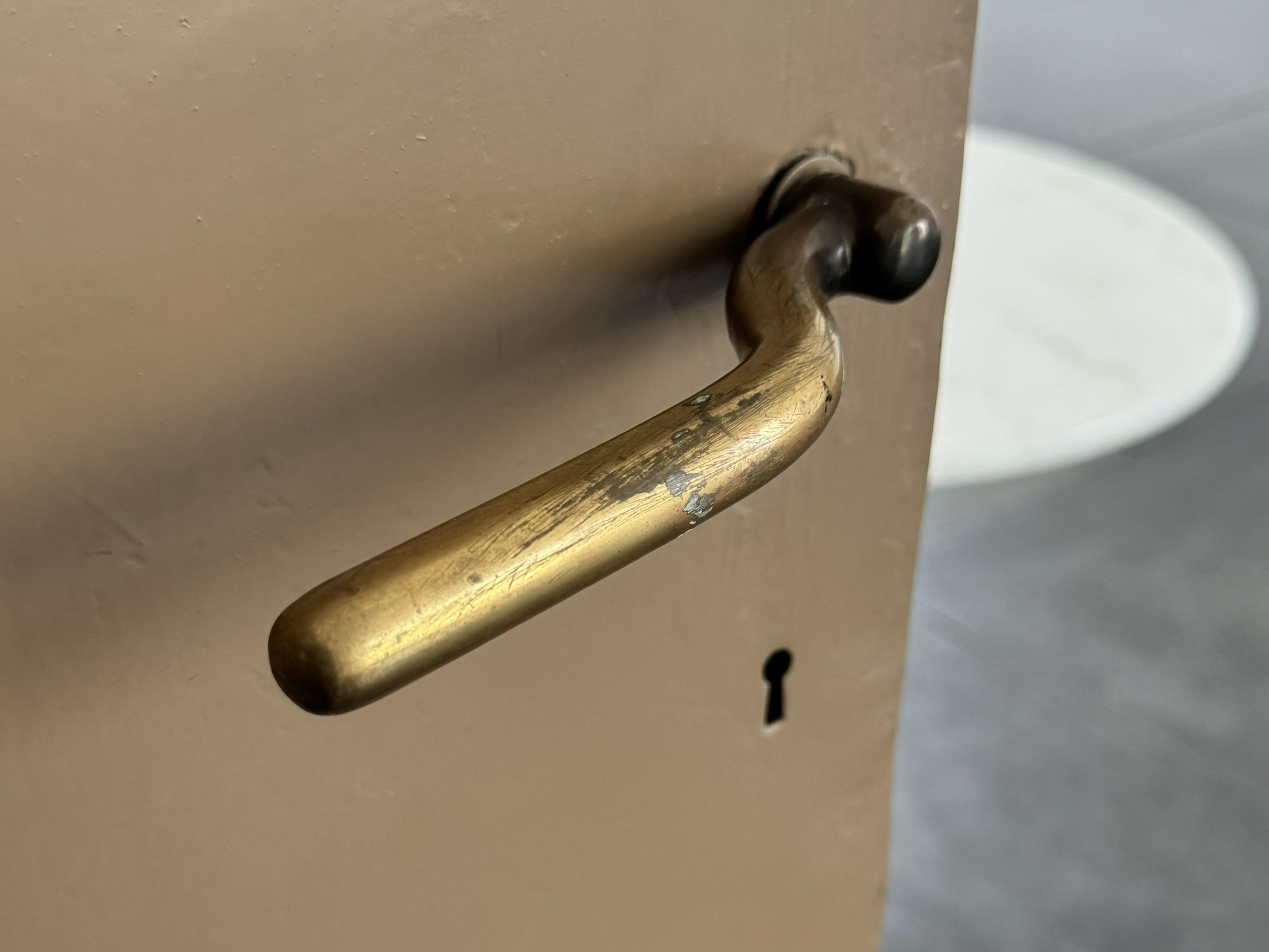
Door handle designed by Wittgenstein

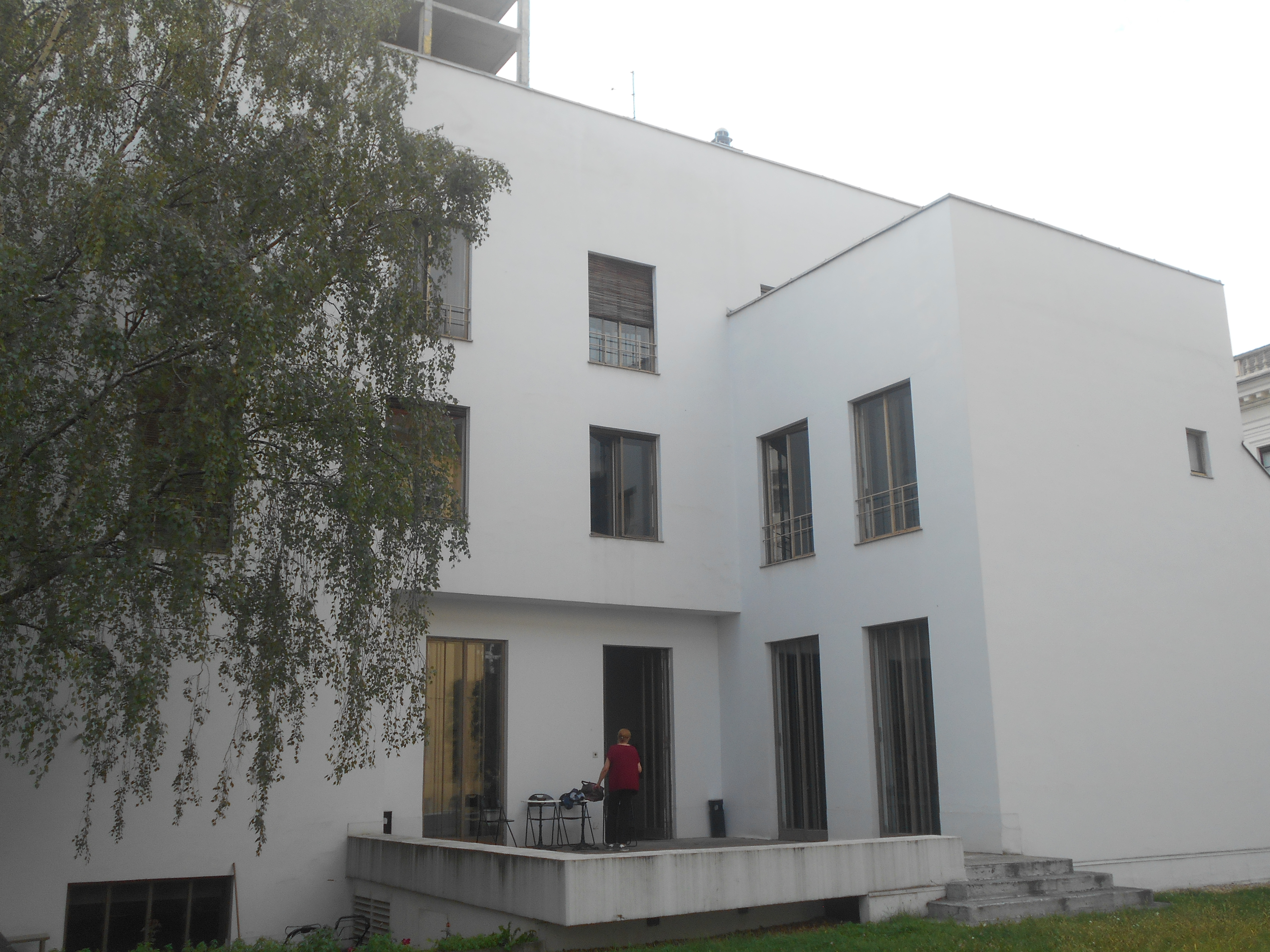

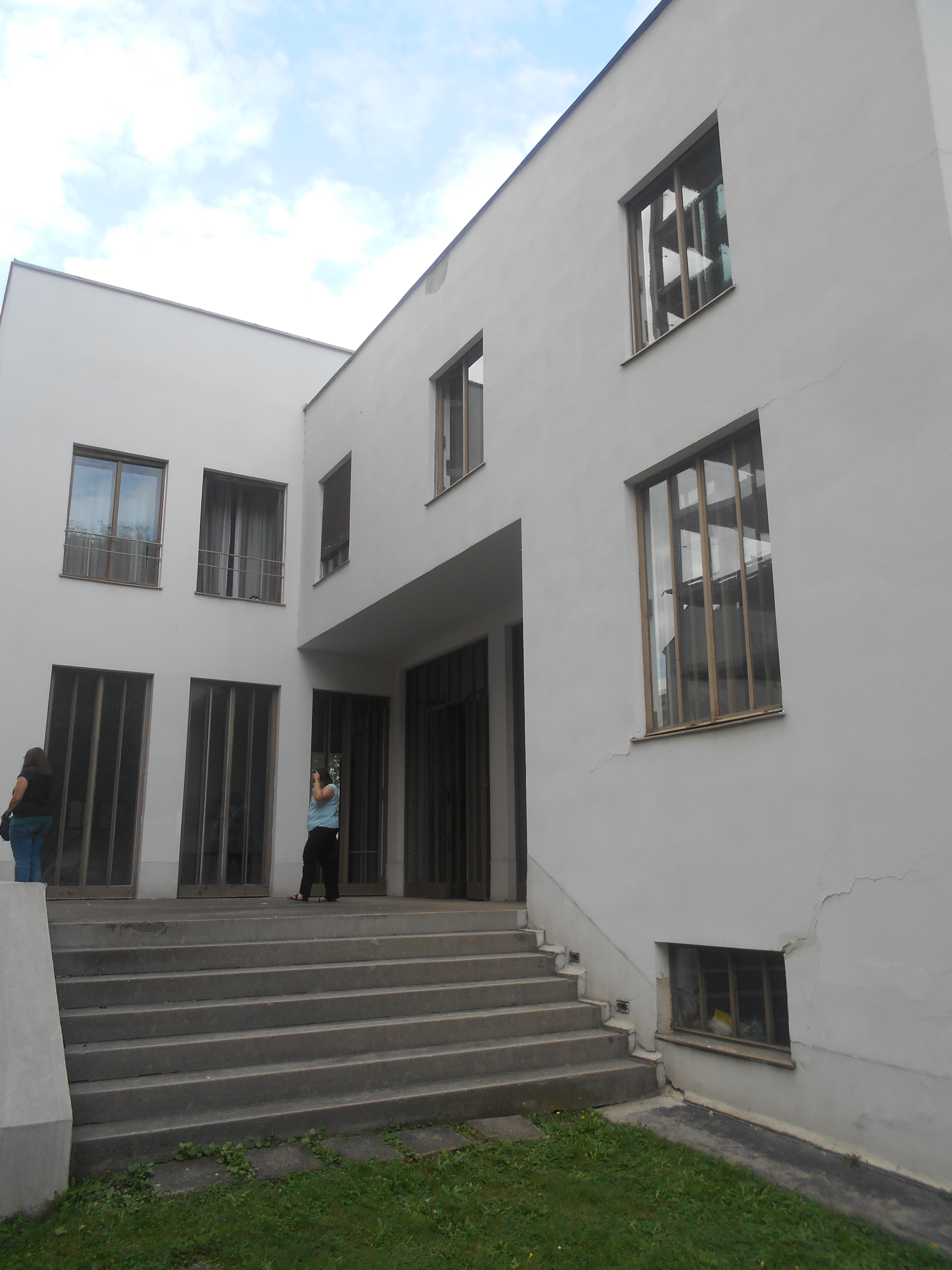

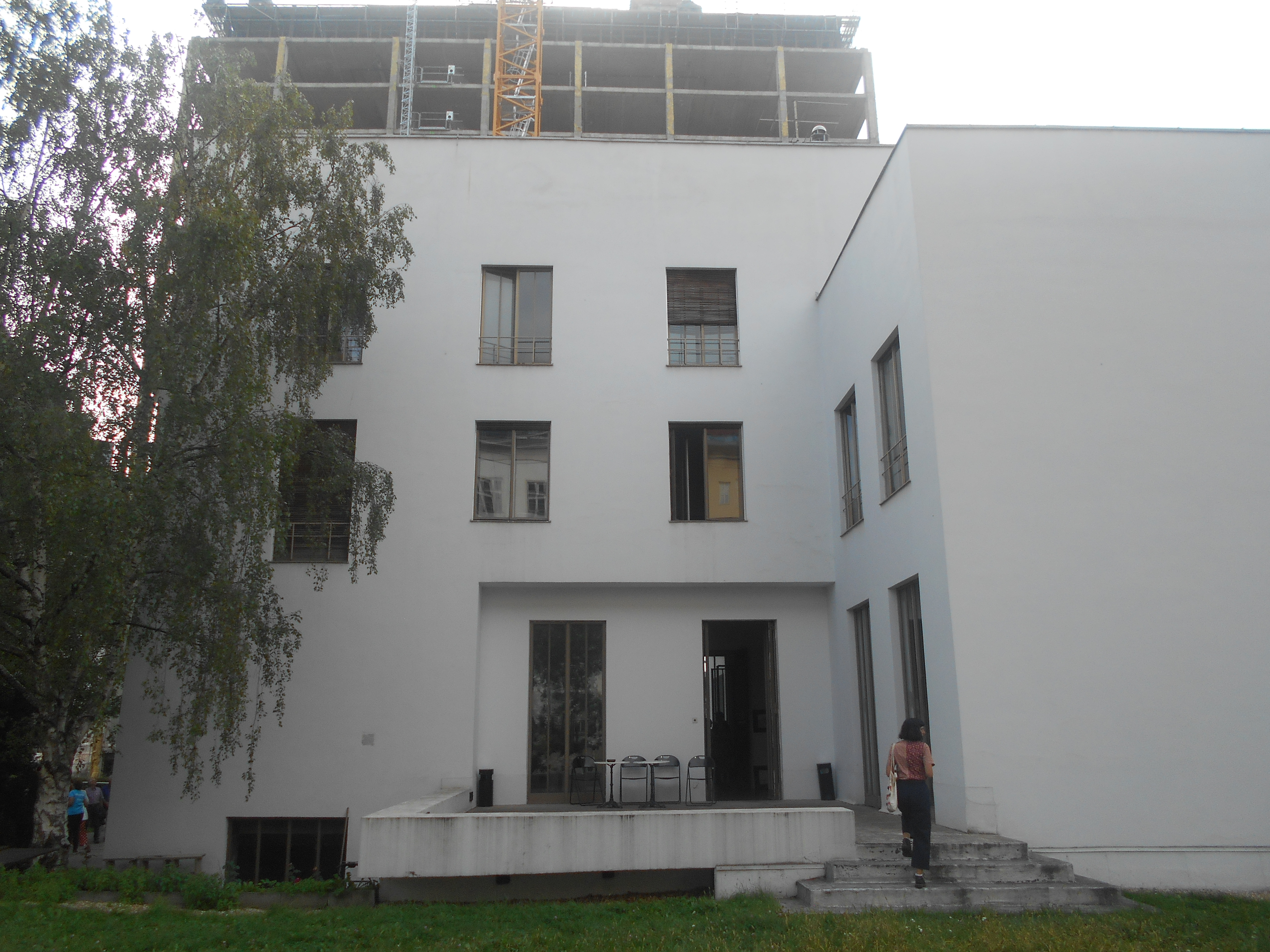
