= Karl Wittgenstein =

Austro-Hungarian steel tycoon (1847–1913)

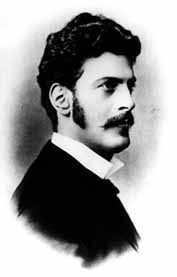
- Karl Wittgenstein in his young years
- Born: Karl Otto Clemens Wittgenstein; 8 April 1847; Gohlis, Kingdom of Saxony
- Died: 20 January 1913 (aged 65); Vienna, Austria-Hungary
- Occupation: Steel tycoon
- Spouse: Leopoldine Maria Josefa Kalmus (m. 1873)
- Children: 9, including Ludwig, Margaret, Paul

Karl Otto Clemens Wittgenstein (8 April 1847 – 20 January 1913) was a German-born Austrian steel tycoon. A friend of Andrew Carnegie, to whom he is often compared, at the end of the 19th century he had an effective monopoly on steel and iron resources in the Austro-Hungarian Empire. By the 1890s he had acquired one of the largest fortunes in the world.

He was the father of concert pianist Paul Wittgenstein, philosopher Ludwig Wittgenstein, and philanthropist Margaret Stonborough-Wittgenstein.

== Family background and origins ==
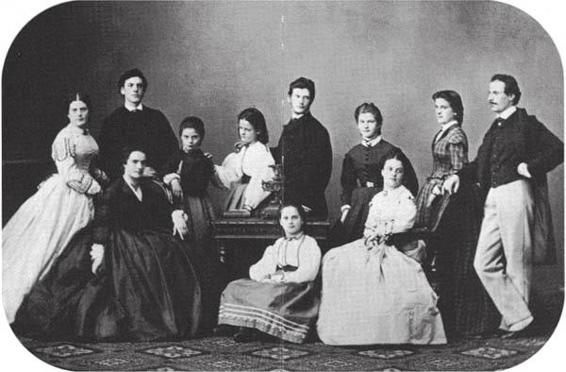
The eleven sons and daughters of Hermann and Fanny Wittgenstein, Karl second from left

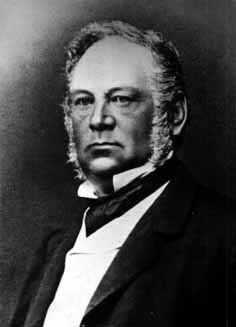
Karl's father, Hermann Wittgenstein 1802–1878

Karl Wittgenstein's grandfather was Moses Meyer, an estate manager who came from Laasphe in the former Wittgenstein kreis (county). He moved to Korbach before 1802, where he was a wool wholesaler.

Around 1808, Meyer named himself Wittgenstein, after his birthplace Siegen-Wittgenstein, and thereafter was known as Moses Meyer Wittgenstein.

At first, Wittgenstein's business became Korbach's biggest and most successful enterprise, but it soon began to decline. He had a son, Hermann Christian (born 12 September 1802 in Korbach; died 1878 in Vienna) who moved the business to Gohlis at the end of the 1830s. From there, the family continued to prosper. In 1938, to escape Nazi racial laws and be reclassified as half Jewish, his descendants claimed that Herman Christian was not Moses Meyer Wittgenstein's son but rather the illegitimate offspring of a prince of the House of Waldeck.

After Hermann Christian converted to Protestantism, he married Fanny Figdor in 1839. She came from one of Vienna's most important business families, and like Hermann was Jewish by birth.

Karl was the sixth of eleven children of Hermann and Fanny. Three years later after his birth, the family moved to Vösendorf (Mödling district) in Austria, where his four younger siblings were born. One of his brothers, Paul Wittgenstein (1842–1928), was the father of Karl Paul Wittgenstein, who married Hilde Köchert, daughter of renowned Viennese jeweller Heinrich Köchert: their son Paul Wittgenstein (1907–1979) was "Wittgenstein's Nephew", the central character of a book by his friend Thomas Bernhard.

== Biography ==
=== Early life and career ===
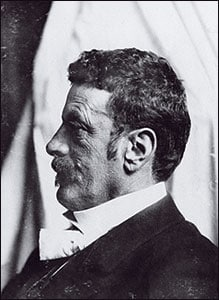
Profile portrait of Karl Wittgenstein, 1910

In his youth, Karl resisted the classical teaching methods imposed upon Viennese bourgeois children. He ran away from home at 11, and at 17 had been expelled from school for an essay he wrote in which he denied the "immortality of the soul". His father, Hermann, continued to educate him by hiring private tutors to ensure Karl passed his exams, but Karl ran away again, staying in Vienna for a couple of months before fleeing to New York with little money and his violin. Monk writes, "He managed nevertheless to maintain himself for over two years by working as a waiter, a saloon musician, a bartender and a teacher (of the violin, the horn, mathematics, German and anything else he could think of)." He returned to Vienna in 1867 and pursued his interest in engineering. After a year of education and an apprenticeship, Karl took the job of a draughtsman on the construction of a rolling mill in Bohemia, a post offered to him by Paul Kupelwieser, the brother of his brother-in-law. Karl rapidly rose through the company, taking over Kupelweiser as Managing Director within five years. By the end of the 19th century, Karl Wittgenstein was one of the wealthiest men in Europe and a leading figure in the iron and steel industry. In 1898, he retired from his posts and transferred much of his wealth to foreign equities, principally in the United States, which protected the Wittgenstein family from the inflation in Vienna after the First World War.

=== Children ===
Karl married Leopoldine Maria Josefa Kalmus, known among friends as Poldi, in 1873. She was the only spouse of any of Hermann Christian's children who had a Jewish background; her father was a Bohemian Jew and her mother was Austrian-Slovene Catholic. They had the following children:

- Hermine "Mining" (b. 1 December 1874 in Teplitz; d. 11 February 1950 in Vienna) unmarried
- Dora (b. 1876 in Vienna; died at birth)
- Johannes "Hans" (b. 1877 in Vienna; d. 1902 in Chesapeake Bay, probable suicide), a musical prodigy
- Konrad "Kurt" (b. 1 May 1878 in Vienna; d. October/November 1918, suicide)
- Helene "Lenka" (b. 23 August 1879 in Vienna; d. April 1956 in Vienna) married to Dr. Max Salzer
- Rudolf "Rudi" (b. 27 June 1881 in Vienna; d. 2 May 1904 in Berlin, suicide)
- Margaret "Gretl" (b. 19 September 1882 in Vienna; d. 27 September 1958 in Vienna) married to Jerome Stonborough in 1904, divorced in 1923
- Paul (b. 11 May 1887 in Vienna; d. 3 March 1961 in New York), concert pianist
- Ludwig "Lucki" (b. 26 April 1889 in Vienna; d. 29 April 1951 in Cambridge), philosopher
