= Margaret Stonborough-Wittgenstein =

Austrian philanthropist (1882–1958)

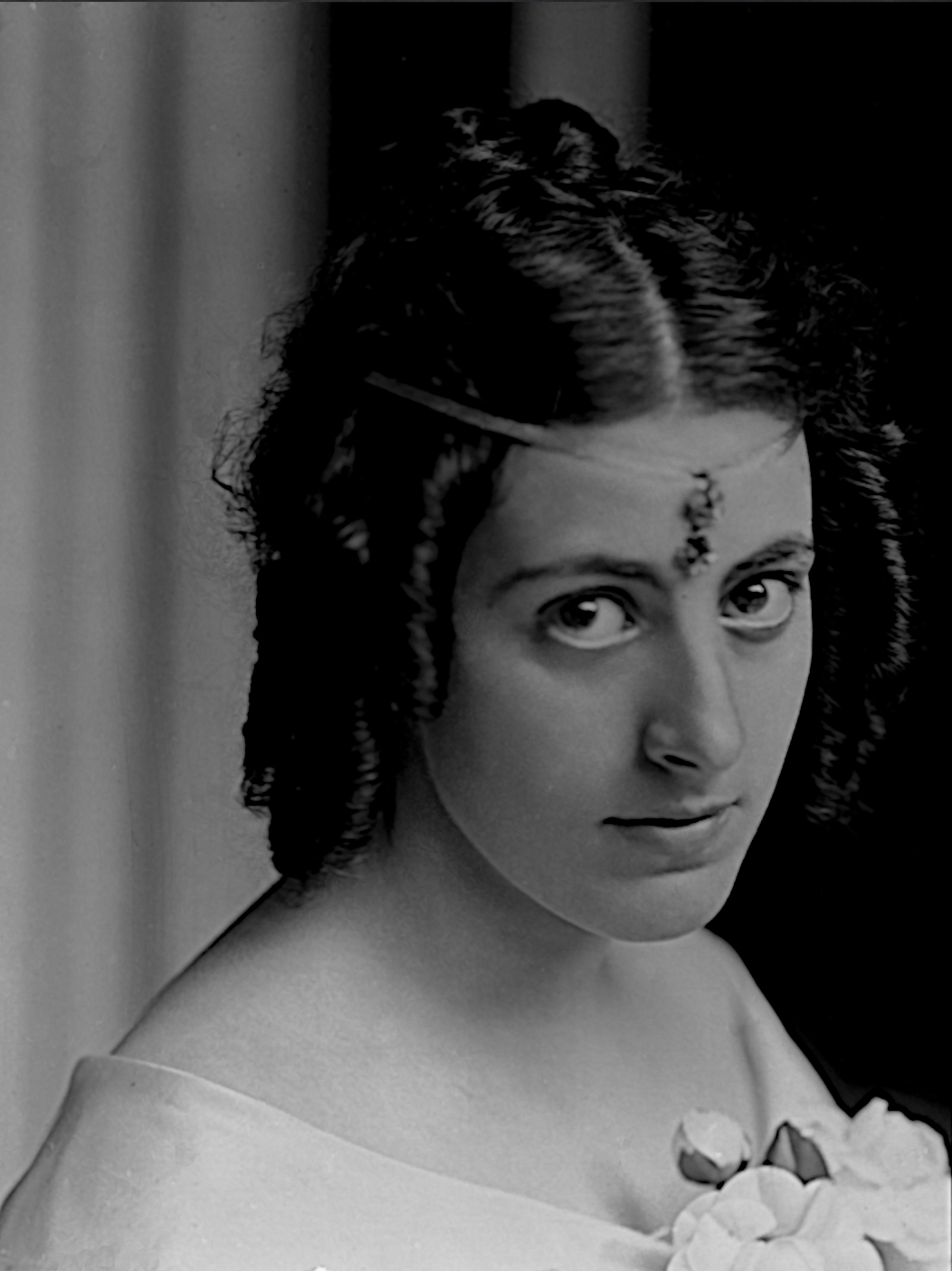
- Photo by Ferdinand Schmutzer, 1903
- Born: Margaret Wittgenstein; 19 September 1882; Vienna, Austria-Hungary
- Died: 27 September 1958 (aged 76)
- Known for: Subject of a Klimt portrait painting, sister of the philosopher Ludwig Wittgenstein and the pianist Paul Wittgenstein
- Spouse: Jerome Stonborough (m. 1905; div. 1938)
- Children: 2
- Parents: Karl Wittgenstein (father); Leopoldine Maria Josefa Kalmus (mother)

Margaret "Gretl" Stonborough-Wittgenstein (19 September 1882 – 27 September 1958) was a sister of the philosopher Ludwig Wittgenstein and the pianist Paul Wittgenstein and a member of the wealthy Viennese Wittgenstein family. She was the subject of a famous 1905 portrait painted for her wedding by the artist Gustav Klimt (Stonborough-Wittgenstein and other members of the Wittgenstein family were among Klimt's most important patrons), which was sold in 1960 by her son Thomas and may now be seen in the Alte Pinakothek gallery in Munich.

== Biography ==
=== Marriage and children ===
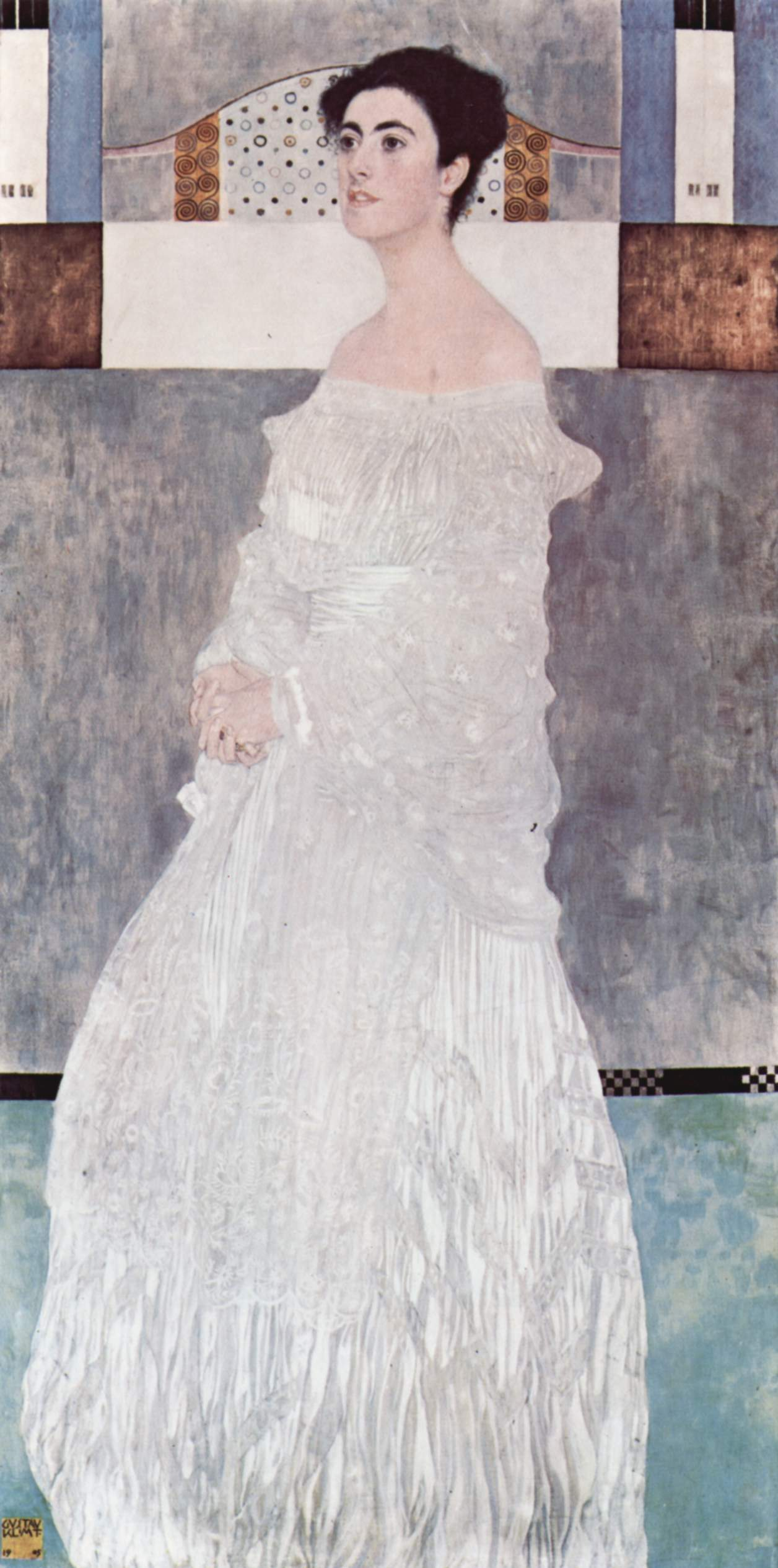
Margarethe Stonborough-Wittgenstein painted by Gustav Klimt for her wedding portrait in 1905

On 7 January 1905, she married a wealthy American art collector, Jerome Stonborough (1873 – June 1938), who was of German Jewish ancestry and born Jerome Herman Steinberger; he had had his name changed to Stonborough in 1900. Margaret and Jerome were close friends with Hermann Rothe, and Margaret was the godmother of his daughter Margarethe. The couple had two sons and divorced in 1938; Jerome committed suicide shortly thereafter.

Her first son was Dr. Thomas Humphrey Stonborough (1906–1986). His Swiss friend Marguerite Respinger (1904–2000), whom he had met when he was studying in Cambridge and had invited to Vienna, was briefly (1926–1931) the only known female interest of Ludwig Wittgenstein. In 1939, Thomas married Elizabeth Churchill, but they soon divorced (she was to remarry Washington Evening Star columnist Constantine Brown, and became a journalist and anti-communist activist under the name of Elizabeth Churchill Brown). Haus Wittgenstein was owned by Thomas until 1968 when it was sold to a developer for demolition.

Her second son was Major John Jerome Stonborough (11 June 1912 - 29 April 2002), who, although a US citizen, served in the Canadian Army during Second World War as an intelligence officer and interpreter. He married Veronica Morrison-Bell, daughter of Sir Claude William Hedley Morrison-Bell, 2nd Baronet, and after the war lived between Britain and Austria.

=== Career ===
After the First World War, Stonborough-Wittgenstein was appointed by the American Relief Administrator Herbert Hoover (later president of the United States) as special representative of the American Relief Program for Austria. When working in juvenile prisons as a psychotherapy adviser, she came into contact with Sigmund Freud and was analyzed by him over the course of two years. They remained in contact until Freud's death.

=== Haus Wittgenstein ===
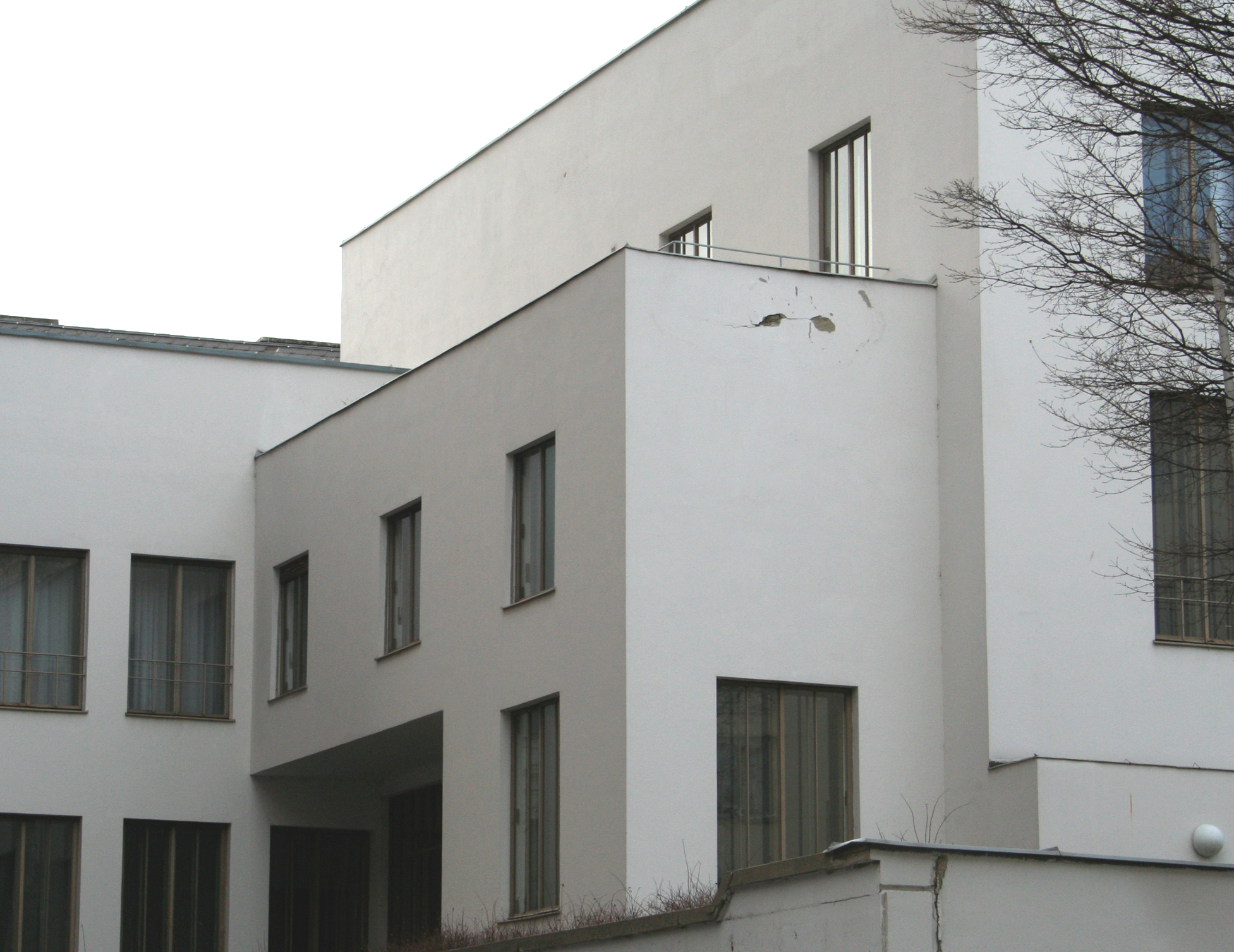
Haus Wittgenstein, also known as Stonborough House, in Vienna

In 1926, she commissioned her brother Ludwig and the architect Paul Engelmann to design and build Haus Wittgenstein in Vienna. Sold by her son Thomas in 1968, the building now houses the Bulgarian Cultural Institute.

=== Final years ===
In 1940, she emigrated to the US, but returned to Austria after the war and obtained restitution of part of her wealth that had been confiscated by the Third Reich. She moved back into Haus Wittgenstein until her death in 1958, passing the house on to her son, Thomas.
