= Otterthal =

- Municipality
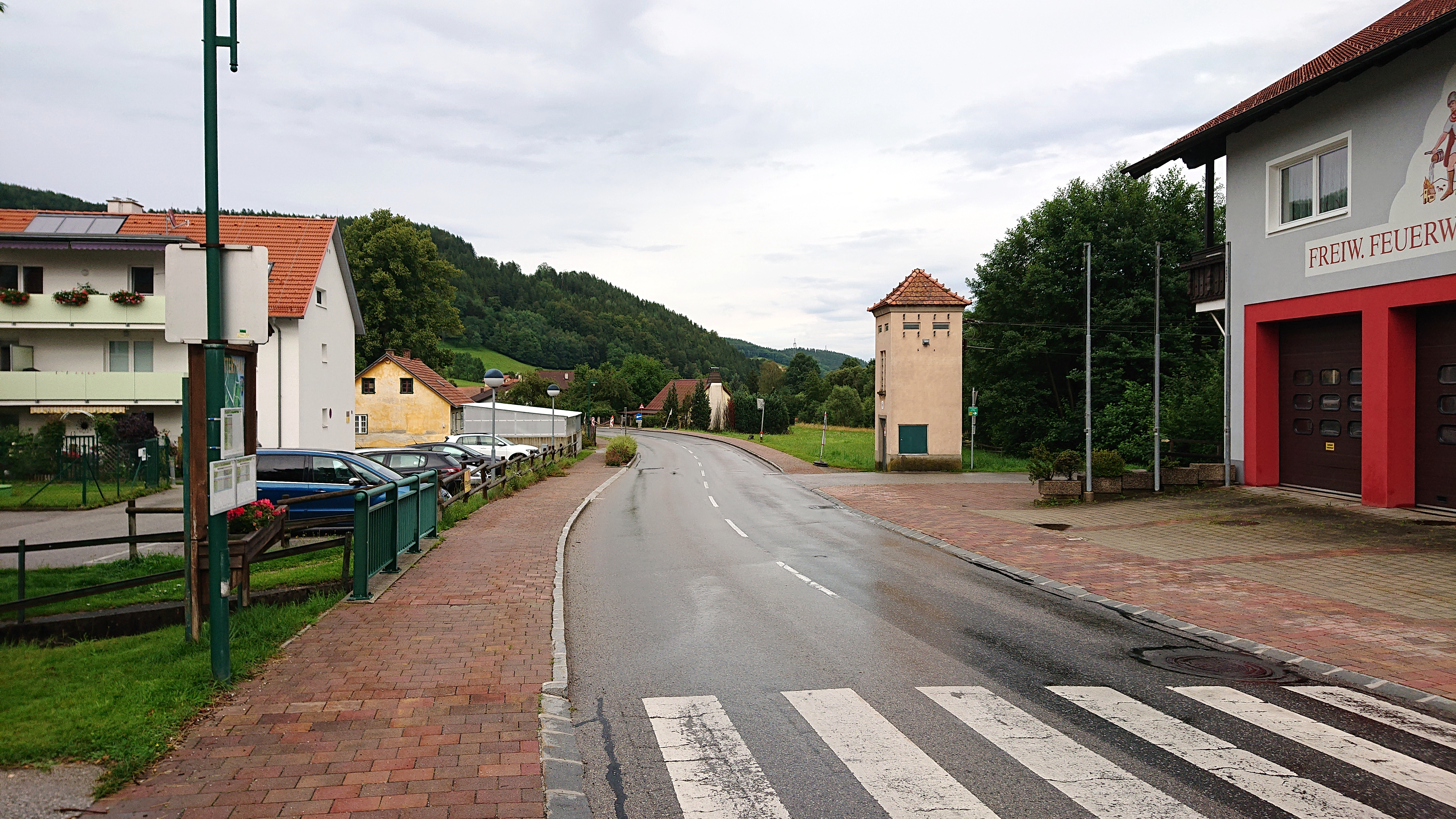
- Street in Otterthal

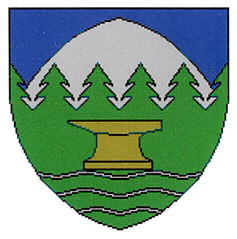
- Coat of arms

- Location within Austria
- Coordinates: 47°37′00″N 15°55′00″E
- Country: Austria
- State: Lower Austria
- District: Neunkirchen

Government
  - Mayor: Karl Mayerhofer (ÖVP)

Area
  - Total: 6.18 km^{2} (2.39 sq mi)
- Elevation: 632 m (2,073 ft)

Population (2018-01-01)
  - Total: 592
  - Density: 95.8/km^{2} (248/sq mi)
- Time zone: UTC+1 (CET)
  - Summer (DST): UTC+2 (CEST)
- Postal code: 2880
- Area code: 02641
- Vehicle registration: NK
- Website: www.otterthal.at

Otterthal is a municipality in the Industrieviertel of Lower Austria, Austria. 61.72 percent of the municipality is forested. There are 25 agricultural companies. 266 persons are employed. The activity rate was 48.31%.

== Population ==
Historical population
Year	Pop.	±%
1971	453	—
1981	526	+16.1%
1991	628	+19.4%
2001	563	−10.4%
