= Trattenbach =

- Municipality
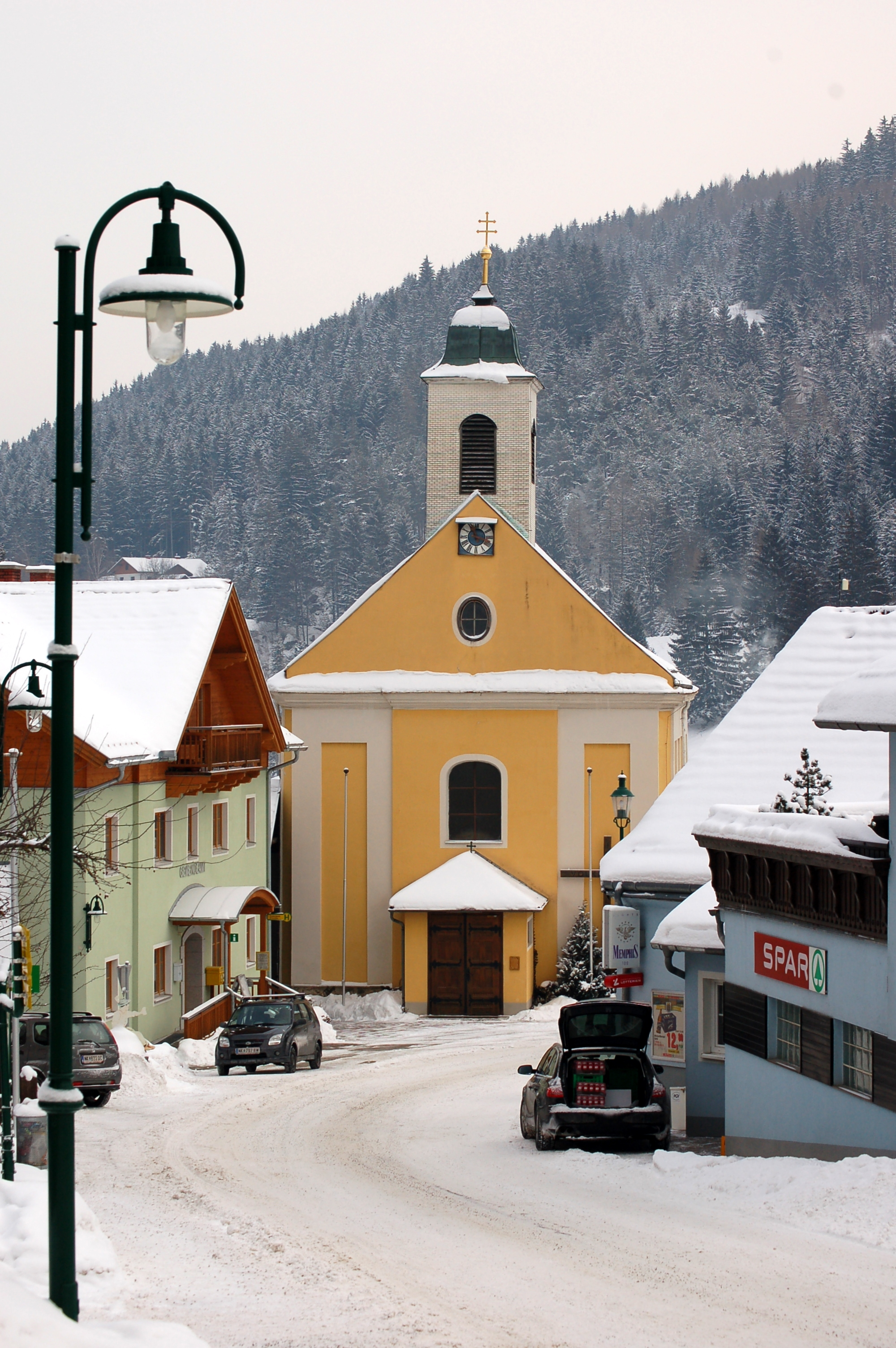
- Trattenbach parish church

- Coat of arms

- Location within Austria
- Coordinates: 47°36′00″N 15°52′00″E
- Country: Austria
- State: Lower Austria
- District: Neunkirchen

Government
  - Mayor: Ernst Schabauer (ÖVP)

Area
  - Total: 30.91 km^{2} (11.93 sq mi)
- Elevation: 777 m (2,549 ft)

Population (2018-01-01)
  - Total: 545
  - Density: 17.6/km^{2} (45.7/sq mi)
- Time zone: UTC+1 (CET)
  - Summer (DST): UTC+2 (CEST)
- Postal code: 2881
- Area code: 02641
- Vehicle registration: NK
- Website: www.tiscover.com/trattenbach

Trattenbach is a village in Austria, situated in Lower Austria. It is in the industrial part (Industrieviertel) of Lower Austria. The village's total area is 30.91 km^{2} (11.93 mi^{2}), of which 81.31% is forested.

From 1920 to 1922, the philosopher Ludwig Wittgenstein was an elementary teacher at the school in Trattenbach.

== Population ==
Historical population
Year	Pop.	±%
1971	716	—
1981	647	−9.6%
1991	718	+11.0%
2001	616	−14.2%
2012	538	−12.7%
2013	543	+0.9%

== Economy ==
There are 25 companies, 19 in 1991. 269 people are employed. The activity rate in 2001 was 44.96%. Historically Trattenbach was famous for its scythe and knife production, which did get exported worldwide.
