= Siegen-Wittgenstein =

Coordinates: 50°55′N 8°10′E

- District
- Flag Coat of arms
- Country: Germany
- State: North Rhine-Westphalia
- Adm. region: Arnsberg
- Capital: Siegen

Government
  - District admin.: Andreas Müller (SPD)

Area
  - Total: 1,131.47 km^{2} (436.86 sq mi)

Population (31 December 2023)
  - Total: 276,625
  - Density: 240/km^{2} (630/sq mi)
- Time zone: UTC+01:00 (CET)
  - Summer (DST): UTC+02:00 (CEST)
- Vehicle registration: BLB, SI
- Website: siegen-wittgenstein.de

Siegen-Wittgenstein is a Kreis (district) in the southeast of North Rhine-Westphalia, Germany. Neighboring districts are Olpe, Hochsauerlandkreis, Waldeck-Frankenberg, Marburg-Biedenkopf, Lahn-Dill, Westerwaldkreis, and Altenkirchen.

== History ==
In 1816–1817, the two districts of Siegen and Wittgenstein were created as parts of the Prussian province of Westphalia. In 1974, the two districts were merged, and in 1984 the name Siegen-Wittgenstein was adopted.

== Geography ==
Geographically, it covers the hills southeast of the Sauerland hills, the Siegerland and Wittgensteiner Land.

== Coat of arms ==
The two upper sections show, to the right, the arms of the Dukes of Nassau, who founded Siegen, and to the left, those of the Counts of Sayn-Wittgenstein. At the bottom a miner's lamp and a coppicing hook are depicted, in reference to the mining and charcoal-burning history of the district.

== Towns and municipalities ==
Clickable map of towns and municipalities in the district

Towns

1. Bad Berleburg
2. Bad Laasphe
3. Freudenberg
4. Hilchenbach
5. Kreuztal
6. Netphen
7. Siegen

Municipalities

1. Burbach
2. Erndtebrück
3. Neunkirchen (Siegerland)
4. Wilnsdorf
