= Paul Wittgenstein =

Austrian-American pianist (1887–1961)

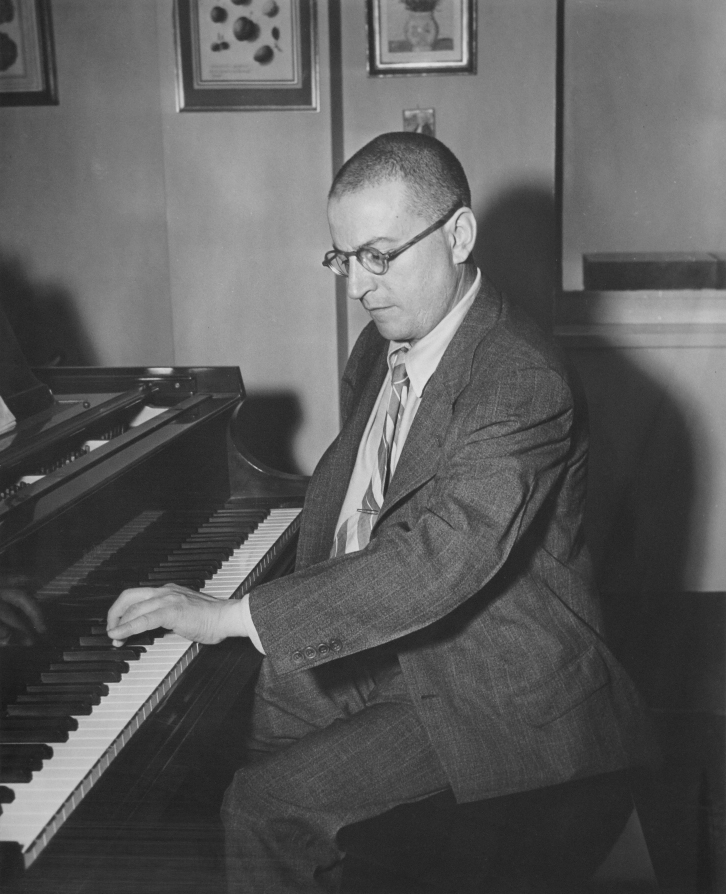
- Paul Wittgenstein playing the piano

Background information
- Born: November 5, 1887; Vienna, Austria-Hungary
- Died: March 3, 1961 (aged 73) New York City, US
- Occupation: Musician
- Instrument: Piano

Paul Wittgenstein (November 5, 1887 – March 3, 1961) was an Austrian-American concert pianist notable for commissioning new piano concerti for the left hand alone, after his right arm was amputated during World War I. He devised novel techniques, including pedal and hand-movement combinations, that allowed him to play chords previously thought impossible for a five-fingered pianist.

He was an older brother of the philosopher Ludwig Wittgenstein and a younger brother of Margaret Stonborough-Wittgenstein.

== Early life ==
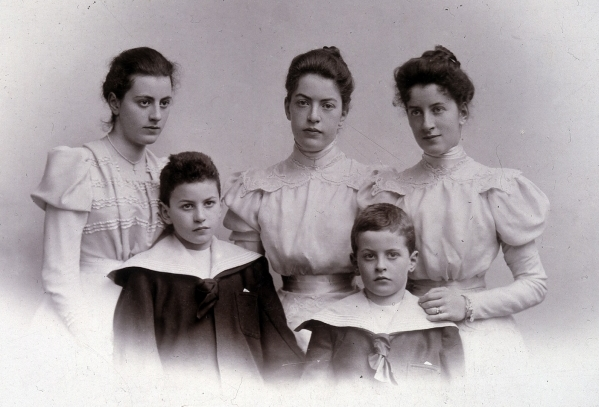
Paul Wittgenstein (front left) with his siblings.

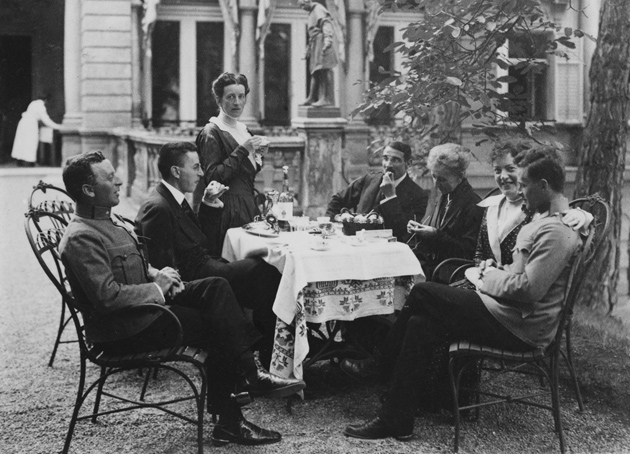
The Wittgenstein family, Vienna in mid 1917. From left, sibs Kurt, Paul, and Hermine Wittgenstein; brother-in-law, Max Salzer; mother, Leopoldine Wittgenstein; Helene Wittgenstein Salzer; and Ludwig Wittgenstein

Wittgenstein was born in Vienna, the fourth son and seventh of the eight children (excluding a daughter who died at birth) of industrialist Karl Wittgenstein and Leopoldine Maria Josefa Kalmus. He was raised as a Catholic; three of his grandparents had converted from Judaism as adults. Only his maternal grandmother had no Jewish lineage. His brother Ludwig was born two years later. The household was frequently visited by prominent cultural figures, among them the composers Johannes Brahms, Gustav Mahler, Josef Labor, and Richard Strauss, with whom the young Paul played duets. His grandmother, Fanny Wittgenstein, was a first cousin of the violinist Joseph Joachim, whom she adopted and took to Leipzig to study with Felix Mendelssohn.

Wittgenstein studied with Malvine Brée and later with the Polish virtuoso Theodor Leschetizky. He made his public début in 1913, attracting favorable reviews. The next year, World War I broke out, and he was called up for military service. He was shot in the elbow and captured by the Russians during the Battle of Galicia, and his right arm had to be amputated.

== New career as a left-handed pianist ==
During his recovery in a prisoner-of-war camp in Omsk in Siberia, Wittgenstein resolved to continue his career using only his left hand. Through the Danish Ambassador, he wrote to his old teacher Josef Labor, who was blind, asking for a concerto for the left hand. Labor responded quickly, saying he had already started work on a piece. After the war, Wittgenstein studied intensely, arranging pieces for the left hand alone and learning Labor's new composition. He began to perform again. Many reviews were qualified with comments that he played very well for a man with one arm, but he persevered.

He then approached more famous composers, asking them to write material for him to perform. Benjamin Britten, Paul Hindemith, Alexandre Tansman, Erich Wolfgang Korngold, Sergei Prokofiev, Karl Weigl, Franz Schmidt, Sergei Bortkiewicz, and Richard Strauss all produced pieces for him. Maurice Ravel wrote his Piano Concerto for the Left Hand, which became more famous than any of the other compositions Wittgenstein inspired. But when Wittgenstein made changes to the score for the première at the French embassy in Vienna—including "lines taken from the orchestral part and added to the solo, harmonies changed, parts added, bars cut and at the end a newly created series of great swirling arpeggios in the final cadenza"—Ravel became furious and did not speak to him for several years. Wittgenstein later agreed to perform the concerto as written, and the two men reconciled, but their friendship never fully recovered.

Wittgenstein did not perform every piece he commissioned. He told Prokofiev that he did not understand his 4th Piano Concerto but would someday play it; he never did. He later said, "Even a concerto Prokofiev has written for me I have not yet played because the inner logic of the work is not clear to me, and, of course I can't play it until it is." He rejected outright Hindemith's Piano Music with Orchestra Op. 29; he hid the score in his study, and it was not discovered until after his widow's death in 2002 (by which time Hindemith had been dead for 39 years). He could take this approach because he inserted into his contracts with composers the stipulation that he held the unique performing rights on a composition during his lifetime. As he told Siegfried Rapp on June 5, 1950:

You don't build a house just so that someone else can live in it. I commissioned and paid for the works, the whole idea was mine.... But those works to which I still have the exclusive performance rights are to remain mine as long as I still perform in public; that's only right and fair. Once I am dead or no longer give concerts, then the works will be available to everyone because I have no wish for them to gather dust in libraries to the detriment of the composer.

(Rapp premiered Prokofiev's 4th Piano Concerto in 1956, five years before Wittgenstein's death.)

Many of the pieces Wittgenstein commissioned are still performed today by two-armed pianists; in particular, the Austrian pianist Friedrich Wührer, claiming the composer's sanction but apparently over Wittgenstein's objections, created two-hand arrangements of Schmidt's Wittgenstein-inspired left-hand works. Pianists born after Wittgenstein who lost the use of their right hands, such as Leon Fleisher (although he eventually recovered his right hand's abilities) and João Carlos Martins, also played works composed for him.

Wittgenstein's posthumous reputation is mixed. In The House of Wittgenstein: A Family at War, Alexander Waugh writes that between 1928 and 1934, Wittgenstein was "a world-class pianist of outstanding technical ability and sensitivity" but that his playing grew increasingly "harsh and ham-fisted". Orchestras and conductors that had invited him once seldom sought to rebook him. His tendency to alter and rewrite, without authorization, the works he commissioned has also contributed to his controversial status.

== Nazi persecution and emigration ==
The Wittgenstein family converted to Christianity three generations before Paul's birth on the paternal side and two generations before on the maternal side, but they were of mainly Jewish descent, and under the Nuremberg laws they were classed as Jews. After the rise of the Nazi Party and the annexation of Austria, Paul tried to persuade his sisters Hermine and Helene (aged 69 and 64 at the time) to leave Vienna, but they demurred: they were attached to their homes there, and could not believe such a distinguished family as theirs was in real danger. Ludwig had already been living in England for some years, and Margaret (Gretl) was married to an American. Paul, who was no longer permitted to perform in public under the Nazis, moved to the U.S. in 1938. From there, he and Gretl, with some assistance from Ludwig (who acquired British nationality in 1939), managed to use family finances (mostly held abroad) and legal connections to attain non-Jewish status for their sisters.

The family's financial portfolio consisted of properties and other assets in Germany and occupied lands with a total value of about $6 billion, possibly the largest private fortune in Europe. Essentially all family assets were surrendered to the Nazis in return for protection afforded the two sisters under exceptional interpretations of racial laws, allowing them to continue to live in their family palace in Vienna.

== Personal life ==
Wittgenstein's wife, Hilde, had been his pupil; they had two children before their marriage, the first conceived after the first piano lesson, when Hilde was 18 and Paul 47. Because Hilde was not Jewish, Paul was open to charges of "racial defilement"; in 1938 he fled to New York. In 1940, he spent seven months in Cuba, attempting to secure permanent visas for Hilde and himself, and they married in a Catholic ceremony in Havana on 20 August 1940. When his wife and children arrived in the U.S. in 1941, he set them up in a house on Long Island, which he visited at weekends from his apartment on Riverside Drive. Wittgenstein became a U.S. citizen in 1946 and spent the rest of his life in the U.S., where he did much teaching as well as playing. He died in New York City in 1961 and was buried on Long Island, but later disinterred and reburied in Pinegrove Cemetery, South Sterling, Pike County, Pennsylvania, where his widow had moved.

== Art collector ==
Wittgenstein collected works by artists of the Vienna Secession, especially Gustav Klimt. He owned several works by Rudolf von Alt and a painting by Monet currently in the Harvard Art Museums. He also had a large collection of music and musical instruments.

== In popular culture ==
John Barchilon wrote a novel, The Crown Prince, based on Wittgenstein's life.

An episode of the long-running American television series M*A*S*H, "Morale Victory", featured James Stephens as a drafted concert pianist with debilitating nerve damage in his right hand after being wounded in combat. Charles Winchester (David Ogden Stiers) provides him with the music for Ravel's Concerto for the Left Hand, tells him Wittgenstein's story, and encourages him not to abandon his musical gift.

Wittgenstein appears as a character in Derek Jarman's 1993 film Wittgenstein, about his brother Ludwig.

Wittgenstein is referenced extensively in the latter half of Brian Evenson's novel Last Days.

Wittgenstein's life is the basis for the song "Wittgenstein's Arm" on Neil Halstead's 2012 album Palindrome Hunches.

William Boyd's short story "Transfigured Night" (found in the collections The Dream Lover and The Destiny of Natalie 'X') features Wittgenstein.
