= Oets Kolk Bouwsma =

American analytic philosopher (1898–1978)

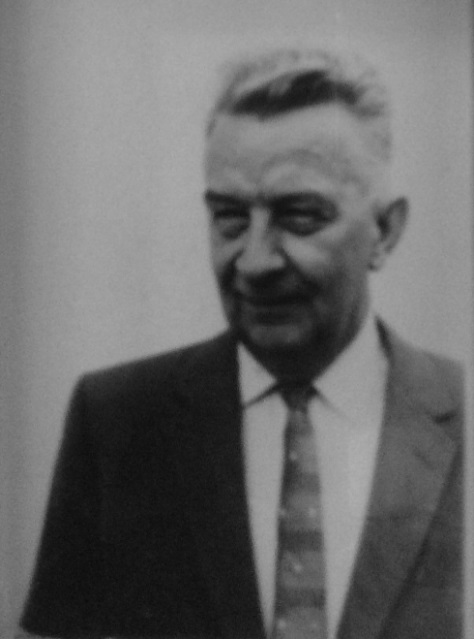
- Bouwsma in his later years
- Born: November 22, 1898; Muskegon, Michigan, U.S.
- Died: March 1, 1978 (aged 79); Austin, Texas, U.S.

Education
- Education: Calvin College; University of Michigan

Philosophical work
- Era: 20th-century philosophy
- Region: Western philosophy
- School: Analytic philosophy
- Institutions: University of Nebraska
- Notable students: Morris Lazerowitz
- Main interests: Philosophy of language, epistemology, Christian existentialism
- Notable ideas: Critique of Cartesian skepticism

Oets Kolk Bouwsma (/ˈbaʊzmə/; November 22, 1898 – March 1, 1978) was an American analytic philosopher.

== Education and early career ==
O. K. Bouwsma (as he was usually known) was born on November 22, 1898 in Muskegon, Michigan, to Dutch-born Americans Joachum Everts Bouwsma and Hillegian Kolk Bouwsma. His parents maintained close ties to the Netherlands and the Dutch-American communities of western Michigan. Bouwsma was raised within the Calvinist Christian Reformed Church (a denomination with roots in the Dutch Reformed Church) with Dutch as the household's language of biblical reading and mealtime prayers. Craft and Hustwit report that he was "a devoted reader of Scriptures, and a lifelong lover of the reformed church". Richard Mouw records how Bouwsma "kept faith with his upbringing" and "maintained fierce loyalties" to the church throughout his life.

Bouwsma completed the then 3 year course of studies offered at the then Calvin College in 1919 (and served, during World War I, as a member of its Student Army Training Corps). From the University of Michigan, he obtained an AB in 1920, MA in 1922, and, with a dissertation "On Difference in the Criterion of F.H. Bradley", his PhD in 1928. While a graduate student, Bouwsma worked as an Instructor in English at the university (1922–1928). He was appointed Assistant Professor at the University of Nebraska in 1928, where he was promoted to Associate Professor and then Professor of Philosophy, remaining on the faculty until his mandatory retirement.

An advocate of idealism in his earlier years, Bouwsma became more inclined toward G. E. Moore's common sense counters to skepticism. Nonetheless, he was critical of Moore and developed his own technique of analysis, focusing on uncovering the hidden analogies that drove Moore's ways of speaking about sense data. He worked intensely on Moore, publishing a significant paper, "Moore’s Theory of Sense-Data", finally included in the 1942 Library of Living Philosophers volume on him. The essay reflected the beginnings of a method of philosophical analysis that was soon to be forged by his reading of Ludwig Wittgenstein.

In 1923, his son, the historian William J. Bouwsma, was born.

== Later career ==
With a fine ear for expression, Bouwsma fastened on poetry, James Joyce’s Ulysses and Finnegans Wake, Shakespeare, Dickens, and novelists who artistically capture the expressions of ordinary language. In this regard he reflected often on the writing and reading of literature. He wrote and lectured on the “truth” of poetry, emphasizing its aesthetic value as opposed to its moral value. He also wrote on the puzzling relationship of words to music in “The Expression Theory of Art.” Extensive marginal notes filling his copies of Ulysses and Finnegans Wake indicate how consumed he was by Joyce's word play and how he appropriated a sensitivity to word play in his own writing style.

Engaged in Moore's philosophy, Bouwsma sent students from the University of Nebraska, most notably Morris Lazerowitz, to study with Moore at Cambridge. Lazerowitz's wife Alice Ambrose, a student of Wittgenstein as well as Moore, introduced Bouwsma to Wittgenstein's revolutionary ideas in The Blue Book. Norman Malcolm, another of Bouwsma's students, became a prominent interpreter and presenter of Wittgenstein's ideas in America, after studying with Wittgenstein at Cambridge. Malcolm, who later taught at Cornell, was able to persuade Wittgenstein to visit there. Simultaneously, Malcolm arranged for Bouwsma to teach at Cornell during Wittgenstein's visit. By that time, in 1949, Bouwsma had absorbed the implications of Wittgenstein's philosophy in The Blue Book. With a leave from the University of Nebraska and a Fulbright Fellowship, he was able to spend much of the next two years discussing philosophy with Wittgenstein at Cornell, Smith College, and Oxford. Through Wittgenstein, Bouwsma developed an understanding of what he had been groping for in his work on Moore.

After the personal influence of Wittgenstein and much hard work on The Blue Book and Philosophical Investigations, Bouwsma emerged with a unique method of philosophical analysis that he applied to a variety of philosophical problems. He continued to attack Cartesian skepticism that reflected the idealism from which Bouwsma fought to free himself. Applying Wittgenstein's radical turn of displaying the nonsense in place of refuting a philosophical theory, he turned to Berkeley's idealism where he teased the failure to make sense of ideas as entities in the mind out into the open. With a focus on the opening question of The Blue Book on meaning, he wrote tirelessly on the idea of "meaning as use," until he shook himself loose of the notion that Wittgenstein was presenting another philosophical theory of meaning. He came to understand and appropriate the idea that Wittgenstein had developed a set of techniques to arm the philosopher in the struggle against the “bewitchment of his intelligence by means of language.” This understanding culminated in Bouwsma's accomplished article, The Blue Book, which described the aims of the new method of philosophical analysis. With such perennial conceptually puzzling concepts as “time,” “truth,” and “thinking,” he carefully and often humorously compared sentences of philosophers with actual sentences of daily life – earning Bouwsma a notable place in what came to be called “ordinary language philosophy.” With this reputation, Gilbert Ryle asked Bouwsma to deliver the first of the famous John Locke Lectures at Oxford University.

With a lifelong attachment to the Christian Reformed Church, Bouwsma philosophically engaged the concepts of Christianity. Applying his acquired techniques of philosophical analysis, he carefully distinguished the uses of the word “belief” in religious settings from uses in non-religious settings. When called upon in philosophy to illuminate puzzling Christian concepts, he drew on his lifelong participation in the community of faith and on his reading of the Scriptures to dramatically bring to life their meaning. In addition to Wittgenstein, his work on Kierkegaard was the other great influence in Bouwsma's philosophical development. He came to understand the significance of Kierkegaard’s concept of “subjectivity” for thinking philosophically about Christianity. On the one hand, “subjectivity” points to understanding the language of religion in the context of particular religious communities – an idea parallel to Wittgenstein's idea of understanding words and sentences in language-games and forms of life. On the other hand, “subjectivity” makes clear that Christianity is an invitation to new life and not an objective system of metaphysics. His papers in the philosophy of religion are collected separately in a volume with the title, Without Proof or Evidence, published by the University of Nebraska Press.

Bouwsma was President of the Western Division of the American Philosophical Association from 1957–58.

Bouwsma taught philosophy at the University of Nebraska from 1928 until 1965 and the University of Texas from 1965 until 1977. His greatest influence came, not so much through his humorously and finely written essays, but through the many graduate students he trained in his unique style of exploring the borderlands of sense and nonsense in philosophical sentences. Although he wrote incessantly and presented numerous papers, he published only one book toward the end of his career – a collection of essays titled Philosophical Essays. He died in 1978 in Austin, Texas. His papers and daily notebooks, the latter filling hundreds of legal pads, are housed in the Harry Ransom Humanities Research Center at The University of Texas, Austin. J.L. Craft and Ronald E. Hustwit Sr. co-edited and published two additional volumes of his papers and selections of his commonplace book. His notebooks recording his discussions with Wittgenstein, published with the title, Wittgenstein Conversations, 1949–51, have become a primary source for Wittgenstein studies.

In 1975 he received an honorary doctorate in Humane Letters from the University of Nebraska.

== Publications ==
=== Books ===
- Philosophical Essays. University of Nebraska Press, 1965.

The following works, collected and edited by J.L. Craft and R.E. Hustwit Sr., were published posthumously:

- Toward a New Sensibility: Essays of O.K. Bouwsma. University of Nebraska Press, 1982.
- Without Proof or Evidence: Essays of O.K. Bouwsma. University of Nebraska Press, 1984.
- Wittgenstein Conversations, 1949–1951. Hackett Publishing, 1986.
- Bouwsma’s Notes on Wittgenstein’s Philosophy, 1965–1975. Edwin Mellen Press, 1995.
- O.K. Bouwsma’s Commonplace Book – Remarks on Philosophy and Education. Edwin Mellen Press, 1999.

=== Select papers and book chapters ===
- “Moore’s Theory of Sense-Data,” in The Philosophy of G. E. Moore, ed. Paul Schilpp (Evanston, Ill., 1942), pp. 203–221. reprinted in Philosophical Essays
- “Russell’s Argument on Universals,” Philosophical Review 52 (1943): 193–199. JSTOR 2180585
- “Descartes’ Skepticism of the Senses,” Mind 54 (1945): 313–332. reprinted in Dunlop, Charles E. M., ed. (1977). Philosophical essays on dreaming.
- “Naturalism” Journal of Philosophy 45 (1948): 12–21. JSTOR 2019709
- “Descartes’ Evil Genius,” Philosophical Review 58 (1949): 141–151. JSTOR 2181388 reprinted in Philosophical Essays
- “The Expression Theory of Art.” in Philosophical Analysis: A Collection of Essays. ed. Max Black. New Jersey: Prentice Hall, 1950
- “The Mystery of Time.” Journal of Philosophy 51 (1954): 341–362.JSTOR 2020630
- “Reflections on Moore’s Recent Book” Philosophical Review 64 (1955): 248–263. JSTOR 2182590 reprinted in Philosophical Essays
- “On Many Occasions I Have In Sleep Been Deceived.” Proceedings and Addresses Of The American Philosophical Association, Oct. 1957
- “The Blue Book,” Journal of Philosophy 58 (1961): 141–161 JSTOR 2023409 reprinted in Philosophical Essays
- “Double Talk, Jackie Vernon, and X.”, “Anselm's Argument.”, “I Think I Am.” in The Nature of Philosophical Inquiry. ed. Joseph Bobik. Notre Dame, Ind.: University of Notre Dame Press, 1970:
- "Adventure in Verification" Orlebeke, Clifton; Smedes, Lewis B., eds. (1975). God and the good: essays in honor of Henry Stob. Grand Rapids: Eerdmans. pp. 107–121, reprinted in Without Proof or Evidence

For more complete publication details see Annotated Bibliography on O.K. Bouwsma Collection (2009) by Ronald E. Hustwit Sr.

== See also ==
- American philosophy
- List of American philosophers
