= Simon Mayer =

Simon Mayer may be an alternate spelling of:

- Simon Marius (1573–1624), German astronomer
- Johann Simon Mayr (1763-1845), German composer
