= Giacomo Badoer =

Giacomo Badoer may refer to:

- Giacomo Badoer (born 1403), Venetian merchant
- Giacomo Badoer (died 1537), Venetian administrator
- Giacomo Badoer (French diplomat) (c. 1575 – c. 1620)
- Giacomo Badoaro (1602–1654), Venetian poet
