= Paolo Sarpi =

Venetian Servite friar, historian, statesman and scientist (1552–1623)

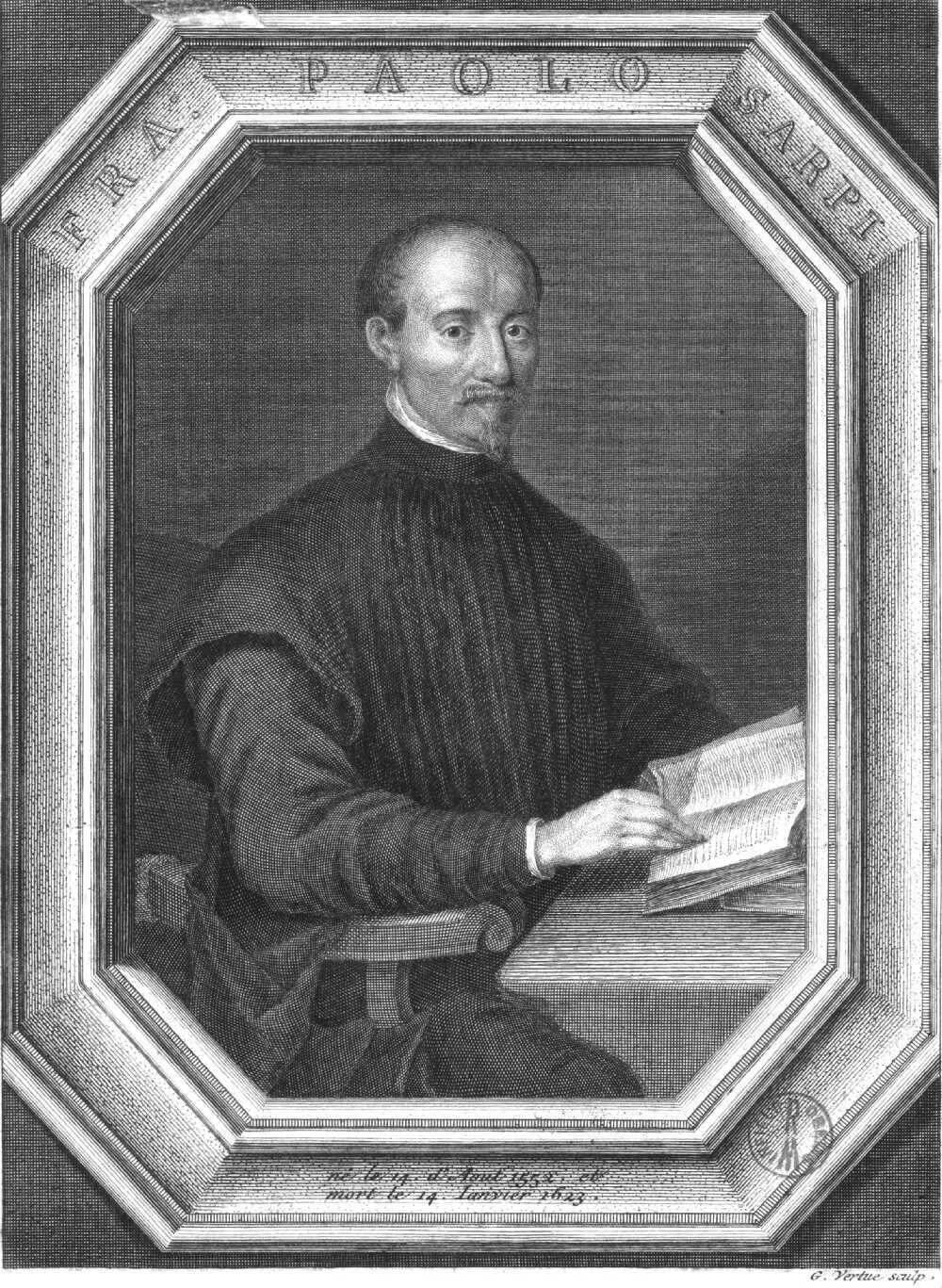
Engraving of Fra Paolo Sarpi by George Vertue (1684–1756)

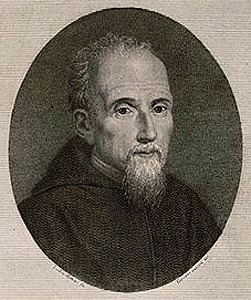
Paolo Sarpi, Calcografia Bettoni, Milan, 1824

Paolo Sarpi, O.S.M. (14 August 1552 – 15 January 1623) was an Italian Servite friar and Catholic priest who was a notable historian, scientist, canon lawyer, polymath, and statesman active on behalf of the Venetian Republic during the period of its successful defiance of the papal interdict (1605–1607) and its war (1615–1617) with Austria over the Uskok pirates. His writings, frankly polemical and highly critical of the Catholic Church and its Scholastic tradition, "inspired both Hobbes and Edward Gibbon in their own historical debunkings of priestcraft." Sarpi's major work, the History of the Council of Trent (1619), was published in London in 1619; other works: a History of Ecclesiastical Benefices, History of the Interdict and his Supplement to the History of the Uskoks, appeared posthumously. Organized around single topics, they are early examples of the genre of the historical monograph.

As a defender of the liberties of Republican Venice and proponent of the separation of Church and state, Sarpi attained fame as a hero of republicanism and free thought and possible crypto Protestant. His last words, "Esto perpetua" ("may she [i.e., the republic] live forever"), were recalled by John Adams in 1820 in a letter to Thomas Jefferson, when Adams "wished 'as devoutly as Father Paul for the preservation of our vast American empire and our free institutions', as Sarpi had wished for the preservation of Venice and its institutions."

Sarpi was also an experimental scientist, a proponent of the Copernican system, a friend and patron of Galileo Galilei, and a keen follower of the latest research on anatomy, astronomy, and ballistics at the University of Padua. His extensive network of correspondents included Francis Bacon and William Harvey.

Sarpi believed that government institutions should rescind their censorship of the Avvisi—the newsletters that started to be common in his time—and instead of censorship, publish their own versions of the news to counter enemy publications. In that spirit, Sarpi himself published several pamphlets in defence of Venice's rights over the Adriatic. As such, Sarpi could be considered as an early advocate of the freedom of the press, though the concept did not yet exist in his lifetime.

== Early years ==
He was born Pietro Sarpi in Venice on 14 August 1552. His father was a merchant, although not a successful one; his mother was a Venetian noblewoman. His father died while he was still a child. The brilliant and precocious boy was educated by his maternal uncle, a school teacher, and then by Giammaria Capella, a friar of the Servite Order. In 1566, at the age of thirteen, he also entered the Order, later being given the religious name of Fra (Brother) Paolo, by which, with the epithet Servita, he was always known to his contemporaries.

Sarpi was assigned to a monastery in Mantua around 1567. In 1570, he sustained theses at a disputation there, and was invited to remain as court theologian to Duke Guglielmo Gonzaga. Sarpi remained four years at Mantua, studying mathematics and oriental languages. He then went to Milan in 1575, where he was an adviser to Charles Borromeo, the saint and bishop but was transferred by his superiors to Venice, to serve as a professor of philosophy at the Servite monastery there. In 1579, he was elected as Prior Provincial of the Venetian Province of the Servite Order, while studying at the University of Padua. Simultaneously he was appointed to serve as the Procurator General for the Order. In this capacity, he was sent to Rome, where he interacted with three successive popes, the grand inquisitor, and other influential people.

Sarpi returned to Venice in 1588 and passed the next 17 years in study, occasionally interrupted by the internal disputes of his community. In 1601, he was recommended by the Venetian senate for the bishopric of Caorle, but the papal nuncio, who wished to obtain it for a protégé of his own, accused Sarpi of having denied the immortality of the soul and controverted the authority of Aristotle. An attempt to obtain another bishopric in the following year also failed, Pope Clement VIII having taken offence at Sarpi's habit of corresponding with learned heretics.

== Venice in conflict with the Pope ==
Clement VIII died in March 1605, and the attitude of his successor Pope Paul V strained the limits of papal prerogative. Venice simultaneously adopted measures to restrict it: the right of the secular tribunals to take cognizance of the offences of ecclesiastics had been asserted in two leading cases and the scope of two ancient laws of the city, that were: one forbidding the foundation of new churches or ecclesiastical congregations without the consent of the state, the other forbidding acquisition of property by priests or religious bodies. These laws had been extended over the entire territory of the republic. In January 1606, the papal nuncio delivered a brief demanding the unconditional submission of the Venetians. The senate promised protection to all ecclesiastics who should in this emergency aid the republic by their counsel. Sarpi presented a memoir, pointing out that the threatened censures might be met in two ways – de facto, by prohibiting their publication, and de jure, by an appeal to a general council. The document was well received, and Sarpi was made canonist and theological counsellor to the republic.

The following April, hopes of compromise were dispelled by Paul's excommunication of the Venetians and his attempt to lay their dominions under an interdict. Sarpi entered energetically into the controversy. It was unprecedented for an ecclesiastic of his eminence to argue the subjection of the clergy to the state. He began by republishing the anti-papal opinions of the canonist Jean Gerson (1363–1429). In an anonymous tract published shortly afterwards (Risposta di un Dottore in Teologia), he laid down principles which struck radically at papal authority in secular matters. This book was promptly included in the Index Librorum Prohibitorum — a compilation of books banned by the Catholic church — and Cardinal Bellarmine attacked Gerson's work with severity. Sarpi then replied in an Apologia. The Considerazioni sulle censure and the Trattato dell' interdetto, the latter partly prepared under his direction by other theologians, soon followed. Numerous other pamphlets appeared, inspired or controlled by Sarpi, who had received the further appointment of censor of everything written at Venice in defence of the republic.

Following Sarpi's advice, the Venetian clergy largely disregarded the interdict and discharged their functions as usual, the major exception being the Jesuits, who left on their own accord, but were simultaneously declared expelled by law. The Catholic powers France and Spain refused to be drawn into the quarrel and resorted to diplomacy. At length (April 1607), the mediation of King Henry IV of France arranged a compromise which salvaged the pope's dignity but conceded the points at issue. The two priests were returned to Rome but with Venice reserving the right to try clergy in civil courts. The outcome proved not so much the defeat of papal pretensions as the recognition that interdicts and excommunication had lost their force. "The Republic," said Sarpi, "has given a shake to papal claims. For whoever heard till now of a papal interdict, published with all solemnity, ending in smoke?"

== Assassination attempt ==
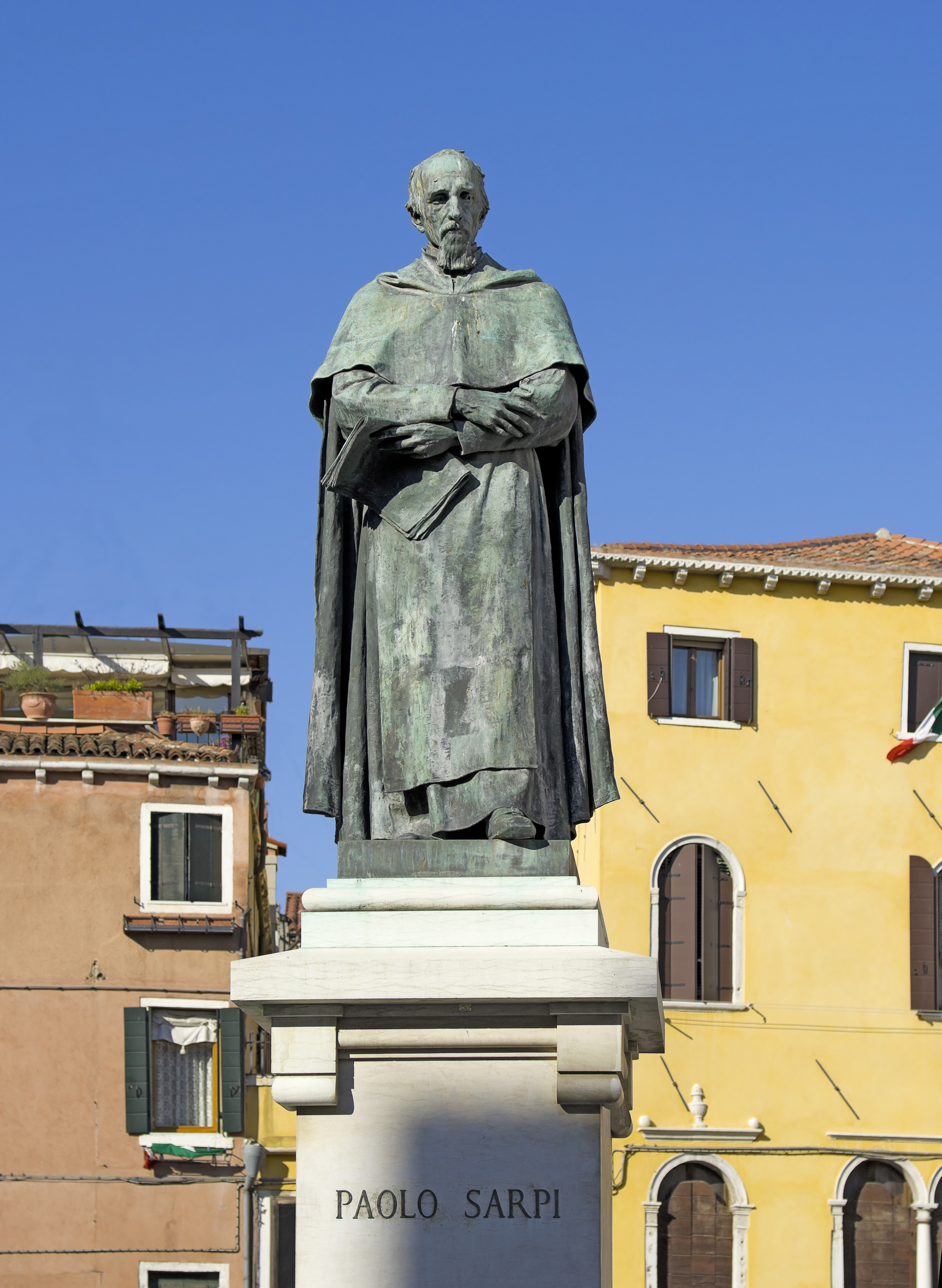
Statue of Paolo Sarpi, Campo Santa Fosca, Venice, near the place where he was stabbed by the pope's assassins

The republic rewarded Sarpi with the distinction of State Counsellor in Jurisprudence and the liberty of access to the state archives. These honours exasperated his adversaries, particularly Pope Paul V. In September 1607, at the instigation of the pope and his Cardinal-nephew, Scipio Borghese, Fra Sarpi became the target of an assassination attempt. A defrocked friar and brigand by the name of Rotilio Orlandini, assisted by his two brothers-in-law, agreed to kill Sarpi for the sum of 8,000 crowns. However, Orlandini's plot was discovered, and when the three assassins crossed from Papal into Venetian territory they were arrested and imprisoned.

On 5 October 1607, Sarpi was attacked by assassins and left for dead with three stiletto thrusts, but he recovered. His attackers found both refuge and a welcome reception in the papal territories (described by a contemporary as a "triumphal march"), and papal enthusiasm for the assassins cooled only after learning that Brother Sarpi was not dead after all. The leader of the assassins, Poma, declared that he had attempted the murder for religious reasons. Sarpi himself, when his surgeon commented on the ragged and inartistic character of the wounds, responded, "Agnosco stylum Romanae Curiae" ("I recognize the style of the Roman Curia"). Sarpi's would-be assassins settled in Rome, and were eventually granted a pension by the viceroy of Naples, Pedro Téllez-Girón, 3rd Duke of Osuna.

== Later life ==
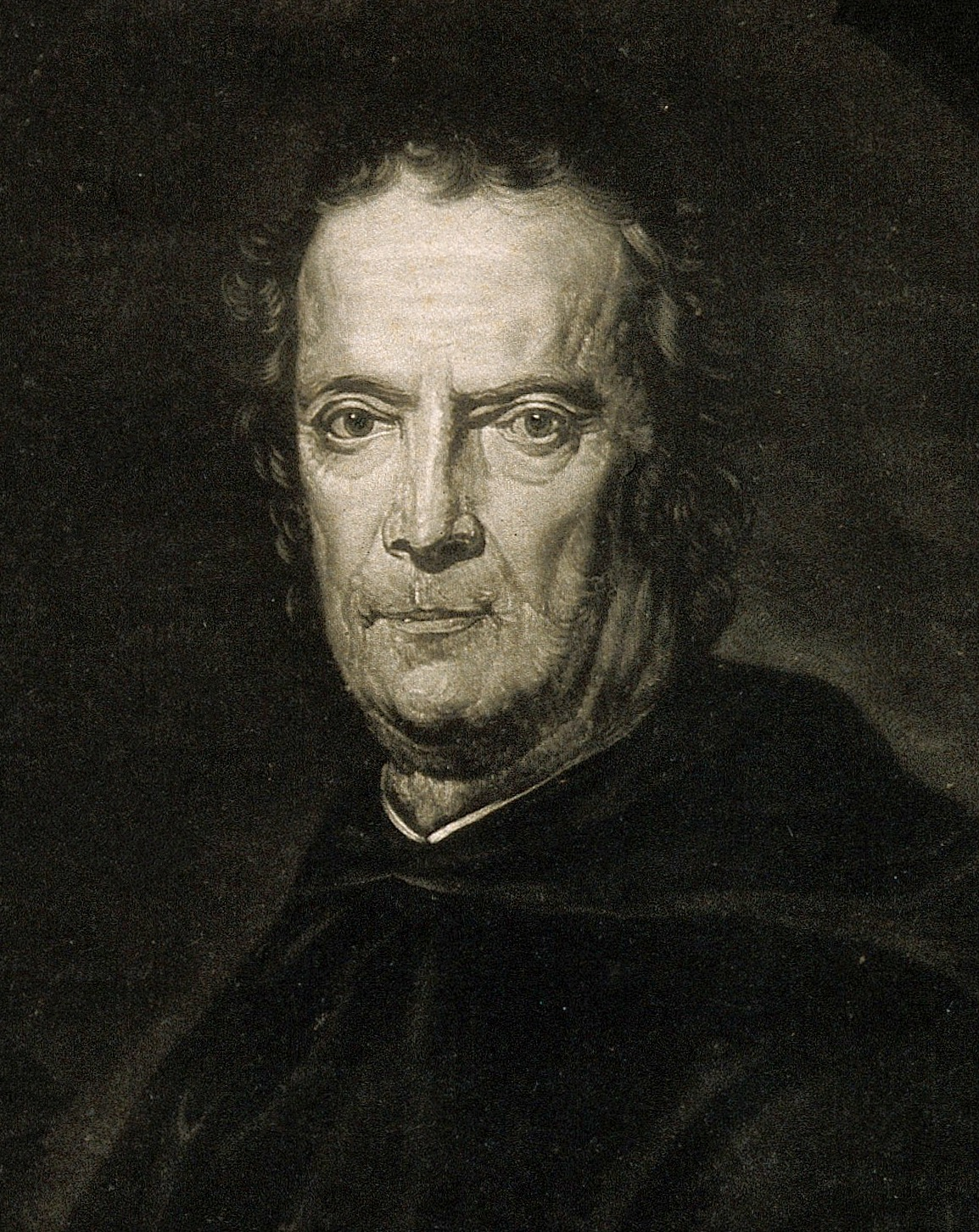
Paolo Sarpi, 1777, attributed to engraver William Dickinson

The remainder of Sarpi's life was spent peacefully in his cloister, though plots against him continued to be formed, and he occasionally spoke of taking refuge in England. When not engaged in preparing state papers, he devoted himself to scientific studies, and composed several works. He served the state to the last. The day before his death, he had dictated three replies to questions on affairs of the Venetian Republic, and his last words were "Esto perpetua," or "may she endure forever."

These words were adopted as the state motto of Idaho and appear on the back of the 2007 Idaho quarter, as well as being taken up by various other groups and bodies in different countries (see "Esto perpetua").

== History of the Council of Trent ==
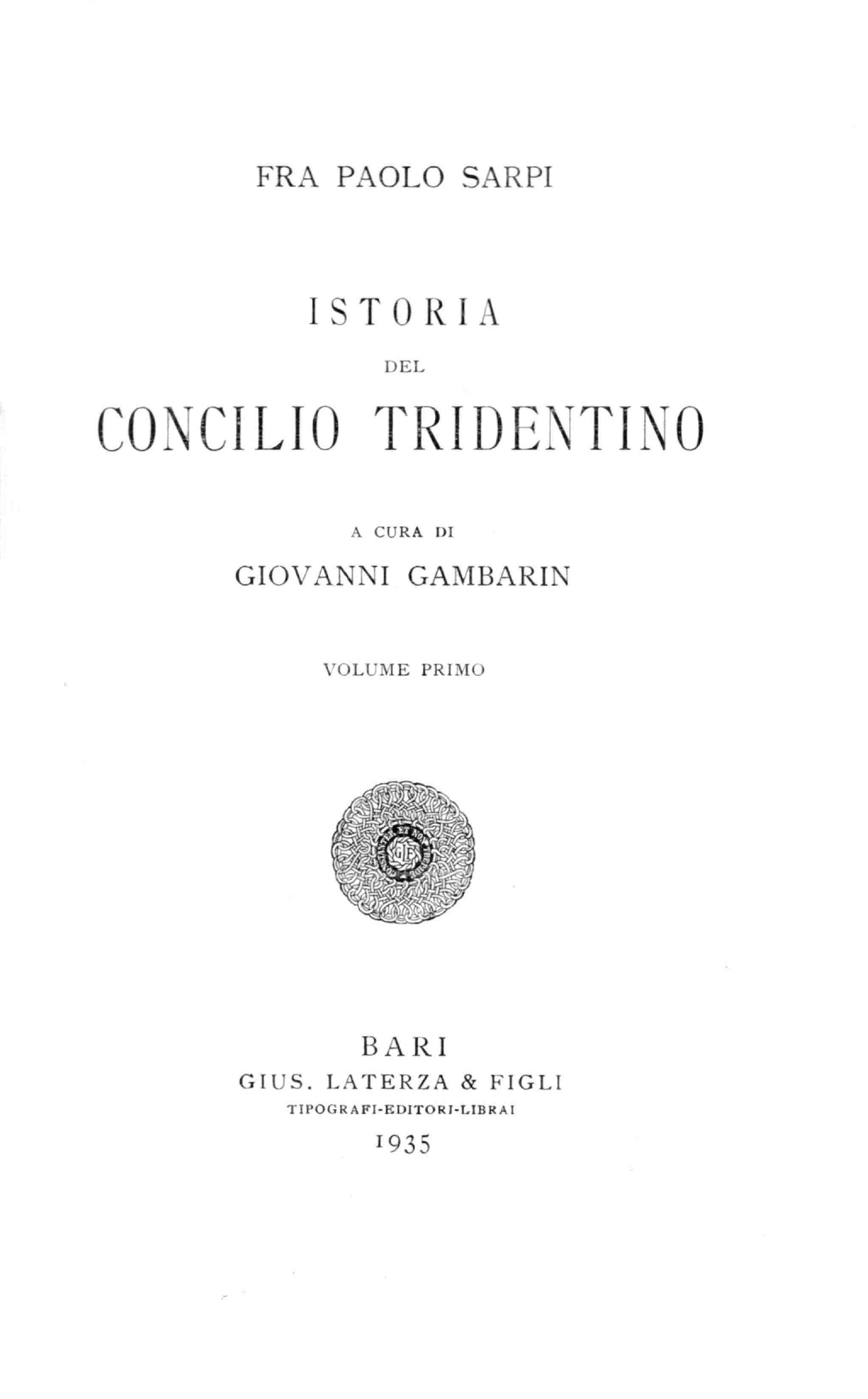
Istoria del Concilio tridentino, 1935

In 1619, his chief literary work, Istoria del Concilio Tridentino (History of the Council of Trent), was printed in London, published under the name of Pietro Soave Polano, an anagram of Paolo Sarpi Veneto (plus o). The editor, Marco Antonio de Dominis (later declared a manifest heretic by the Holy Inquisition), did some work on polishing the text. He has been accused of falsifying it, but a comparison with a manuscript corrected by Sarpi himself shows that the alterations are unimportant. Translations into other languages followed: there was the English translation by Nathaniel Brent and a Latin edition in 1620 made by Adam Newton, de Dominis, and William Bedell, and French and German editions.

Its emphasis was on the role of the Papal Curia, and its slant on the Curia hostile. This was unofficial history, rather than a commission, and treated ecclesiastical history as politics. Sarpi in Mantua had known Camillo Olivo, secretary to Cardinal Ercole Gonzaga. His attitude, "bitterly realistic" for John Hale, was coupled with a criticism that the Tridentine settlement was not conciliatory but designed for further conflict. Denys Hay calls it "a kind of Anglican picture of the debates and decisions", and Sarpi was much read by Protestants; John Milton called him the "great unmasker". His eulogy, however, issued more from antipapal and anticlerical attitudes than from true admiration for Sarpi's style and acumen. Catholic scholars like Jacques-Benigne Bossuet considered Sarpi a worthless historian, a view largely shared by more recent historiography.

Sarpi's work attained such fame that the Vatican opened its archives to Cardinal Francesco Sforza Pallavicino, whom it commissioned to write a three-volume rebuttal, entitled the Istoria del Concilio di Trento, scritta dal P. Sforza Pallavicino, della Comp. di Giesù ove insieme rifiutasi con auterevoli testimonianze un Istoria falsa divolgata nello stesso argomento sotto nome di Petro Soave Polano ("The History of the Council of Trent written by P. Sforza Pallavicino, of the Company of Jesus, in which a false history upon the same argument put forth under the name of Petro Soave Polano is refuted by means of authoritative testimony", 1656–1657). The great nineteenth century historian Leopold von Ranke (History of the Popes), examined both Sarpi and Pallavicino's treatments of manuscript materials and judged them both as falling short of his own strict standards of objectivity. The former is described as moved by deadly hatred – malignant in his purpose and reckless in his means – fabricating falsehoods and distorting or perverting truths; while the Jesuit, though scrupulously correct in the documents he exhibits, often suppresses those opposed to his views. Nevertheless, Ranke rated the quality of Sarpi's work very highly, considering him superior to Guicciardini. Sarpi never acknowledged his authorship, and baffled all the efforts of Louis II de Bourbon, Prince de Condé to extract the secret from him.

Hubert Jedin's multi-volume history of the Council of Trent (1961), also Vatican-authorized, likewise faults Sarpi's use of sources. David Wootton believes, however, that there is evidence Sarpi may have used original documents that have not survived and he calls Sarpi's treatment of Council quite careful despite its partisan framing.

== Other works ==
In 1615, a dispute occurred between the Venetian government and the Inquisition over the prohibition of a book. In 1613 the Senate had asked Sarpi to write about the history and procedure of the Venetian Inquisition. He argued that this had been set up in 1289, but as a Venetian state institution. The pope of the time, Nicholas IV, had merely consented to its creation. This work appeared in English translation by Robert Gentilis in 1639.

A Machiavellian tract on the fundamental maxims of Venetian policy (Opinione come debba governarsi la repubblica di Venezia) has been attributed to Sarpi and used by some of his posthumous adversaries to blacken his memory, but it in fact dates from 1681. He did not complete a reply which he had been ordered to prepare to the Squitinio della libertà veneta (1612, attributed to Alfonso de la Cueva), which he perhaps found unanswerable. In folio appeared his History of Ecclesiastical Benefices, in which, said Matteo Ricci, "he purged the church of the defilement introduced by spurious decretals." It appeared in English translation in 1736 with a biography by John Lockman. In 1611, he attacked misuse of the right of asylum claimed for churches, in a work that was immediately placed on the Index.

His posthumous History of the Interdict was printed at Venice the year after his death, with the disguised imprint of Lyon. Sarpi's memoirs on state affairs remained in the Venetian archives. Consul Smith's collection of tracts in the Interdict controversy went to the British Museum. Francesco Griselini's Memorie e aneddote (1760) was based on Sarpi's unpublished writings, later destroyed by book burning.

== Correspondence networks and published letters ==
Sarpi was the centre of a vast political and scholarly network of eminent correspondents, from which about 430 of his letters have survived. Early letter collections were: "Lettere Italiane di Fra Sarpi" (Geneva, 1673); "Scelte lettere inedite de P. Sarpi", edited by Aurelio Bianchi-Giovini (Capolago, 1833); "Lettere raccolte di Sarpi", edited by Polidori (Florence, 1863); "Lettere inedite di Sarpi a S. Contarini", edited by Castellani (Venice, 1892).

Some hitherto unpublished letters of Sarpi were edited by Karl Benrath and published, under the title Paolo Sarpi. Neue Briefe, 1608–1610 (at Leipzig in 1909).

A modern edition (1961) Lettere ai Gallicani has been published of his hundreds of letters to French correspondents. These are mainly to jurists: Jacques Auguste de Thou, Jacques Lechassier, Jacques Gillot. Another correspondent was William Cavendish, 2nd Earl of Devonshire; English translations by Thomas Hobbes of 45 letters to the Earl were published (Hobbes acted as the Earl's secretary), and it is now thought that these are jointly from Sarpi (when alive) and his close friend Fulgenzio Micanzio, something concealed at the time as a matter of prudence. Micanzio was also in touch with Dudley Carleton, 1st Viscount Dorchester. Giusto Fontanini's Storia arcana della vita di Pietro Sarpi (1863), a bitter libel, is important for the letters of Sarpi it contains.

== Views ==
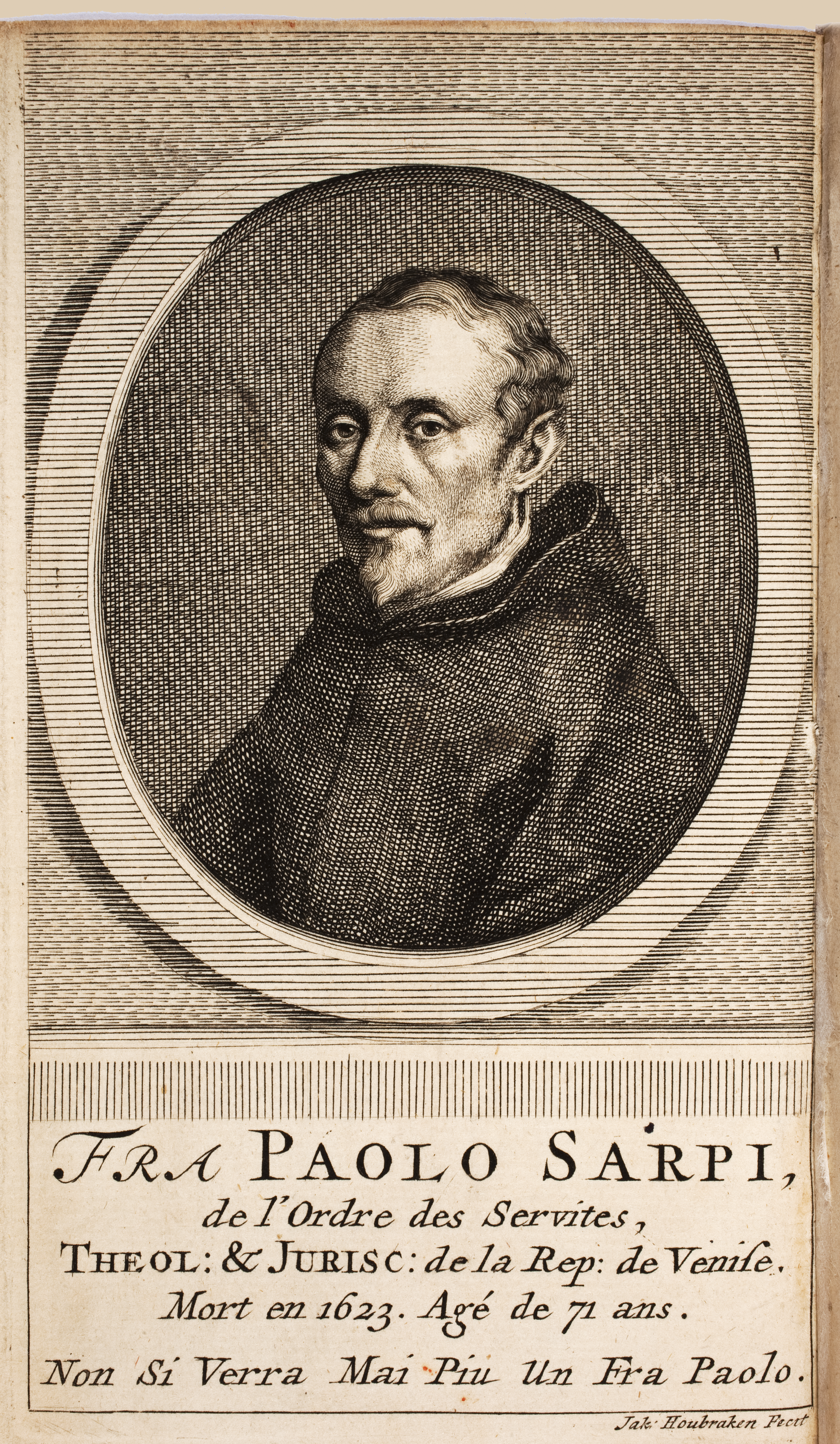
Paolo Sarpi

Sarpi read and was influenced by the skepticism of Michel de Montaigne and his disciple Pierre Charron. As a historian and thinker in the realist tradition of Tacitus, Machiavelli, and Guicciardini, he stressed that patriotism as national pride or honour could play a central role in social control. At various times during his lifetime he was suspected of a lack of orthodoxy in religion: he appeared before the Inquisition around 1575, in 1594, and in 1607.

Sarpi hoped for toleration of Protestant worship in Venice and the establishment of a Venetian free church by which the decrees of the Council of Trent would have been rejected. Sarpi discusses his intimate beliefs and motives in his correspondence with Christoph von Dohna, envoy to Venice for Christian I, Prince of Anhalt-Bernburg. Sarpi told Dohna that he greatly disliked saying Mass and celebrated it as seldom as possible, but that he was compelled to do so, as he would otherwise seem to admit the validity of the papal prohibition. Sarpi's maxim was that "God does not regard externals so long as the mind and heart are right before Him." Another maxim Sarpi formulated to Dohna was Le falsità non dico mai mai, ma la verità non a ognuno ("I never, never tell falsehoods, but the truth I do not tell to everyone.").

Sarpi at the end of his life wrote to Daniel Heinsius that he favoured the side of the Calvinist Contra-Remonstrants at the Synod of Dort. Yet although Sarpi corresponded with James I of England and admired the English Book of Common Prayer, Catholic theologian Le Courayer in the 18th century wrote that Sarpi was no Protestant, terming him "Catholique en gros et quelque fois Protestant en détail" ("Catholic in general and sometimes Protestant in detail"). In the twentieth century, William James Bouwsma found Sarpi to have been a philo-Protestant whose religious ideas were nevertheless "consistent with Catholic orthodoxy," and Eric Cochrane described him as deeply religious in the typical spirit of the Counter-Reformation. Corrado Vivanti saw Sarpi as a religious reformer who aspired toward an ecumenical church, and historian Diarmaid MacCulloch describes Sarpi as having moved away from dogmatic Christianity. On the other hand, in 1983 David Wootton made a case for Sarpi as a scientific materialist and thus as likely a "veiled" atheist who was "hostile to Christianity itself" and whose politics looked forward to a secular society unrealizable in his own time, a thesis that has won some acceptance. Jaska Kainulainen, on the other hand, asserts that the thesis that Sarpi was an atheist contradicts the historical record, observing that neither Sarpi's pronounced skepticism nor his pessimistic view of capabilities are incompatible with religious faith:

Sarpi’s writings do not support the claim that he was an atheist. In fact, from an atheistic point of view, systematic skepticism can be seen as providing support of religious belief, because atheists' position postulates certain knowledge of God's inexistence. ...In his case the fundamental question was not the existence of God, but whether knowledge of God was obtainable by reason or by faith. His response was unequivocal: he was convinced that knowledge of divine matters was attained sola fide and he explicitly claimed that in religious matters one could not make judgments based on reason, but instead, they had to be based on affection or feeling

== Scientific scholar ==
Sarpi wrote notes on François Viète which established his proficiency in mathematics, and a metaphysical treatise now lost, which is said to have anticipated the ideas of John Locke. His anatomical pursuits probably date from an earlier period. They illustrate his versatility and thirst for knowledge, but are otherwise not significant. His claim to have anticipated William Harvey's discovery rests on no better authority than a memorandum, probably copied from Andreas Caesalpinus or Harvey himself, with whom, as well as with Francis Bacon and William Gilbert, Sarpi corresponded. The only physiological discovery which can be safely attributed to him is that of the contractility of the iris.

Sarpi wrote on projectile motion in the period 1578–84, in the tradition of Niccolò Fontana Tartaglia; and then again in reporting on Guidobaldo del Monte's ideas in 1592, possibly by then having met Galileo Galilei. Galileo corresponded with him. Sarpi heard of the telescope in November 1608, perhaps before Galileo. Details then came to Sarpi from Giacomo Badoer in Paris, in a letter describing the configuration of lenses. In 1609, the Venetian Republic had a telescope on approval for military purposes, but Sarpi had them turn it down, anticipating the better model Galileo had made and brought later that year.

== See also ==
- Baldassarre Capra
- Edwin Sandys (American colonist)
- Henry Wotton
- William Bedell

== Select Bibliography ==
- Kainulainen, Jaska (2014). Paolo Sarpi: A Servant of God and State. Brill, 2014.
- Kern, Darcy (2016). "Platonic Words: Paolo Sarpi and Roberto Bellarmino as Translators in the Venetian Interdict Crisis." Philological Quarterly, 95(3-4), 379–395.
- de Vivo, Filippo (2006). "Paolo Sarpi and the Uses of Information in Seventeenth-Century Venice", pp. 35–49. In Raymond, Joad, ed. News Networks in Seventeenth Century Britain and Europe. Routledge.
- Wootton, David (1983). Paolo Sarpi: Between Renaissance and Enlightenment. Cambridge University Press ISBN 0-521-23146-9
- Lievsay, John Leon (1973). Venetian Phoenix: Paolo Sarpi and Some of His English Friends (1606–1700). Wichita: University Press of Kansas.
- Bouwsma, William James (1984, 1968). Venice and the Defense of Republican Liberty: Renaissance Values in the Age of the Counter-Reformation. University of California Press.
- Burke, Peter, editor and translator (1962). The History of Benefices and Selections from the History of the Council of Trent, by Paolo Sarpi. New York: Washington Square Press.
- Frances A. Yates (1944). "Paolo Sarpi's History of the Council of Trent". Journal of the Warburg and Courtauld Institutes 7:123–143.
- Johnson, Samuel (1810). "Father Paul Sarpi," pp. 3–10 in The Works of Samuel Johnson, L.L.D., in Twelve Volumes, Vol. 10. London: Jay Nichols and Son.
