= Jacques Leschassier =

Jacques Leschassier (or Lechassier) (1550 – 1625) was a French jurist and magistrate, known for his erudition and Gallican views.

== Life ==
He was an avocat of the Parlement of Paris, and then procureur-général of the Parlement. He supported the Salic Law and in 1606 argued the case for Gallican ecclesiastical independence.

Leschassier put forward proposals around 1597, intended to help Henry IV of France get better control of royal officeholders, by designating the posts as fiefs.

At the time of the Venetian Interdict, the Venetian diplomat Pietro Priuli recruited Leschassier and Louis Servin to write in Venice's defence. These works argued that the position of the Church of Venice should be equated with that of the Gallican view of the situation of the Church of France. Leschassier then became an intimate correspondent of Paolo Sarpi.
