= Morris Lazerowitz =

American philosopher (1907–1987)

Morris Lazerowitz (October 22, 1907 – February 25, 1987) was a Polish-born American analytic philosopher and author.

== Early life and education ==
Born Morris Laizerowitz in Łódź, Congress Poland, his father, Max and eldest sister emigrated to the United States in 1912 and through their hard work, saved enough money to bring the rest of the family to join them three years later. The family settled in Omaha, Nebraska. Morris studied the violin and becoming proficient enough to be substituting in the Chicago Symphony Orchestra by the age of nineteen. However he was forced by a back injury to give this up.

In 1928, Lazerowitz enrolled at the University of Nebraska and was taught philosophy by O. K. Bouwsma. Lazerowitz completed his degree at the University of Michigan in 1933. A traveling fellowship, 1936–37, enabled him to do postdoctorate work at Cambridge University and at Harvard University. While in Cambridge he was taught by G. E. Moore and Ludwig Wittgenstein.

== Career ==
From 1938 Lazerowitz taught at Smith College, marrying fellow philosopher Alice Ambrose that same year. Except for a year where he was Fulbright professor at Bedford College, London, he went on to teach at Smith for 35 years. After he retired from teaching in 1973, Lazerowitz was named professor emeritus of philosophy at Smith College. He still continued to teach as a visiting professor at Carleton College, Hampshire College and the University of Delaware.

He died in Northampton, Massachusetts.

== Publications ==
=== Books ===
Lazerowitz co-wrote a number of books with Ambrose including a primer on logic which became a widely used textbook in the 1950s and was known as "Ambrose and Lazerowitz". He collaborated with his wife on a number of works: Fundamentals of Symbolic Logic (1948), Logic: The Theory of Formal Inference (1961), Philosophical Theories (1976) and Essays in the Unknown Wittgenstein (1984). His chief contribution to philosophy was his development of the study of metaphilosophy. Morris claims to have created the term ‘metaphilosophy’ around 1940 and used it in print in 1942. He defined 'metaphilosophy' as an investigation of the nature of philosophical theories and their supporting arguments, with the aim of explaining their centuries-long irresolvability. (See Metaphilosophy [1990]: 91 and The Language of Philosophy, chap. 1.) His most important books are The Structure of Metaphysics (1955) and Studies in Metaphilosophy (1964). He also wrote Philosophy and Illusion (1968), The Language of Philosophy: Freud and Wittgenstein (1977), and Cassandra in Philosophy (1983).

=== Papers ===
- Moore and Philosophical Analysis (1958) in Philosophy, Vol. 33, No. 126, pp. 193-220.
- The Hidden Structure of Philosophical Theories (1960) in The Massachusetts Review, Vol. 1, No. 4, pp. 723-747.
- Metaphilosophy (1971) in Crítica: Revista Hispanoamericana de Filosofía, Vol. 5, No. 15, pp. 3-27.
- Free Will (1984, with A. Ambrose) in Crítica: Revista Hispanoamericana de Filosofía, Vol. 16, No. 48 (Dec., 1984), pp. 3-17.
- Wittgenstein: The Nature of Philosophy (1987) in Crítica: Revista Hispanoamericana de Filosofía, Vol. 19, No. 56, pp. 3-17.
