= Giacomo Badoer (French diplomat) =

Giacomo Badoer (c.1575 – c.1620) was a French-born diplomat, of Venetian parentage, and pupil of Galileo Galilei.

== Scientific interests ==
Badoer studied mathematics with Galileo in Padua in 1598/9. He later supported Galileo in 1607, in a priority dispute with Baldassarre Capra over the invention of a military compass.

Badoer was one of the correspondents of Paolo Sarpi in Venice, who towards the end of 1608 was making enquiries about the invention in the Netherlands of the telescope. Badoer wrote back in spring 1609 from Paris to Sarpi with news of the commercial telescopes then being sold; it is said that Galileo heard of the new product via this route, around July 1609. He mentioned Badoer as his source in Sidereus Nuncius.

Badoer remained close to Galileo, according to Élie Diodati, writing around 1620, when Badoer was already dead.

== Religion and diplomacy ==
By upbringing Badoer was a Huguenot; he became a Catholic convert through the Jesuit Pierre Coton, at some point in the period 1599 to 1603, and by this connection became a diplomat in the service of Henry IV of France. One mission was to Cleves in 1609, at the time of the Jülich-Cleves War. Sarpi, who in 1609 wrote to Badoer in confiding terms, broke with him around 1610: he then described Badoer as an atheist, and Francesco Castrino of Sarpi's network wrote obscene poems about him (Badoer was a reputed homosexual).
