= Francis Skinner =

English mathematician and companion of Wittgenstein (1912-1941)

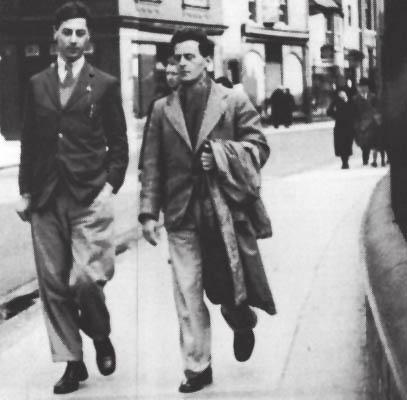
- Francis Skinner (left) and Ludwig Wittgenstein (right) walking with one another in Cambridge
- Born: Sidney George Francis Guy Skinner; 1912; Kensington, London, England
- Died: 11 October 1941 (aged 28–29)
- Education: University of Cambridge (Graduated with a degree in mathematics in 1933)
- Occupations: Gardener; Mechanic

Sidney George Francis Guy Skinner (1912 – 11 October 1941) was a friend, lover and collaborator of the Austrian philosopher Ludwig Wittgenstein.

== Biography ==
Francis Skinner was born in 1912 in Kensington, London, England. Both his father and mother were academically distinguished: his father Sidney Skinner, was a Cambridge chemist and later Director of the South-Western Polytechnic Institute, and his mother, Marion Field Michaelis, a mathematician at Harvard College Observatory.

Skinner was educated at St Paul's School in London. He studied the Mathematics Tripos at Trinity College, Cambridge, following in the footsteps of his older sister Priscilla, herself a talented mathematician and an undergraduate at Newnham College.

In 1930, Skinner, then a student, met Wittgenstein, fell under his influence and "became utterly, uncritically, and almost obsessively devoted" to him. Their relationship was seen by others as being characterized by Skinner's eagerness to please Wittgenstein and conform to his opinions.

Skinner graduated with a first-class degree in mathematics from Cambridge in 1933 and was awarded a postgraduate fellowship. He used this fellowship to work with Wittgenstein on a book on philosophy and mathematics (unpublished, possibly the "Pink Book" archive discovered in 2011). While it has been assumed that Skinner was merely a student taking dictation, the discovery of the original archives indicates that Skinner played a significant role in shaping and editing the work.

With Wittgenstein he took Russian classes from Fania Pascal, wife of Roy Pascal. In 1934, the two made plans to emigrate to the Soviet Union and become manual labourers, but Wittgenstein visited the country briefly and realised the plan was not feasible; the Soviet Union might have allowed Wittgenstein to immigrate as a teacher, but not as a manual labourer.

Around 1933–1934 Wittgenstein dictated to Skinner what has since been given the name the Pink Book. During the academic year 1934–1935, Wittgenstein dictated to Skinner and Alice Ambrose the text of the Brown Book.

Wittgenstein's hostility toward academia resulted in Skinner's withdrawal from university, first to become a gardener, and later a mechanic (much to the dismay of Skinner's family). Meanwhile, his sister Priscilla continued her mathematical career, winning a Fellowship and, during the Second World War, working as a mathematician at the Royal Aircraft Establishment. (Priscilla's daughter is chemist Ruth Lynden-Bell)

He attempted to join the International Brigade during the Spanish Civil War but was rejected on medical grounds. As a teenager he had osteomyelitis which resulted in a limp in one of his legs.

In the late 1930s, Wittgenstein grew increasingly distant from Skinner.

Skinner died from polio, following an air raid in Cambridge in October 1941, having been neglected during the rush to treat victims of the bombing.

Despite the weakening of their relationship, Wittgenstein was apparently traumatised by Skinner's death, resulting in the loss for 7 years of the work they were engaged in together, the 'Pink Book'.

== Pink Book ==
In 2011, an extensive archive came to light, consisting of 170,000 words of handwriting, text and mathematics. This apparently had mostly been dictated by Wittgenstein to Skinner, with annotations by both. The archive includes a long-lost, so-called Pink Book. Wittgenstein had posted them to a friend of Skinner days after his death.

In 2020 Arthur Gibson and Niamh O'Mahony released as editors a book of the manuscripts which are in the hand of Skinner, with later amendments in Wittgenstein's own hand.

== Personal life ==
According to Wittgenstein's diaries, Skinner and Wittgenstein were involved in a sexual relationship. Wittgenstein recorded ambivalent feelings about their encounters, describing the initial feeling as "nothing bad", with feelings of "shame" mentioned afterward.
