= Baldassarre Capra =

Italian scientist

Baldassarre Capra (Milan, 1580 − Milan, 8 May 1626) was an Italian scientist who disputed Galileo Galilei's claim to priority of the discovery of Kepler's Supernova and also claimed to have invented the proportional compass, accusing Galileo of plagiarism.

== Early life ==
The son of count Marco Aurelio Capra and Ippolita Dalla Croce, Baldassarre came from a family of the ancient nobility but with reduced circumstances. His father was an amateur doctor, and in 1594 he moved to Padua with his son so that he could study medicine, astronomy and mathematics. To support them, Marco Aurelio gave fencing lessons. One of his students was Galileo himself, introduced by their mutual acquaintance Giacomo Alvise Cornaro.

== Kepler's Supernova ==
In Padua, Capra met Simon Mayr, an astronomer who was a pupil of Tycho Brahe, with whom he studied mathematics. On 10 October 1604, together with Mayr, Capra observed a new star (now known as Kepler's supernova) which had been first seen by the friar Ilario Altobelli, who had written to Galileo about his important discovery.

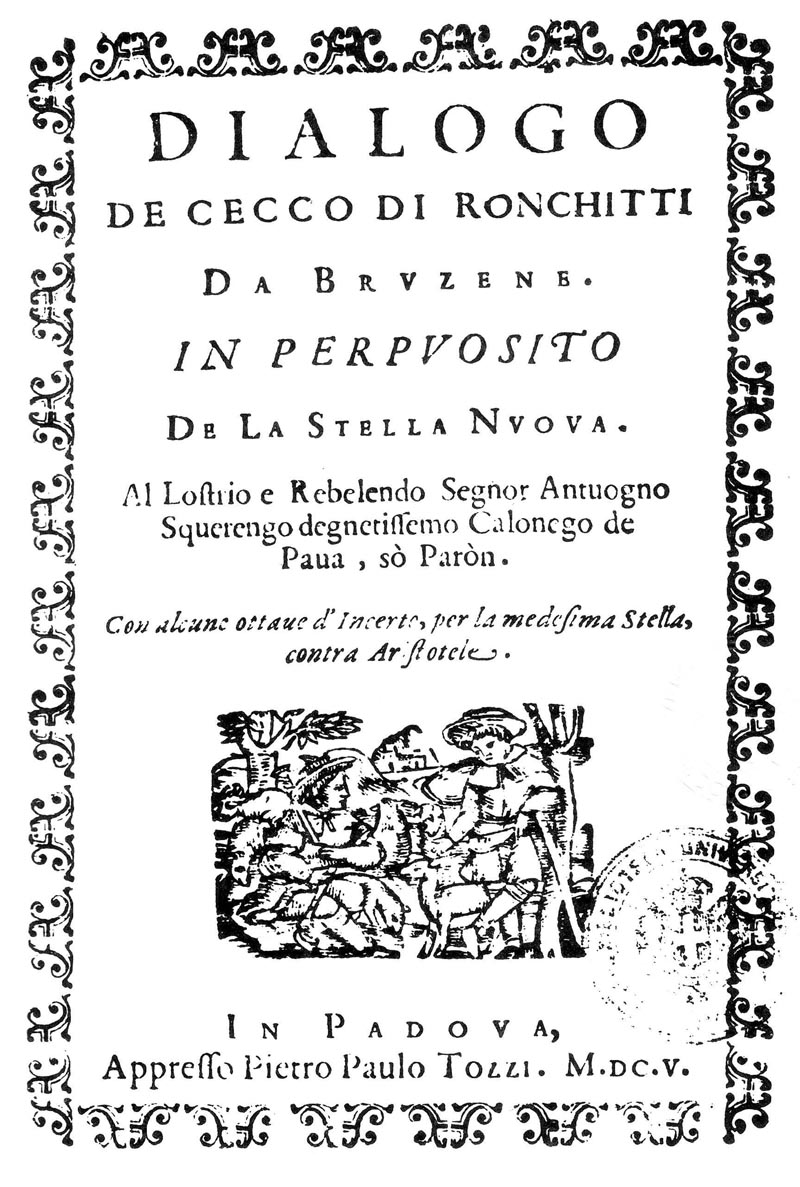
Title page of Galileo's Dialogo in perpuosito de la stella Nuova (1605)

In three public lectures, Galileo used the discovery of the new star to challenge the ideas of the Peripatetic philosophers of Padua, who held the Aristotelian view that the sphere of the stars was unchangeable. Capra was offended by Galileo's failure to acknowledge him as the person who had discovered the star, and, encouraged by Mayr, in 1605 he published a pamphlet attacking Galileo's position, entitled Consideratione astronomica circa la nova et portentosa Stella che nell'anno 1604 a dì 10 ottobre apparse. Among his conclusions, Capra noted that in 1572 a similar new star (Tycho's supernova) had appeared in the constellation Cassiopeia. He argued that the interval between the two stars' appearance was the same as the number of years in the life of Jesus Christ. As both were situated among the fixed stars, their appearance must denote something of great significance.

Galileo did not respond to this provocation, but he scribbled marginal notes in his copy with terms such as "bue" ("ox") and "coglione" ("balls"), deriding him for his ignorance of both Italian and Latin. Then, concealing his identity behind the pseudonym 'Cecco di Ronchitti', he responded to Antonio Lorenzini and his pamphlet Discorso intorno alla Nuova Stella (Padua, 1605) in a caustic pamphlet entitled Dialogo de Cecco di Ronchitti da Bruzene in perpuosito de la stella Nuova, written in the ancient dialect of Padua (called "dialetto pavano").

== Plagiarism accusation against Galileo ==
Capra's second confrontation with Galileo was sufficiently serious for Galileo to decide he needed to confront it openly. In 1602, Capra and his father had asked Galileo to let them observe how his proportional compass worked – although Galileo had not invented the instrument, he had made it much easier to use and had devised new applications for it. In 1605, the Capras had borrowed a Galilean compass from their friend Giacomo Alvise Cornaro and spent time at the workshop of Marc'Antonio Mazzoleni, the craftsman who made Galileo's instruments, learning how the compass was made.

In 1607, Baldassarre Capra published the tract Usus et fabrica circini cuiusdam proportionis, per quem omnia fere tum Euclidis, tum mathematicorum omnium problemata facile negotio resolvitur, which was more or less a translation into Latin of Galileo's 1606 work Le operazioni del compasso geometrico et militare. Capra dedicated the work to Cornaro and used it to claim that he had invented the proportional compass himself. Galileo, who had successfully defended himself against a previous charge of plagiarism in 1602, could not afford to take Capra's claims lightly. He therefore asked for the matter to be adjudicated by the university rectors.

== The hearing ==
During the hearing, Galileo demonstrated not only that he had not copied Capra's work, but that Capra had copied his work, and where Capra had introduced original material, he had introduced errors. The testimony of Galileo's friend Paolo Sarpi was crucial to the hearing, and he declared that Galileo had given him a compass as early as 1597.

Capra stated that he was willing to apologize for his unfounded allegation of plagiarism by publishing a book acknowledging the offence caused to Galileo. Galileo refused, wanting to give the widest possible publicity to Capra's eventual condemnation. The hearing continued, and Capra's position was further weakened when he refused to demonstrate to the tribunal how the compass was used. The rectors found him guilty and ordered that all copies of his book were to be destroyed, though some had already been sent outside the Republic of Venice. Galileo published their verdict in his favour, as well as a tract entitled Difesa contro alle calunnie et imposture di Baldessar Capra (Venice, 1607), which showed how Capra's accusations were false.

Galileo apparently believed that Simon Mayr had instigated Capra's false claim, and in his great work The Assayer he accused Mayr of having translated his instructions on the compass into Latin and then having them printed using Capra's name. After the hearing, Capra left Padua and returned to Milan where he continued to teach the use of the compass. His disgrace was apparently not forgotten, as in 1620 he was refused admission into the city's College of Medicine due to the efforts of Ludovico Settala, who energetically opposed him because of his behavior toward Galileo.

== Bibliography ==
- Tabarroni, Giorgio (1971). "Capra, Baldassar or Baldksar". Dictionary of Scientific Biography. Vol. III. New York: Charles Scribner's Sons. pp. 59–61.
- Giorgio Abetti, Amici e nemici di Galileo, Milano, Bompiani, 1945
- Giuliano Gliozzi, "Capra, Baldassarre", Dizionario Biografico degli Italiani, vol. 19, Roma, Istituto dell'Enciclopedia italiana, 1976
