= Alice Ambrose =

American philosopher, logician, and author (1906–2001)

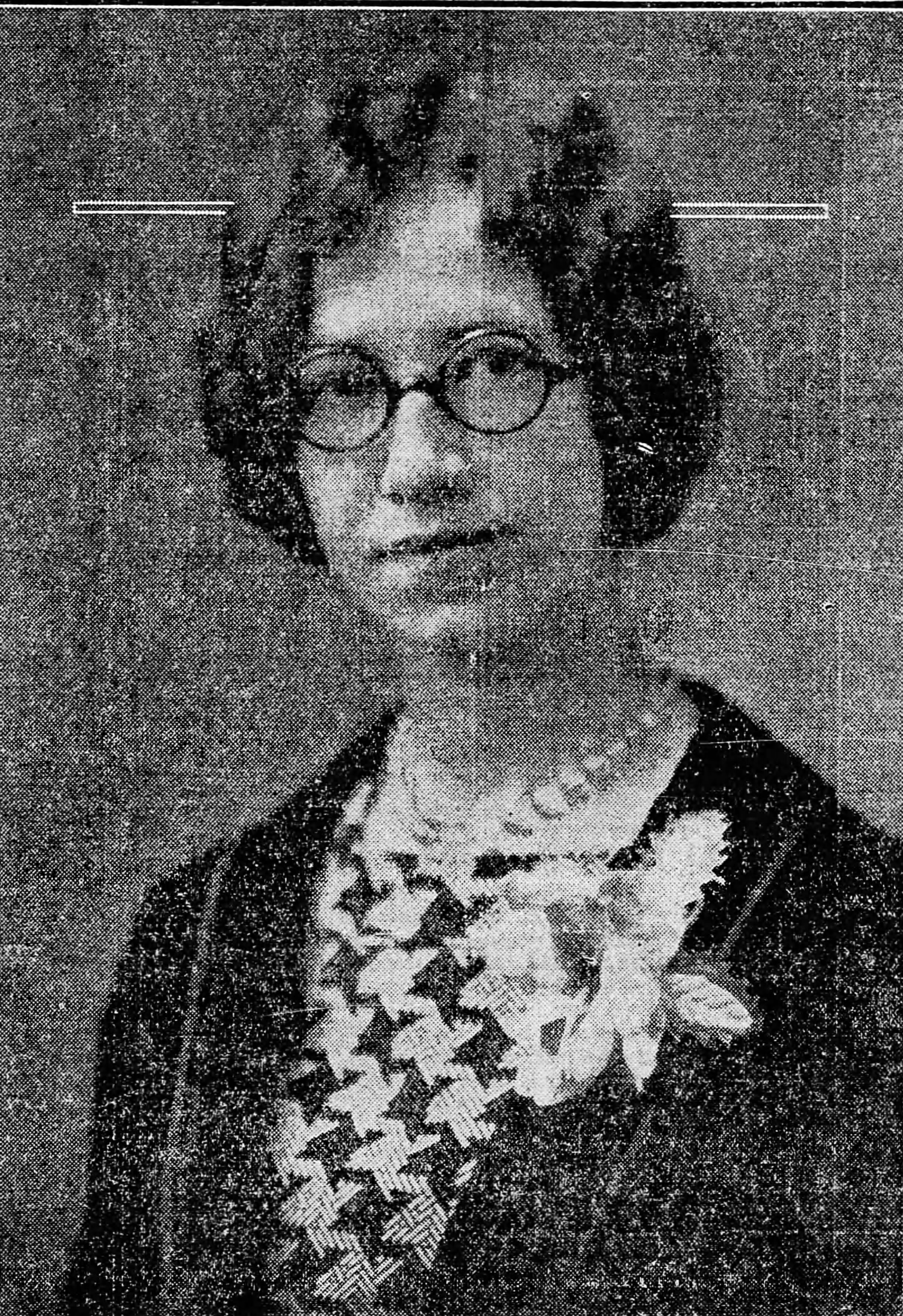
- Alice Ambrose in 1928
- Born: Alice Loman Ambrose; November 25, 1906; Lexington, Illinois, U.S.
- Died: January 25, 2001 (aged 94); Northampton, Massachusetts, U.S.
- Occupations: Philosopher, logician, author
- Spouse: Morris Lazerowitz

Academic background
- Education: Millikin University; University of Wisconsin–Madison; Newnham College, Cambridge
- Doctoral advisor: Evander Bradley McGilvary; G. E. Moore
- Other advisor: Ludwig Wittgenstein

Academic work
- Discipline: Philosophy
- Institutions: University of Michigan; Smith College

Alice Ambrose Lazerowitz (November 25, 1906 – January 25, 2001) was an American philosopher, logician, and author.

== Early life and education ==
Alice Loman Ambrose was born in Lexington, Illinois and orphaned when she was 13 years old. She studied at Millikin University (1924–28), graduating with a B.A. in mathematics and minor in French. She obtained her MA in 1929 and PhD in philosophy in 1932 from the University of Wisconsin–Madison. In 1932–1935, she studied at Cambridge University (Newnham College) with G. E. Moore and Ludwig Wittgenstein, from where she earned a second PhD in 1938.

== Wittgenstein ==
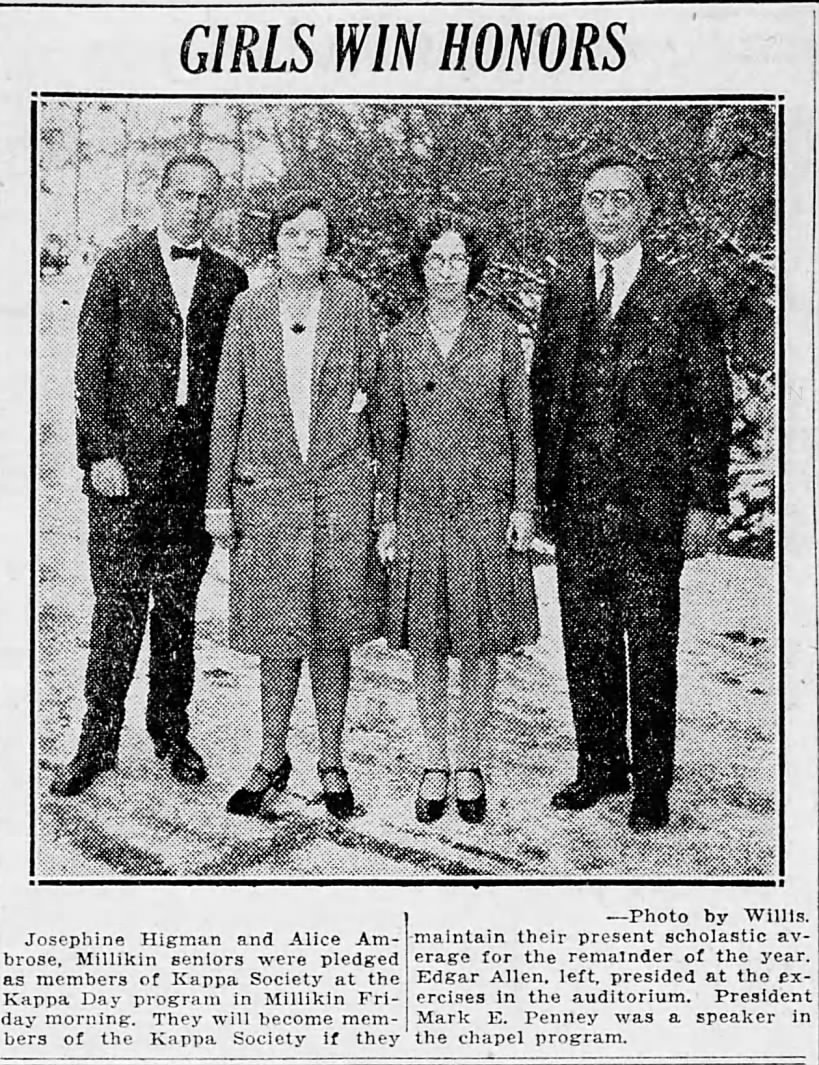
Alice Ambrose in 1927

Having become a close disciple of Wittgenstein, Ambrose later related her association with him in "Ludwig Wittgenstein: A Portrait" first published in Ludwig Wittgenstein: Philosophy and Language (1972), a volume co-edited with her husband Morris Lazerowitz. Along with fellow student Margaret MacDonald she secretly (since he did not allow this) made notes during Wittgenstein's lectures, which were later published. She was one of a select group of students to whom Wittgenstein dictated the so-called Blue and Brown Books, which outline the transition in Wittgenstein's thought between his two major works, Tractatus Logico-Philosophicus and Philosophical Investigations. There is also the so-called Yellow Book which consists of notes taken by Ambrose and Margaret Masterman during the intervals between the dictation of the Blue Book.

Wittgenstein terminated their association abruptly in 1935, when Ambrose decided, with encouragement from G. E. Moore, to publish an article entitled "Finitism in Mathematics" in the philosophical journal Mind which was intended to give an account of Wittgenstein's position on the subject.

== Career ==
Ambrose began her career at the University of Michigan, when she returned to the United States in 1935. She then took a position in Smith College in 1937, where she remained for the rest of her career. She was awarded the Austin and Sophia Smith chair in Philosophy in 1964 and became professor emeritus in 1972. Between 1953 and 1968, she was editor of the Journal of Symbolic Logic. She worked chiefly in logic and mathematical philosophy, writing a primer on the subject with her husband which became a widely used textbook and was known as "Ambrose and Lazerowitz". She collaborated with her husband on a number of works: Fundamentals of Symbolic Logic (1948), Logic: The Theory of Formal Inference (1961), Philosophical Theories (1976) and Essays in the Unknown Wittgenstein (1984). Even after her retirement she continued to teach and guest lecture at Smith, Hampshire College, the University of Delaware, and other universities around the country until her death.

Ambrose died at the age of 94, on January 25, 2001, in Northampton, Massachusetts.

Her personal papers are held at Smith College Archives.

== Publications ==
=== Books ===
- Ambrose, A. & M. Lazerowitz (1948). Fundamentals of Symbolic Logic. Rinehart.
- Ambrose, A. (1966). Essays in Analysis. Allen & Unwin.
- Ambrose, A. & M. Lazerowitz, ed. (1948). Logic: The Theory of Formal Inference. Rinehart.
- Ambrose, Alice (1966). Essays in Analysis (1 ed.). London: Routledge. doi:10.4324/9781032641768. ISBN 978-1-032-64176-8.
- Ambrose, A. & M. Lazerowitz, ed. (1970). G.E. Moore : essays in retrospect. Allen & Unwin.
- Ambrose, A. & M. Lazerowitz, ed. (1972). Ludwig Wittgenstein: Philosophy and Language. Allen & Unwin. ISBN 0041000293.
- Ambrose, A. & M. Lazerowitz (1976). Philosophical Theories. Mouton de Gruyter. ISBN 9027975019.
- Ambrose, A. & M. Lazerowitz, ed. (1984). Essays in the unknown Wittgenstein. Prometheus Books.
- Ambrose, A. & M. Lazerowitz (1985). Necessity and language. Croom Helm. ISBN 0709941013.

=== Essays ===
- (1931) "A Critical Discussion of Mind and the World-Order", The Journal of Philosophy, Vol. 28, No. 14 (Jul. 2, 1931), pp. 365–381.
- (1933) "A Controversy in the Logic of Mathematics", The Philosophical Review, Vol. 42, No. 6 (Nov., 1933), pp. 594–611.
- (1935) "Finitism in Mathematics (I)". Mind. 44 (174). [Oxford University Press, Mind Association]: 186–203. 1935. ISSN 0026-4423. JSTOR 2249861.
- (1935) "Finitism in Mathematics (II.)". Mind. 44 (175). [Oxford University Press, Mind Association]: 317–340. 1935. ISSN 0026-4423. JSTOR 2250159.
- (1937) "Finitism and "The Limits of Empiricism"". Mind. 46 (183). [Oxford University Press, Mind Association]: 379–385. 1937. ISSN 0026-4423. JSTOR 2250224.
- (1942) "Moore's "Proof of an External World"", in Paul Schilpp (ed.) The Philosophy of G.E. Moore, Volume 2.
- (1944) "Self-Contradictory Suppositions". Mind. 53 (209). [Oxford University Press, Mind Association]: 48–59. 1944. ISSN 0026-4423. JSTOR 2250508.
- (1946) "The Problem of Justifying Inductive Inference", The Journal of Philosophy, Vol. 44, No. 10 (May 8, 1947), pp. 253-272.
- (1950) "The Problem of Linguistic Inadequacy", in: Black, Max (ed) Philosophical Analysis, pp.14–35
- (1952) "Linguistic Approaches to Philosophical Problems". The Journal of Philosophy. 49 (9). Journal of Philosophy, Inc.: 289–301 1952. doi:10.2307/2021362. ISSN 0022-362X. JSTOR 2021362.
- (1955) "Wittgenstein on Some Questions in Foundations of Mathematics", The Journal of Philosophy, Vol. 52, No. 8 (Apr. 14, 1955), pp. 197–214. Reprinted in: J. V. Canfield (Ed.), The Philosophy of Wittgenstein: Volume 11, Philosophy of Mathematics (1986).
- (1959) "Proof and the Theorem Proved". Mind. 68 (272). [Oxford University Press, Mind Association]: 435–445. 1959. ISSN 0026-4423. Reprinted in: J. V. Canfield (Ed.), The Philosophy of Wittgenstein: Volume 11, Philosophy of Mathematics (1986)
- (1960) "Three Aspects of Moore's Philosophy". The Journal of Philosophy. 57 (26). Journal of Philosophy, Inc.: 816–824 1960. doi:10.2307/2023619. ISSN 0022-362X. JSTOR 2023619.
- (1963) "Austin's 'Philosophical Papers'", Philosophy, Vol. 38, No. 145 (Jul., 1963), pp. 201–216.
- (1966) “Wittgenstein on Universals” in W. E. Kennick and M. Lazerowitz (eds.) Metaphysics: Readings and Reappraisals, ch. 7.
- (1967) "On Criteria of Literal Significance", Crítica: Revista Hispanoamericana de Filosofía, Vol. 1, No. 1 (Jan., 1967), pp. 49–76.
- (1968) "The Revolution in Philosophy: From the Structure of the World to the Structure of Language", The Massachusetts Review, vol. 9, no. 3, pp. 551–64
- (1970) "Philosophy, language and illusion" in Hanly, Charles; Lazerowitz, M (ed.) Psychoanalysis and Philosophy pp. 14–34
- (1972) “Ludwig Wittgenstein: A Portrait”. In Ludwig Wittgenstein: Philosophy and Language, edited by A. Ambrose and M. Lazerowitz, pp. 13–25.
- (1976) "Commanding a Clear View of Philosophy". Proceedings and Addresses of the American Philosophical Association. 49: 5–21. doi:10.2307/3129988. ISSN 0065-972X.
- (1977) "The Yellow Book Notes in Relation to "The Blue Book"", Crítica: Revista Hispanoamericana de Filosofía, Vol. 9, No. 26 (Aug. 1977), pp. 3–23. JSTOR 40104058
- (1982) "Wittgenstein on Mathematical Proof", Mind, Vol. 91, No. 362 (Apr., 1982), pp. 264–272.
- (1984) "Free Will" (with M. Lazerowitz), Crítica: Revista Hispanoamericana de Filosofía, Vol. 16, No. 48 (Dec., 1984), pp. 3–17.
- (1989) "Moore and Wittgenstein as Teachers", Teaching Philosophy 12(2): 107–113. doi:10.5840/teachphil198912246.

== See also ==
- American philosophy
- List of American philosophers
