= William J. Bouwsma =

American scholar and historian

William James Bouwsma
- Born: November 22, 1923; Ann Arbor, Michigan
- Died: March 2, 2004 (aged 80); Berkeley, California
- Occupation: Professor
- Known for: Sather Professor of History Emeritus

William James Bouwsma (November 22, 1923 – March 2, 2004) was an American scholar and historian of the European Renaissance. He was Sather Professor of History Emeritus at the University of California, Berkeley and president of the American Historical Association (AHA) in 1978.

== Early life and education ==
Born in Ann Arbor, Michigan of Dutch descent, he was raised in Lincoln, Nebraska. He received his B.A. from Harvard College in 1943. Upon graduation from Harvard, he joined the United States Army Air Forces where he spent three years as a classification specialist stationed in Denver, Colorado and became a buck sergeant. Following service in Army Air Forces, he returned to Harvard, receiving his Ph.D. in 1950.

His father was the philosopher O.K. Bouwsma.

== Academic career ==
Bouwsma taught at the University of Illinois Urbana-Champaign until 1957 when he accepted a position in the History Department at U.C. Berkeley. After teaching for two years at Harvard (1969–1971), he returned to U.C. Berkeley as Chairman of the History Department, serving in this capacity from 1966 to 1967, and from 1981 to 1983. He was chancellor for academic affairs from 1967 to 1969. He was an elected member of both the American Academy of Arts and Sciences and the American Philosophical Society.

In 1992, he received the inaugural Nancy Lyman Roelker Mentorship Award from the American Historical Association.

== Works ==
- "The Politics of Commynes", The Journal of Modern History Volume 23, Number 4, December 1951 doi:10.1086/237449
- Concordia Mundi: the career and thought of Guillaume Postel; 1510-1581 Harvard historical monographs 33 (1957).
- Venice and the Defense of Republican Liberty: Renaissance Values in the Age of the Counter Reformation (University of California Press, 1968); LCCN 68-14642
  - Bouwsma, William J. (15 November 2023). 2023 Kindle edition of 1st edition. Univ of California Press. ISBN 978-0520368927.
- John Calvin: A Sixteenth Century Portrait (Oxford University Press, 1988) LCCN 87-12338
  - Bouwsma, William J. (March 17, 1989). 1989 pbk edition. Oxford University Press. ISBN 0-19-505951-4.
- A Usable Past: Essays in European Cultural History (University of California Press, 1990); LCCN 89-29621 ISBN 0520069900
- "Eclipse of the Renaissance", The American Historical Review Volume 103, Number 1, February 1998 doi:10.1086/ahr/103.1.115
- The Waning of the Renaissance, 1550–1640 (Yale University Press, 2000); LCCN 00-49538 ISBN 0300085370
  - Bouwsma, William James (January 2002). 2002 pbk edition. Yale University Press. ISBN 0-300-09717-4.
