= Blue and Brown Books =

Book by Ludwig Wittgenstein

The Blue and Brown Books
- Author: Ludwig Wittgenstein
- Language: English
- Subjects: Philosophy of Language; Linguistic Philosophy; Logic
- Publisher: Basil Blackwell
- Publication date: 1958 (unofficially available from 1935)
- Publication place: England
- Media type: Book
- Pages: 185
- OCLC: 660088937

The Blue and Brown Books are two sets of notes taken during lectures conducted by Ludwig Wittgenstein from 1933 to 1935. They were mimeographed as two separate books, and a few copies were circulated in a restricted circle during Wittgenstein's lifetime. The lecture notes from 1933–1934 were bound in blue cloth, and the notes dictated in 1934–1935 were bound in brown. Rush Rhees published these together for the first time in 1958 as Preliminary Studies for the "Philosophical Investigations".

Inchoate versions of many of the ideas that would later be more fully explored in the Philosophical Investigations are found there, so these offer textual evidence for the genesis of what became known as Wittgenstein's later philosophy.

== The Blue Book ==
Wittgenstein began dictating The Blue Book in the Michaelmas term of 1933-4. It contains certain themes unaddressed in Wittgenstein's later works, including deliberations on thinking as operating with signs. An early conception of what would later become known as language-games is present in the text, which represents the first period of Wittgenstein's thought after 1932, a method of linguistic analysis which would later become ordinary language philosophy. It has been described as the "most readily intelligible introduction to [Wittgenstein's] later philosophy".

While Wittgenstein in The Blue Book is not dogmatic nor systematic, he does provide arguments that point toward a more self-critical view of language. For example, he does not think that "understanding" and "explaining" are necessarily related. He suggests that when humans are learning a language-game they are actually being trained to understand it. He writes:

If we are taught the meaning of the word 'yellow' by being given some sort of ostensive definition [in this case, ostensive means something like "denoting a way of defining by direct demonstration, e.g., by pointing"] (a rule of the usage of the word) this teaching can be looked at in two different ways: (a) The teaching is a drill. This drill causes us to associate a yellow image, yellow things, with the word 'yellow.' Thus when I gave the order 'Choose a yellow ball from this bag' the word 'yellow' might have brought up a yellow image, or a feeling of recognition when the person's eye fell on the yellow ball. The drill of teaching could in this case be said to have built up a psychical mechanism. This, however, would only be a hypothesis or else a metaphor. We could compare teaching with installing an electric connection between a switch and a bulb. The parallel to the connection going wrong or breaking down would then be what we call forgetting the explanation, or the meaning, of the word...[I]t is the hypothesis that the process of teaching should be needed in order to bring about these effects. It is conceivable, in this sense, that all the processes of understanding, obeying, etc., should have happened without the person ever having been taught the language; (b) The teaching may have supplied us with a rule which is itself involved in the processes of understanding, obeying, etc.: 'involved,' however, meaning that the expression of this rule forms part of these processes...

As the citation suggests, Wittgenstein views understanding a language-game as being mostly concerned with training (which he calls "drill[ing]" in the above citation). Having said that, Wittgenstein is not one to believe that even understanding a language-game can be reduced to one process; like the plethora of language-games available to human beings, there are also plethora of "understandings." For example, the "understanding" of a language may come about by the "drilling" of the association between the word "yellow" and a yellow-patch; or it may involve learning rules, like rules used in the game of chess. Moreover, Wittgenstein doesn't think that humans use language mechanically, as if following a calculus. He writes in The Blue Book, "[I]n general we don't use language according to strict rules—it hasn't been taught us by means of strict rules, either."

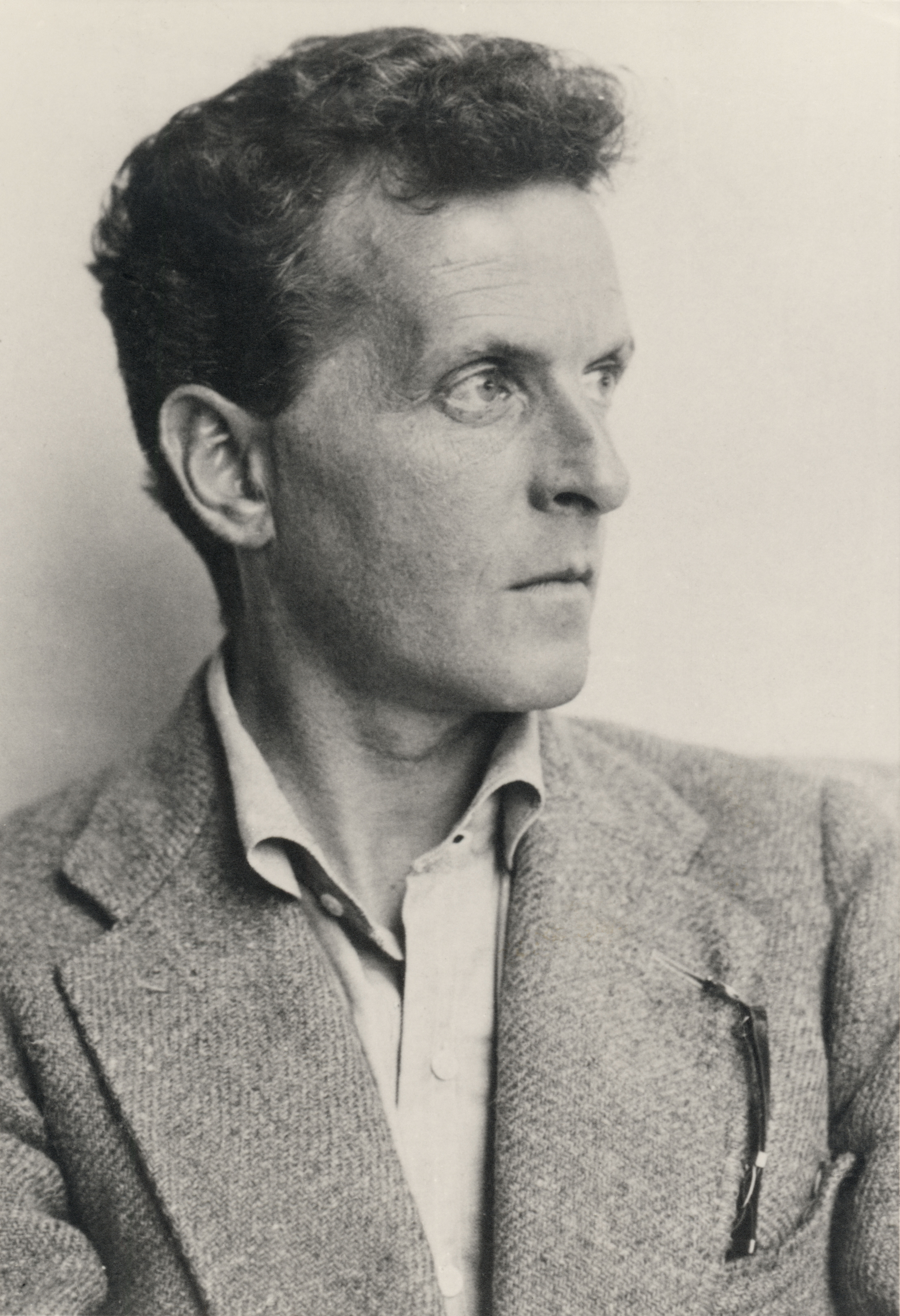
Ludwig Wittgenstein, 1930

Wittgenstein clarifies the problem of communicating using a human language when he discusses learning a language by "ostensive defining." For example, if one wanted to teach someone that a pencil was called a "pencil" and pointed to a pencil and said, "pencil," how does the listener know that what one is trying to convey is that the thing in front of me (e.g., the entire pencil) is called a "pencil"? Isn't it possible that the listener would associate "pencil" with "wood"? Maybe the listener would associate the word "pencil" with "round" instead (as pencils are, usually, in fact, round!). Wittgenstein writes regarding several possible "interpretations" which may arise after such a lesson. The student may interpret your pointing at a pencil and saying "pencil" to mean the following: (1) This is a pencil; (2) This is round; (3) This is wood; (4) This is one; (5) This is hard, etc., etc.

== The Brown Book ==
During the academic year 1934–1935, Wittgenstein dictated to Francis Skinner and Alice Ambrose a text of which three copies were typed and bound. Later it became known as The Brown Book. Wittgenstein contemplated publishing and attempted a German revision, but ultimately abandoned the project as worthless.

== Yellow Book and Pink Book ==
Further texts were composed during this period. The first is the so-called Yellow Book which consists of notes taken by Alice Ambrose and Margaret Masterman during the intervals between the dictation of the Blue Book. It is therefore related to the problems Wittgenstein took up in the Blue Book. The second is the Pink Book which consists of dictations to Francis Skinner.

== Impact ==
=== Influence ===
Although both books were only officially published posthumously, they nevertheless privately circulated in Oxford and Cambridge in the 1930s. Wittgenstein did not publish any book in the interval between the publication of the Tractatus Logico-Philosophicus in 1922 and posthumous publication of the Philosophical Investigations in 1953. As a result, from the 1930s until 1953, it was only through the private circulation of the Blue and Brown Books, and through his pupils and those who knew him, that his influence spread in Britain.

These two books were instrumental in the development of what would be called "ordinary-language philosophy". Many of the philosophers in this movement were directly influenced by the books. P.F. Strawson, for instance, cites them as an influence, and says that they were "at once breathtakingly impressive and profoundly enigmatic".

=== In popular culture ===
In the film Ex Machina (2014), the name of the company designing the artificial intelligence is named 'Blue Book' after Wittgenstein's set of notes, and it is loosely modeled on Google.

In the novel A Philosophical Investigation by Phillip Kerr, a dialogue between a killer identified as neuro-anatomically different and an intuitive female detective occurs. The neuro-anatomical abnormality is supposed to indicate a propensity for murder and individuals are identified and prospectively managed. They are assigned code names in an allegedly anonymised database. The murderer assigned the code name Wittgenstein is tipped into murder by his "diagnosis" hacks into the database and proceeds to murder other abnormal individuals, code named after other philosophers, to prevent them from murdering others. Eventually he is identified but attempts suicide prior to his anticipated trial and punishment by induction of permanent vegetative coma which has replaced the death penalty. Published in the 1990s, the novel is a dystopian scientific futuristic fantasy informed throughout by Wittgenstein's philosophical stances.
