= Simon Marius =

German astronomer (1573–1625)

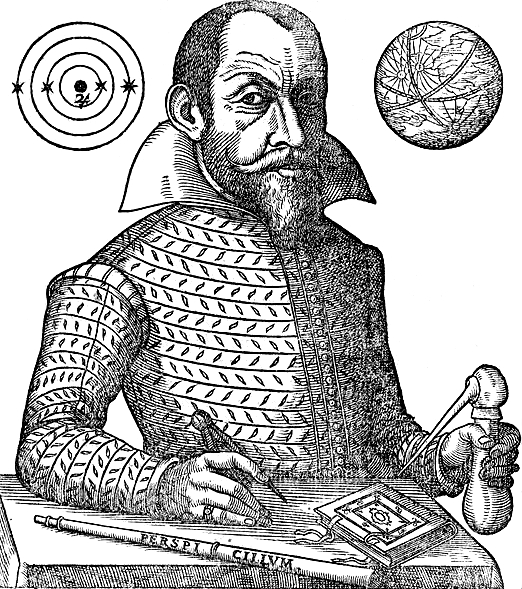
- Engraving of Marius in his book Mundus Iovialis (World of Jupiter), 1614
- Born: Simon Mayr; 10 January 1573; Gunzenhausen, Principality of Ansbach
- Died: 5 January 1625 (aged 51); Ansbach, Principality of Ansbach
- Known for: Naming the four largest moons of Jupiter and studying Andromeda Galaxy
- Scientific career
- Fields: Astronomy

Simon Marius (Latinized form of Simon Mayr; 10 January 1573 – 5 January 1625) was a German astronomer. He was born in Gunzenhausen, near Nuremberg, but spent most of his life in the city of Ansbach. He is best known for being among the first observers of the four largest moons of Jupiter, and his publication of his discovery led to charges of plagiarism.

== Early life ==
Marius was the son of Reichart Mayr, a mayor of Gunzenhausen. On the recommendation of George Frederick, Margrave of Brandenburg-Ansbach, he was admitted to the Margrave's Academy in Heilsbronn in 1586, where he studied until 1601. During this time, he published observations about a comet as well as astronomical tables, which gave him a reputation as a good astronomer and mathematician, and the Margrave appointed him as his official mathematician. Marius wanted to attend the University of Königsberg, but was unable to get a scholarship. However, the Margrave wrote a letter of recommendation on 22 May 1601, so that Marius could study in Prague under Tycho Brahe, which he did for several months, although he may actually have worked directly with David Fabricius instead of Brahe himself.

By September 1601, Marius had already left Prague and he arrived in Padua in December 1601 to study medicine at the University of Padua. During this time, he tutored other students in astronomy, including one Baldassarre Capra, with whom he wrote a book on a new star (actually Kepler's Supernova) which they had observed in 1604. Capra had a dispute with Galileo Galilei (both of them learned fencing from Capra's father) on the invention of the proportional compass and Marius took his student's side in the argument. Marius left the school in July 1605, returning to Ansbach to become the mathematician and physician to the new Margraves, Christian and Joachim Ernst.

In 1606, Marius married Felicitas Lauer (born 1590), the daughter of his publisher, in Ansbach, and in 1609 he published the first German translations of Euclid's Elements. That year, he also built his own telescope and made observations of the Galilean moons, around the same time that Galileo did himself; the priority of discovery became a major dispute between the two.

== Dispute with Galileo ==
Capra published another book in 1607 that he had plagiarised from Galileo. Marius was implicated in the act due to his prior association with Capra, even though this was after Marius had left Padua. Galileo certainly was under that impression, as he referred to his "old adversary" (without explicitly naming Marius) as a "poisonous reptile", and an "enemy of all mankind".

In 1614, Marius published his work Mundus Iovialis (English: World of Jupiter) describing the planet Jupiter and its moons (he previously had published the discovery in 1611 in a local almanac). Here he claimed to have discovered the planet's four major moons about a month before Galileo, who was incensed. In The Assayer in 1623, he accused Marius of plagiarism.

Because of Galileo's stature in the scientific community, for nearly 300 years, Marius's reputation was tainted by Galileo's accusations. However, a scientific committee in the Netherlands in 1903 examined the evidence extensively and ruled in favor of Marius's independent discoveries, with results published by Johannes Bosscha in 1907. Marius had discovered the moons independently but had not noted it until 29 December 1609. Marius used the Julian calendar, and that date is equivalent to 8 January 1610, in the Gregorian one used by Galileo, one day after Galileo's letter in which he first described the moons.

Regardless of priority, the mythological names by which these satellites are known today (Io, Europa, Ganymede and Callisto) are those given them by Marius:

Io, Europa, Ganimedes puer, atque Calisto
lascivo nimium perplacuere Iovi.

Translation:

Io, Europa, the boy Ganymede, and Callisto
greatly pleased lustful Jupiter.

== Discoveries ==
Simon Marius also observed the Andromeda "nebula", which had also been known to Persian Muslim astronomers of the Middle Ages.

Discussion of Marius's work is scarce, but what exists tends to note his skill as an observer, including:

- That in 1612 he measured the diameter of the Andromeda nebula and discerned it as having a dull, pale light which increased in brightness toward its center, like "a candle shining through horn".
- That he detected spurious disks of stars created by his telescope.
- That, from his observations of the Galilean moons he derived better periods of revolution and other orbital elements for them than did Galileo.
- That he observed the location of Tycho Brahe's supernova of 1572 and found a star there which he estimated to be "somewhat dimmer than Jupiter's third moon".

Marius drew conclusions about the structure of the universe from his observations of the Jovian moons and the stellar disks. The stellar disks he observed were spurious (likely the Airy disk caused by diffraction, as stars are too distant for their physical disks to be detected telescopically), but Marius interpreted them to be physical disks, like the planetary disks visible through a telescope. He concluded that since he could see stellar disks, the stars could not be as distant as was required in the Copernican world system, and he said that the appearance of the stars as seen through a telescope actually argued against Copernicus. These findings are contrasting to those of Galileo, who utilized similar telescopic data alternatively to support the Copernican world system. This adherence by Galileo to the Copernican heliocentric theory arises due to its apparent mathematical grandeur and his prior commitment to the theory. Marius, however, showed no evident commitment to any theory but rather hypothesized based on telescopic observation. He also concluded from his observations of the Galilean moons that they must orbit Jupiter while Jupiter orbits the Sun. Therefore, Marius concluded that the geocentric Tychonic system, in which the planets circle the Sun while the Sun circles the Earth, must be the correct world system, or model of the universe.

== Work ==
- Mundus Iovialis anno MDCIX Detectus Ope Perspicilli Belgici (Die Welt des Jupiter, 1609 mit dem flämischen Teleskop entdeckt; Lateinisches Faksimile und deutsche Übersetzung; Hrsg. und bearb. von Joachim Schlör. Naturwiss. begleitet und mit einem Nachw. vers. von Alois Wilder), 1614
- Zinner, E., "Zur Ehrenrettung des Simon Marius", in: Vierteljahresschrift der Astronomischen Gesellschaft, 77. Jahrgang, 1. Heft, Leipzig 1942
- Bosscha, J., "Simon Marius. Réhabilitation d´un astronome calomnié", in: Archives Nederlandaises des Sciences Exactes et Naturelles, Ser. II, T. XII, pp. 258–307, 490–528, La Haye, 1907
