= Wels–Passau railway =

Railway line in Austria and Germany

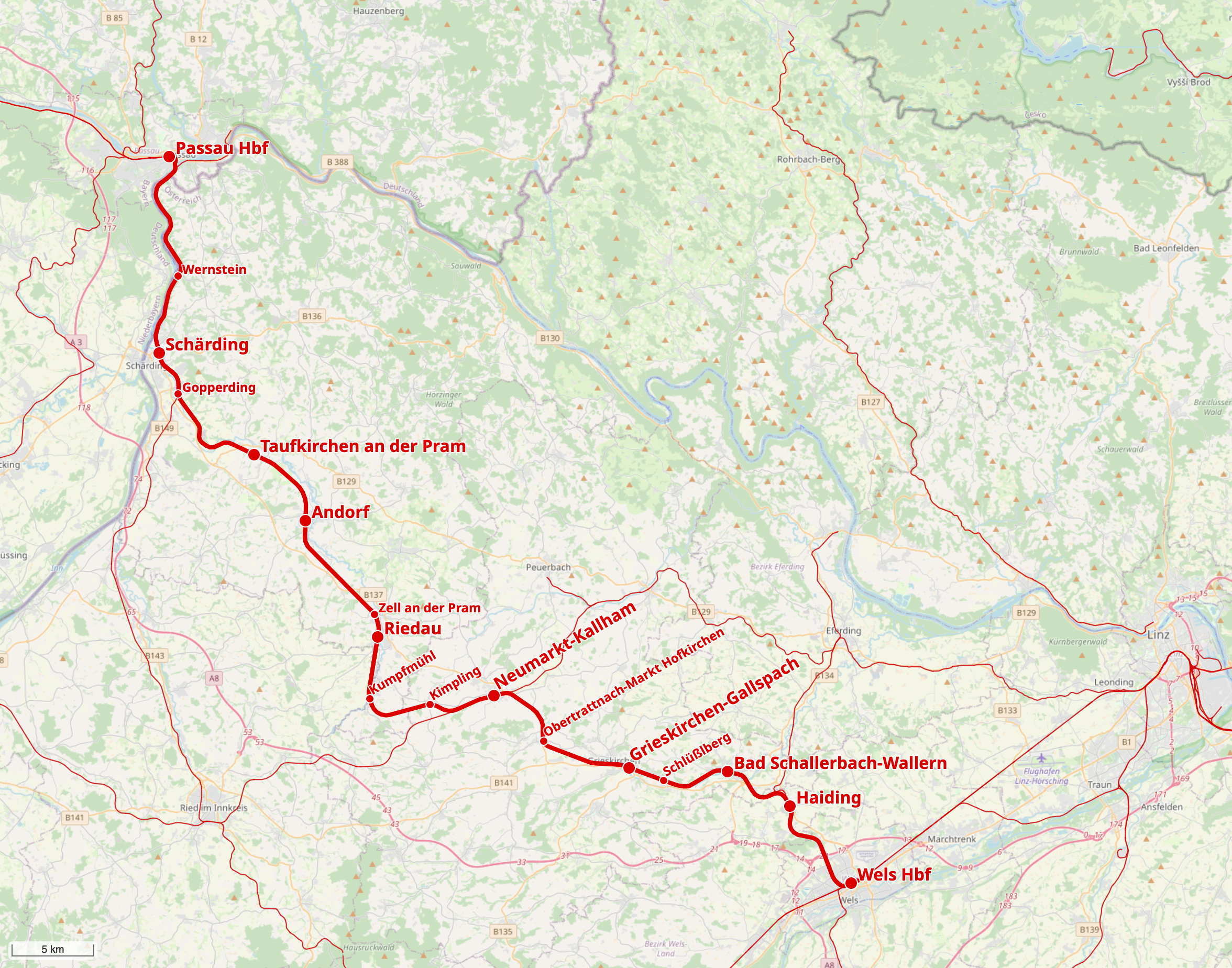
- Wels–Passau railway

Overview
- Line number: 205 01 (Austria); 5831 (Passau border–Passau Hbf)
- Locale: Austria and Germany

Service
- Route number: 150, 151

Technical
- Line length: 83 km (52 mi)
- Track gauge: 1,435 mm (4 ft 8 1/2 in) standard gauge
- Electrification: 15 kV/16.7 Hz AC overhead catenary
- Operating speed: 160 km/h (99.4 mph) (maximum)
- Maximum incline: 0.8%

The Wels–Passau railway—also called the Passauer Bahn ("Passau Railway") in German—is a two-track, electrified main line railway mainly in Austria, which was originally owned and operated by the k.k. privilegierte Kaiserin Elisabeth-Bahn ("Imperial and Royal privileged Empress Elisabeth Railway", KEB) company. It runs from Wels in Upper Austria to Passau in Bavaria and is part of the core network of the Austrian Federal Railways (Österreichischen Bundesbahnen, ÖBB).

== History ==
During the construction of the main line of Empress Elisabeth Railway, financial difficulties were encountered by the company. This caused a delay in the construction of the branch railway between Linz and Passau. The Bavarian Eastern Railway Company had already finished construction of the railway near the border, where the Austrian railway was supposed to be connected. On the other hand, the KEB had only undertaken project planning until the beginning of 1860. As a result, the terminus had to be changed to the Wels station because the line length was able to be shortened. The construction begann on 6 August 1860 and was completed by the KEB on 1 September 1861. It is an 81.2 km (83 km to the Passau freight yard) long double-track electrified main line. It runs through 79.6 km of Austrian territory and through 1.6 km of German territory, where it becomes the Regensburg–Passau railway in Passau station.

This line has particular significance for international freight traffic between Austria and northern Europe. International long-distance passenger traffic has also always been of great importance on the route from Hamburg and Frankfurt to Vienna and the east. Since about 1894, the Ostend–Vienna Express has operated via this line and in 1971 the Trans Europ Express Prinz Eugen ran between northern Germany and Vienna via this route; the route and the name were later used by a EuroCity service and an Intercity-Express (ICE). This received its name in 2002 and operated as a direct service between Hamburg and Vienna until late 2007, when it was closed. There has been a direct Hamburg-Vienna ICE service again since the timetable of 2011/2012.

A peculiarity of this line was that, until the opening of the branch line from Passau to Hauzenberg in 1904, the line on German soil was also controlled by an Austrian dispatcher. Until the accession of Austria to the European Union in 1995, there was a station at the end of the line in the Austrian part of Passau, where the necessary border and customs checks were carried out.

== Current operations ==
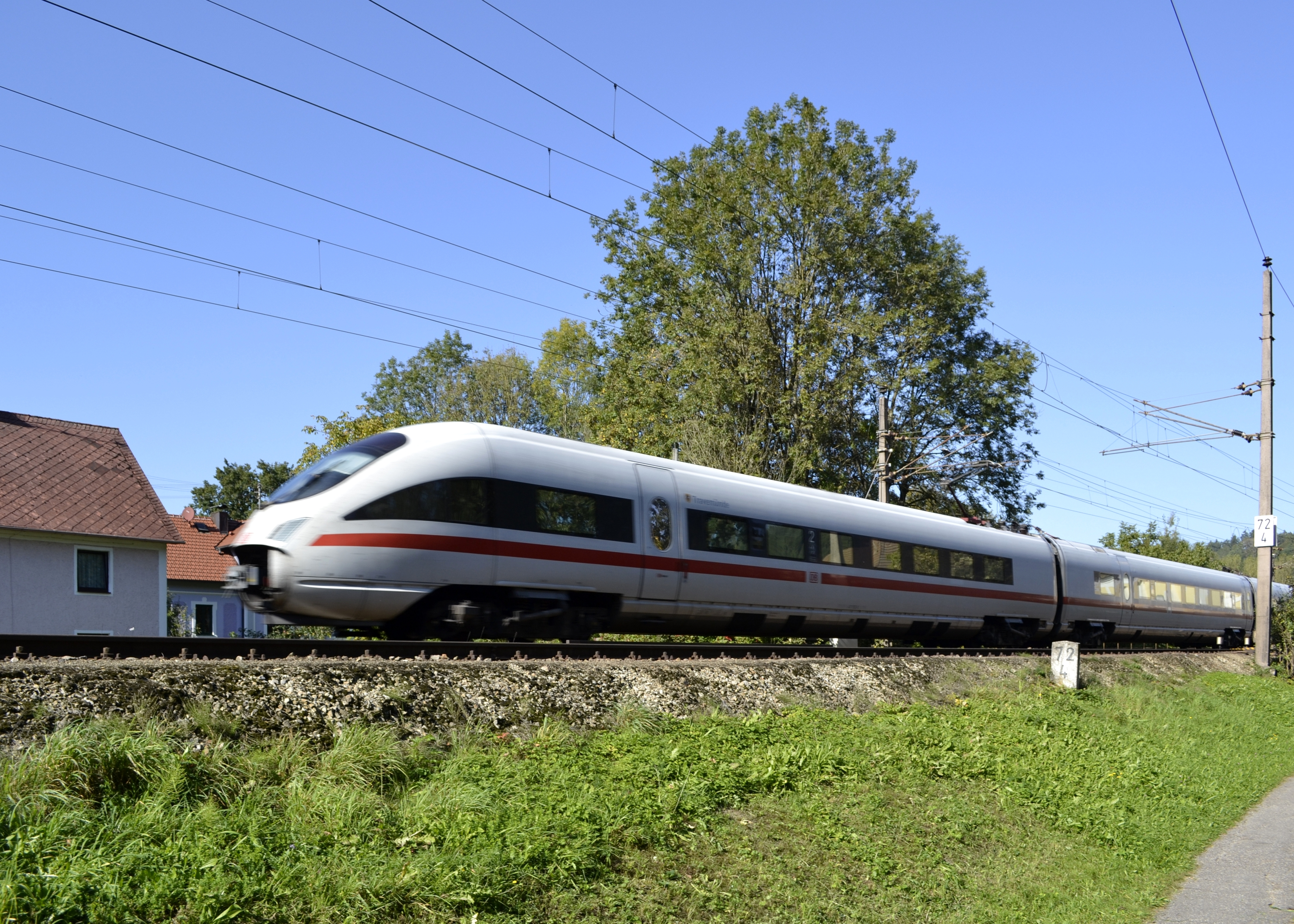
The running ICE train at Wernstein am Inn

Since the timetable change in December 2007, the international long-distance services between Frankfurt and Vienna have been operated in cooperation between DB and ÖBB using ICE T trains with tilting technology only. Curves on the Western Railway between Wels and Vienna line were improved to reduce the journey time for tilting trains between Frankfurt and Vienna. Apart from day services, the line is still used by an overnight train, which runs from Vienna to Hamburg, with a portion running to Cologne.

In addition to the international long-distance services on this route, there are also ÖBB local services at two-hour intervals, some of which continue to or start at Linz. These are currently operated with loco-hauled CityShuttle carriages. These will be replaced in the coming years by class 4024 railcars; currently only 4 pairs of services are operated with these Bombardier Talent sets. As a special feature, some local services have run between Vienna and Passau as trains with a Danube theme using historic rolling stock; this service has only run in the summer since the timetable change on 14 December 2008.

== Route ==
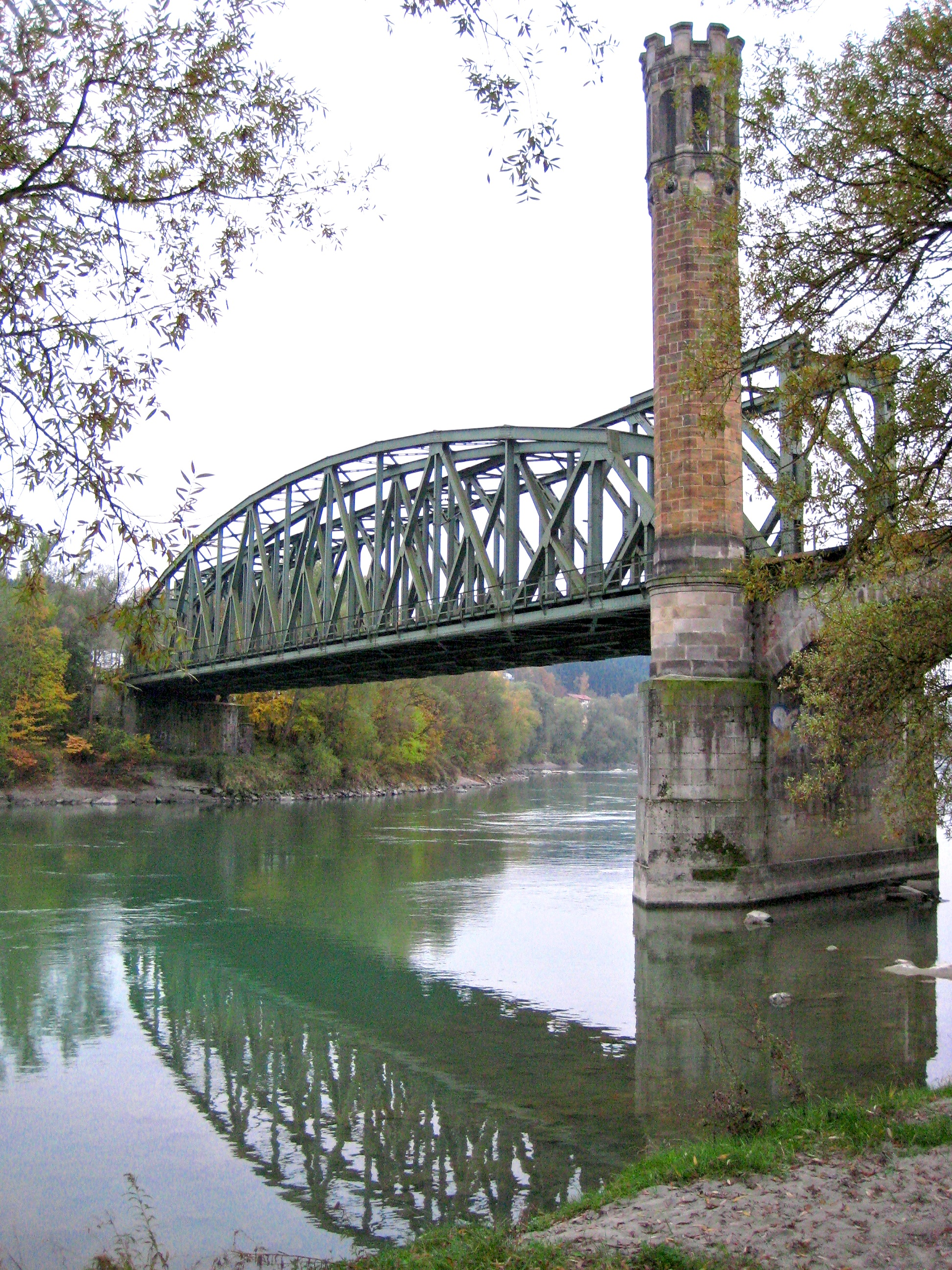
The Inn bridge at Passau

The line begins in Wels station, where it runs to the northwest, separating from the Western Railway, which continues to the southwest. Similarly to most of the line from Vienna to Linz, the line between Linz, Wels and Passau avoids the course of the Danube. First, the line runs through the wide Traun valley and the Wels heath near Puchberg and follows the course of the Trattnach river from Bad Schallerbach to Taufkirchen. The Innviertel Railway branches off to Ried im Innkreis in Neumarkt im Hausruckkreis. The line runs in a wide curve to avoid gradients through the local Asbach valley to Zell an der Pram. From Zell it goes along the valley of the Pram to the Inn, which it reaches at Schärding. Shortly before Schärding at St. Florian am Inn, the line meets another branch line from Ried (the Salzkammergut Railway). The line now follows the right (east) bank of the Inn. After the German border the branch line to Hauzenberg branches off. Immediately afterwards the line crosses the Inn river on a 110 metre long iron bridge, which was built after the Second World War, replacing the former 176 metre long stone bridge. After that the line passes through the short Passau tunnel under the Passau Neue Mitte (new centre) project (which was formerly occupied by a small parade ground) and ends in Passau Hauptbahnhof (Hauptbahnhof). There it becomes the Passau−Regensburg railway, running along the Danube.
