= Sankt Thomas, Austria =

Sankt Thomas
- Municipality
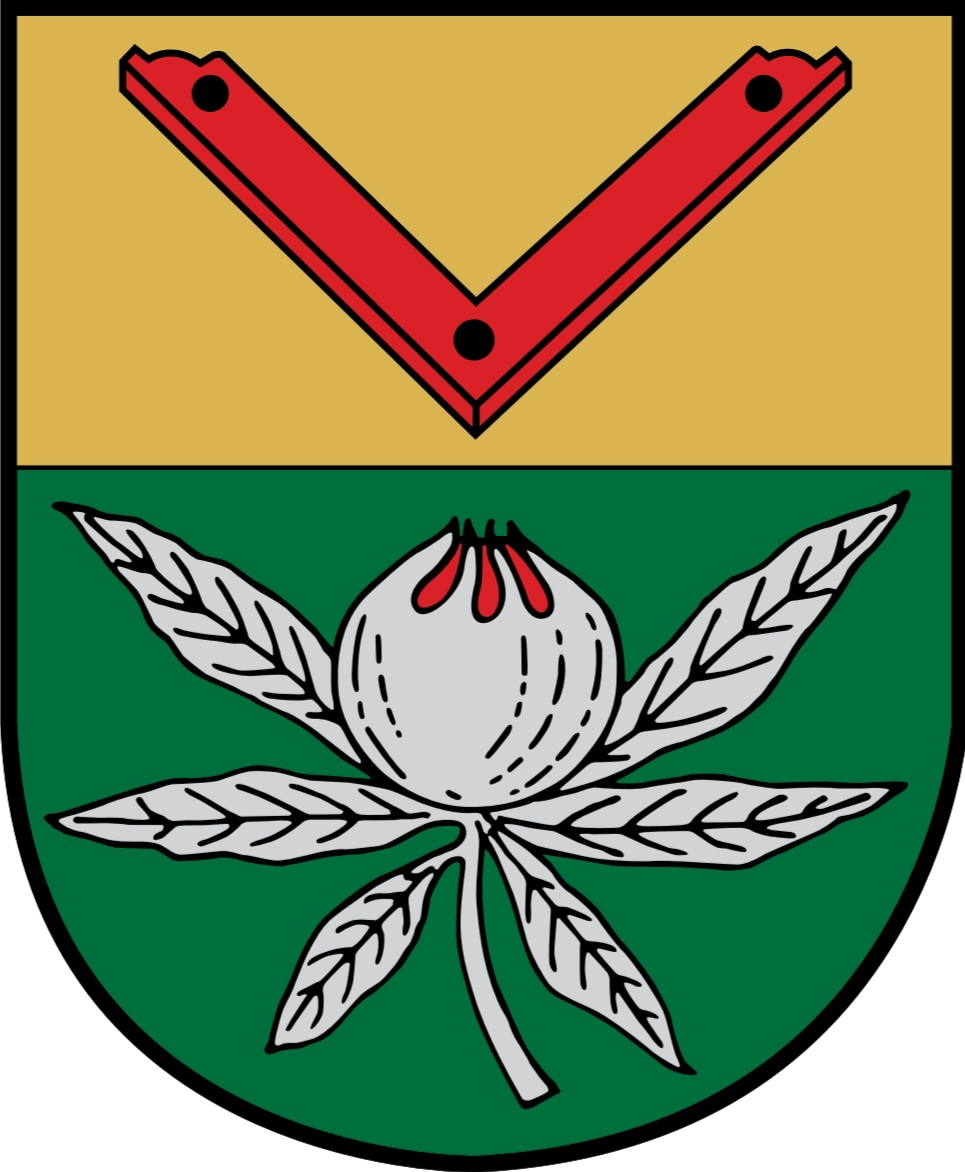
- Coat of arms

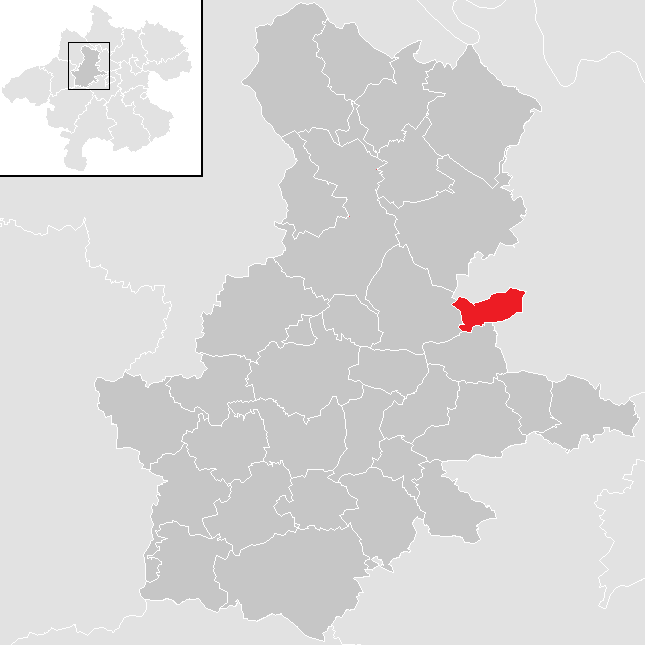
- Location in the district

- Location within Austria
- Coordinates: 48°17′09″N 13°52′55″E
- Country: Austria
- State: Upper Austria
- District: Grieskirchen

Government
  - Mayor: Josef Lehner (ÖVP)

Area
  - Total: 6.08 km^{2} (2.35 sq mi)

Population (2018-01-01)
  - Total: 545
  - Density: 89.6/km^{2} (232/sq mi)
- Time zone: UTC+1 (CET)
  - Summer (DST): UTC+2 (CEST)
- Postal code: 4732
- Area code: 07277
- Vehicle registration: GR
- Website: www.sankt-thomas.at

Sankt Thomas (Austrian German pronunciation: [saŋkt ˈtoːmas]) is a municipality in the Grieskirchen district of Upper Austria.

== Geography ==
Sankt Thomas lies in the Hausruckviertel. About 10 percent of the municipality is forest, and 82 percent is farmland.
