= Kallham =

- Municipality
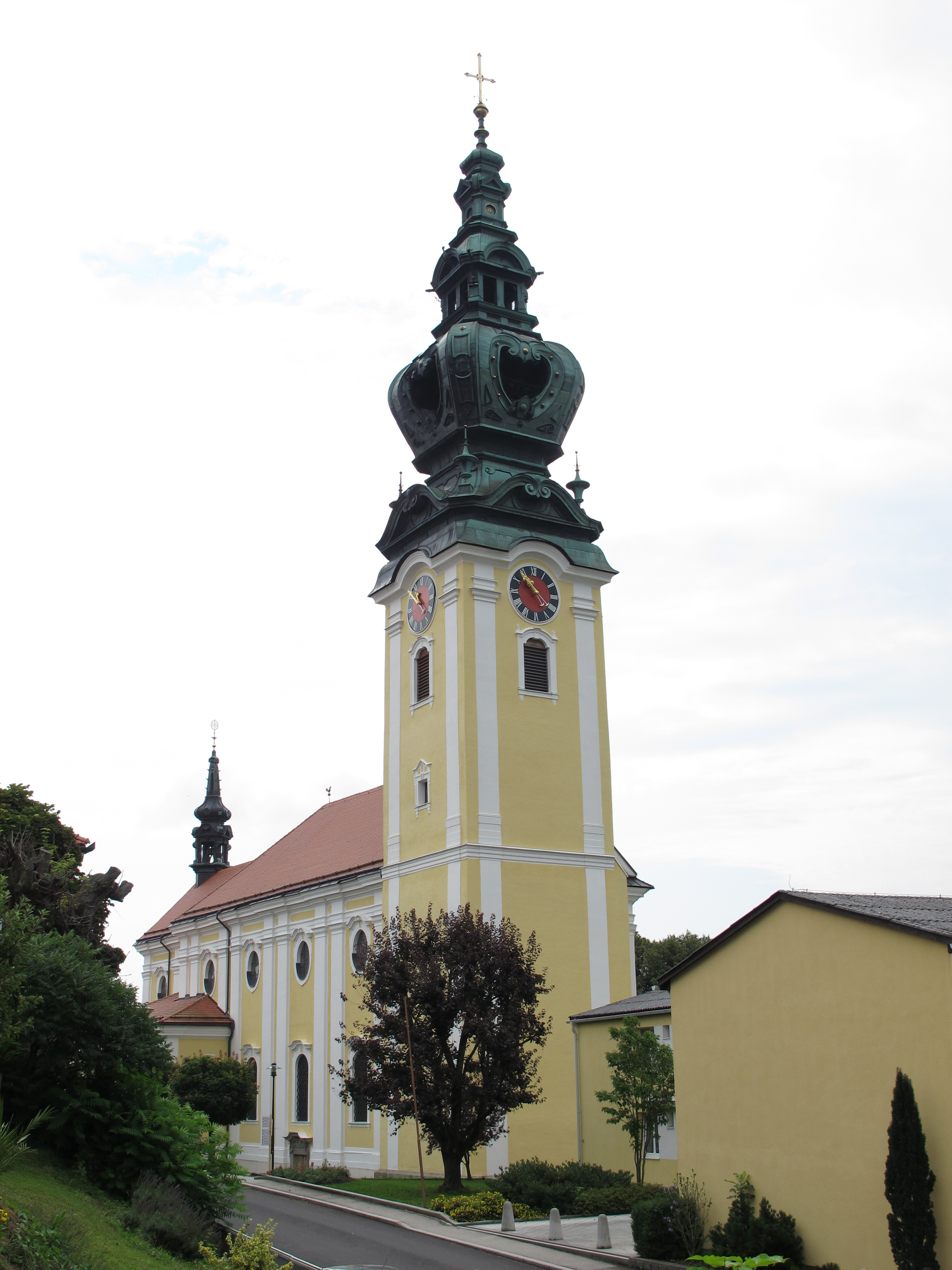

- Coat of arms

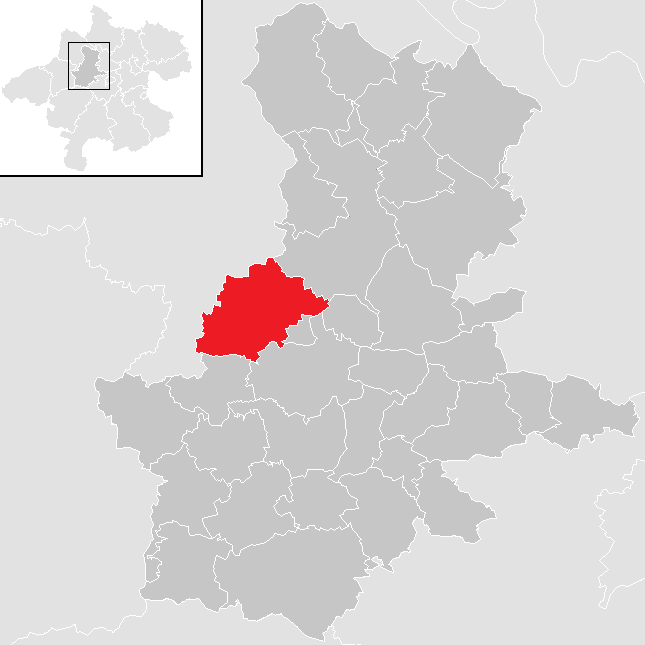
- Location in the district

- Location within Austria
- Coordinates: 48°17′02″N 13°42′53″E
- Country: Austria
- State: Upper Austria
- District: Grieskirchen

Government
  - Mayor: Gottfried Pauzenberger (ÖVP)

Area
  - Total: 26.73 km^{2} (10.32 sq mi)
- Elevation: 397 m (1,302 ft)

Population (2018-01-01)
  - Total: 2,498
  - Density: 93.45/km^{2} (242.0/sq mi)
- Time zone: UTC+1 (CET)
  - Summer (DST): UTC+2 (CEST)
- Postal code: 4720
- Area code: 07733
- Vehicle registration: GR
- Website: www.kallham.ooe.gv.at

Kallham is a municipality in the district of Grieskirchen in the Austrian state of Upper Austria.

== Geography ==
Kallham lies in the Hausruckviertel. About 10 percent of the municipality is forest, and 79 percent is farmland.
