= Potting =

Potting may refer to:

- Potting, in pottery, the making of pots, generally on the potter's wheel
- Potting (electronics), the encapsulation of electronic components
- In farming and gardening, potting is planting a plant in a pot, such as a flowerpot
  - Sowing in greenhouses or polytunnels is often done in pots, pending later transplant
    - Potting soil is a type of soil tailored to this use
    - Potting on (or potting up) is the act of moving the plant, with its root ball, to a larger pot
  - In a container garden, the plants remain potted throughout their lives
- In food preservation, potting is putting food in containers and sealing them with a fluid which solidifies:
  - Foods coverd with fat are discussed in potted meat
  - Foods covered with a gel are covere in Food preservation § Jellying
- Pot (cue sports), in cue sports, to sink a ball into a pocket

== See also ==
- Pötting is a municipality in the Austrian state of Upper Austria
