= Weibern, Austria =

Weibern
- Municipality
- Coat of arms

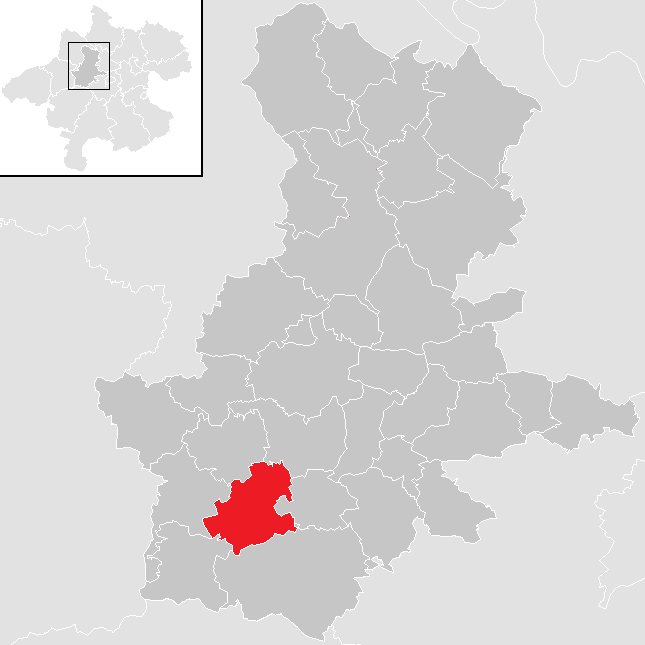
- Location in the district

- Location within Austria
- Coordinates: 48°11′08″N 13°42′13″E
- Country: Austria
- State: Upper Austria
- District: Grieskirchen

Government
  - Mayor: Manfred Roitinger (ÖVP)

Area
  - Total: 17.47 km^{2} (6.75 sq mi)
- Elevation: 441 m (1,447 ft)

Population (2018-01-01)
  - Total: 1,717
  - Density: 98.28/km^{2} (254.6/sq mi)
- Time zone: UTC+1 (CET)
  - Summer (DST): UTC+2 (CEST)
- Postal code: 4675
- Area code: 07732
- Vehicle registration: GR
- Website: www.weibern.at

Weibern (German pronunciation: [ˈvaɪbɐn]) is a municipality in the district of Grieskirchen in the Austrian state of Upper Austria.

== Geography ==
Weibern lies in the Hausruckviertel. About 11 percent of the municipality is forest, and 76 percent is farmland.
