= Aistersheim =

- Municipality
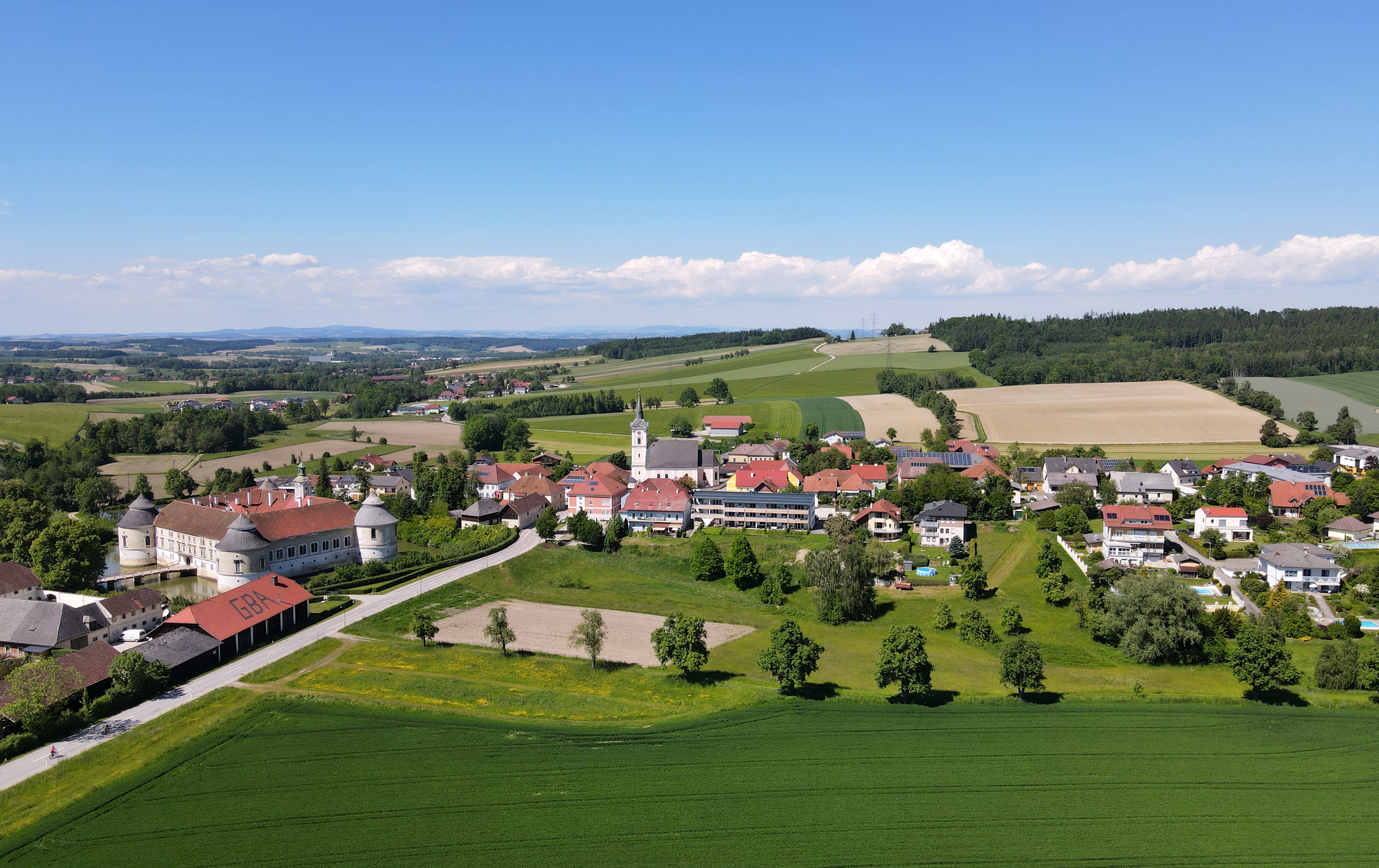
- Aerial view of Aistersheim

- Coat of arms

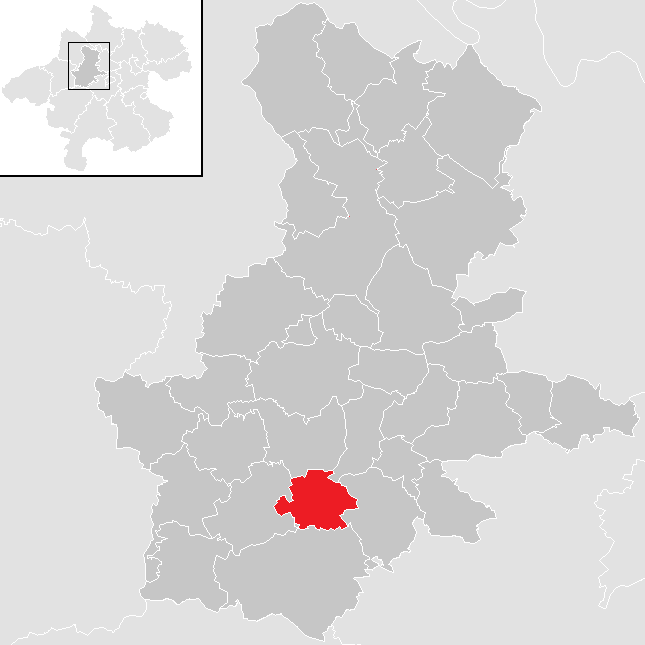
- Location in the district

- Location within Austria
- Coordinates: 48°10′0″N 13°45′0″E
- Country: Austria
- State: Upper Austria
- District: Grieskirchen

Government
  - Mayor: Rudolf Riener (ÖVP)

Area
  - Total: 11.11 km^{2} (4.29 sq mi)
- Elevation: 437 m (1,434 ft)

Population (2018-01-01)
  - Total: 892
  - Density: 80.3/km^{2} (208/sq mi)
- Time zone: UTC+1 (CET)
  - Summer (DST): UTC+2 (CEST)
- Postal code: 4676
- Area code: 07734
- Vehicle registration: GR
- Website: www.aistersheim.at

Aistersheim is a municipality in the district of Grieskirchen in the Austrian state of Upper Austria.

== Geography ==
Aistersheim lies in the Hausruckviertel. About 26 percent of the municipality is forest, and 67 percent is farmland.
