= Bruck-Waasen =

- Municipality
- Coat of arms

- Location within Austria
- Coordinates: 48°17′0″N 13°46′0″E
- Country: Austria
- State: Upper Austria
- District: Grieskirchen

Area
  - Total: 28.4 km^{2} (11.0 sq mi)
- Elevation: 377 m (1,237 ft)

Population (14 June 2016)
  - Total: 2,317
  - Density: 81.6/km^{2} (211/sq mi)
- Time zone: UTC+1 (CET)
  - Summer (DST): UTC+2 (CEST)
- Postal code: 4722
- Area code: 07276
- Vehicle registration: GR
- Website: www.bruck-waasen.ooe.gv.at

Bruck-Waasen was a municipality in the district of Grieskirchen in the Austrian state of Upper Austria.

== Geography ==
Bruck-Waasen was lying in the Hausruckviertel. About 10 percent of the municipality is forest, and 80 percent is farmland.
