= Kematen =

Kematen may refer to the following places in Austria:

- Kematen am Innbach, Upper Austria
- Kematen an der Krems, Upper Austria
- Kematen in Tirol, Tyrol
- Kematen an der Ybbs, Lower Austria
