= Eschenau im Hausruckkreis =

- Municipality
- Coat of arms

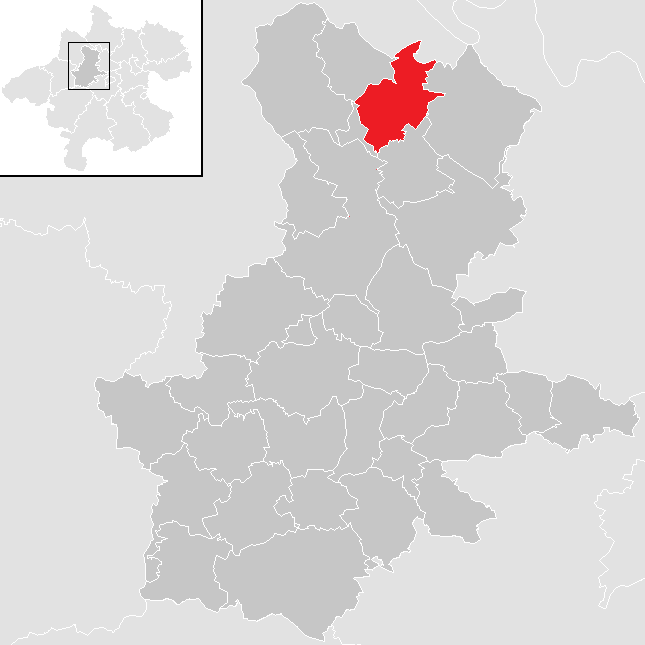
- Location in the district

- Location within Austria
- Coordinates: 48°22′0″N 13°49′0″E
- Country: Austria
- State: Upper Austria
- District: Grieskirchen

Government
  - Mayor: Hannes Humer (ÖVP)

Area
  - Total: 16.61 km^{2} (6.41 sq mi)
- Elevation: 380 m (1,250 ft)

Population (2018-01-01)
  - Total: 1,063
  - Density: 64.00/km^{2} (165.8/sq mi)
- Time zone: UTC+1 (CET)
  - Summer (DST): UTC+2 (CEST)
- Postal code: 4724
- Area code: 07278
- Vehicle registration: GR

Eschenau im Hausruckkreis is a municipality in the district of Grieskirchen in the Austrian state of Upper Austria.

== Geography ==
Eschenau lies in the Hausruckviertel. About 22 percent of the municipality is forest, and 71 percent is farmland.
