= Steegen =

- Municipality
- Coat of arms

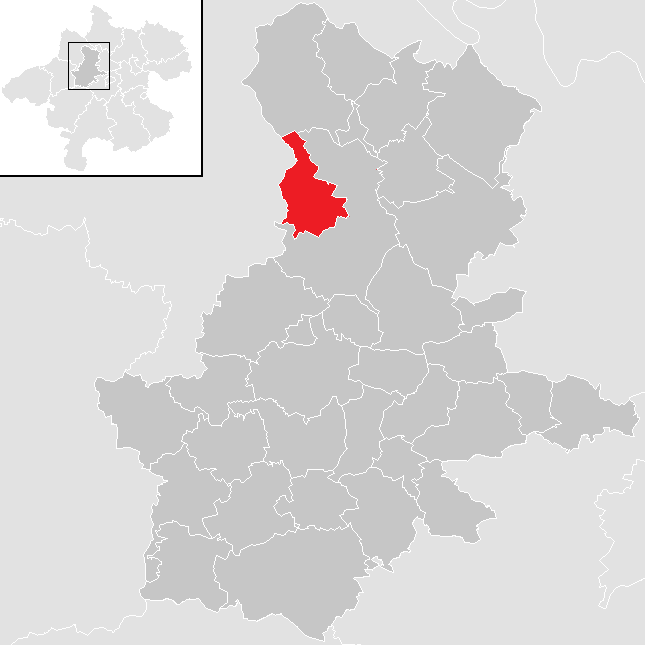
- Location in the district

- Location within Austria
- Coordinates: 48°20′24″N 13°45′55″E
- Country: Austria
- State: Upper Austria
- District: Grieskirchen

Government
  - Mayor: Kurt Friedwagner (ÖVP)

Area
  - Total: 13.2 km^{2} (5.1 sq mi)
- Elevation: 380 m (1,250 ft)

Population (2018-01-01)
  - Total: 1,049
  - Density: 79.5/km^{2} (206/sq mi)
- Time zone: UTC+1 (CET)
  - Summer (DST): UTC+2 (CEST)
- Postal code: 4722
- Area code: 07276
- Vehicle registration: GR
- Website: www.steegen.at

Steegen is a municipality in the district of Grieskirchen in the Austrian state of Upper Austria.

== Geography ==
Steegen lies in the Hausruckviertel. About 9 percent of the municipality is forest, and 82 percent is farmland.
