= Michael Stifel =

German mathematician (1487–1567)

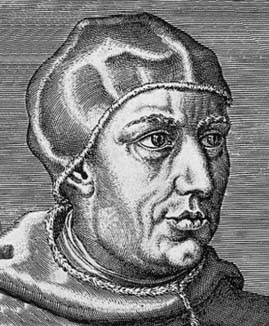
- Contemporain gravure of Michael Stifel
- Born: 1487; Esslingen
- Died: April 19, 1567 (aged 79–80); Jena
- Education: University of Wittenberg
- Known for: Arithmetica integra (containing an early version of logarithms)
- Scientific career
- Fields: Theology, mathematics
- Workplaces: University of Jena

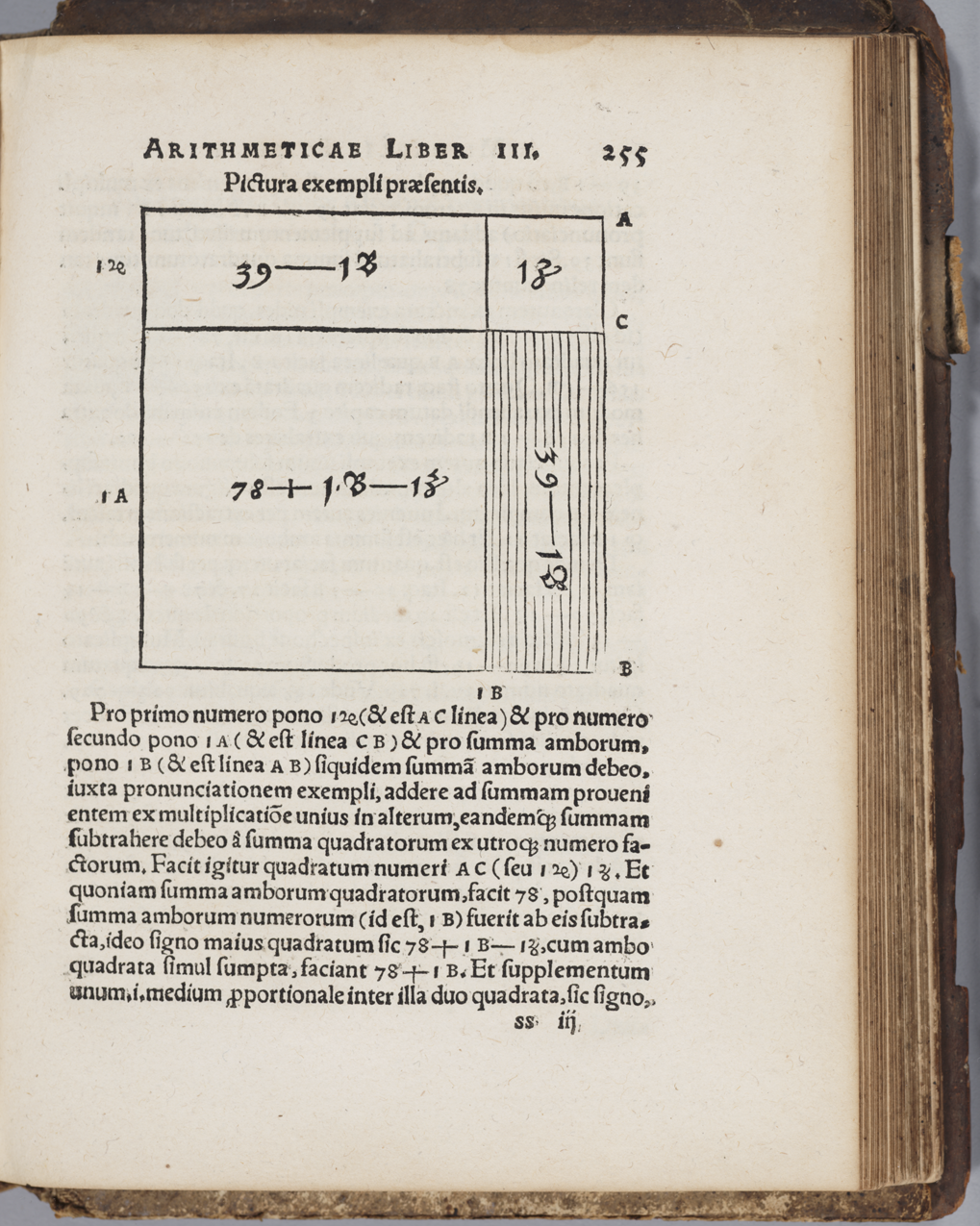
Michael Stifel's Arithmetica Integra (1544), p. 225.

Michael Stifel or Styfel (1487 – April 19, 1567) was a German monk, Protestant reformer and mathematician. He was an Augustinian who became an early supporter of Martin Luther. He was later appointed professor of mathematics at Jena University.

== Life ==
Stifel was born in Esslingen am Neckar in southern Germany. He joined the Order of Saint Augustine and was ordained a priest in 1511. Tensions in the abbey grew after he published the poem Von der Christförmigen, rechtgegründeten leer Doctoris Martini Luthers (1522, i.e. On the Christian, righteous doctrine of Doctor Martin Luther) and came into conflict with Thomas Murner. Stifel then left for Frankfurt, and soon went to Mansfeld, where he began his mathematical studies. In 1524, upon a recommendation by Luther, Stifel was called by the Jörger family to serve at their residence, Tollet Castle in Tollet (close to Grieskirchen, Upper Austria). Due to the tense situation in the Archduchy of Austria in the wake of the execution of Leonhard Kaiser in Schärding, Stifel returned to Wittenberg in 1527. At this time Stifel started writing a book collecting letter transcripts of Martin Luther, completed in 1534.

By intercession of Martin Luther, Stifel became minister in Lochau (now Annaburg). Luther also confirmed his marriage to the widow of his predecessor in the ministry. Michael Stifel was fascinated regarding the properties and possibilities of numbers; he studied number theory and numerology. He also performed the "Wortrechnung" (i.e. word-calculation), studying the statistical properties of letters and words in the bible (a common method at that time). In 1532, Stifel published anonymously his "Ein Rechenbuchlin vom EndChrist. Apocalyps in Apocalypsim" (A Book of Arithmetic about the AntiChrist. A Revelation in the Revelation). This predicted that Judgement Day would occur and the world would end at 8am on October 19, 1533. When this prediction failed, he did not make any other predictions.

In 1535 he became minister in Holzdorf near Wittenberg and stayed there for 12 years. He studied "Die Coss" (the first algebra book written in German) by Christoph Rudolff and Euclid's Elements in the Latin edition by Campanus of Novara. Jacob Milich supported his scientific development and encouraged him to write a comprehensive work on arithmetic and algebra. In 1541 he registered for mathematics at the University of Wittenberg to extend his mathematical knowledge. In 1558 Stifel became first professor of mathematics at the new founded University of Jena.

== Mathematics ==
Stifel's most important work Arithmetica integra (1544) contained important innovations in mathematical notation. It has the first use of multiplication by juxtaposition (with no symbol between the terms) in Europe. He is the first to use the term "exponent" and also included the following rules for calculating powers: $q^m q^n = q^{m+n}$ and $\tfrac{q^m}{q^n} = q^{m-n}$.

The book contains a table of integers and powers of 2 that some have considered to be an early version of a logarithmic table. Stifel explicitly points out, that multiplication and division operations in the (lower) geometric series can be mapped by addition and subtraction in the (upper) arithmetic series. On the following page 250, he shows examples also using negative exponents. He also realized that this would create a lot of work. So he wrote, that regarding this issue marvelous books could be written, but he himself will refrain and keep his eyes shut.

Stifel was the first, who had a standard method to solve quadratic equations. He was able to reduce the different cases known to one case, because he uses both, positive and negative coefficients. He called his method/rule AMASIAS. The letters A, M, A/S, I, A/S each are representing a single operation step when solving a quadratic equation. Stifel, however avoided showing the negative results.

Another topic dealt with in the Arithmetica integra are negative numbers (which Stifel calls numeri absurdi). Negative numbers were refused and considered as preposterous by the authorities at that time. Stifel however, used negative numbers in the same manner as the other numbers. He also discussed the properties of irrational numbers and if the irrationals are real numbers, or only fictitious (AI page 103). Stifel found them very useful for mathematics, and not dispensable. Further issues were a method of calculating roots of higher order by using binomial coefficients and sequences.

== Publications ==
- Anon (1532). Ein Rechenbuchlin vom EndChrist: Apocalyps in Apocalypsim [A Book of Arithmetic about the AntiChrist: A Revelation in the Revelation] (in German).
- Arithmetica integra [Complete arithmetic] (in Latin). Nuremberg: Johann Petreium. 1544.

Translations

- Arithmetica integra / Vollständiger Lehrgang der Arithmetik (in German). Translated by Eberhard Knobloch; Otto Schönberger. Würzburg: Königshausen & Neumann. 2007 [1544]. ISBN 978-3-8260-3561-6.
