= Pram, Austria =

Pram
- Municipality
- Coat of arms

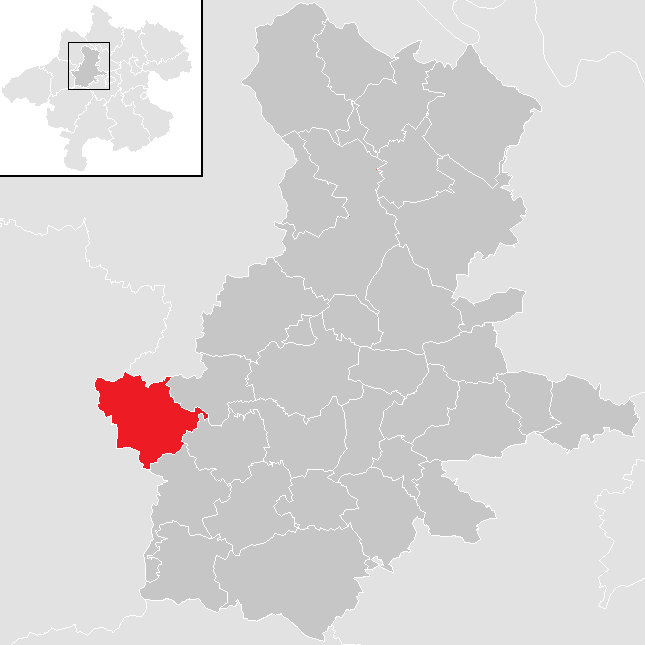
- Location in the district

- Location within Austria
- Coordinates: 48°14′06″N 13°36′24″E
- Country: Austria
- State: Upper Austria
- District: Grieskirchen

Government
  - Mayor: Erwin Repitz (ÖVP)

Area
  - Total: 20.31 km^{2} (7.84 sq mi)
- Elevation: 435 m (1,427 ft)

Population (2018-01-01)
  - Total: 1,708
  - Density: 84.10/km^{2} (217.8/sq mi)
- Time zone: UTC+1 (CET)
  - Summer (DST): UTC+2 (CEST)
- Postal code: 4742
- Area code: 07736
- Vehicle registration: GR
- Website: www.pram.at

Pram is a municipality in the district of Grieskirchen in the Austrian state of Upper Austria.

== Geography ==
Pram lies in the Hausruckviertel. About 9 percent of the municipality is forest, and 82 percent is farmland.
