= Rottenbach, Austria =

Rottenbach
- Municipality
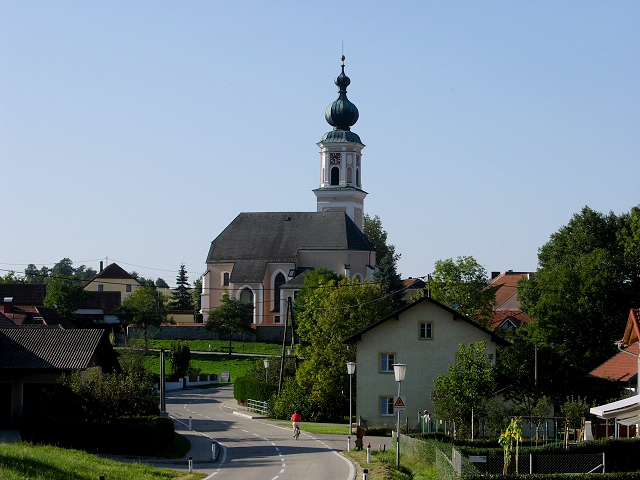

- Coat of arms

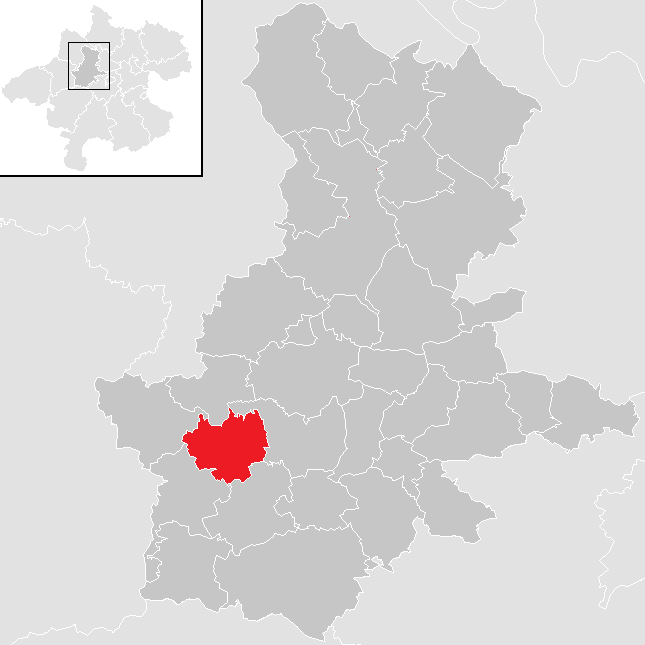
- Location in the district

- Location within Austria
- Coordinates: 48°12′22″N 13°40′52″E
- Country: Austria
- State: Upper Austria
- District: Grieskirchen

Government
  - Mayor: Alois Stadlmayr (ÖVP)

Area
  - Total: 14.59 km^{2} (5.63 sq mi)
- Elevation: 424 m (1,391 ft)

Population (2018-01-01)
  - Total: 1,105
  - Density: 75.74/km^{2} (196.2/sq mi)
- Time zone: UTC+1 (CET)
  - Summer (DST): UTC+2 (CEST)
- Postal code: 4681
- Area code: 07732
- Vehicle registration: GR
- Website: www.rottenbach.gv.at

Rottenbach (Austrian German pronunciation: [ˈrɔtn̩ˌbax]) is a municipality in the district of Grieskirchen in the Austrian state of Upper Austria.

== Geography ==
Rottenbach lies in the Hausruckviertel. About 10 percent of the municipality is forest, and 82 percent is farmland.
