= Meggenhofen =

- Municipality
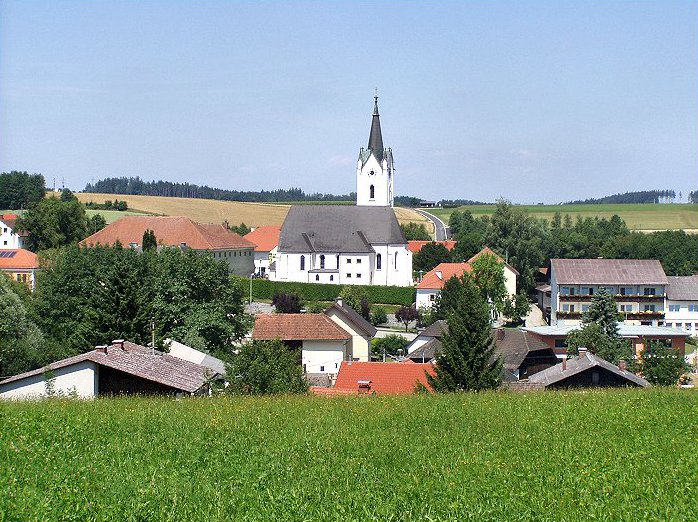

- Coat of arms

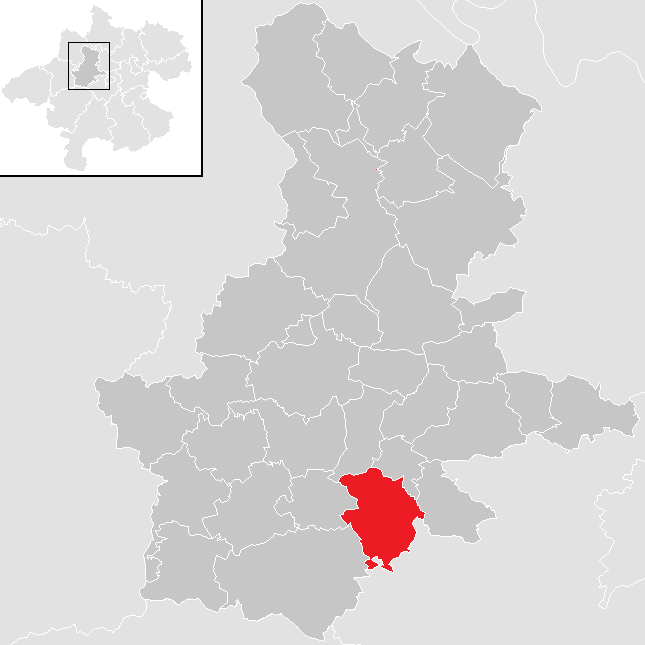
- Location in the district

- Location within Austria
- Coordinates: 48°10′53″N 13°47′47″E
- Country: Austria
- State: Upper Austria
- District: Grieskirchen

Government
  - Mayor: Heinz Oberndorfer (ÖVP)

Area
  - Total: 18.21 km^{2} (7.03 sq mi)
- Elevation: 390 m (1,280 ft)

Population (2018-01-01)
  - Total: 1,514
  - Density: 83.14/km^{2} (215.3/sq mi)
- Time zone: UTC+1 (CET)
  - Summer (DST): UTC+2 (CEST)
- Postal code: 4714
- Area code: 07247
- Vehicle registration: GR
- Website: www.meggenhofen.at

Meggenhofen is a municipality in the district of Grieskirchen in the Austrian state of Upper Austria.

== Geography ==
Meggenhofen lies in the Hausruckviertel. About 14 percent of the municipality is forest, and 76 percent is farmland.
