= Waizenkirchen =

- Municipality
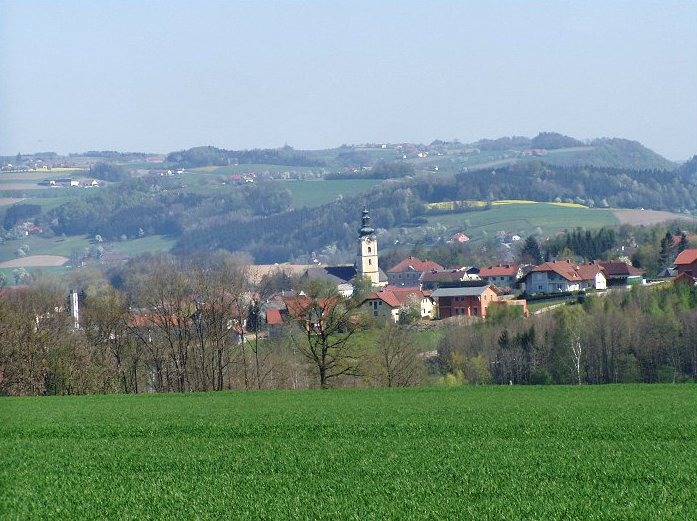

- Coat of arms

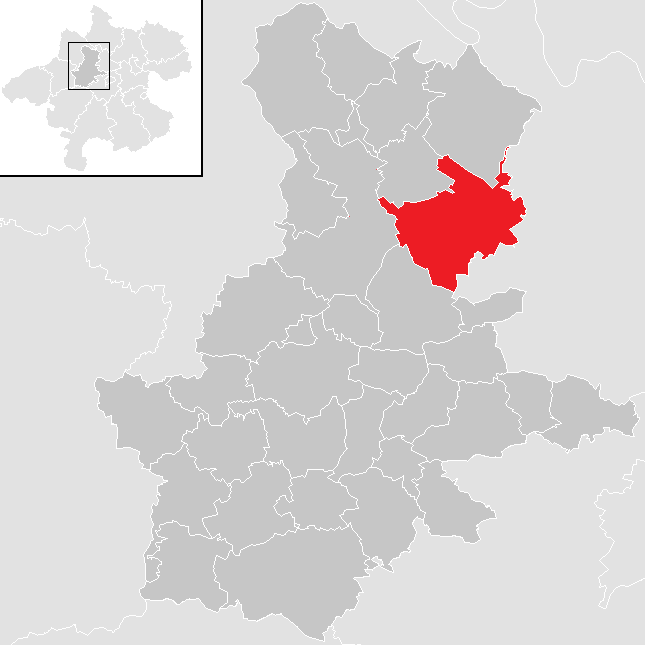
- Location in the district

- Location within Austria
- Coordinates: 48°19′49″N 13°51′30″E
- Country: Austria
- State: Upper Austria
- District: Grieskirchen

Government
  - Mayor: Fabian Grüneis (ÖVP)

Area
  - Total: 34.25 km^{2} (13.22 sq mi)
- Elevation: 367 m (1,204 ft)

Population (2018-01-01)
  - Total: 3,729
  - Density: 108.9/km^{2} (282.0/sq mi)
- Time zone: UTC+1 (CET)
  - Summer (DST): UTC+2 (CEST)
- Postal code: 4730
- Area code: 07277
- Vehicle registration: GR
- Website: www.waizenkirchen.at

Waizenkirchen is a municipality in the district of Grieskirchen in the Austrian state of Upper Austria.

== Geography ==
Waizenkirchen lies in the Hausruckviertel. About 10 percent of the municipality is forest, and 80 percent is farmland.

== History ==
On 4 May 1945, when a parked tank at the 1st Battalion Command Post caught fire, putting nearby vehicles at risk from flames and exploding ammunition, Technician 5th Grade Eugene B. Spade from Major General Stanley Eric Reinhart's 261st Infantry Regiment raced through bursting 90-mm shells and .50 caliber cartridges to prevent a disaster.

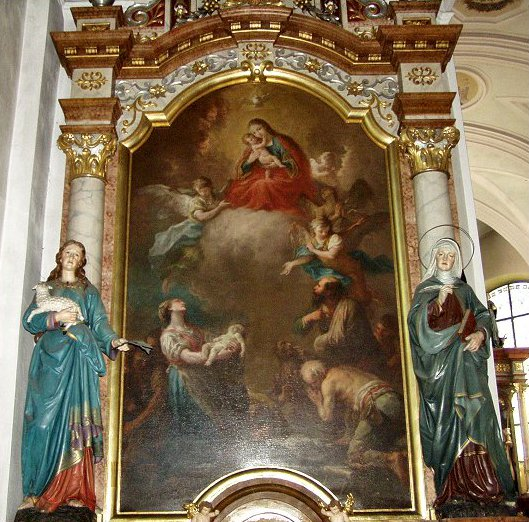
Mary, Help of Christians, Saints Peter and Paul Parish Church, Waizenkirchen

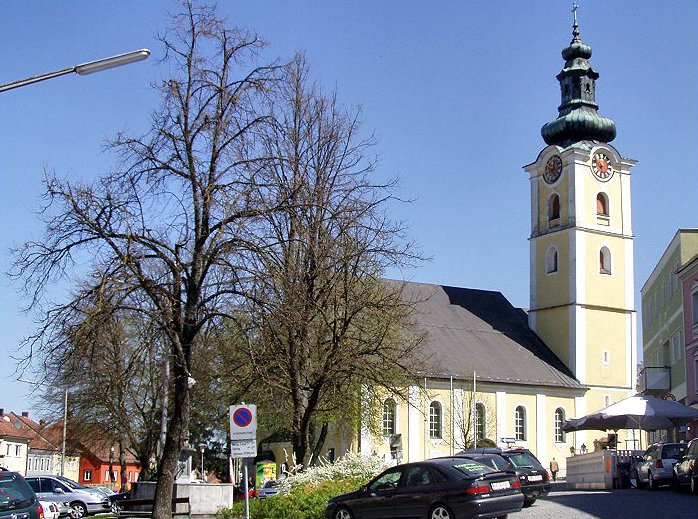
Parish Church
