= Wendling, Grieskirchen =

Wendling
- Municipality
- Coat of arms

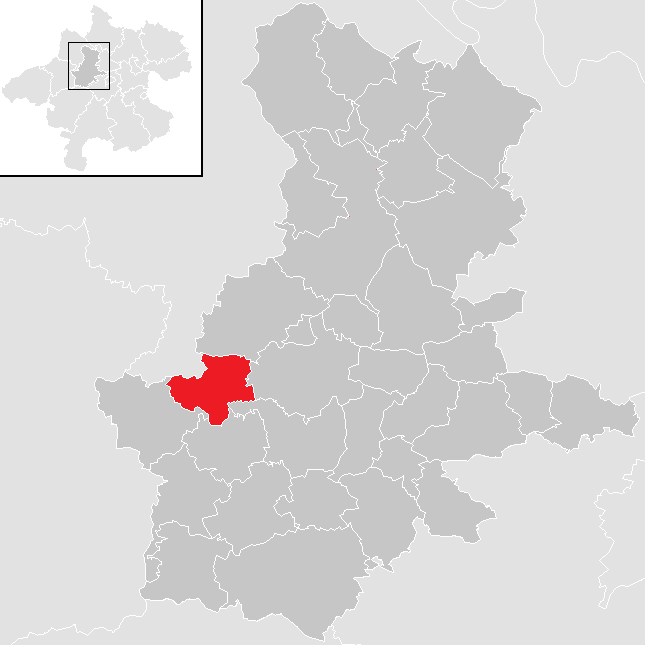
- Location in the district

- Location within Austria
- Coordinates: 48°13′51″N 13°40′00″E
- Country: Austria
- State: Upper Austria
- District: Grieskirchen

Government
  - Mayor: Ulrich Baumgartner-Flotzinger (ÖVP)

Area
  - Total: 12.83 km^{2} (4.95 sq mi)
- Elevation: 400 m (1,300 ft)

Population (2018-01-01)
  - Total: 838
  - Density: 65.3/km^{2} (169/sq mi)
- Time zone: UTC+1 (CET)
  - Summer (DST): UTC+2 (CEST)
- Postal code: 4741
- Area code: 07736
- Vehicle registration: GR
- Website: www.tiscover.at/wendling

Wendling is a municipality in the district of Grieskirchen in the Austrian state of Upper Austria.

== Geography ==
Wendling lies in the Hausruckviertel. About 9 percent of the municipality is forest, and 79 percent is farmland.
