= Schlüßlberg =

- Municipality
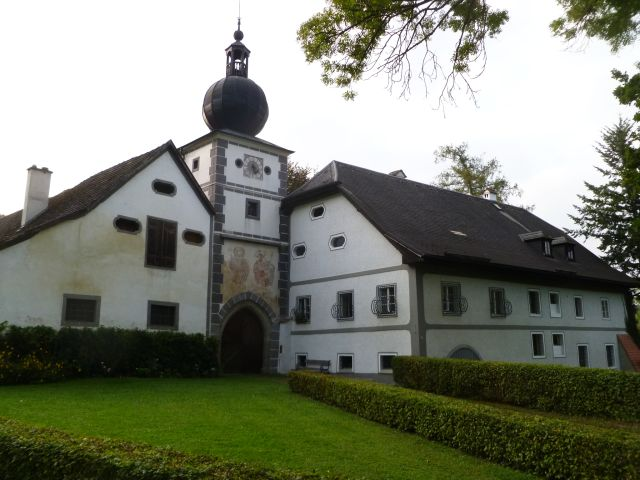
- Castle gate tower

- Coat of arms

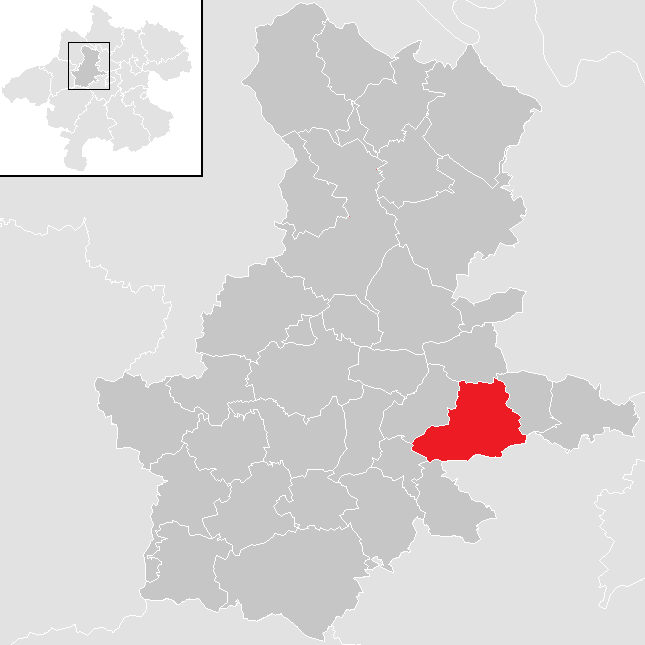
- Location in the district

- Location within Austria
- Coordinates: 48°13′10″N 13°52′21″E
- Country: Austria
- State: Upper Austria
- District: Grieskirchen

Government
  - Mayor: Klaus Höllerl (SPÖ)

Area
  - Total: 19.87 km^{2} (7.67 sq mi)
- Elevation: 320 m (1,050 ft)

Population (2018-01-01)
  - Total: 3,091
  - Density: 155.6/km^{2} (402.9/sq mi)
- Time zone: UTC+1 (CET)
  - Summer (DST): UTC+2 (CEST)
- Postal code: 4707
- Area code: 07248
- Vehicle registration: GR
- Website: www.schluesslberg.ooe.gv.at

Schlüßlberg is a municipality in the district of Grieskirchen in the Austrian state of Upper Austria.

== Geography ==
Schlüßlberg lies in the Hausruckviertel. About 15 percent of the municipality is forest, and 74 percent is farmland.
