= Heiligenberg, Austria =

Heiligenberg
- Municipality
- Coat of arms

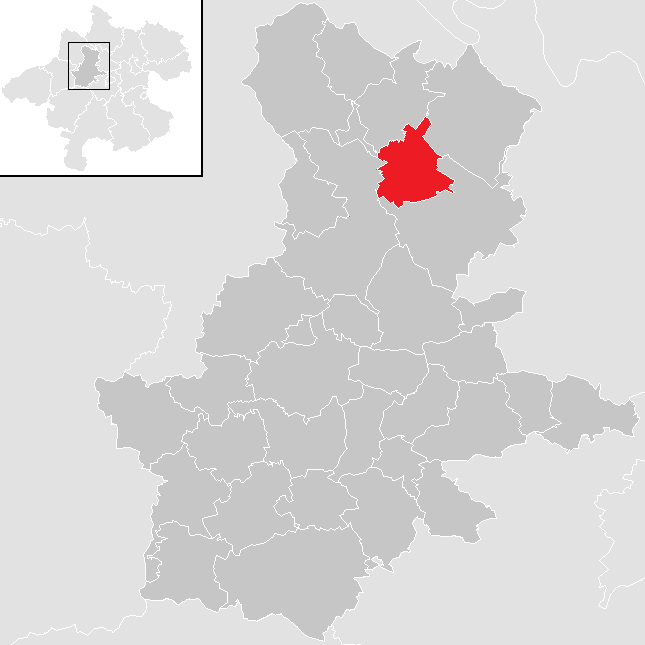
- Location in the district

- Location within Austria
- Coordinates: 48°21′18″N 13°49′23″E
- Country: Austria
- State: Upper Austria
- District: Grieskirchen

Government
  - Mayor: Manfred Haslehner (ÖVP)

Area
  - Total: 13.86 km^{2} (5.35 sq mi)
- Elevation: 398 m (1,306 ft)

Population (2018-01-01)
  - Total: 691
  - Density: 49.9/km^{2} (129/sq mi)
- Time zone: UTC+1 (CET)
  - Summer (DST): UTC+2 (CEST)
- Postal code: 4733
- Area code: 07277
- Vehicle registration: GR
- Website: www.heiligenberg. ooe.gv.at

Heiligenberg is a municipality in the district of Grieskirchen in the Austrian state of Upper Austria.

== Geography ==
Heiligenberg lies in the Hausruckviertel. About 14 percent of the municipality is forest, and 79 percent is farmland.
