= Haag am Hausruck =

- Municipality
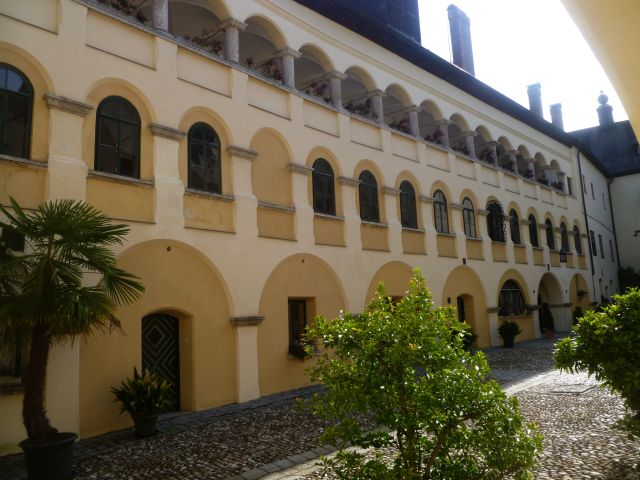
- The Kings Courtyard

- Coat of arms

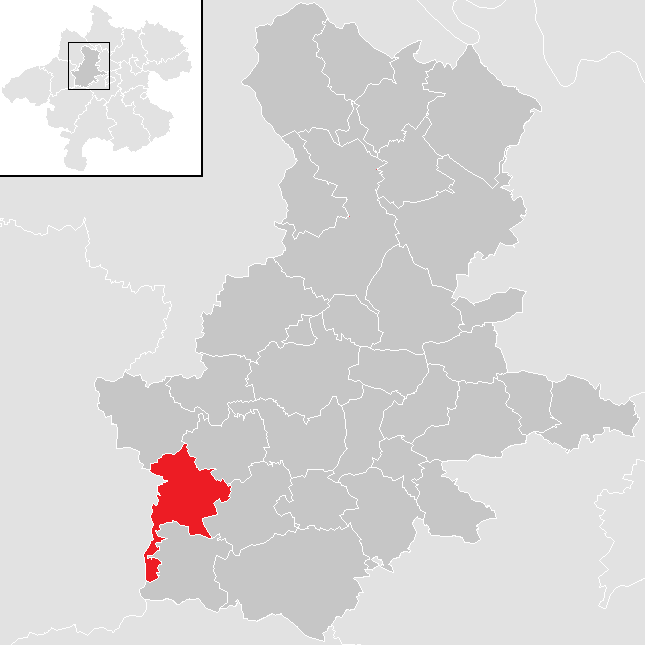
- Location in the district

- Location within Austria
- Coordinates: 48°11′08″N 13°38′32″E
- Country: Austria
- State: Upper Austria
- District: Grieskirchen

Government
  - Mayor: Konrad Binder (ÖVP)

Area
  - Total: 16.98 km^{2} (6.56 sq mi)
- Elevation: 505 m (1,657 ft)

Population (2018-01-01)
  - Total: 2,176
  - Density: 128.2/km^{2} (331.9/sq mi)
- Time zone: UTC+1 (CET)
  - Summer (DST): UTC+2 (CEST)
- Postal code: 4680
- Area code: 07732
- Vehicle registration: GR
- Website: www.haag-hausruck.at

Haag am Hausruck is a municipality in the district of Grieskirchen in the Austrian state of Upper Austria. It is home to many historic buildings as well as its own castle. Haag (for short) is located right next to a very large and scenic forest.

Starhemberg Castle (Haag am Hausruck) is a Renaissance-style fortress first mentioned in 1246 AD, situated west of the marketplace. The 16th-century complex, owned by DI Hatschek, served as a military hospital in the early 20th century and a transit camp for refugees in World War II. Today, it houses the Haager Heimatstuben with exhibits on agriculture, mining, crafts, trade, and castle graphics.

Luisenhöhe, the local mountain, features an Adventure Mountain Railway, a summer toboggan run (currently idle), and attractions like the "Path of the Senses" trail, an observation tower, a forest school, and a high ropes course. The annual events in Haag am Hausruck include the Kirtag, horse market, Country Festival, Castle Concert, and Beer Wagon Race. The Catholic Parish Church, altered in the 17th century, is dedicated to St. Vitus.

== Geography ==
Haag lies in the Hausruckviertel. About 88 percent of the municipality is farmland, and 2 percent is urban.
