= Sankt Georgen bei Grieskirchen =

- Municipality
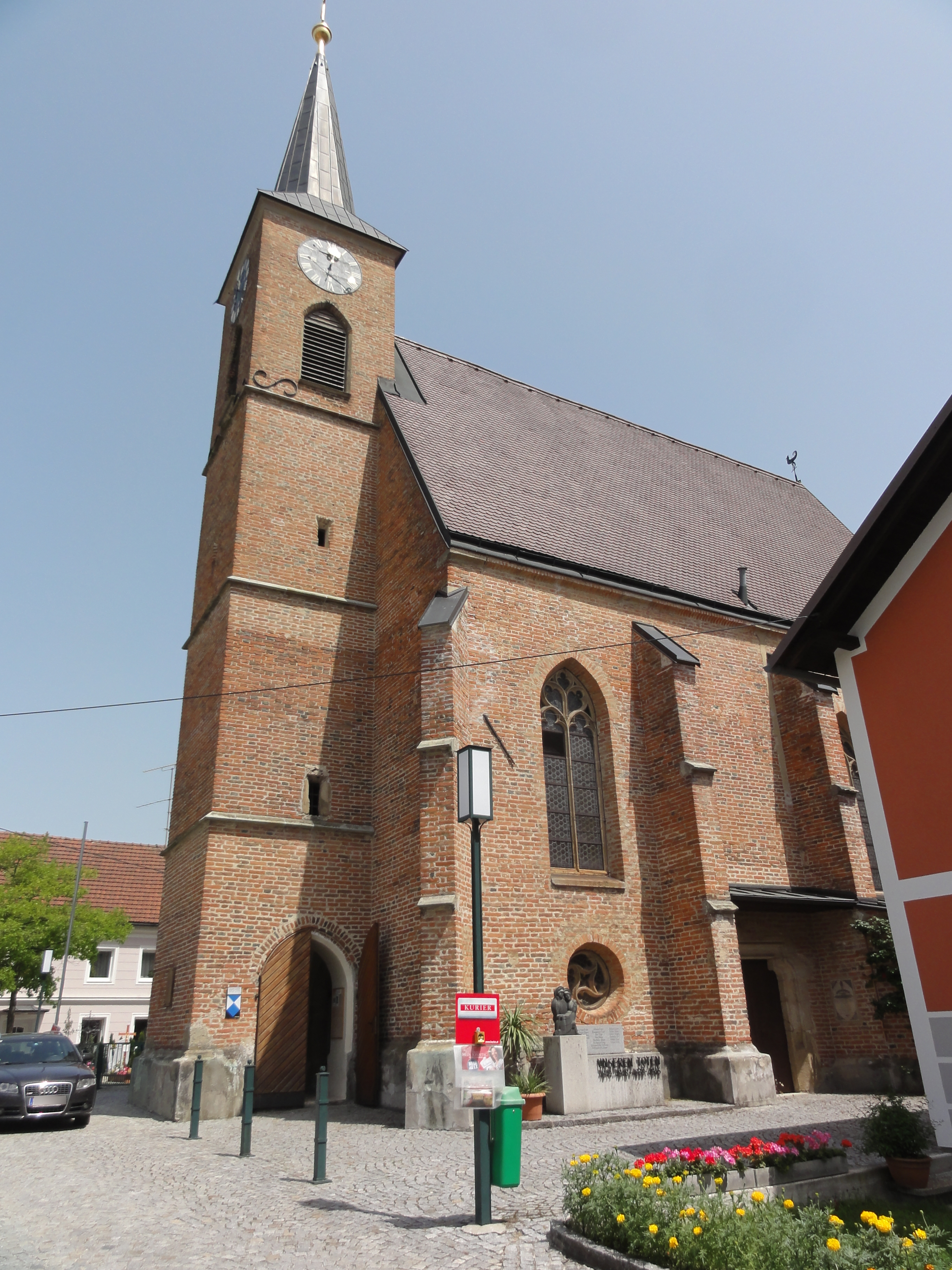

- Coat of arms

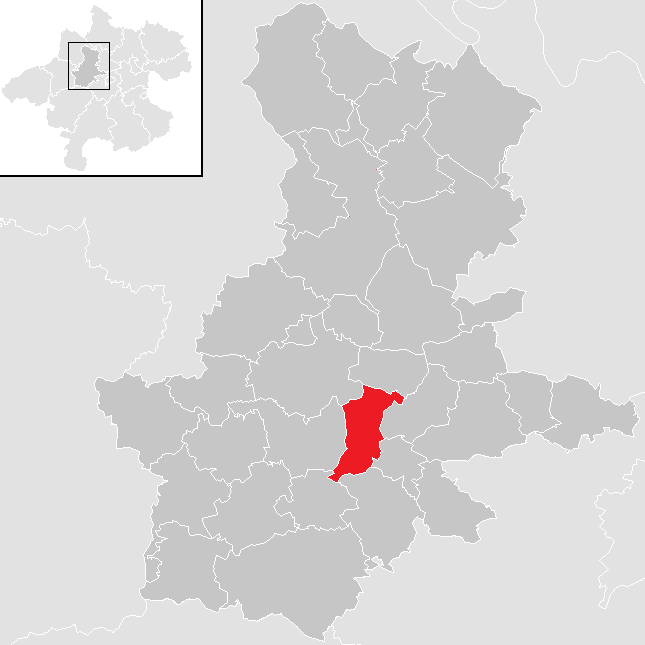
- Location in the district

- Location within Austria
- Coordinates: 48°12′45″N 13°46′47″E
- Country: Austria
- State: Upper Austria
- District: Grieskirchen

Government
  - Mayor: Karl Furthmair (ÖVP)

Area
  - Total: 11.41 km^{2} (4.41 sq mi)
- Elevation: 396 m (1,299 ft)

Population (2018-01-01)
  - Total: 1,336
  - Density: 117.1/km^{2} (303.3/sq mi)
- Time zone: UTC+1 (CET)
  - Summer (DST): UTC+2 (CEST)
- Postal code: 4710
- Area code: 07248
- Vehicle registration: GR
- Website: www.st.georgen.co.at

Sankt Georgen bei Grieskirchen is a municipality in the district of Grieskirchen in the Austrian state of Upper Austria.

== Geography ==
Sankt Georgen lies in the Hausruckviertel. About 14 percent of the municipality is forest, and 78 percent is farmland.

== History ==
The municipality bears the coat of arms of its former lords, the Jörger von Tollet family.
