= Michaelnbach =

- Municipality
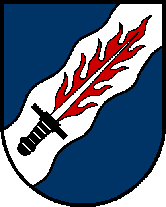
- Coat of arms

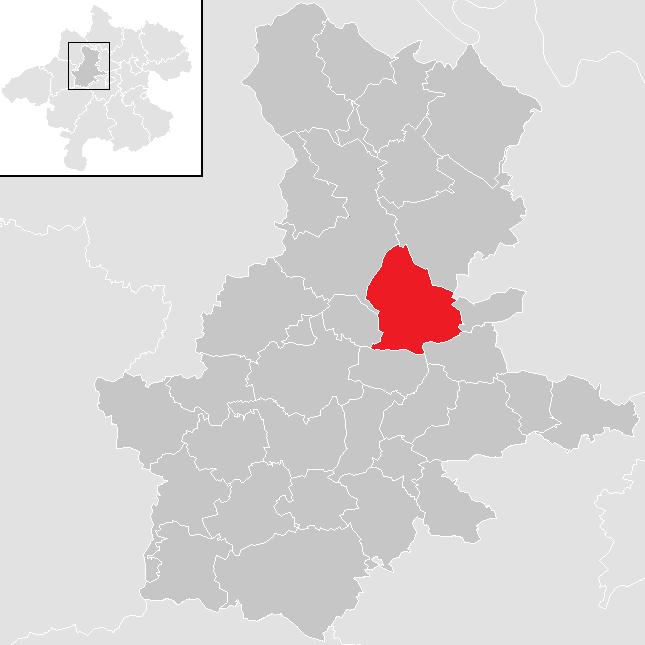
- Location in the district

- Location within Austria
- Coordinates: 48°17′19″N 13°49′57″E
- Country: Austria
- State: Upper Austria
- District: Grieskirchen

Government
  - Mayor: Martin Dammayr (ÖVP)

Area
  - Total: 23.02 km^{2} (8.89 sq mi)
- Elevation: 394 m (1,293 ft)

Population (2018-01-01)
  - Total: 1,263
  - Density: 54.87/km^{2} (142.1/sq mi)
- Time zone: UTC+1 (CET)
  - Summer (DST): UTC+2 (CEST)
- Postal code: 4712
- Area code: 07277
- Vehicle registration: GR
- Website: www.michaelnbach.at

Michaelnbach is a municipality in the district of Grieskirchen in the Austrian state of Upper Austria.

== Geography ==
Michaelnbach lies in the Hausruckviertel. About 10 percent of the municipality is forest, and 82 percent is farmland.
