= Johann Nepomuk Hauser =

Austrian priest and politician (1866–1927)

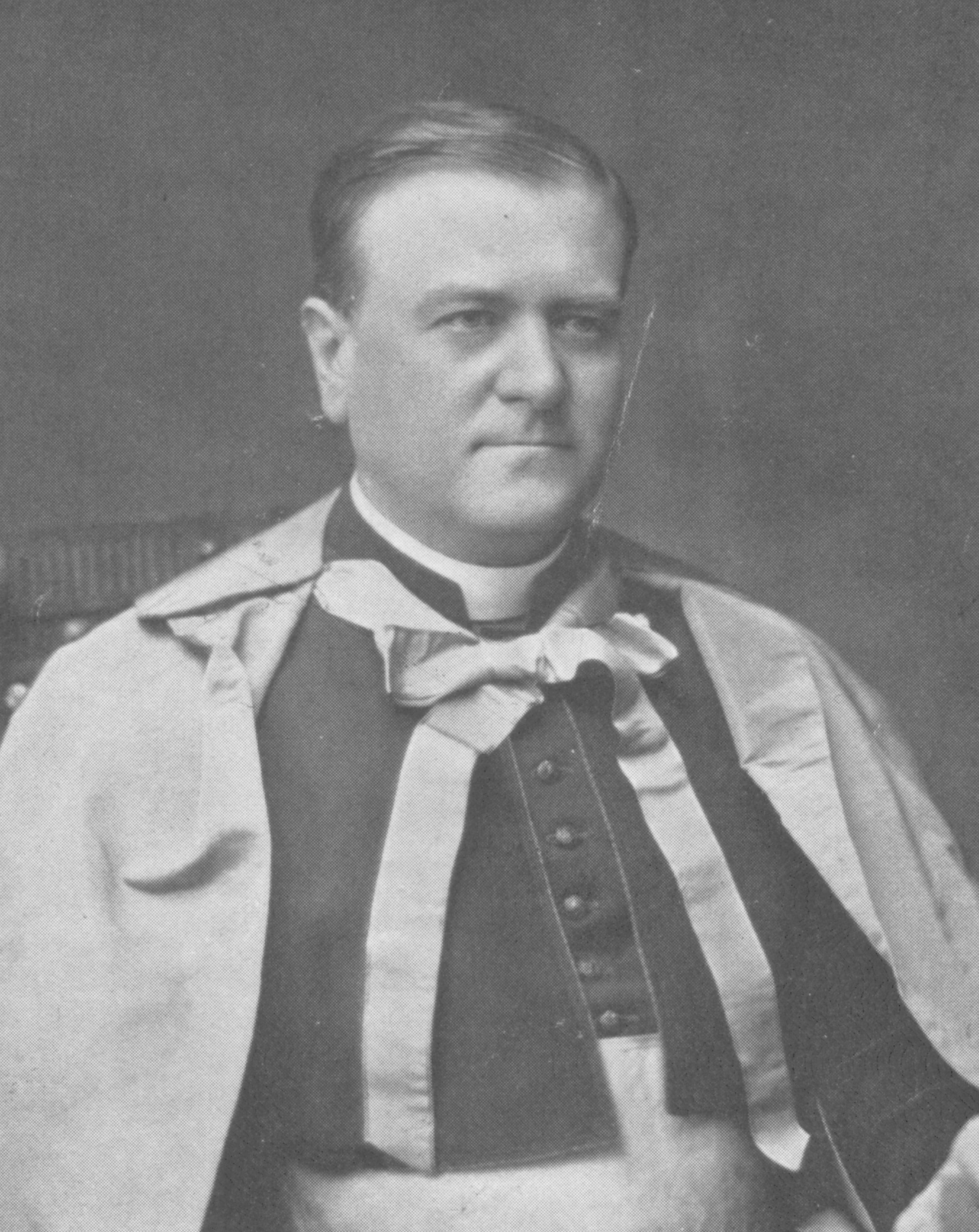
Portrait of Johann Nepomuk Hauser

Johann Nepomuk Hauser (March 24, 1866 in Kopfing im Innkreis – February 8, 1927 in Linz) was an Austrian Roman Catholic priest and politician. He was a member of the Christian Social Party.

== Biography ==
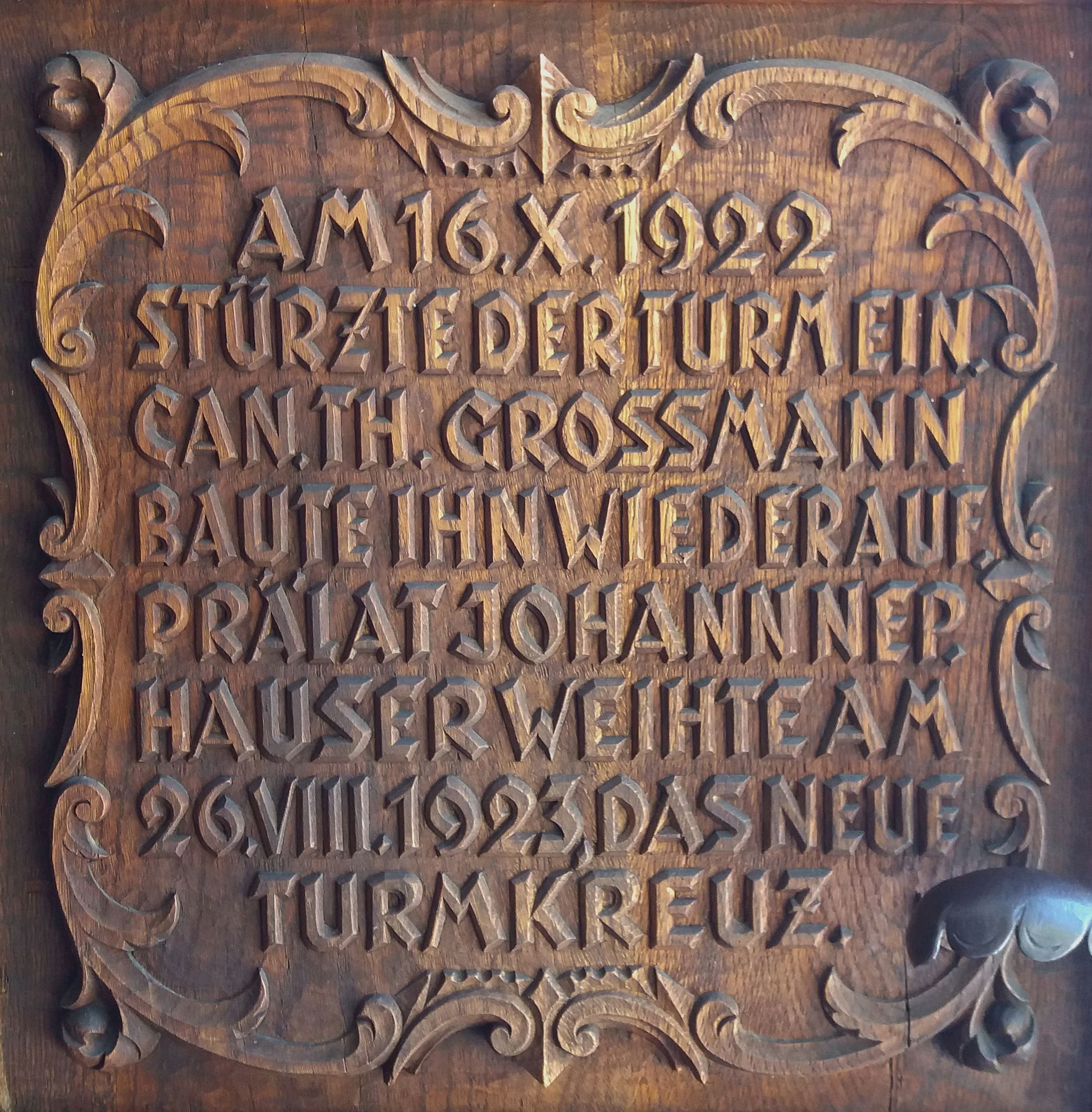
Inscription on the west portal of the church about the tower collapse in 1922 and the consecration of the new building by Hauser

Hauser attended elementary school in Natternbach on May 1, 1872, and the Jesuit gymnasium in Freinberg from 1877 to 1885. He studied at the seminary at Linz from 1885 to 1889. He served as chaplain in Gaflenz and the suburban parish of Wels on August 3, 1890, where he later became the prelate and consistorial councilor.

From 1891 to 1927, he was secretary of the Upper Austrian People's Credit, and on January 15, 1918, he became chancery director of the institute. From 1893 to 1895, he was an editor of the Christian Art Sheets and Catholic Workers. In early 1897, he was a committee member of the Catholic People's Association, who later served as the treasurer and from 1903, the secretary. From 1897 to 1913, he served as auditor for the Catholic Press Association, and from 1903, he was editor of the People's Association Messenger. From 1918 to 1920, he was chairman of the Christian Social Party.

Hauser served as a member of the Upper Austrian Provincial Parliament from 1899 to 1927, and in 1908, as a member of the Imperial Council. From 1908 to 1927, he also served as Governor of Upper Austria. After the collapse of the Austro-Hungarian Empire in 1918, he became one of three presidents of the Provisional National Assembly on October 30, 1918, following the resignation of Jodok Fink. On March 5, 1919, he became second president of the Constituent National Assembly. From 1920 to 1927, he was a member of the National Council.

Hauser is buried in the abbots' crypt of Wilhering Abbey. The Nepomuk-Hauser-Gasse in Andorf is named after him.

== Sources ==
- "Hauser Johann Nepomuk". In: Österreichisches Biographisches Lexikon 1815–1950 (ÖBL). Vol. 2, Austrian Academy of Sciences, Vienna 1959, p. 218 f. (Direct links to "p. 218", "p. 219")
- Josef Honeder (1969). "Hauser, Johann Nepomuk". Neue Deutsche Biographie (in German). Vol. 8. Berlin: Duncker & Humblot. pp. 118–118. (full text online).
- Ernst Bruckmüller (ed.): Lexicon of Austrian Personalities. Publishing Group Austria-Lexicon, Vienna 2001, ISBN 3-95004-387-X.
