= Hofkirchen an der Trattnach =

- Municipality
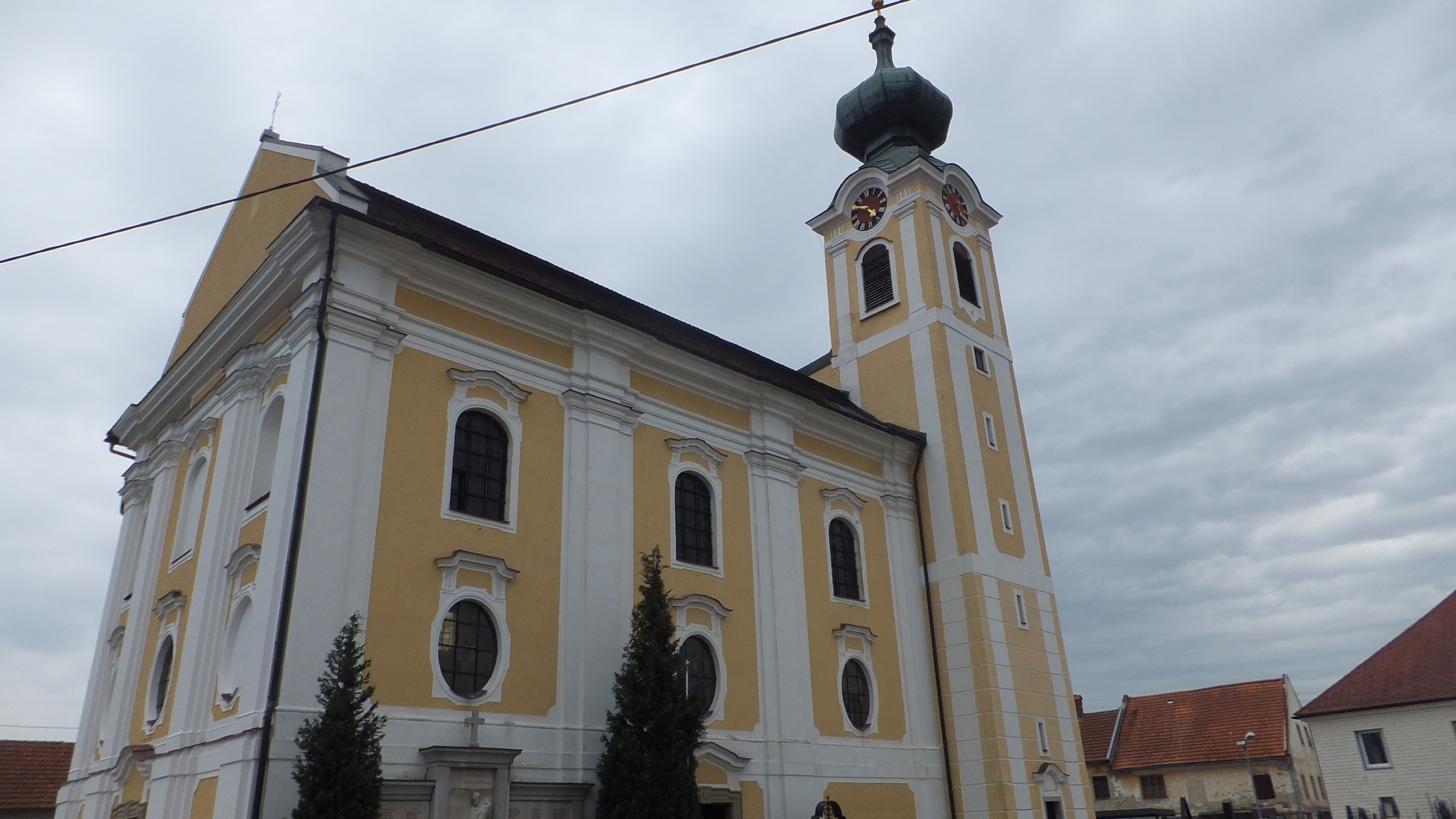

- Coat of arms

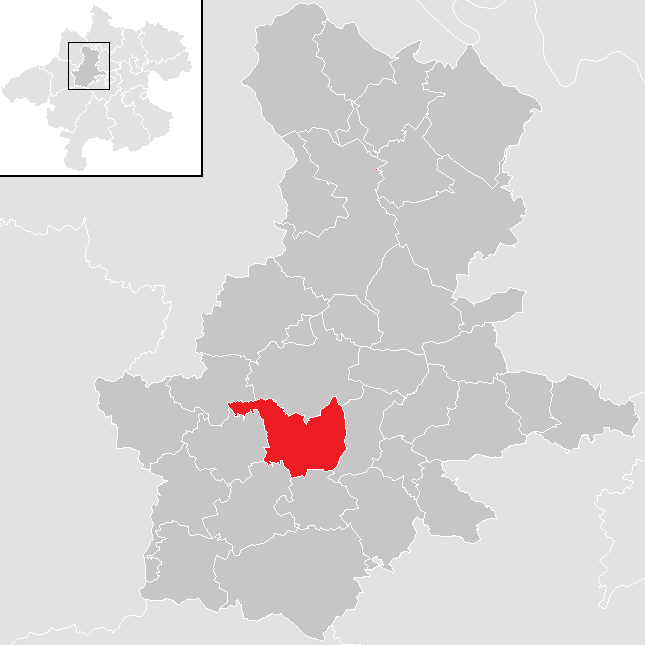
- Location in the district

- Location within Austria
- Coordinates: 48°13′11″N 13°44′24″E
- Country: Austria
- State: Upper Austria
- District: Grieskirchen

Government
  - Mayor: Alois Zauner (ÖVP)

Area
  - Total: 18 km^{2} (6.9 sq mi)
- Elevation: 389 m (1,276 ft)

Population (2018-01-01)
  - Total: 1,667
  - Density: 93/km^{2} (240/sq mi)
- Time zone: UTC+1 (CET)
  - Summer (DST): UTC+2 (CEST)
- Postal code: 4716
- Area code: 07734
- Vehicle registration: GR
- Website: www.hofkirchen-trattnach.at

Hofkirchen an der Trattnach is a municipality in the district of Grieskirchen in the Austrian state of Upper Austria.

== Geography ==
Hofkirchen lies in the Hausruckviertel. About 12 percent of the municipality is forest, and 79 percent is farmland.
