= Taufkirchen an der Trattnach =

- Municipality
- Coat of arms

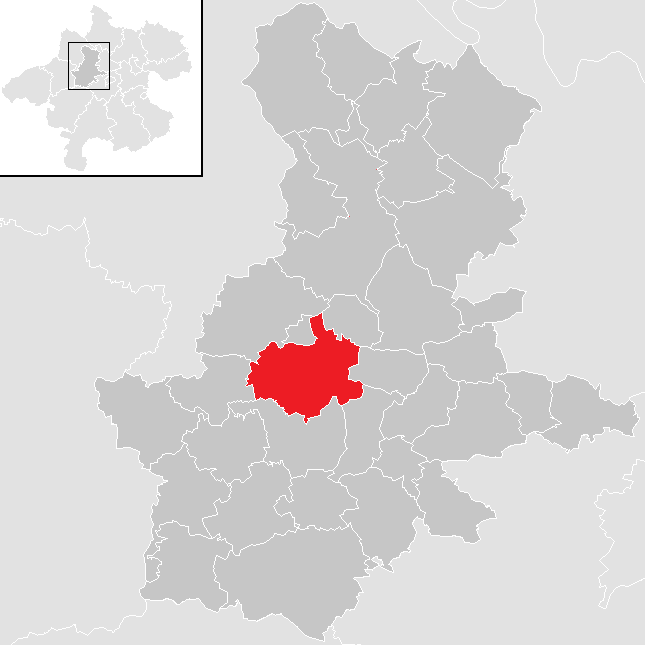
- Location in the district

- Location within Austria
- Coordinates: 48°14′51″N 13°45′0″E
- Country: Austria
- State: Upper Austria
- District: Grieskirchen

Government
  - Mayor: Gerhard Schaur (ÖVP)

Area
  - Total: 24.61 km^{2} (9.50 sq mi)
- Elevation: 377 m (1,237 ft)

Population (2018-01-01)
  - Total: 1,970
  - Density: 80.0/km^{2} (207/sq mi)
- Time zone: UTC+1 (CET)
  - Summer (DST): UTC+2 (CEST)
- Postal code: 4715
- Area code: 07734
- Vehicle registration: GR
- Website: www.taufkirchen.at

Taufkirchen an der Trattnach is a municipality in the district of Grieskirchen in the Austrian state of Upper Austria.

== Geography ==
Taufkirchen lies in the Hausruckviertel. About 14 percent of the municipality is forest, and 78 percent is farmland.
