= Neumarkt im Hausruckkreis =

- Municipality
- Coat of arms

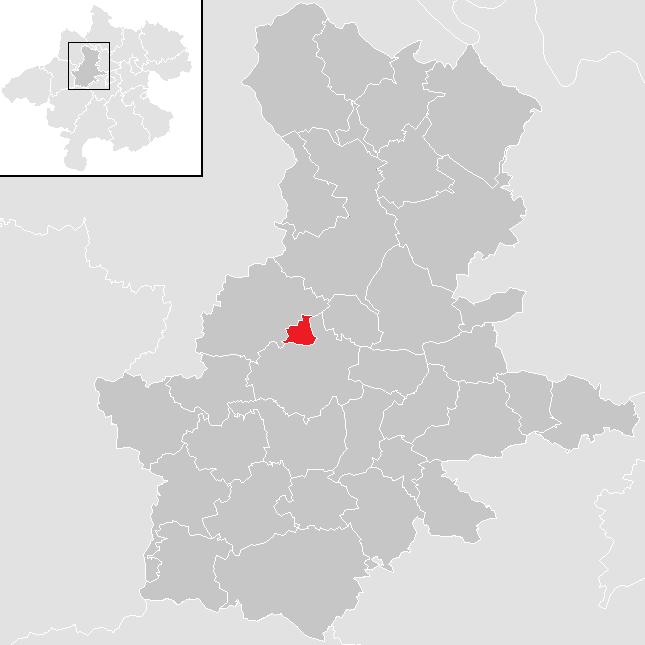
- Location in the district

- Location within Austria
- Coordinates: 48°16′27″N 13°43′35″E
- Country: Austria
- State: Upper Austria
- District: Grieskirchen

Government
  - Mayor: Bernhard Geyer (ÖVP)

Area
  - Total: 2.11 km^{2} (0.81 sq mi)
- Elevation: 388 m (1,273 ft)

Population (2018-01-01)
  - Total: 1,465
  - Density: 694/km^{2} (1,800/sq mi)
- Time zone: UTC+1 (CET)
  - Summer (DST): UTC+2 (CEST)
- Postal code: 4720
- Area code: 07733
- Vehicle registration: GR

Neumarkt im Hausruckkreis is a municipality in the district of Grieskirchen in the Austrian state of Upper Austria.

== Geography ==
Neumarkt lies in the Hausruckviertel. It is the municipality with the smallest area in Austria.
