= Geboltskirchen =

- Municipality
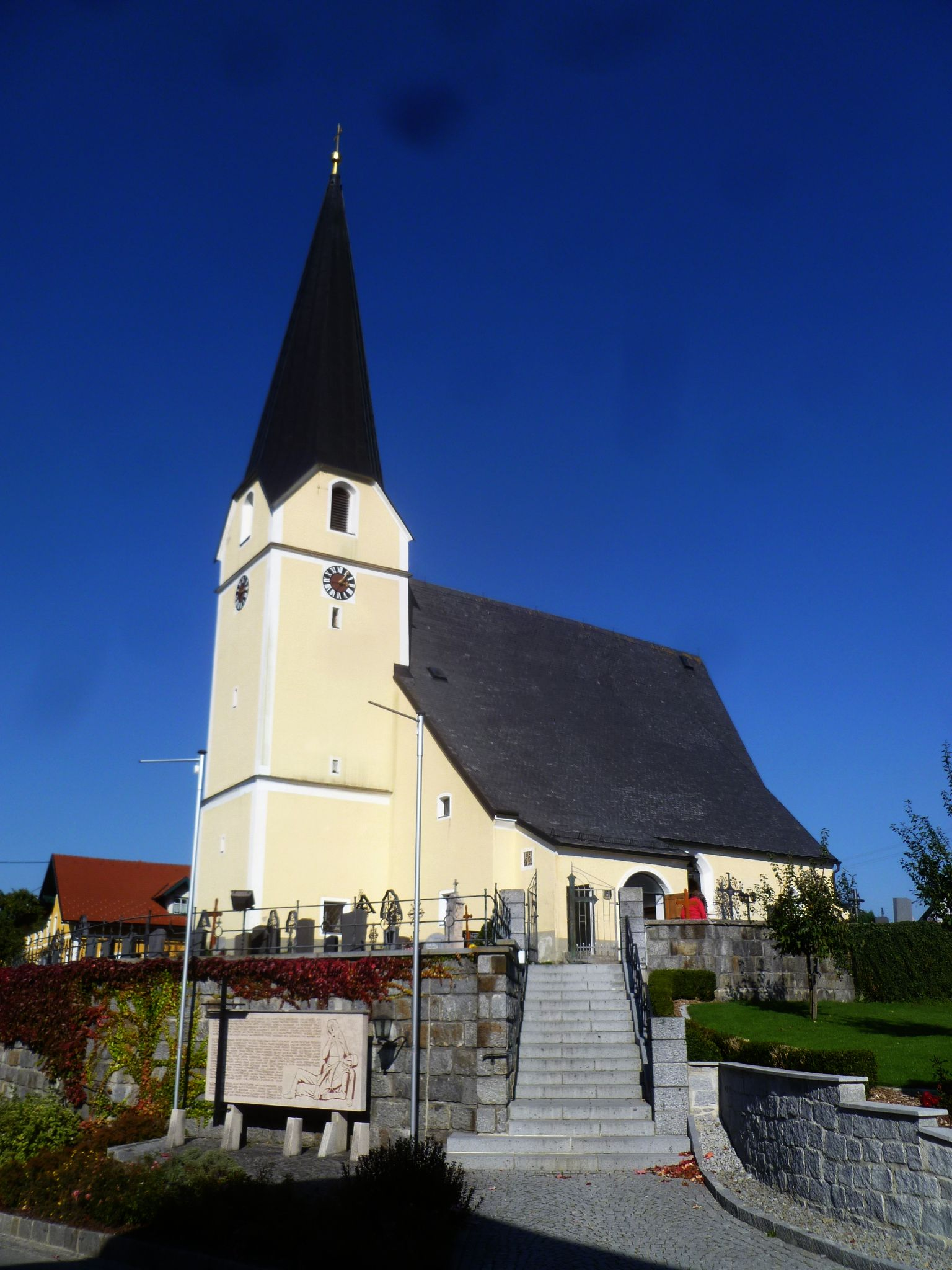

- Coat of arms

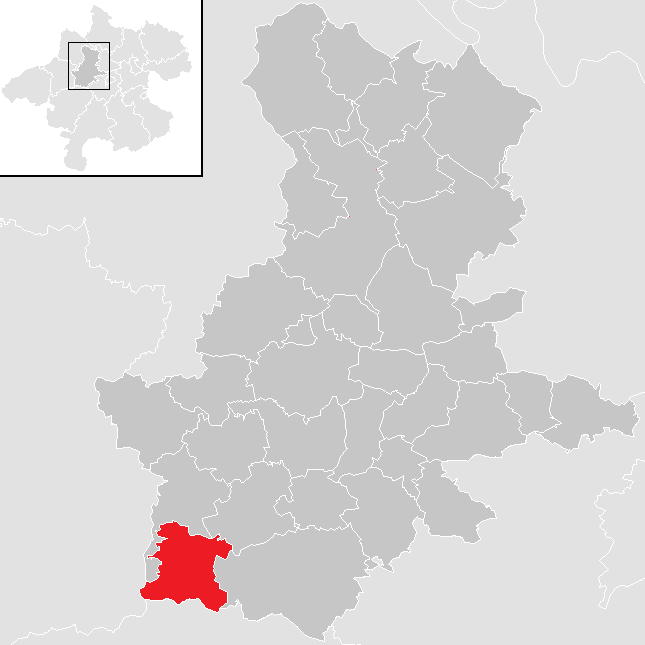
- Location in the district

- Location within Austria
- Coordinates: 48°09′14″N 13°38′05″E
- Country: Austria
- State: Upper Austria
- District: Grieskirchen

Government
  - Mayor: Friedrich Kirchsteiger (ÖVP)

Area
  - Total: 17.24 km^{2} (6.66 sq mi)
- Elevation: 555 m (1,821 ft)

Population (2018-01-01)
  - Total: 1,421
  - Density: 82.42/km^{2} (213.5/sq mi)
- Time zone: UTC+1 (CET)
  - Summer (DST): UTC+2 (CEST)
- Postal code: 4682
- Area code: 07732
- Vehicle registration: GR
- Website: www.geboltskirchen.at

Geboltskirchen is a municipality in the district of Grieskirchen in the Austrian state of Upper Austria.

== Population ==
Historical population
Year	Pop.	±%
1817	1,263	—
1823	1,219	−3.5%
1883	1,241	+1.8%
1900	1,533	+23.5%
1910	1,709	+11.5%
1917	1,742	+1.9%
1923	1,822	+4.6%
1934	1,742	−4.4%
1943	1,706	−2.1%
1955	1,425	−16.5%
1961	1,517	+6.5%
1971	1,370	−9.7%
1981	1,416	+3.4%
1991	1,422	+0.4%
2001	1,410	−0.8%
2009	1,436	+1.8%
2016	1,414	−1.5%
2018	1,421	+0.5%
