= Bad Schallerbach =

- Municipality
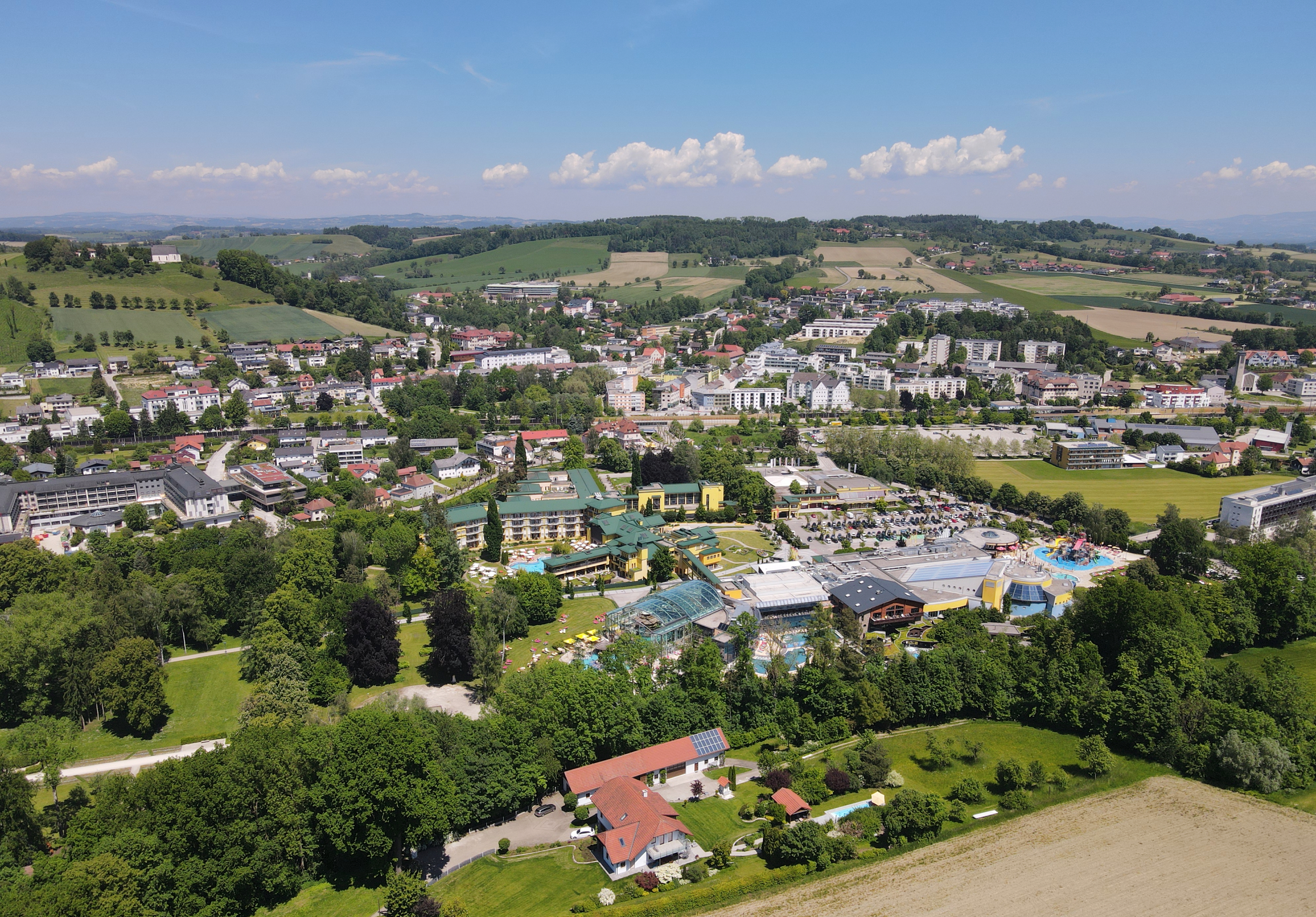
- Aerial view of Bad Schallerbach

- Coat of arms

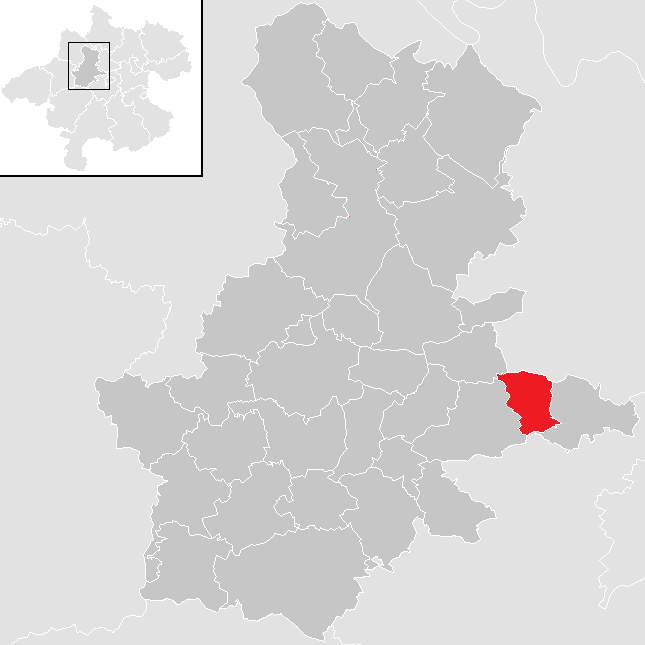
- Location in the district

- Location within Austria
- Coordinates: 48°13′0″N 13°55′0″E
- Country: Austria
- State: Upper Austria
- District: Grieskirchen

Government
  - Mayor: Gerhard Baumgartner (ÖVP)

Area
  - Total: 8.51 km^{2} (3.29 sq mi)
- Elevation: 308 m (1,010 ft)

Population (2018-01-01)
  - Total: 4,169
  - Density: 490/km^{2} (1,270/sq mi)
- Time zone: UTC+1 (CET)
  - Summer (DST): UTC+2 (CEST)
- Postal code: 4701
- Area code: 07249
- Vehicle registration: GR
- Website: www.bad-schallerbach.at

Bad Schallerbach is a municipality in the district of Grieskirchen in the Austrian state of Upper Austria.

== Geography ==
Bad Schallerbach is located in the Hausruckviertel. About 14 percent of the municipality is forest, and 67 percent is farmland.
