= Grieskirchen District =

Coordinates: 48.246°N 13.780°E

Grieskirchen District Bezirk Grieskirchen
- District
- Country: Austria
- State: Upper Austria
- Number of municipalities: 34
- Administrative seat: Grieskirchen

Government
  - District Governor: Christoph Schweitzer

Area
  - Total: 579.0 km^{2} (223.6 sq mi)

Population (2026)
  - Total: 66,739
  - Density: 115.3/km^{2} (298.5/sq mi)
- Time zone: UTC+01:00 (CET)
  - Summer (DST): UTC+02:00 (CEST)
- Vehicle registration: GR

Bezirk Grieskirchen is a district of the state of Upper Austria in Austria.

== Municipalities ==
Towns (Städte) are indicated in boldface; market towns (Marktgemeinden) in italics; suburbs, hamlets and other subdivisions of a municipality are indicated in small characters.

- Aistersheim (786)
- Bad Schallerbach (3287)
- Bruck-Waasen (2302)
- Eschenau im Hausruckkreis (1176)
- Gallspach (2575)
- Gaspoltshofen (3609)
- Geboltskirchen (1412)
- Grieskirchen (4807)
- Haag am Hausruck (2047)
- Heiligenberg (710)
- Hofkirchen an der Trattnach (1510)
- Kallham (2543)
- Kematen am Innbach (1262)
- Meggenhofen (1236)
- Michaelnbach (1232)
- Natternbach (2338)
- Neukirchen am Walde (1686)
- Neumarkt im Hausruckkreis (1447)
- Peuerbach (2234)
- Pollham (915)
- Pötting (541)
- Pram (1840)
- Rottenbach (1009)
- Schlüßlberg (2998)
- Sankt Agatha (2119)
- Sankt Georgen bei Grieskirchen (967)
- Sankt Thomas (460)
- Steegen (1124)
- Taufkirchen an der Trattnach (2093)
- Tollet (871)
- Waizenkirchen (3660)
- Wallern an der Trattnach (2874)
- Weibern (1587)
- Wendling (833)
