= Tollet =

- Municipality
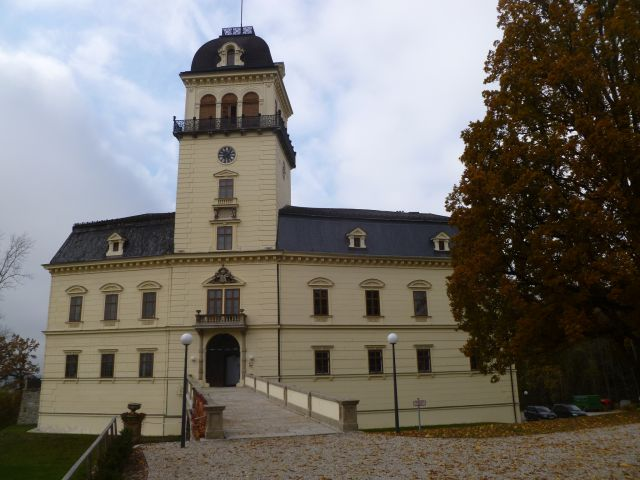
- Castle

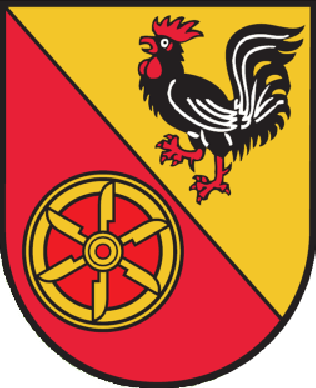
- Coat of arms

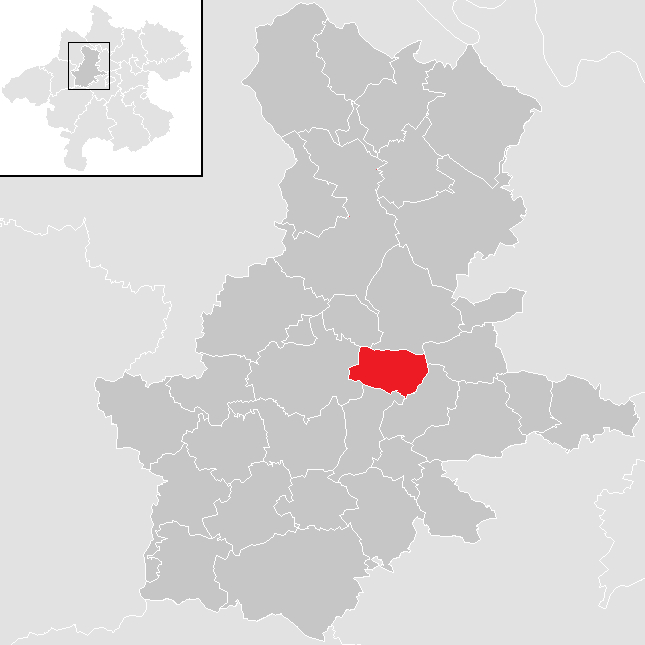
- Location in the district

- Location within Austria
- Coordinates: 48°14′44″N 13°48′02″E
- Country: Austria
- State: Upper Austria
- District: Grieskirchen

Government
  - Mayor: Dagmar Holter (ÖVP)

Area
  - Total: 9.55 km^{2} (3.69 sq mi)
- Elevation: 381 m (1,250 ft)

Population (2018-01-01)
  - Total: 920
  - Density: 96/km^{2} (250/sq mi)
- Time zone: UTC+1 (CET)
  - Summer (DST): UTC+2 (CEST)
- Postal code: 4710
- Area code: 07248
- Vehicle registration: GR
- Website: www.tollet.at

Tollet is a municipality in the district of Grieskirchen in the Austrian state of Upper Austria.

== Geography ==
Tollet lies in the Hausruckviertel. About 18 percent of the municipality is forest, and 72 percent is farmland.

== History ==
The noble family Jörger von Tollet is named after the village.
