= Pollham =

- Municipality
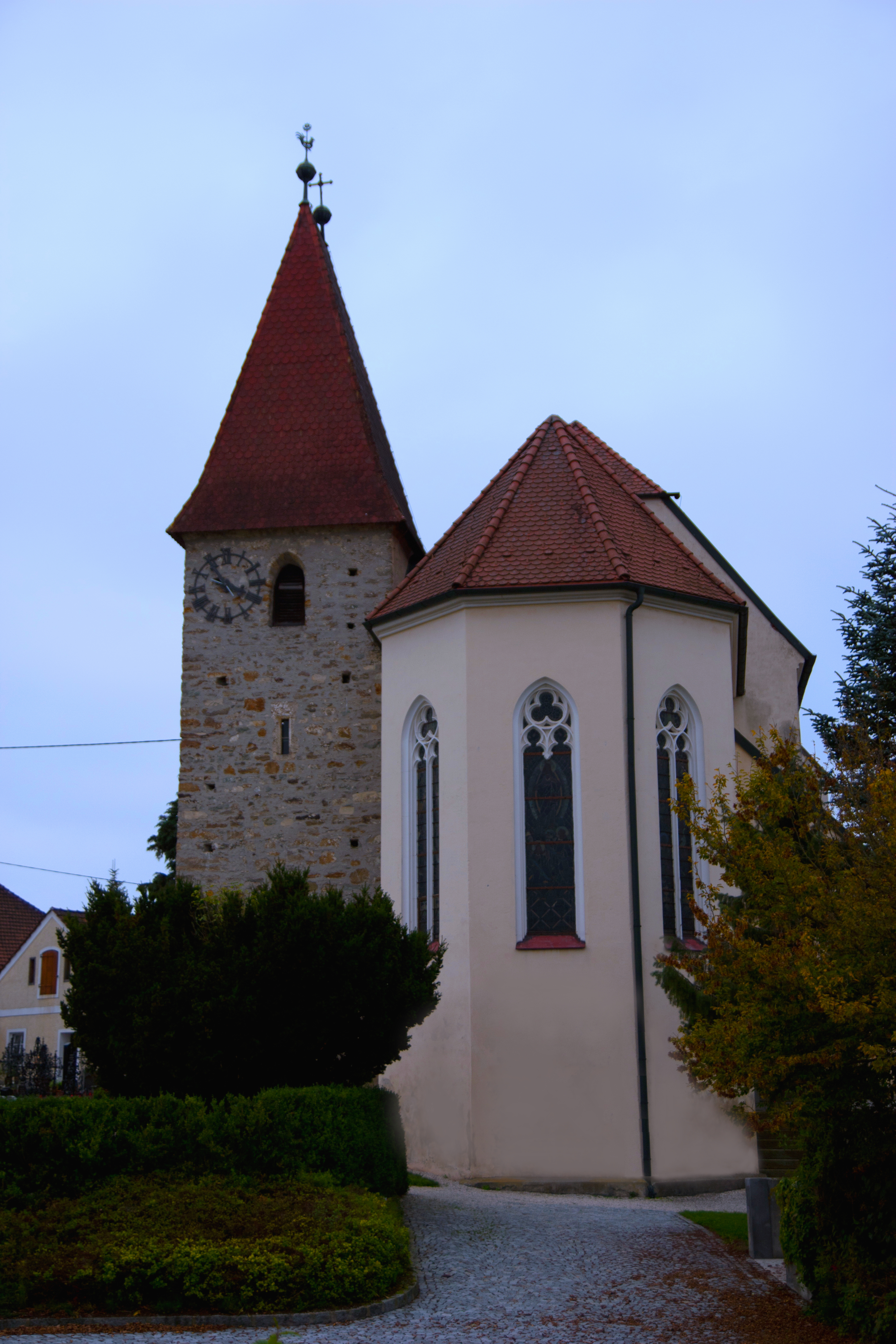

- Coat of arms

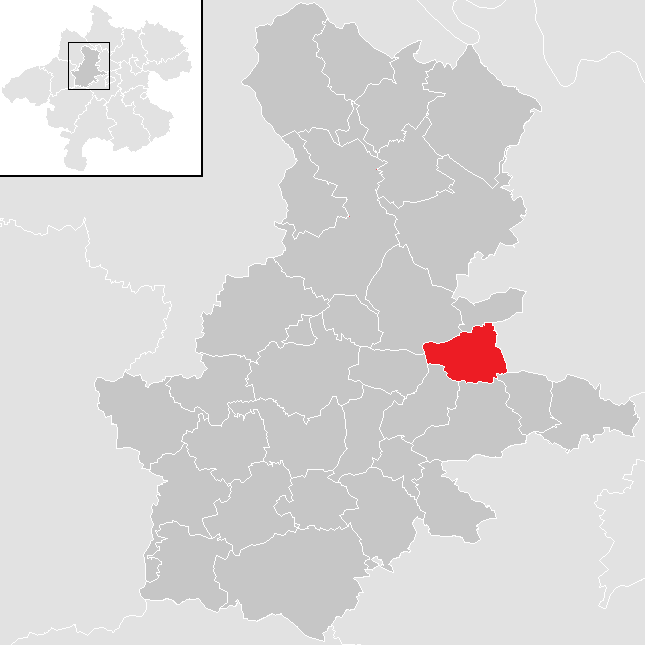
- Location in the district

- Location within Austria
- Coordinates: 48°15′38″N 13°51′06″E
- Country: Austria
- State: Upper Austria
- District: Grieskirchen

Government
  - Mayor: Johann Giglleitner (ÖVP)

Area
  - Total: 11.28 km^{2} (4.36 sq mi)
- Elevation: 380 m (1,250 ft)

Population (2018-01-01)
  - Total: 984
  - Density: 87.2/km^{2} (226/sq mi)
- Time zone: UTC+1 (CET)
  - Summer (DST): UTC+2 (CEST)
- Postal code: 4710
- Area code: 07248
- Vehicle registration: GR
- Website: www.pollham.at

Pollham is a municipality in the district of Grieskirchen in the Austrian state of Upper Austria.

== Geography ==
Pollham lies on the upper Polsenz. About 16 percent of the municipality is forest, and 71 percent is farmland.
