= Natternbach =

- Municipality
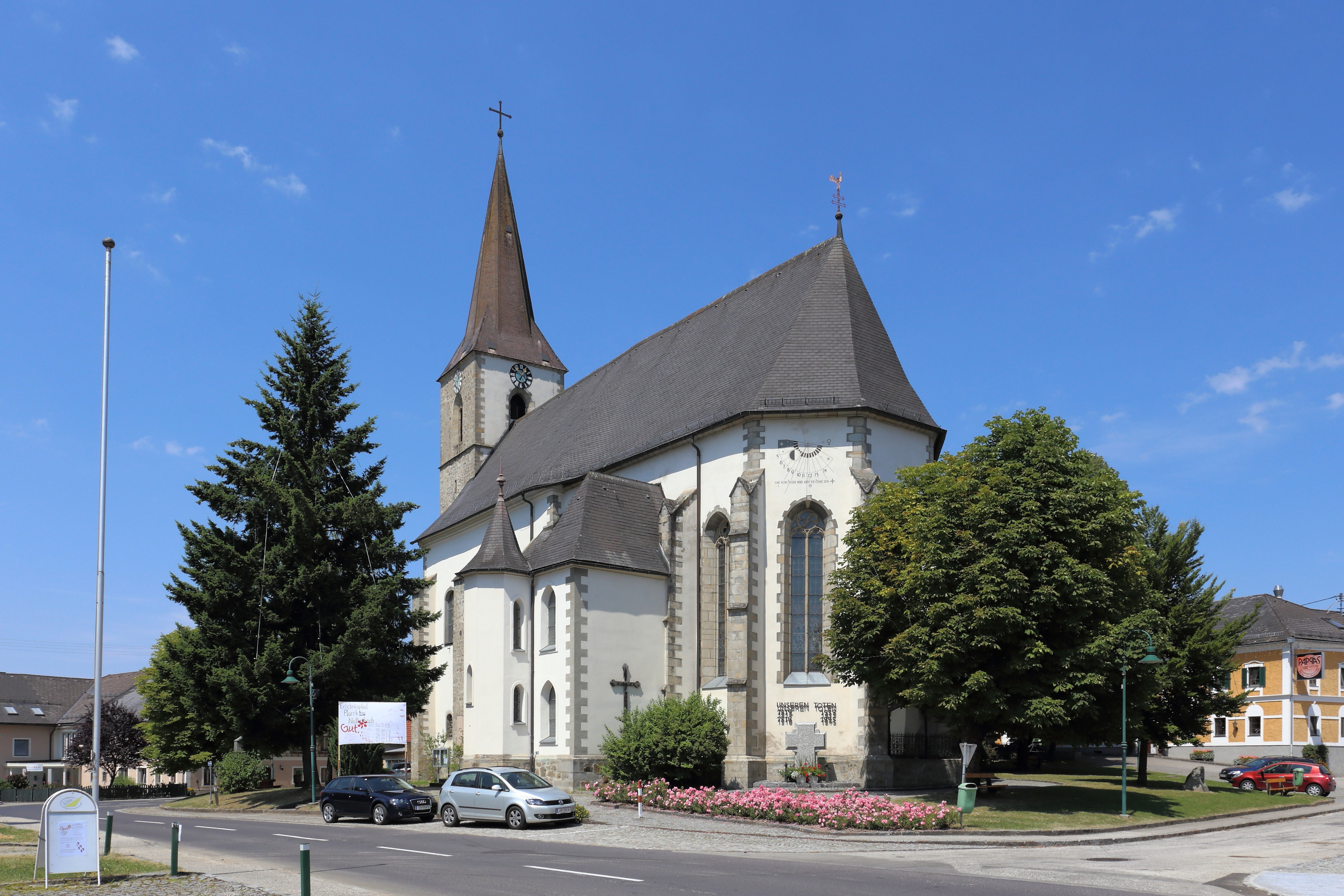

- Coat of arms

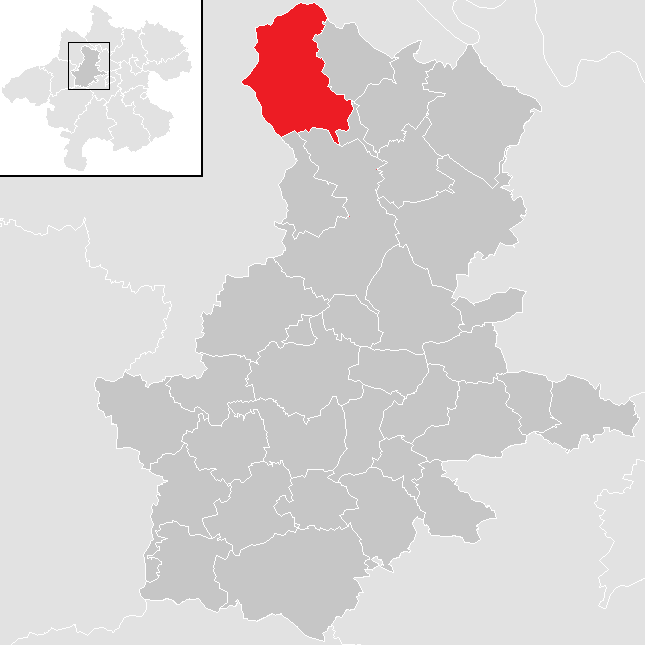
- Location in the district

- Location within Austria
- Coordinates: 48°23′51″N 13°45′00″E
- Country: Austria
- State: Upper Austria
- District: Grieskirchen

Government
  - Mayor: Josef Ruschak (ÖVP)

Area
  - Total: 30.96 km^{2} (11.95 sq mi)
- Elevation: 434 m (1,424 ft)

Population (2018-01-01)
  - Total: 2,305
  - Density: 74.45/km^{2} (192.8/sq mi)
- Time zone: UTC+1 (CET)
  - Summer (DST): UTC+2 (CEST)
- Postal code: 4723
- Area code: 07278
- Vehicle registration: GR
- Website: www.natternbach.at

Natternbach is a municipality in the district of Grieskirchen in the Austrian state of Upper Austria.

== Geography ==
Natternbach lies in the Hausruckviertel. About 36 percent of the municipality is forest, and 58 percent is farmland.
