= Kematen am Innbach =

- Municipality
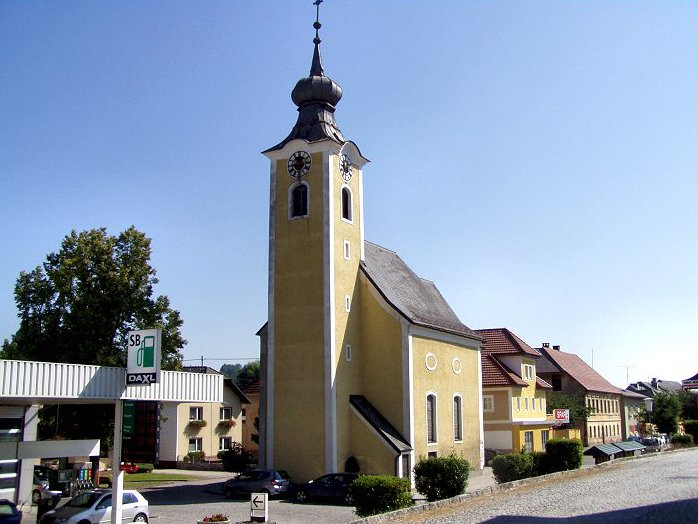

- Coat of arms

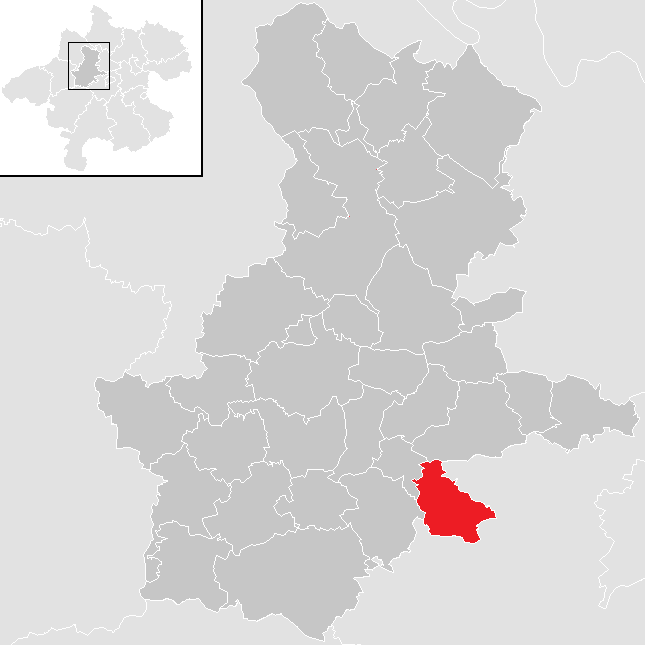
- Location in the district

- Location within Austria
- Coordinates: 48°10′39″N 13°51′45″E
- Country: Austria
- State: Upper Austria
- District: Grieskirchen

Government
  - Mayor: Klaus Bachmair (SPÖ)

Area
  - Total: 12.67 km^{2} (4.89 sq mi)
- Elevation: 350 m (1,150 ft)

Population (2018-01-01)
  - Total: 1,413
  - Density: 111.5/km^{2} (288.8/sq mi)
- Time zone: UTC+1 (CET)
  - Summer (DST): UTC+2 (CEST)
- Postal code: 4633
- Area code: 07247
- Vehicle registration: GR

Kematen am Innbach is a municipality in the district of Grieskirchen in the Austrian state of Upper Austria.

== Geography ==
Kematen lies in the Hausruckviertel. About 16 percent of the municipality is forest, and 73 percent is farmland.
