= Salzkammergut railway line =

Railway line in Austria

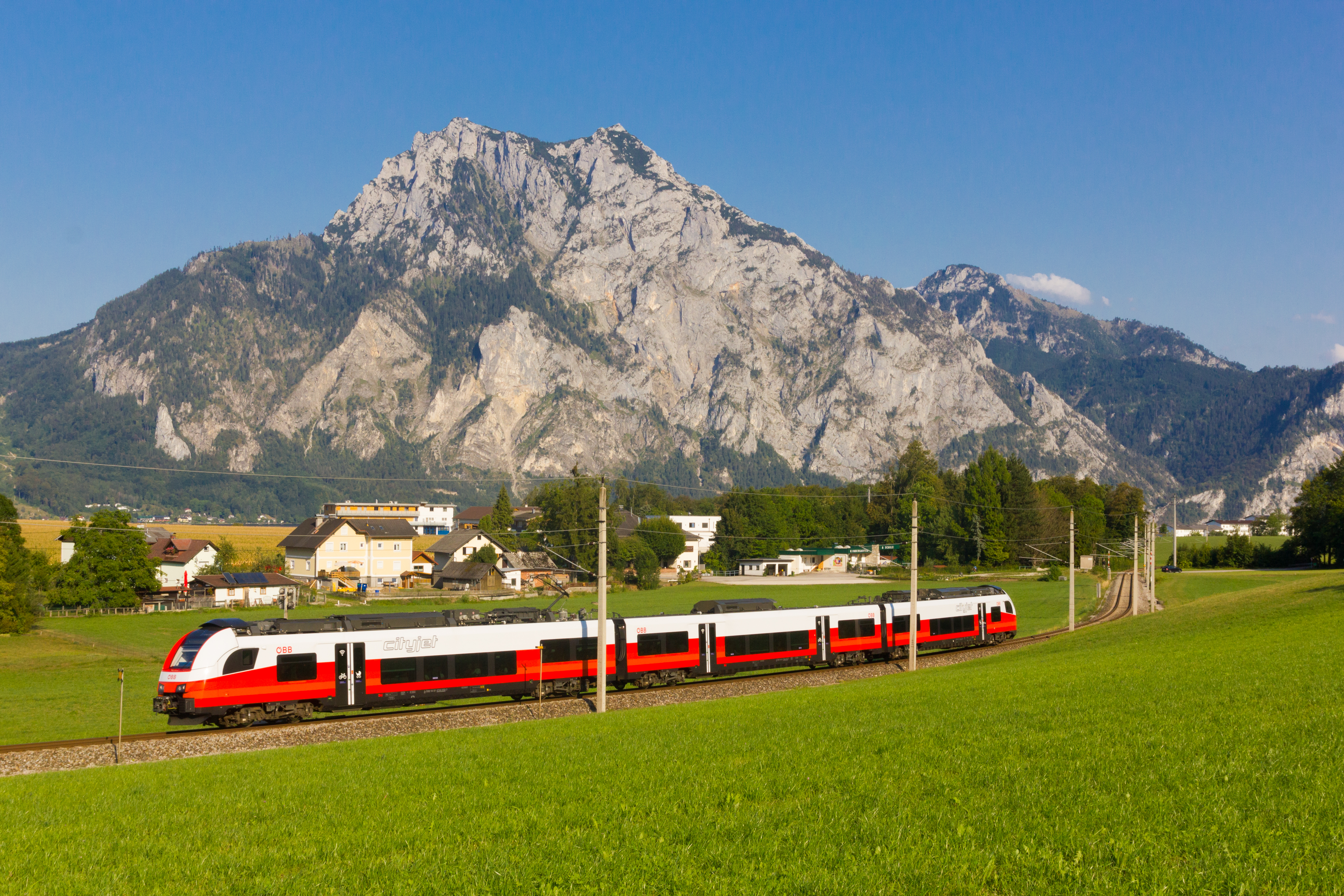
- A regional train near Altmünster in 2018

Overview
- Locale: Austria
- Termini: Gopperding; Stainach-Irdning

Technical
- Line length: 171.1 km (106.3 mi)
- Number of tracks: 1
- Track gauge: 1,435 mm (4 ft 8 1/2 in) standard gauge
- Electrification: 15 kV 16.7 Hz AC (Attnang-Puchheim–Stainach-Irdning)

The Salzkammergut railway line (German: Salzkammergutbahn) is a standard gauge railway line in the Austrian states of Styria and Upper Austria. It runs 171.1 kilometres (106.3 mi) from a junction with the Wels–Passau railway line near Schärding to a junction with the Enns Valley Railway in Stainach. Austrian Federal Railways (ÖBB) owns and operates the line. The name refers to the Salzkammergut region through which the line runs.

== Route ==
The northern end of the line is at Gopperding, where it meets the Wels–Passau railway line. The portion of the line north of Attnang-Puchheim is single-tracked and unelectrified. The line runs north–south to Attnang-Puchheim. At Ried im Innkreis, there is a junction with the Innkreis railway line. In Attnang-Puchheim, there is a junction with the Western Railway. South of Attnang-Puchheim, the line continues to be single-tracked but is electrified at 15 kV 16.7 Hz AC. South of Gmunden, the line passes along the west coast of the Traunsee, and then follows the Traun river some 40 kilometres (25 mi) to the Hallstätter See. At the southern end of the Hallstätter See, near Obertraun-Dachsteinhöhlen, the line turns east, eventually meeting the Enns Valley Railway at Stainach-Irdning.

== Operations ==
Operationally, the line is split at Attnang-Puchheim; no service operates the full length. North of Attnang-Puchheim, regional trains operate on an hourly schedule, with some exceptions, to Schärding. South of Attnang-Puchheim, regional and Regional-Express combine for hourly service to Bad Ischl or Obertraun-Dachsteinhöhlen, with some trains continuing to Stainach-Irdning. A single InterCity train, the Salzkammergut, operates daily between Wien Hauptbahnhof and Stainach-Irdning.
