= Pötting =

- Municipality
- Coat of arms

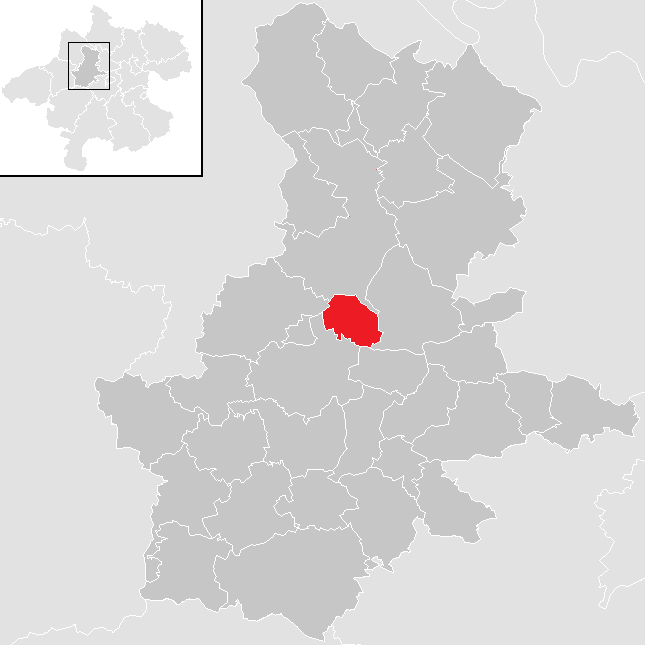
- Location in the district

- Location within Austria
- Coordinates: 48°17′0″N 13°46′27″E
- Country: Austria
- State: Upper Austria
- District: Grieskirchen

Government
  - Mayor: Peter Oberlehner (ÖVP)

Area
  - Total: 7.43 km^{2} (2.87 sq mi)
- Elevation: 381 m (1,250 ft)

Population (2018-01-01)
  - Total: 541
  - Density: 72.8/km^{2} (189/sq mi)
- Time zone: UTC+1 (CET)
  - Summer (DST): UTC+2 (CEST)
- Postal code: 4720
- Area code: 07733
- Vehicle registration: GR
- Website: www.poetting.ooe.gv.at

Pötting is a municipality in the district of Grieskirchen in the Austrian state of Upper Austria.

== Geography ==
Pötting lies in the Hausruckviertel. About 5 percent of the municipality is forest, and 84 percent is farmland.
