= Hausruckviertel =

Region in Upper Austria

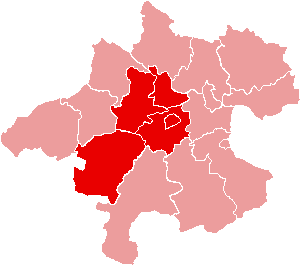

The Hausruckviertel is one of the four traditional "quarters" (German: Viertel) of the Austrian province of Upper Austria. The region is named after a range of hills, the Hausruck.

Cities in the Hausruckviertel include Wels, Eferding, Grieskirchen, and Vöcklabruck.
