= List of town tramway systems in Austria =

This is a list of town tramway systems in Austria. It includes all tram systems in Austria, past and present; cities with currently operating systems, and those systems themselves, are indicated in bold and blue background colored rows. The use of the diamond (♦) symbol indicates where there were (or are) two or more independent tram systems operating concurrently within a single metropolitan area. Those tram systems that operated on other than standard gauge track (where known) are indicated in the 'Notes' column.

Location	Relevant Wikipedia Article	Traction Type	Date (From)	Date (To)	Notes
Dornbirn - Lustenau		Electric	30 Nov 1902	31 Oct 1938	Gauge: 1,000 mm (3 ft 3 3/8 in)
Gmunden	Trams in Gmunden	Electric	13 Aug 1894		Gauge: 1,000 mm (3 ft 3 3/8 in); Ranked as the world's smallest operating town tramway (by system length). In 2018 it has been converted into a tram-train system, called Traunsee Tram by linking it to the Traunseebahn.
Graz	Trams in Graz	Horse	18 Jun 1878	23 Jul 1899	
Graz	Trams in Graz	Electric	29 Jan 1898		
Innsbruck	Trams in Innsbruck	Steam	1 Jun 1891	1 Jan 1910	Gauge: 1,000 mm (3 ft 3 3/8 in)
Innsbruck	Trams in Innsbruck	Electric	15 Jul 1905		Gauge: 1,000 mm (3 ft 3 3/8 in)
Klagenfurt	Trams in Klagenfurt	Horse	30 Jun 1891	1911	Gauge: 1,000 mm (3 ft 3 3/8 in)
Klagenfurt	Trams in Klagenfurt	Electric	6 May 1911	16 Apr 1963	Gauge: 1,000 mm (3 ft 3 3/8 in)
**↘ Linz**
♦ Linz	Trams in Linz	Horse	18 Jul 1880	31 Jul 1897	Gauge: 900 mm (2 ft 11 7/16 in)
♦ Linz	Trams in Linz	Electric	31 Jul 1897		Gauge: 900 mm (2 ft 11 7/16 in)
♦ Linz - Pöstlingberg	Pöstlingbergbahn	Electric	29 May 1898		Gauge: 1,000 mm (3 ft 3 3/8 in); 2008-2009 service suspended; the line, regauged and integrated in Linz's urban network, was reopened on 29 May 2009.
♦ Ebelsberg - Sankt Florian	Florianerbahn	Electric	1 Sep 1913	31 Dec 1973	Gauge: 900 mm (2 ft 11 7/16 in); Reopened as a museum tramway.
Salzburg		Electric	4 May 1909	15 Nov 1940	Replaced by the city trolleybus system.
Sankt Pölten		Electric	18 Mar 1911	10 Feb 1976	
Unterach		Electric	18 Aug 1907	18 Sep 1949	Gauge: 1,000 mm (3 ft 3 3/8 in); Located at the south end of Attersee lake.
**↘ Vienna**
♦ Vienna	Trams in Vienna	Horse	4 Oct 1865	28 Jun 1903	
♦ Vienna	Trams in Vienna	Steam	27 Oct 1883	23 Jan 1922	
♦ Vienna	Trams in Vienna	Electric	28 Jan 1897		
♦ Vienna - Baden	Wiener Lokalbahn	Steam	29 Sep 1886	1907	
♦ Vienna - Baden	Wiener Lokalbahn	Electric	11 May 1899		Tram-train system, electric service from Vienna - Baden began on 1 May 1907.
♦ Baden (bei Wien)		Horse	16 Jul 1876	Oct 1893	
♦ Baden (bei Wien)		Electric	16 Jul 1894	14 Feb 1951	
♦ Mödling – Hinterbrühl	Mödling and Hinterbrühl Tram	Electric	17 Oct 1883	31 Mar 1932	First permanent electric tramway in Europe.
Ybbs an der Donau		electric	11 Nov 1907	22 Sep 1953	Gauge: 760 mm (2 ft 5 15/16 in)

== See also ==
- List of town tramway systems – parent article
- List of town tramway systems in Europe
- List of tram and light rail transit systems
- List of metro systems
