= Lingens =

Lingens is a surname. Notable people with the surname include:

- Kurt Lingens (born 1912), German psychiatrist
- Ella Lingens (18 November, 1908 – 30 December, 2002), German physician and one of the Six Righteous Among the Nations of Auschwitz
- Rudolf Lingens, is a fictional character often used by contemporary analytic philosophers as a placeholder name in a hypothetical scenario

== See also ==
- Campiglossa lingens, is a species of tephritid or fruit flies in the genus Campiglossa of the family Tephritidae
- Lingens v. Austria, was a 1986 European Court of Human Rights
- Panogena lingens, is a moth of the family Sphingidae
