= Narrow-gauge railways in Austria =

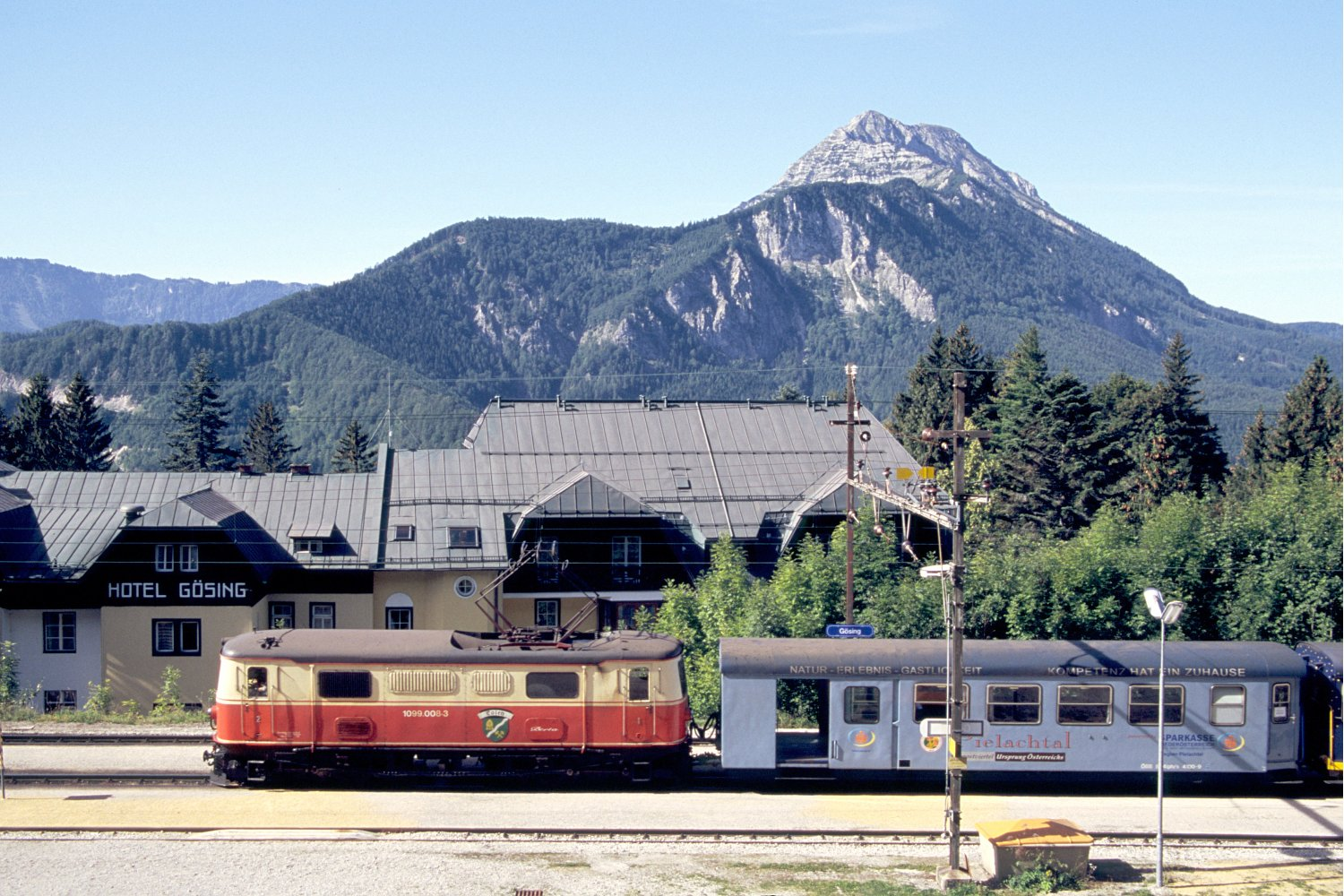
Train of the Mariazellerbahn in Lower Austria

The first railway in Austria was the narrow-gauge line from Gmunden in the Salzkammergut to Budweis, now in the Czech Republic, this was 1,106 mm (3 ft 7 1/2 in) gauge. Some two dozen lines were built in 760 mm (2 ft 5 15/16 in) gauge, a few in 1,000 mm (3 ft 3 3/8 in) metre gauge gauge. The first was the Steyrtalbahn. Others were built by provincial governments, some lines are still in common carrier use and a number of others are preservation projects. The tramway network in Innsbruck is also metre gauge; in Linz the rather unusual gauge of 900 mm (2 ft 11 7/16 in) is in use.

384 km (239 mi) 1,000 mm (3 ft 3 3/8 in) metre gauge gauge; 88 km (55 mi) 760 mm (2 ft 5 15/16 in) gauge (2008)

== Metre-gauge railways ==
- Achenseebahn, 6.78 km (4.21 mi), steam engine.
- Lokalbahn Vöcklamarkt–Attersee, 15.3 km (9.5 mi) and electrified.
- Schafbergbahn, a cog railway, 5.85 km (3.64 mi), steam engine.
- Schneebergbahn, a cog railway, 9.85 km (6.12 mi)
- Stubaitalbahn, 18.2 km (11.3 mi), now trams in Innsbruck Linie STB, Fulpmes-Innsbruck Hbf, electrified
- Innsbrucker Mittelgebirgsbahn, 8.4 km (5.2 mi) and electrified. Now became trams in Innsbruck Linie 6, electrified.
- Traunseebahn 14.9 km (9.3 mi), connects to the Gmunden tramway, electrified.
- Lokalbahn Mödling–Hinterbrühl, 4.5 km (2.8 mi), closed in 1932. It was the first electrified railway in Austria.
- Straßenbahn Unterach–See am Mondsee, 3.26 km (2.03 mi), closed in 1949.
- Lokalbahn Innsbruck–Hall in Tirol, 11.8 km (7.3 mi), closed in 1974.

== 900mm gauge railways ==
- The Florianerbahn is a museum tramway in Upper Austria.
- The Trams in Linz are electrified, operating at 600 V C, opened in 1913 and extended in 2009 when the Pöstlingbergbahn was integrated with the tramway after gauge conversion from metre gauge.

== 760mm gauge railways ==
- Bregenzerwaldbahn 35.3 km (21.9 mi), steam engine
- Feistritztalbahn in Steiermark, 42.2 km (26.2 mi), steam engine
- Höllentalbahn, 5 km (3.1 mi)
- Lokalbahn Ober-Grafendorf–Gresten in Lower Austria, 62.3 km (38.7 mi), a branch of Mariazellerbahn.
- Lokalbahn Mixnitz–Sankt Erhard in Steiermark, 10.7 km (6.6 mi), electrified.
- Mariazellerbahn, from Sankt Pölten to Mariazell, 85 km (53 mi) electrified.
- Murtalbahn, 76.1 km (47.3 mi), steam engine
- Pinzgauer Lokalbahn, from Zell am See to Krimml, 52.6 km (32.7 mi)
- Stainzerbahn in Steiermark, 11.3 km (7.0 mi), steam engine.
- Steyrtalbahn, from Garsten to Klaus, 19.2 km (11.9 mi), steam engine
- Taurachbahn, a museum railway.
- Thörlerbahn, from Kapfenberg to Au-Seewiesen in Styria, 22.7 km (14.1 mi), diesel engine, closed in 1999.
- Vellachtalbahn in Kärnten, 17.5 km (10.9 mi)
- Waldviertler Schmalspurbahnen in Lower Austria, 82 km (51 mi), steam engine.
- Ybbstalbahn, 76.6 km (47.6 mi), steam engine.
- Zillertalbahn, from Jenbach to Mayrhofen, 33.1 km (20.6 mi), locomotive.
- numerous logging railways build from surplus military equipment after 1918, no longer in operation.

== 750mm gauge railway ==
- Dienstbahn der Internationalen Rheinregulierung, 25 km (16 mi). Common freight carrier and partly a heritage railway

== 600 mm (1 ft 11 5/8 in) railway lines ==
- Museumsfeldbahn Großgmain; 1.7 km (1.1 mi), operating
- Feistritzwaldbahn; 22 km (14 mi), defunct
- Kleinbahn Neusiedl am See; 1.5 km (0.93 mi), defunct
- Reißeck-Höhenbahn, 3.3 km (2.1 mi), defunct
- Schwertberger Kaolinzug; 3.8 km (2.4 mi), defunct
- Waldbahn Haselbach; 2.5 km (1.6 mi), defunct
- Waldbahn Naßwald; 2 km (1.2 mi), a defunct heritage railway
- Reisseck Mountain Railway

== 500 mm (19 3/4 in) railway lines ==
- Geriatriezentrum Am Wienerwald Feldbahn

== See also ==
- Feldbahn
- History of rail transport in Austria
- Jernbach Werke
- List of rack railways
- Mountain railway
- Rail transport in Austria
