= Trams in Subotica =

Subotica tram

Overview
- Locale: Subotica
- Transit type: Tram

Operation
- Began operation: September 7, 1897
- Ended operation: April 2, 1974

The Subotica tram system was a tram system in Subotica, Serbia. It was in operation from 7 September 1897 to 2 April 1974.

The first tram line went from the Sombor gate to the present day NAP gas station in Mali Bajmok over Rudic street, follogin Korz to Lake Palić. One tram from the system remains to this day, at the corner of Rudić street. (A further vehicle survives at the Lendcanaltramway in Klagenfurt, Austria.)

== Origins ==
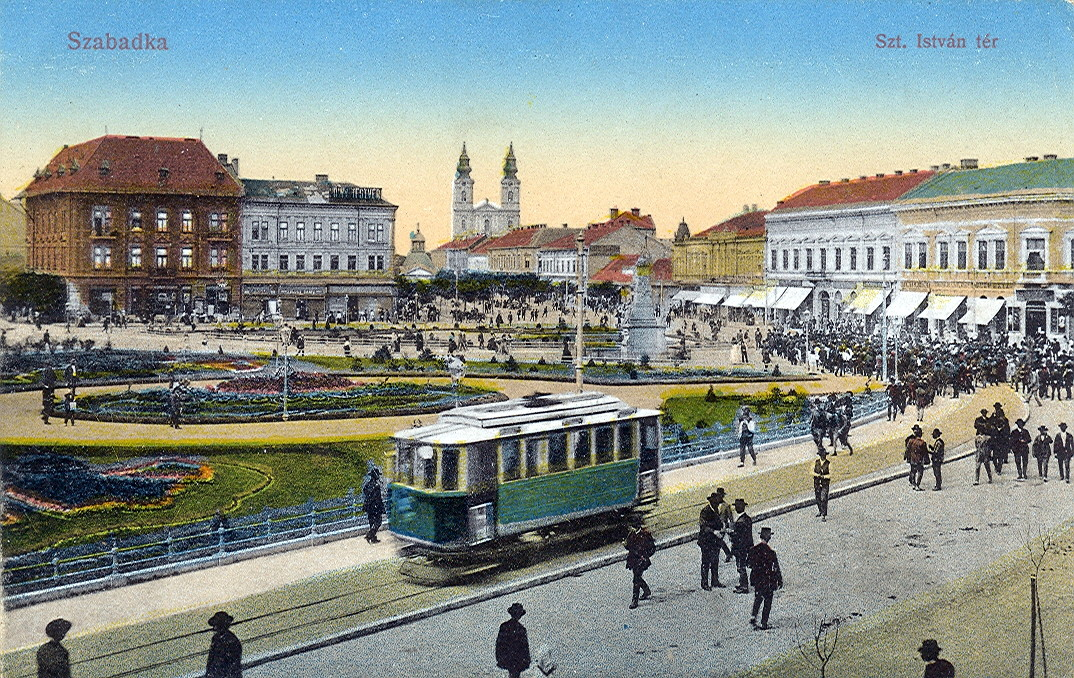
Subotica tram system, 1914.

The Subotica tram, put into operation in 1897, ran on electricity from the start. While neighbouring cities' trams at this date were often still horse-drawn, this gave the Subotica system an advantage over municipalities including Belgrade, Novi Sad, Zagreb, and Szeged. Its existence was important to the citizens of Subotica, as well as tourists who came to visit.

== Demise ==
Many tram systems in the former Yugoslavia closed in the 1950s. Subotica's system met the same fate, though later. Bus transport was seen as a cheaper alternative, and removing tramlines a way to free up space for cars. So, on the second of April, 1974, at 17:40, the tram was discontinued.

John Hartley Williams wrote a poem about the line, the "Lament for the Subotica-Palić Tramway".

== Future plans ==
There have been some efforts to investigate the reintroduction of the tram to the city. The city itself lacks funds to rebuild a system, so funding would have to come from other sources. Plans envisage the construction of a system of a similar length to the original one. In the 2010s, the neighbouring city of Szeged started making pre-feasibility studies about a regional Tram-train system, that could be extended across the border to Subotica.
