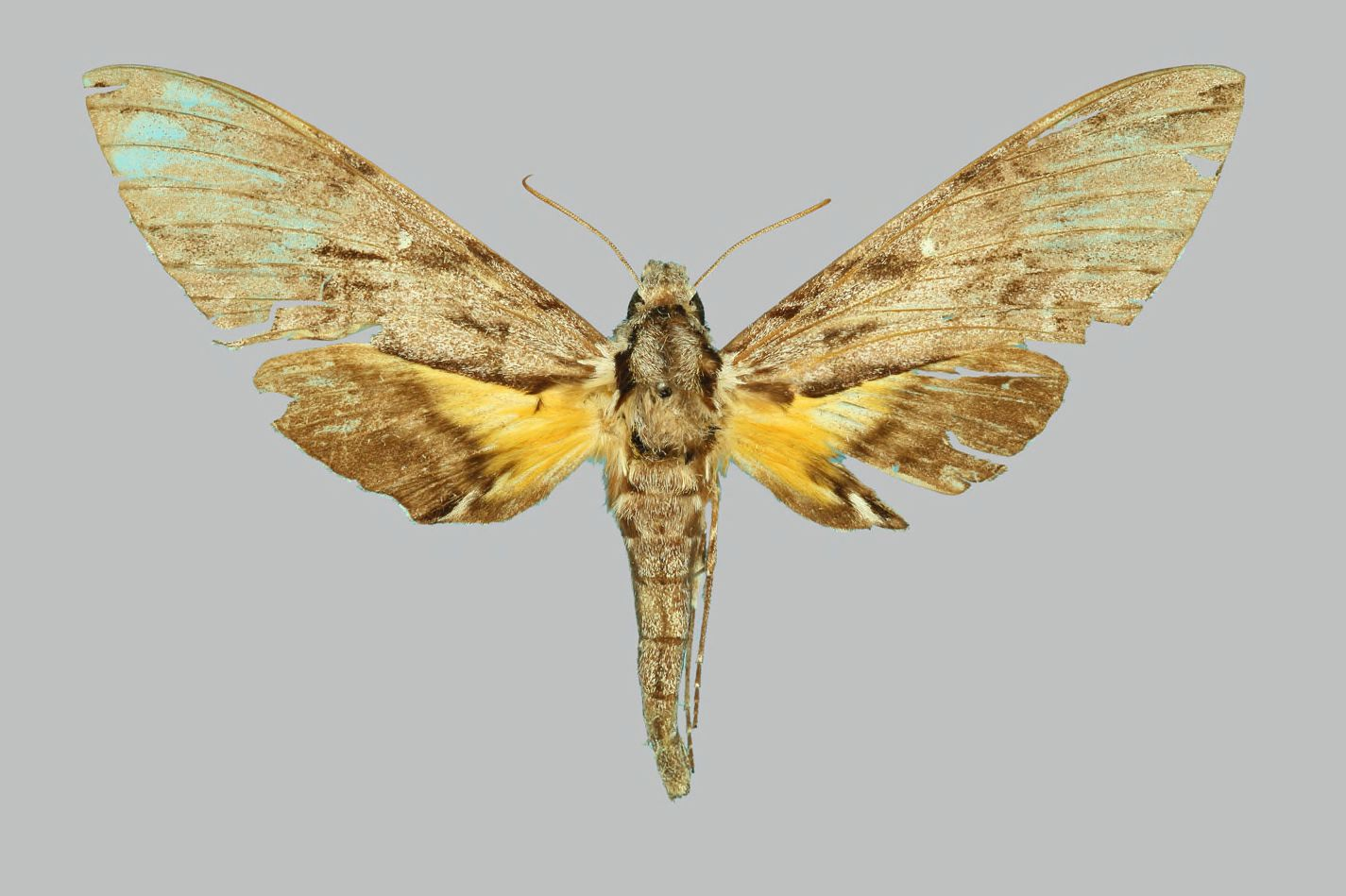

Scientific classification
- Domain: Eukaryota
- Kingdom: Animalia
- Phylum: Arthropoda
- Class: Insecta
- Order: Lepidoptera
- Family: Sphingidae
- Genus: Panogena
- Species: P. jasmini

Binomial name
- Panogena jasmini (Boisduval, 1875)

Synonyms
- Sphinx jasmini Boisduval, 1875; Diludia chromapteris Butler, 1877

= Panogena jasmini =

Species of moth

Panogena jasmini is a moth of the family Sphingidae. It is known from Madagascar.

The body and forewings are whitish grey (paler than Panogena lingens).

== Subspecies ==
- Panogena jasmini jasmini
- Panogena jasmini meridionalis Denso, 1944
