= Stern & Hafferl Verkehr =

Austrian train, bus, and boat operator

- Main region: Upper Austria
- Parent company: Stern Holding GmbH

Other
- Website: www.stern-verkehr.at

Stern & Hafferl Verkehrsgesellschaft m.b.H. is a transport company and wholly owned subsidiary of Stern Gruppe. It operates train and bus services in Upper Austria, Austria. The company owns and operates 105 km (65 mi) of railways which carry 4.7 million passengers per year. Since 2005 the company has also worked in partnership with Rail Cargo Group in rail freight and from the end of 2012 has provided locomotives for Rail Cargo Group trains on the Salzkammergut railway line and transports 9.4 million tonnes of freight per year.

== Services ==
Former logo

Stern and Hafferl operate services on four different railway lines:

- Linzer Lokalbahn: Linz - Eferding - Neumarkt im Hausruckkreis / Peuerbach (Line S5 of the Upper Austria S-Bahn)
- Atterseebahn: Vöcklamarkt - St.Georgen im Attergau - Attersee
- Vorchdorferbahn: Lambach - Vorchdorf
- Traunseebahn: Vorchdorf - Gmunden

The company also operates bus services and the Gmunden Tramway, which since 2018 has been connected to the Traunseebahn with through services operating over both.

A sister company, Atterseeschifffahrt, operates ferry services on the Attersee.

Stern & Hafferl also used to operate another four railway lines:

- Lambach - Haag am Hausruck, closed in December 2009
- Bürmoos - Ostermiething, transferred to Salzburger Lokalbahn in 1994
- Florianerbahn: Ebelsberg - Sankt Florian, closed in 1973
- Unterach am Attersee - See am Mondsee tramway, closed in 1951

== Rolling stock ==
The company operate a number of locomotives as well as railcars, which often resemble trams.

The company has a fleet of eight locomotives for freight operations.
