= Ella Lingens =

Austrian physician (1908–2002)

Ella Lingens-Reiner
- Born: Ella Reiner; 18 November 1908
- Died: 30 December 2002 (aged 94)
- Education: University of Vienna
- Notable work: Prisoners of Fear
- Spouse: Kurt Lingens (married 1938–1947)
- Children: Peter Michael Lingens
- Honours: Righteous Among the Nations

Ella Lingens-Reiner, M.D. (18 November 1908 – 30 December 2002) was an Austrian physician and is one of the Righteous Among Nations honored by Yad Vashem. She and her husband Kurt Lingens M.D., with Baron Karl von Motesiczky, harbored multiple Jews in their home during the Second World War. She was sent to Auschwitz by the Gestapo in 1942 and then later was imprisoned at Dachau. She survived the war and became president of the organization of former Auschwitz prisoners, Österreichische Lagergemeinschaft Auschwitz.

== Early life ==
Born on 18 November 1908 in Vienna, Lingens had a doctoral degree in law and studied medicine at the University of Vienna. She married Kurt Lingens, another physician who was active in an anti-fascist organisation, on 7 March 1938. Together they had a son, Peter Michael Lingens, on 8 August 1939. During the Austrian Civil War and the Social Democratic Party falling to the Austro-fascist state, Ella Lingens joined a circle of resistance fighters formed around Otto and Käthe Leichter. She worked in a legal advice centre run by the Social Democratic Party in Vienna, having been a member of their local branch executive.

== During the war ==
=== Arrest ===
Lingens' Gestapo Arrest Photo

When the Nazis annexed Austria, Ella became involved in the direct aid of Jews. During the Kristallnacht riots, she hid ten Jews in her room. In 1939, the Lingenses met Baron Karl von Motesiczky, an anti-Nazi who had studied medicine at the University of Vienna. They became close friends and were invited by the Baron to stay his home in the Hinterbrühl suburb of Vienna. Here Baron Motesiczky hosted many anti-Nazi resistance members and Jews during the Nazi occupation. During several months between 1941 and 1942, the Lingenses hid a young Jewish woman named Erika Felden in their apartment. They acquired cards for Felden from a married couple who were responsible for food-ration cards. When she came down with a gastrointestinal infection, the Lingenses’ housekeeper gave Felden her identity card so she could undergo medical treatment under an assumed name. During this period, the Lingenses aided other Jewish friends, using their apartment as a refuge, storing valuables, and using their connections to help friends escape the Gestapo. In 1942, Alex Weissberg-Cybulski, a Jewish acquaintance who was hiding in Krakow, requested that the Lingenses help him and some friends reach Hungary. The Lingenses asked a connection, Rudolf Klinger, to assist them, and he offered to accompany Weissberg-Cybulski and his friends to the border. Klinger was a Jewish former stage actor who was secretly working as an informer for the Gestapo. He had allowed one person to escape so as the ensure others could be caught with greater certainty. In August 1942, Weissberg-Cybulski sent two Jewish couples to Vienna, the brothers Bernhard and Jakob Goldstein and their wives Helene and Pepi. They came with the papers of Polish agricultural labourers, and stayed in the Lingenses' apartment for a few days. Klinger then brought them to the border, but suddenly turned them in to the Gestapo and reported the Lingenses and Baron Motesiczky. On 13 October 1942 the Lingenses and Baron Motesiczky were arrested. The Gestapo also found out that Felden had lived with them without being registered to the authorities. It also happened that they found a letter from Jewish friends who lived in the United States who were trying to get news about people whom they had left behind. Kurt was assigned to a unit of soldiers sent to the Russian front as a form of punishment. Ella and Baron Motesiczky were found guilty of aiding and abetting Jews and were sent to Auschwitz. The Lingenses' son was left behind in Vienna.

=== Imprisonment ===
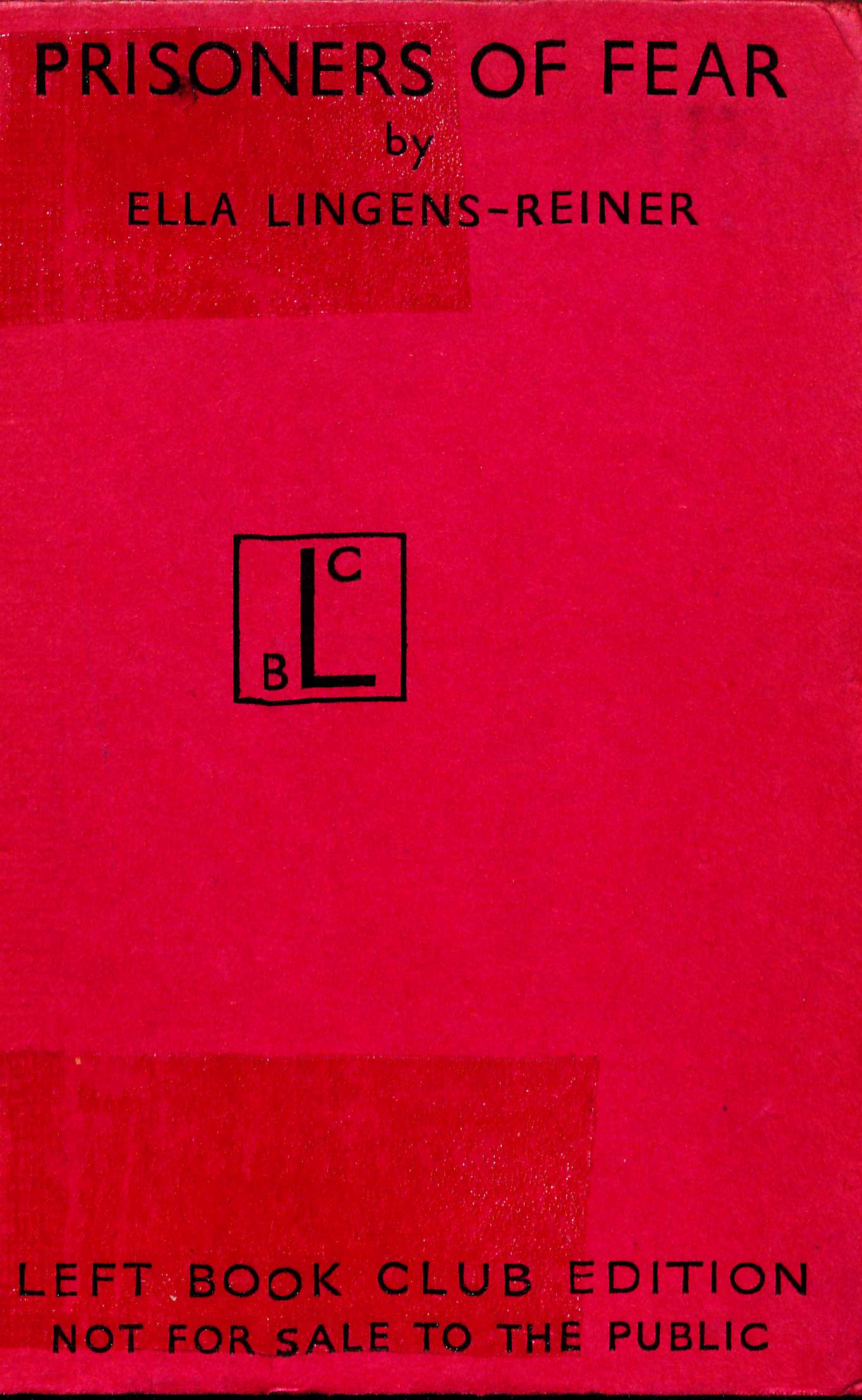
Cover of her memoir, Prisoners of Fear

On 15 February 1943 Ella was sent to the women's camp at the Birkenau-Auschwitz concentration camp. She was given the number 36,088. Almost immediately after her imprisonment, Ella became an essential part of the camp organization as a doctor in the camp hospital. Here she continued to save the lives of many camp prisoners, by hiding the most at risk from the selections for execution. She described in her memoir, Prisoners of Fear:

"We would hide women somewhere in the hut–the S.S. would order the names to be called out from the index cards in the hospital file. We would smuggle them into “Aryan” huts, or into huts where the selection had already taken place– they would check up a second time in all those huts. We would put their names on the list of patients due for release from the hospital and send their index cards to the office which handled the release formalities– they would prohibit any releases from the compound on selection days."

She suffered from a bout of typhus in August 1943 and was herself housed in the hospital hut, but survived. She continued to work in the hospital hut every day from eight in the morning to seven or eight at night. In December 1944, she was transferred to the Agfa-Commando factory camp, a sub-camp of Dachau. While there she retained her role as a camp doctor, and obtained marginally more freedom than she had experienced at Auschwitz. In January 1945, after weeks of poor food, Dutch women in the camp went on a work strike. The subsequent investigation led to Ella being accused of inciting the strike, and she was almost put on trial, which if convicted would have led to her execution. After this experience, her position at the camp deteriorated, and in mid-February she requested and was eventually moved to the main camp at Dachau. Dachau was liberated on 29 April 1945, slightly over two years after her initial imprisonment. In her memoir she credited her survival of the war on her identity as an "'Aryan,' a 'German,' and a doctor who could work professionally all the time."

== After the war ==
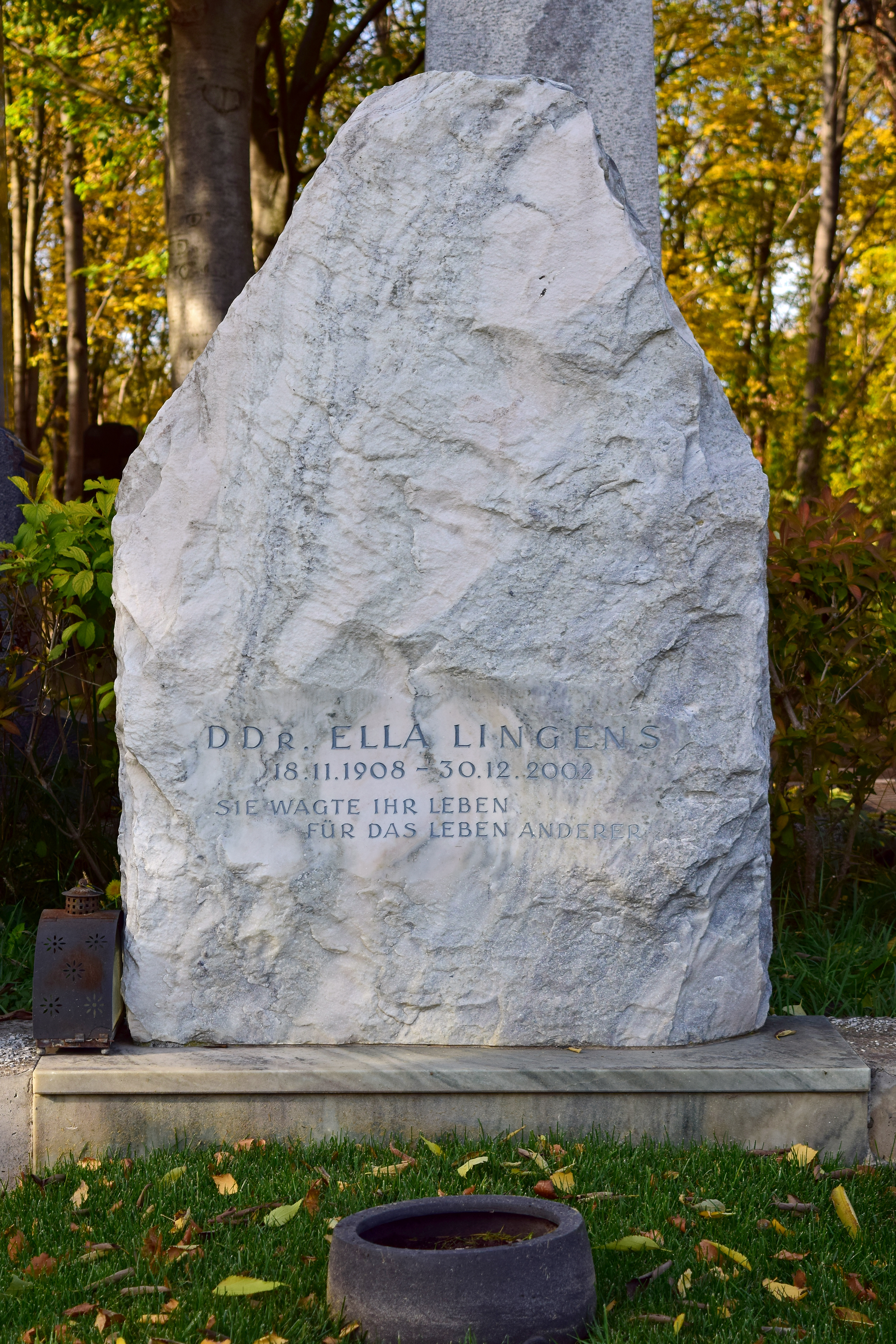
Grave of Ella Lingens in the Vienna Central Cemetery

After her release from Dachau in 1945, Ella returned to Vienna. She and Kurt divorced in 1947. She finished her studies at the University of Vienna, and then worked in multiple clinics and health care systems. She was a ministerial advisor at the Federal Ministry for Health and Environmental Protection. She spent much of her free time informing the public of the horrors of National Socialism and of her death camp experiences. She published a memoir of her time imprisoned, titled Prisoners of Fear, in 1948, which described many of the horrors of the camps and the small moments of humanity she found there. In early March 1964, Ella testified as a witness during the first Frankfurt Auschwitz trial. She served for many years as president of the organization of former Auschwitz prisoners (Osterreichische Lagergemeinschaft Auschwitz). Yad Vashem honored Ella Lingens-Reiner and Kurt Lingens with the Medal of Honor Righteous Among the Nations in Jerusalem in 1980. Ella Lingens-Reiner died on 30 December 2002 in Vienna. Her son Peter Michael Lingens later reported:

"A few days before she died, my mother got out of bed again. She leaned on the walls of the room and the long corridor and suddenly stood in the living room door, obviously a bit confused. While each conversation fell silent, she repeated a single sentence, her eyes wide in fear: You won't burn me? You won't burn me, will you?"

She was buried on 10 January 2003 in the Vienna Central Cemetery in an honorary grave (group 40, number 90).

== Legacy ==
=== Publications ===
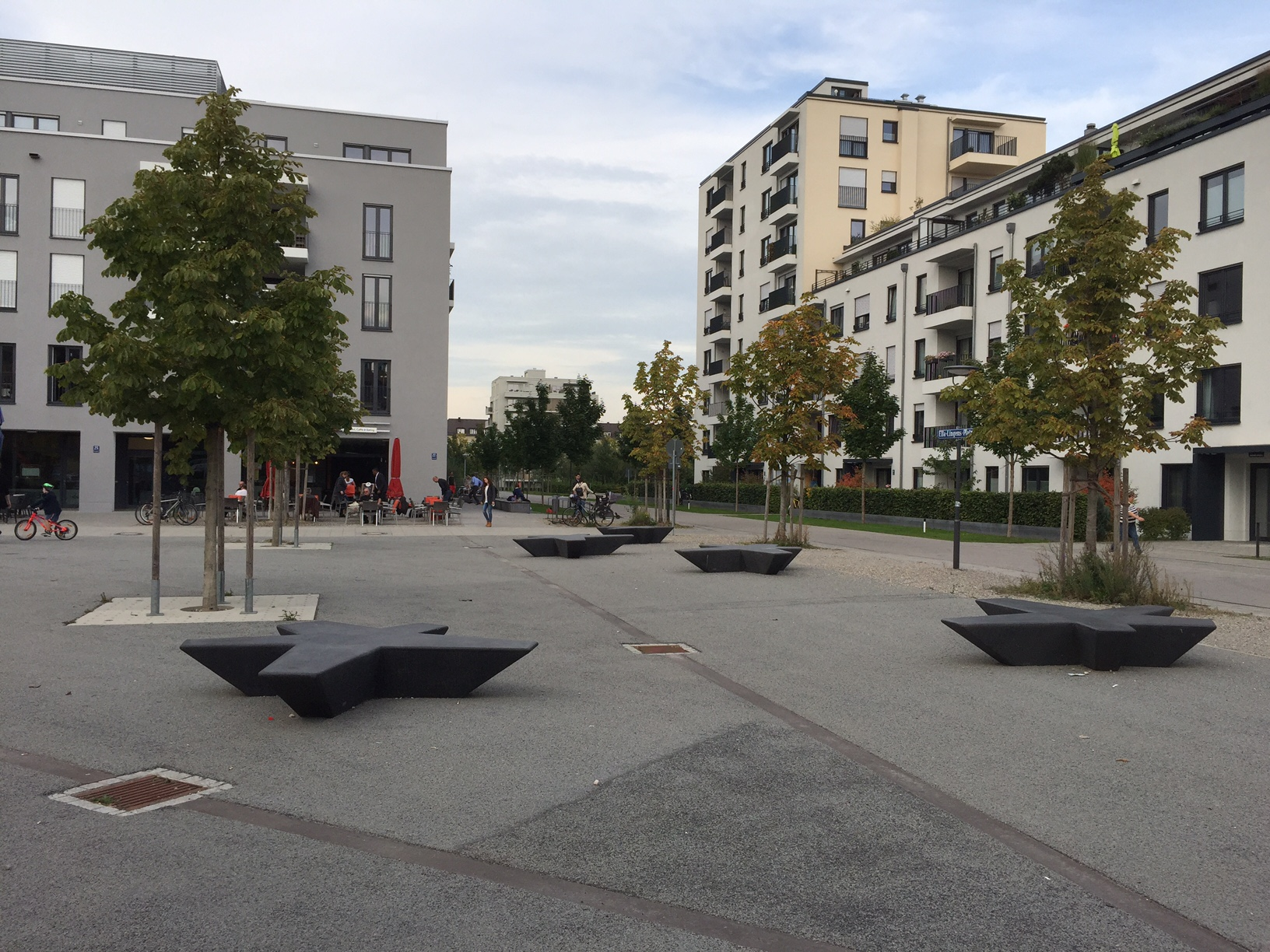
Ella-Lingens-Platz in Munich

- Lingens-Reiner, Ella (1948). Prisoners of Fear. London: Victor Gollancz. ISBN 978-9333394864.
- Adler, Hans Günther; Lingens-Reiner, Ella; Langbein, Herman (1990). Auschwitz: Zeugnisse u. Berichte (in German). Europäische Verlagsanstalt. ISBN 9783434460305.

=== Other ===
- A Viennese AHS in Floridsdorf (Gerasdorfer Straße 103) has been called Ella Lingens Gymnasium since 2006.
- In 2012, Ella-Lingens-Strasse in Vienna- Donaustadt (22nd district) was named after her.
- In Munich, a square in the district of Giesing was named Ella-Lingens-Platz after her in 2016.
