= Gmunden Tramway =

Tram system in Austria

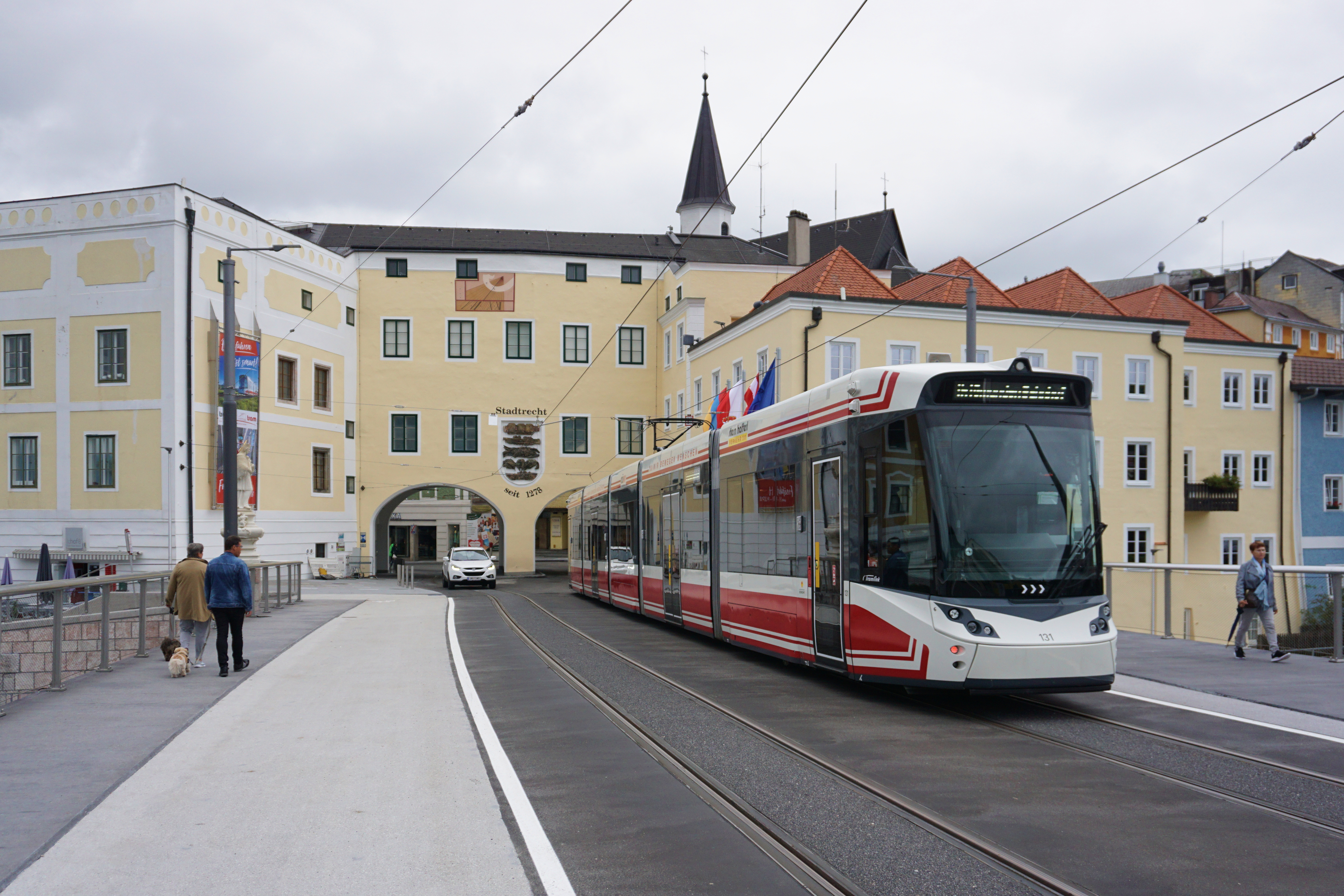
- Tramlink train on the Traun bridge

Overview
- Line number: 965 01
- Locale: Gmunden, Upper Austria, Austria
- Termini: Gmunden railway station; Klosterplatz (connection to Traunseebahn)
- Stations: 9 (Note: Not including Traunseebahn)

Service
- Type: Tram; Tram-train
- Route number: 161
- Operator: Stern & Hafferl
- Daily ridership: 2,260 (in 2019) (Note: Total including Traunseebahn)

History
- Opened: 13 August 1894

Technical
- Line length: 3.090 km (1.920 mi) (Note: 2.315 km (1.438 mi) before the extension at 1.9.2018.)
- Track gauge: 1,000 mm (3 ft 3 3/8 in)
- Minimum radius: 17 m (55 ft 9 in)
- Electrification: 600 V DC overhead line
- Maximum incline: 10.0%

The Gmunden Tramway (German: Straßenbahn Gmunden) is a tram line in the town of Gmunden in Upper Austria, Austria. The tramway opened in 1894 and since 2018 the line has been connected to the Traunseebahn as part of the Traunseetram tram-train service. It is operated by Stern & Hafferl. The line's maximum gradient of 10.0% makes it one of the world's steepest surviving adhesion-only tram lines.

== History ==
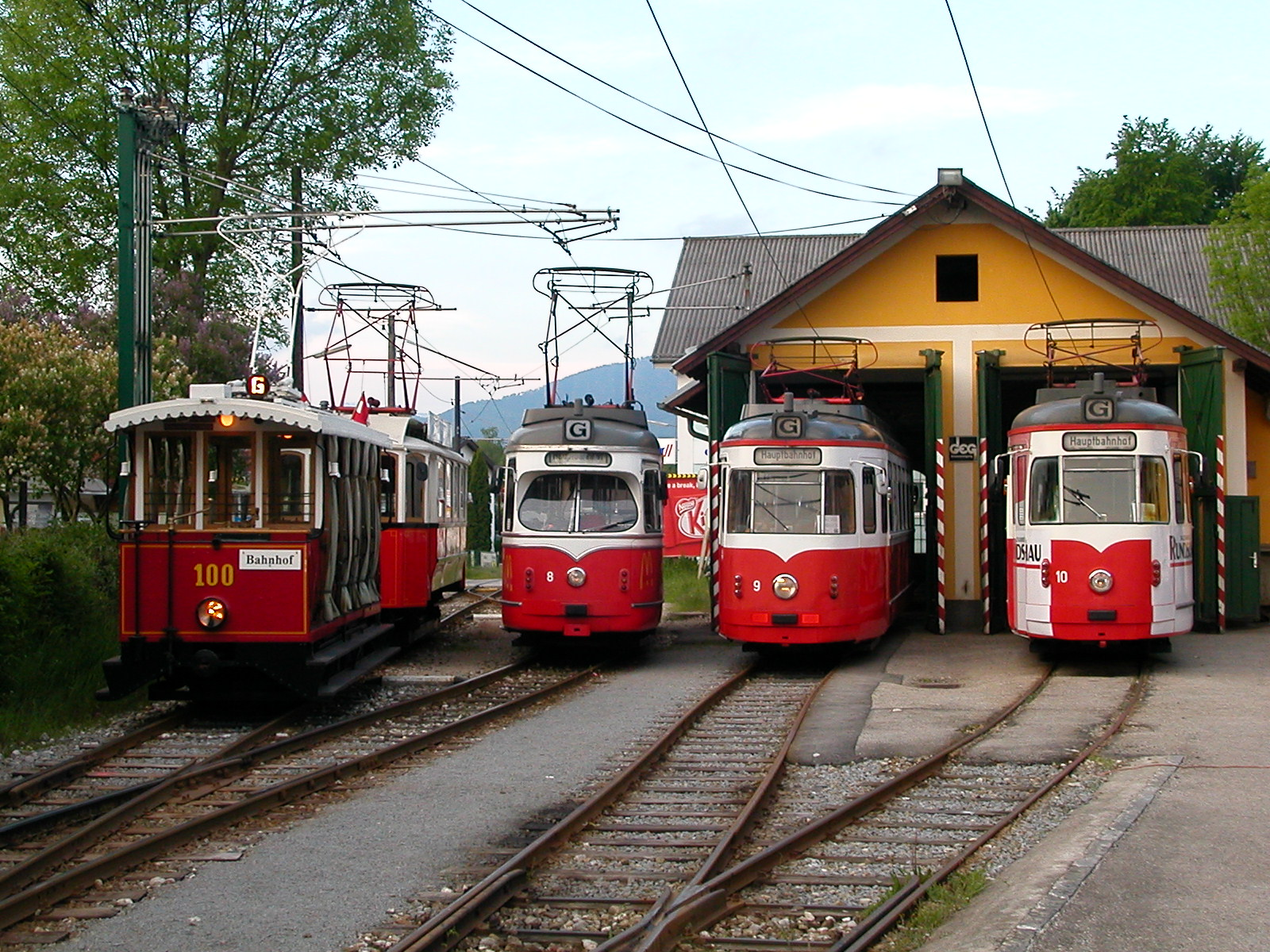
Vehicles at the tram depot in 2005

In 1875 when the Salzkammergutbahn was under construction there was a local campaign in Gmunden against a railway being built too close to the town centre. This led to Gmunden station (called the Rudolfsbahnhof at the time) being a considerable distance from the town centre and considerably higher. The inconvenience of this led to proposals for a tramway linking the railway station to the town centre. Gmunden's mayor also wanted electric lighting in the town and a combining this electricity supply project with an electric tramway was considered financially more worthwhile.

Construction work, directed by the engineers Josef Stern and Franz Hafferl, began in 1894. It took eight months to build the entire tramway, depot and power plant. The single-track line ran 2.5 km (1.6 mi), from the railway station to Rathausplatz (Town Hall Square), with nine stops. The line opened on 13 August 1894 as the first electric tramway in Austria and was operated by three electric railcars built by Hofwagenfabrik Rohrbacher in Vienna.

Although the line runs in the street it was originally built as a local railway (Lokalbahn) and only legally became a tramway on 28 September 1937. The only operational change was fitting indicators to the vehicles.

In 1975 the section of the line from Franz-Josef-Platz to Rathausplatz was closed to make more space for road traffic, leaving the tramway only 2.3 km (1.4 mi) long. The shortening of the route led to a drop in passenger numbers and the tramway was threatened with closure until in 1989 the Pro Gmundner Straßenbahn association was founded to financially support and lobby for the tramway.

There were several renovations in the late 1990s and the following decade, including the renewal of "Keramik" station and of the Tennisplatz – Franz-Josef-Platz route.

Until its extension and connection to the Traunseebahn the line was unusual in that all platforms were on the same side of the single-track line and the cars that ran on it only had doors on one side.

== Connection to Traunseebahn ==
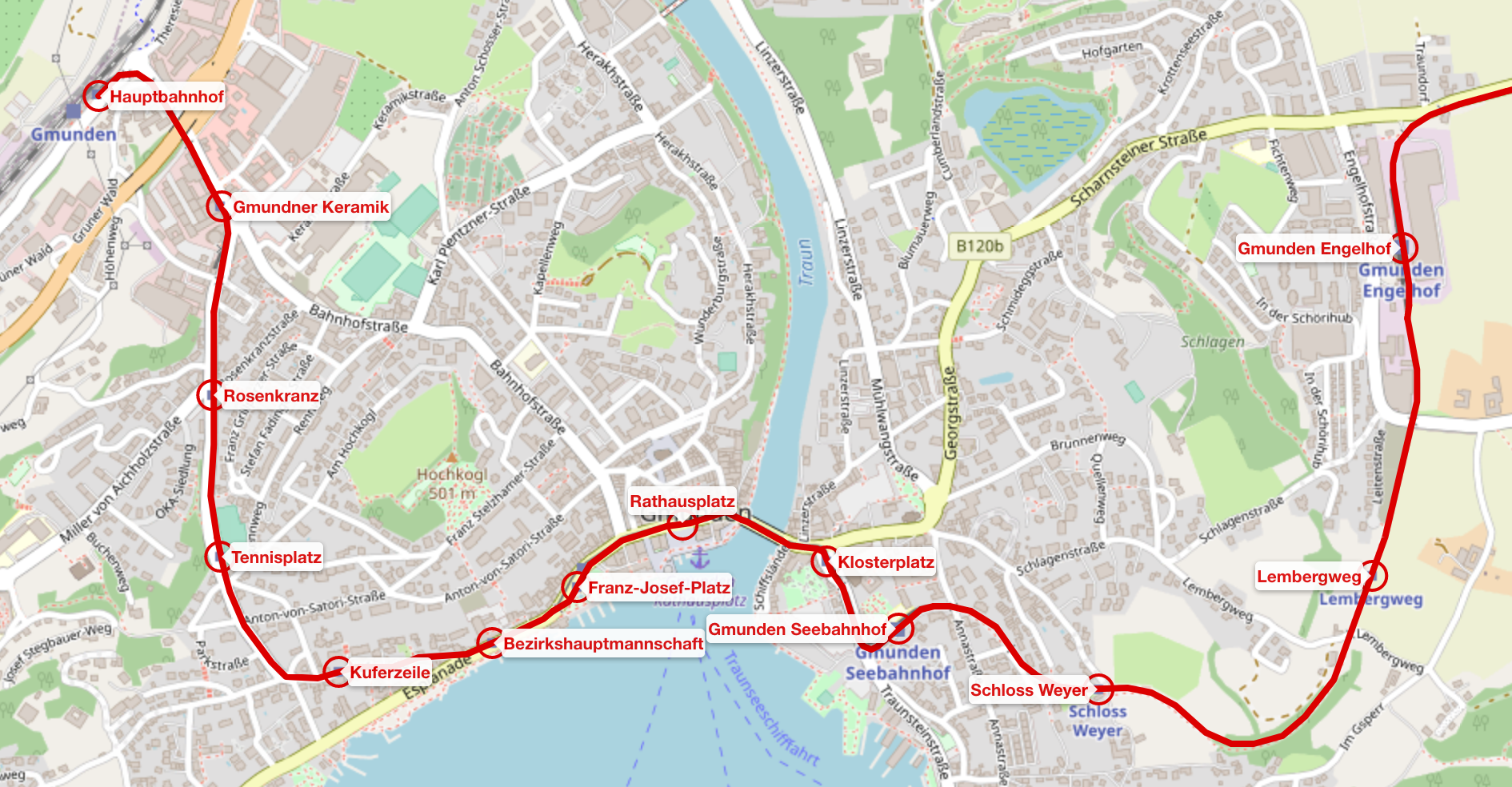
Map of the Gmunden tramway and the connection to the Traunseebahn

In February 2013, the municipal council of Gmunden decided to link the tram to the Traunseebahn, a metre-gauge railway running from Gmunden to Vorchdorf. This involved building 700 m of new track, including rebuilding a road bridge over the Traun, and replacing the rolling stock on both lines with new low-floor trams.

Construction of a new double-track line from Franz-Josef-Platz to Klosterplatz (via Rathausplatz, the original terminus) began in 2015, followed by reconstruction of the Traun bridge in 2017. The first test trains ran over the new track in August 2018 and the Traunseetram from Gmunden to Vorchdorf began operation on 1 September 2018. The town section of the line (from Gmunden railway station to Engelhof station on the Traunseebahn) is served by four trams per hour on weekdays and two on weekends, with half of these continuing to Vorchdorf.

== Rolling stock ==
=== Tramlink ===
The Traunseetram is currently operated by a fleet of Tramlink low-floor trams. Stern & Hafferl ordered eleven of these vehicles, numbered ET 121–131, from Vossloh España (now part of Stadler Rail) in 2013. Eight are used on the Traunseetram and the other three on the Attergaubahn. They are five-section 100% low-floor multi-articulated trams with a capacity of 175 passengers, including 60 seats and 15 folding seats. The first trams entered service on the Traunseebahn in 2016. One vehicle was brought to the Gmunden Tramway for tests on the 10% gradients, but the tram depot did not have space to store the new vehicles so they did not enter passenger service in the town until through services began running over the connection to the Traunseebahn. Of the eight Tramlink vehicles, seven are needed to operate the planned timetable and the other serves as a reserve.

No.	Image	Origin	Year built	Length	Weight	Maximum speed	Power output
ET 121–123, ET 127–131	Tram ET 121	Vossloh España / Stadler Rail Valencia	2016	32 m	41.3 t	70 km/h	4 × 100 kW

=== Former fleet ===
No.	Image	Origin	Year built	Length	Weight	Maximum speed	Power output	Remarks
1	Tram 1	Rohrbacher/AEG	1894	8 m	6.6 t	25 km/h	2 × 13 kW	Rebuilt in 1933; scrapped 1952
2		Rohrbacher/AEG	1894	8 m	6.6 t	25 km/h	2 × 13 kW	Rebuilt in 1935; scrapped 1962
3		Rohrbacher/AEG	1894	8 m	6.6 t	25 km/h	2 × 13 kW	Rebuilt in 1938; sold to Kärntner Eisenbahnfreunde in 1975
4 (I)		Rohrbacher/AEG	1895	8 m	6.6 t		2 × 13 kW	Transferred to Vorchdorf (Traunseebahn) in 1935 and scrapped in 1950
4 (II)	Tram 4	Ganz & Co.	1913	9.53 m	13 t		2 × 40.5 kW	From the Pressburger Bahn in 1941, rebuilt and entered service in 1951; sold to Mariazell Tramway Museum in 1983
5	Tram 5	Grazer Waggonfabrik/SSW	1911	9.08 m	11.0 t	30 km/h	2 × 26 kW	
6		Grazer Waggonfabrik/Siemens	1907	8.7 m	10.3 t		2 × 22.5 kW	Transferred from Unterach–See Tramway in 1943; transferred to Atterseebahn (Vöcklamarkt – Attersee) and rebuilt to unpowered carriage
7	Tram 7	Grazer Waggonfabrik/Siemens	1907	8.7 m	10.3 t		2 × 22.5 kW	Transferred from Unterach–See Tramway; loaned to Florianerbahn museum tramway and regauged to 900 mm
8	Tram 8	Lohner/Kiepe	1961	13.4 m	17.0 t	60 km/h	2 × 100 kW	Fitted with full pantograph; built with doors on only one side; rebuilt in 1978 for one-man operation
9	Tram 9	Ex-Vestische Straßenbahnen 347, built by Duewag/Kiepe	1952	14.3 m	17.0 t	70 km/h	200 kW	Entered service in Gmunden in 1977; doors on the off side sealed
10	Tram 10	Ex-Vestische Straßenbahnen 341, built by Duewag/Kiepe	1952	14.3 m	17.0 t	70 km/h	200 kW	Entered service in Gmunden in 1983; doors on the off side sealed
100	Tram 100	Ex-Pöstlingbergbahn car IV; built by Grazer Waggonfabrik	1898	6.8 m	8.8 t	14 km/h	40.8 kW	Open-sided; fitted with a bow collector. Acquired from the Pöstlingbergbahn in 1995

Trams 5, 8 and 100 are still in operational condition in Gmunden, kept in the line's original depot, and used for special services. They have been modified to comply with railway (as well as tramway) regulations in order to run as far as Engelhof on the Traunseebahn.

== See also ==
- Trams in Europe
- List of town tramway systems in Austria
