= Karl Motesiczky =

Austrian student (1904–1943)

Karl Motesiczky

Karl Wolfgang Franz Count Motesiczky (born 25 May 1904, in Vienna; d. 25 June 1943) was an Austrian student of medicine and psychoanalysis and an active opponent of Nazism. After the German annexation of Austria, Motesiczky used his manor in Hinterbrühl to shelter Jews and other persecuted persons. He was arrested by the Gestapo on October 13, 1942, for helping Jews to flee to Switzerland. Following his deportation he perished in Auschwitz concentration camp. Posthumously, he was honoured as a Righteous Among the Nations.

== Early life ==
Karl Motesiczky is descended from a wealthy Viennese aristocratic family. The family had a huge manor in Hinterbrühl at the Kröpfelsteig. His father, the Hungarian Edmund von Motesiczky de Kesselökeö, was a chemist who died in 1909. His mother, Baroness Henriette von Motesiczky, born von Lieben, left the care of her children to nannies, governesses and other staff but she made sure that Karl was brought up to a democratic point of view.

From 1914 he attended preparatory high school, and from 1920 he also studied cello at the Vienna Imperial Academy of Music and the Performing Arts. After his graduation, Motesiczky studied at the University of Vienna, first medicine, then law.

In 1924 he became friends with the author Heimito von Doderer and organized readings in Vienna and later in Heidelberg, Frankfurt and Mannheim for him. In 1928 he moved to Heidelberg, and in 1930 to Marburg, where he studied philosophy and theology. Due to his commitment to the socialist student movement, he came in contact with the Communist Party of Germany.

== Exile ==
In 1931, he moved to Berlin, where he met the left-wing Viennese psychoanalyst Wilhelm Reich. He became his patient and student and in 1933, after Hitler's seizure of power, they emigrated together from Copenhagen to Oslo, where Reich continued his work. Motesiczky became an author and a financial backer of Reich's Zeitschrift für Politische Psychologie und Sexualökonomie (Magazine for Political Psychology and Sexual Economy).

From 1934 to 1938, Motesiczky published several political articles for this magazine under the pseudonym Karl Teschitz and the book Religion, Kirche, Religionsstreit in Deutschland (Religion, Church, and Religious Disputes in Germany). In Oslo, he studied medicine and treated patients by psychoanalysis under Reich's supervision. When he became disillusioned with Reich, he returned to Austria in 1937.

== Return to Austria ==
After the German annexation of Austria on 12 March 1938, his Jewish mother and his sister Marie-Louise Motesiczky fled the next day to the Netherlands. Although he was of Jewish descent, he stayed in Austria after the Nazis took over. He continued his study of medicine at the University of Vienna and joined an informal psychoanalytical training seminary led by August Aichhorn. Following the forced dissolution of the Vienna Psychoanalytical Association, the meetings were illegal and had to be held in Aichhorn's apartment. Due to his classification as "mixed race (first degree)" by the Nuremberg Laws, Motesiczky was not allowed to continue his training when the seminar gained official recognition in 1941. In 1940 he received permission to finish his study of medicine because he had already passed his first medical exam. However, he was informed that persons of mixed race would not receive a licence to practice.

=== Resistance ===
His mansion in Hinterbrühl became a meeting point for Jewish families and non-Jewish opponents of National Socialism, for example the pianists Erna Gál and Isa Strasser, Ernst Wildgans, the Przibrams, Ella Lingens and Kurt Lingens. If someone were in danger of getting captured by Gestapo, he harboured them, and helped many emigrate. In autumn 1939, he founded a resistance group with some friends, including Ella and Kurt Lingens and Robert Lammer.

In July 1942, two couples fleeing from occupied Kracow came to Vienna in order to get to Switzerland with his help. Denounced by an intermediary, Motesiczky was arrested with Ella Lingens by the Gestapo on October 13, 1942; after four months in the Gestapo prison in Vienna, he was deported to Auschwitz concentration camp, where he died of typhus on 25 June 1943.

== Heritage ==
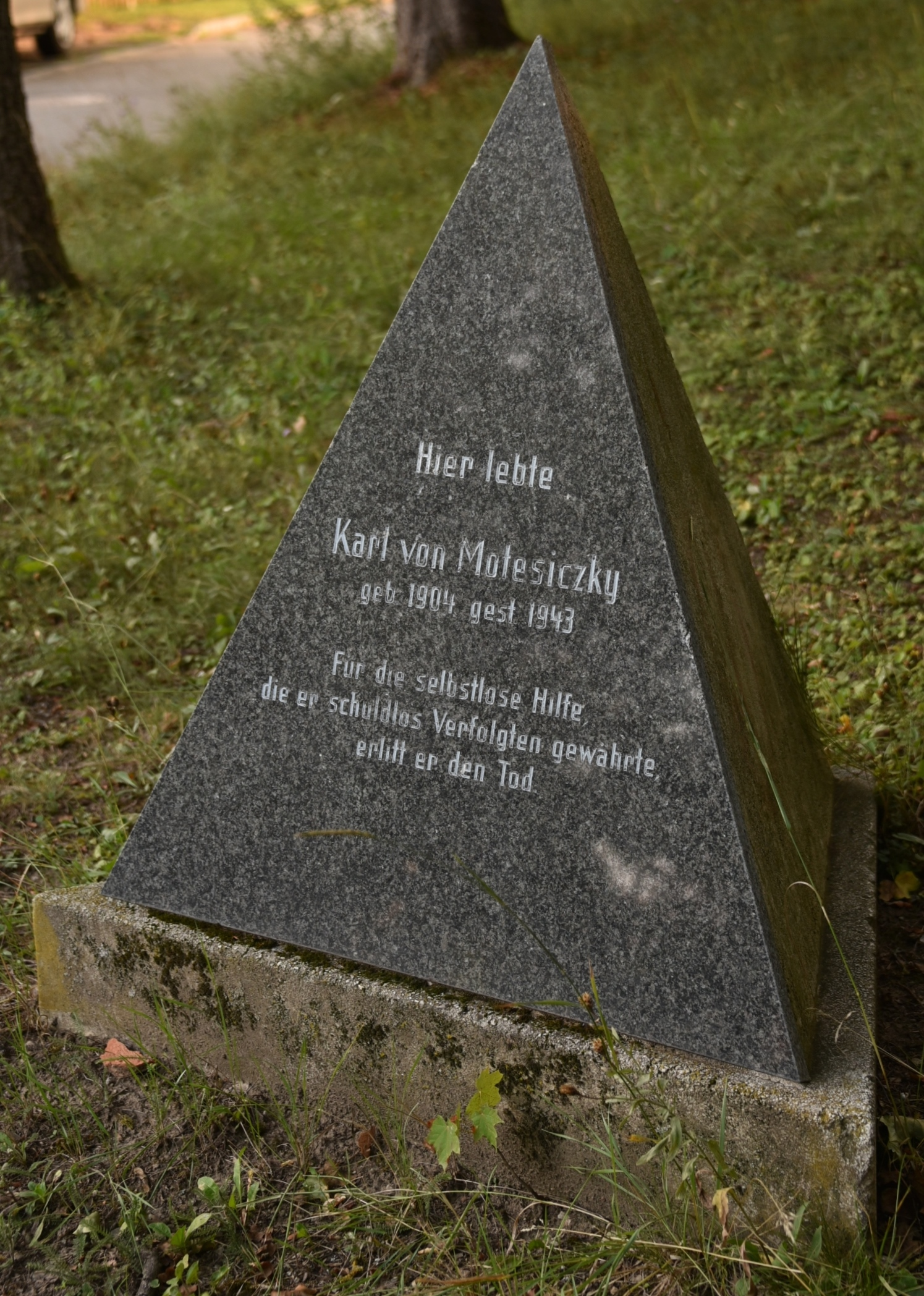
Motesiczky's memorial in Hinterbrühl

In 1980, Motesiczky was awarded the honour medal Righteous Among the Nations by Yad Vashem in Jerusalem.

His memory was honoured in August 2019 by the Raoul Wallenberg Foundation, which designated Motesiczky's former property at Hinterbrühl as one of the ‘Houses of Life’ to acknowledge the sacrifice that Karl Motesiczky and his companions made in sheltering those fleeing from or resisting Nazism. The property was restituted to his mother and sister after the war and sold by them in the mid-1950s to SOS Kinderdorf, an international charity that runs a chain of ‘villages’ worldwide for humanitarian work with children. His mother and his sister also arranged for a memorial to be built there for Karl in 1961. Motesiczky's memorial was destroyed in summer 2000 and defaced with swastikas so it had to be restored. In 2007, a Stolperstein was placed in front of the main building of the SOS-Children's Villages.

== Publications ==
- Religion, Kirche, Religionsstreit in Deutschland. Kopenhagen: Sexpol-Verlag 1935 (Politisch-Psychologische Schriftenreihe der Sexpol Nr. 3)
- Religiöse Ekstase als Ersatz der sexuellen Auslösung: Beobachtungen in einer religiösen Sekte. Kopenhagen: Sexpol-Verlag 1937 (Populäre Schriftenreihe der Sexpol Nr. 2) (online)
- Publication is the Zeitschrift für Politische Psychologie und Sexualökonomie (ZPPS) Reprinted in Hans-Peter Gente (Hg.): Marxismus, Psychoanalyse, Sexpol. Band 1. Frankfurt/M: Fischer-TB 1970
  - Zur Kritik der kommunistischen Politik in Deutschland (ZPPS 3/4, 1934, S. 256–258), S. 203–219
  - Aus der internationalen Sexpol-Diskussion (ZPPS 1/2, 1936, S. 43–49), S. 221–228 (online)
  - Rezension: Erich Fromm: Autorität und Familie. Sozialpsychologischer Teil (ZPPS 3/4, 1936, S. 176–178), S. 307–309 (online)

== Sources ==
- Rothländer, Christiane (2009): Karl Motesiczky. Eine biographische Rekonstruktion. Wien: Turia & Kant. ISBN 978-3-85132-537-9
