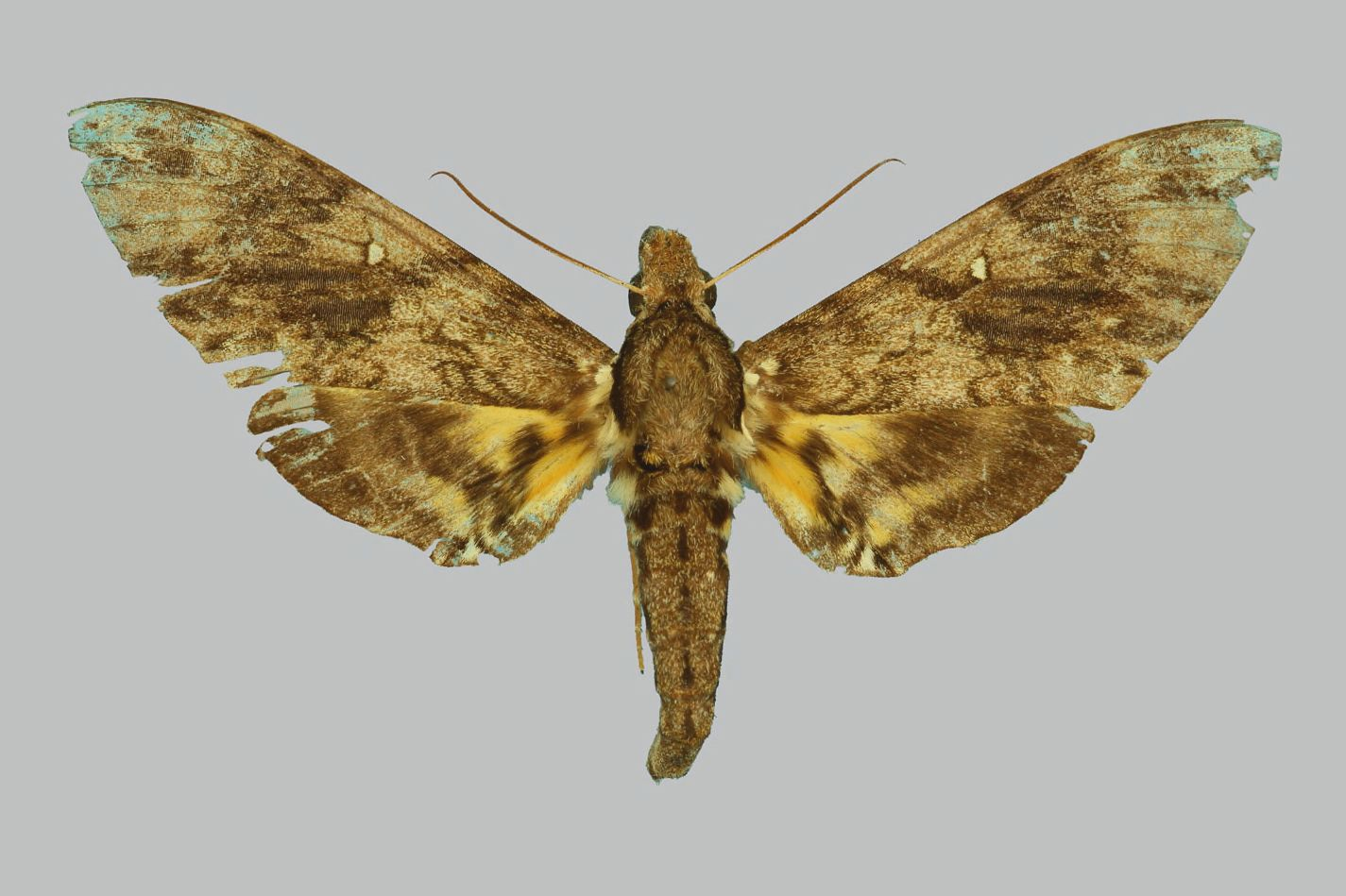
- Panogena lingens

Scientific classification
- Domain: Eukaryota
- Kingdom: Animalia
- Phylum: Arthropoda
- Class: Insecta
- Order: Lepidoptera
- Family: Sphingidae
- Tribe: Sphingini
- Genus: Panogena; Rothschild & Jordan, 1903

= Panogena =

Genus of moths

Panogena is a genus of moths in the family Sphingidae. The genus was erected by Walter Rothschild and Karl Jordan in 1903.

== Species ==
- Panogena jasmini (Boisduval 1875)
- Panogena lingens (Butler 1877)
