= Kurt Lingens =

German militant & physician (1912–1966)

Kurt Ludwig Josef Maria Lingens (31 May 1912 – 1966) was a German anti-fascist militant and physician. He and his wife, Ella Lingens, were honoured by Yad Vashem, which named them Righteous Among the Nations.

== Life ==
Kurt Ludwig Josef Maria Lingens was born on 31 May 1912, in Düsseldorf. He was disqualified from all German academies in 1933 because of his membership in an anti-fascist group of students. His father, chief of police in Cologne, Germany, was fired from his job in 1936 because he was associated with the Catholic, anti-Nazi Zentrumspartei, and because he had tried to thwart Sturmabteilung persecution of Catholics.

His wife Ella had a doctoral degree in law and studied medicine at the University of Vienna. When the Nazis annexed Austria, she began to help Jews, especially students she knew through her studies. For example, during the Kristallnacht pogrom, she hid 10 Jews in her room.

In 1939, the Lingenses met and became friends with Baron Karl von Motesiczky, an anti-Nazi whose mother was Jewish, and who until that time had – like Ella – studied medicine in the University of Vienna. Motesiczky invited the Lingenses to live in a large house he owned in the Vienna suburb of Hinterbrühl during the summer months. At this house, the Baron often hosted Jews and members of the anti-Nazi resistance, and he, the Lingenses, and other collaborators hid and provided other assistance to Jews.

In summer 1942, the Nazi regime began to deport Jewish people from Vienna. Many Jews asked the Lingens couple for help. Some of the Jewish people stored their valuables at the Lingens' home. Additionally, the anti-Nazi Polish underground movement, with which the couple worked together, asked them to help two Jewish couples to escape or to find a suitable hideaway.

== Arrests and punishment ==
On 13 October 1942, the Lingenses and Motesiczky were arrested because they financially supported members of the Polish resistance and because they distributed faked IDs. They, some of their collaborators, and some people they'd helped had been betrayed by their "friend", Rudolf Klinger, a Jewish former stage actor who was later proven to be a Nazi informant.

Motesiczky and the couple were taken to the Gestapo headquarters at Morzin square, next to "Schwedenplatz". After a short custody Kurt Lingens was transferred to a penalty military unit comprising soldiers who were sent to the Russian front as a form of punishment for various crimes. While at the front, Lingens sustained serious injuries.

Ella and Motesiczky were sent to Auschwitz; Motesiczky died there of typhus on 25 June 1943. Ella was assigned as a doctor of the camp to inmates and managed to save a number of Jews from being murdered in the gas chambers; she was sent on a death march from Auschwitz to Dachau and managed to survive until the end of the war.

Klinger, the Gestapo informant, was arrested in 1943 after his handlers decided he could no longer be useful to them. He was sent to Auschwitz, where he was murdered.

== Post-war ==
After World War II Kurt Lingens first worked in a paediatric clinic in Vienna and then emigrated to the United States, where he worked as a psychiatrist. Kurt Lingens died in 1966.

In 1980, he was posthumously honoured by Yad Vashem with the medal of honour, "Righteous Among the Nations". His widow, Ella, was given the award that same year.

The Lingenses' son is the Austrian journalist Peter Michael Lingens.
