= Traunseebahn =

Railway line in Austria

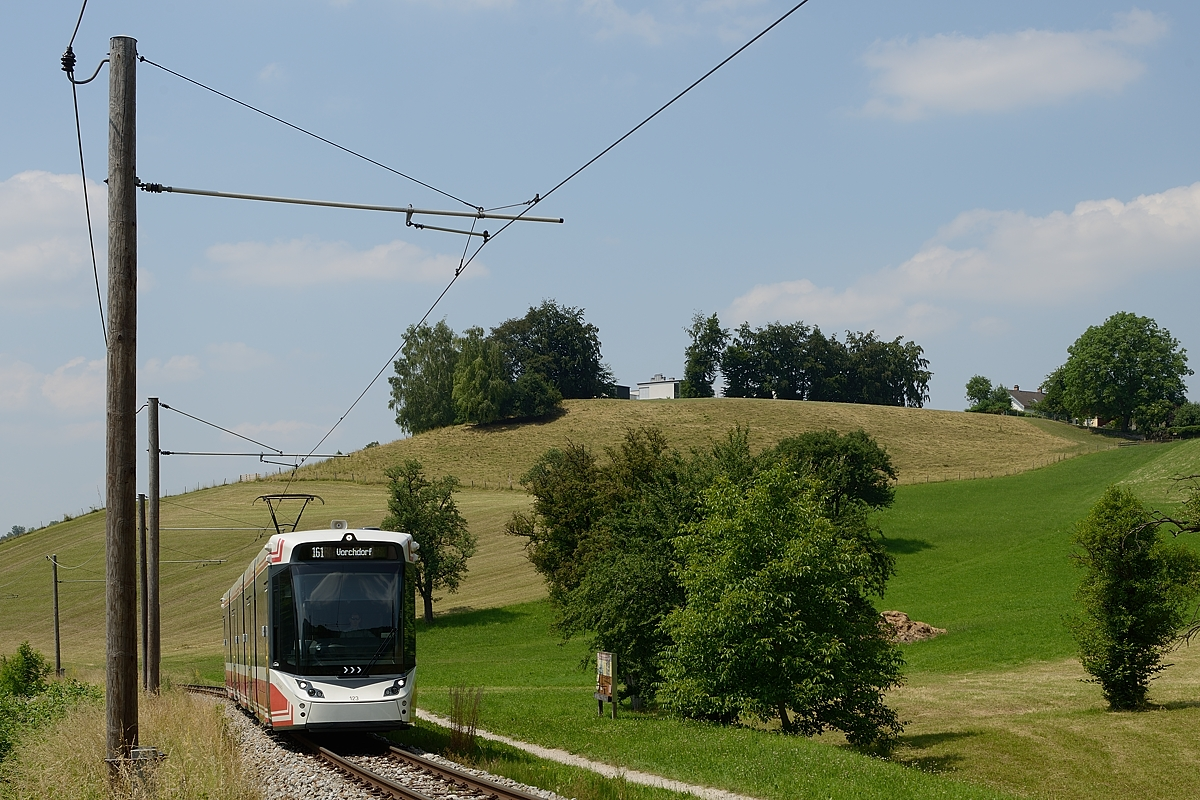
- Tramlink train on the Traunseebahn

Overview
- Locale: Upper Austria, Austria
- Termini: Gmunden (connection to tramway); Vorchdorf

Service
- Type: Tram-train
- Operator(s): Stern & Hafferl
- Ridership: 1,021,928 (2024)

History
- Opened: 21 March 1912; 113 years ago

Technical
- Line length: 17.9 km (11.1 mi) (including Gmunden tramway)
- Number of tracks: Single track
- Track gauge: 1,000 mm (3 ft 3 3/8 in)
- Electrification: 600 V DC Gmunden – Engelhof; 750 V DC Engelhof – Vorchdorf
- Operating speed: 60 km/h (37 mph)
Route map
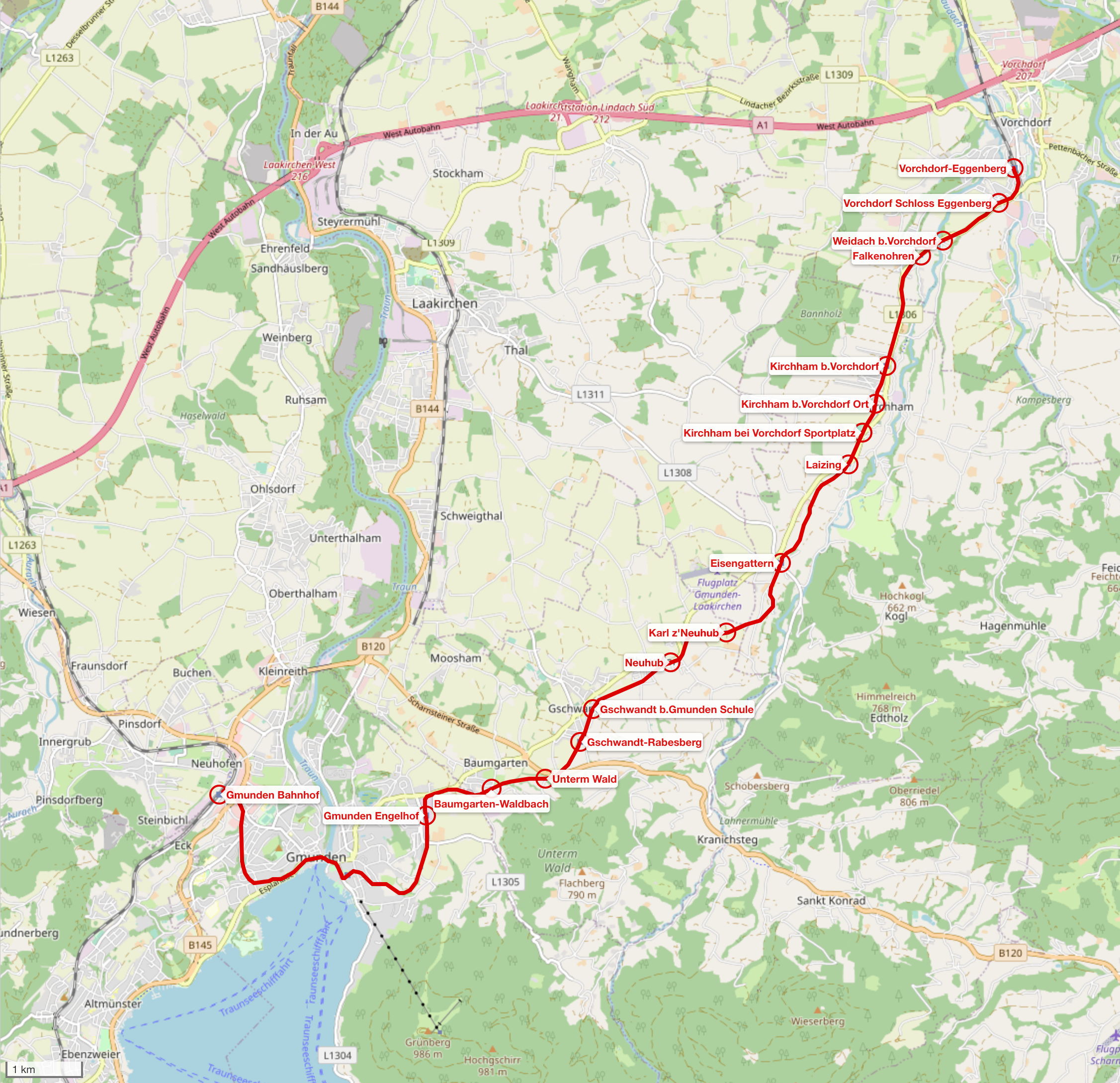

The Traunseebahn is an electrified metre-gauge railway running from Vorchdorf to Gmunden in Upper Austria, Austria. The line is 17.9 km (11.1 mi) long and is owned and operated by Stern & Hafferl. The railway opened on 21 March 1912 and since 2018 it has been connected to the Gmunden Tramway as part of the Traunseetram tram-train service.

== History ==
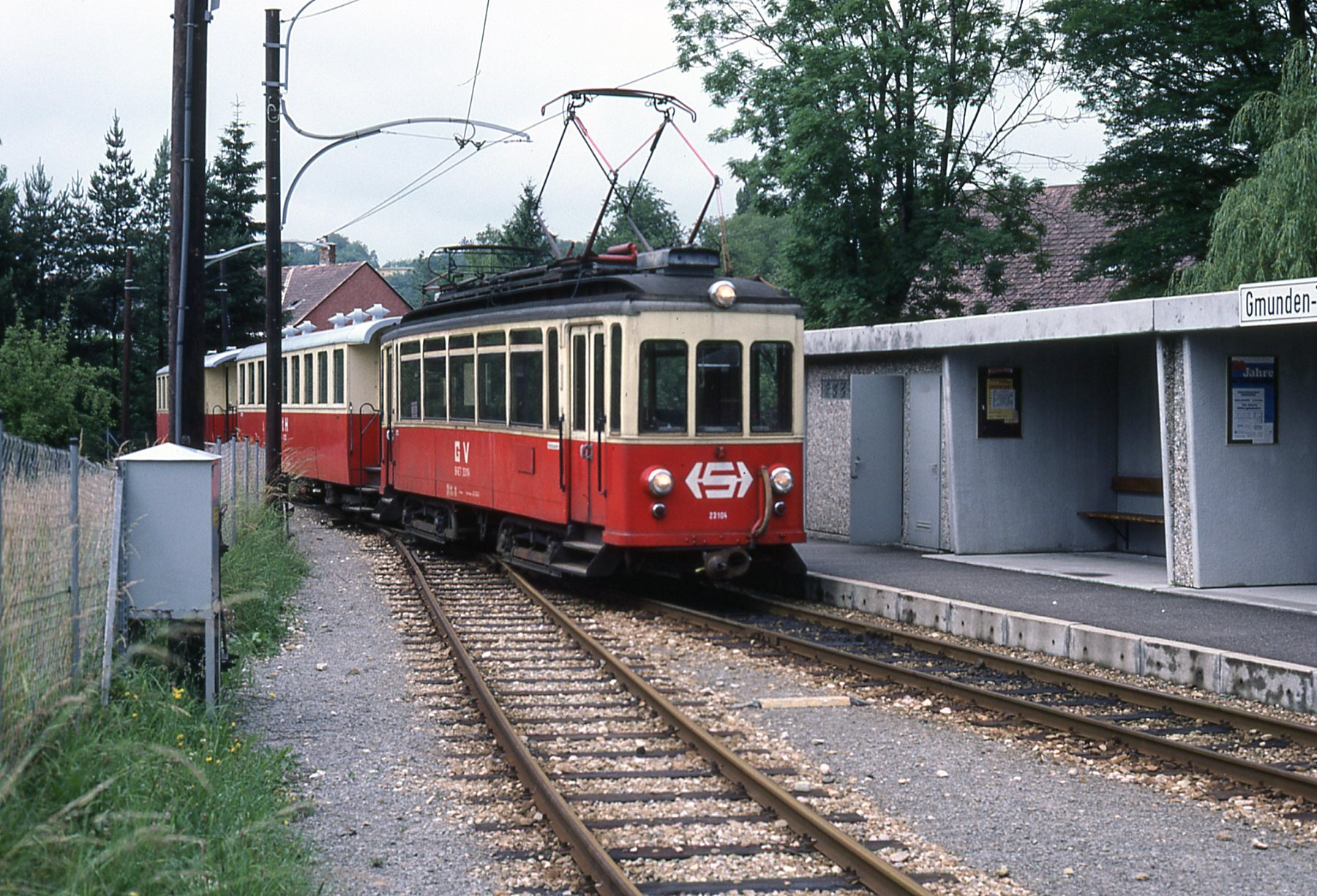
Gmunden Traundorf station in 1983

Plans for a railway linking Gmunden - then a successful spa resort - to the agricultural area around Vorchdorf had been made as early as the 1890s, when the Gmunden Tramway opened, but it was not until 1911 that the town of Gmunden was issued a concession to build and operate a line for a period of 90 years. The concession was taken over by Stern & Hafferl and construction began in May 1911. The railway was 15 km (9.3 mi) long and opened on 21 March 1912. A connection to the Gmunden Tramway had also been planned, but could not be constructed because the road bridge over the Traun was not suitable. Early investment in electrification allowed the railway to remain viable where a steam railway would not.

For a short section in Gmunden the Traunseebahn shared the route of the standard-gauge line from Lambach operated by ÖBB, requiring dual-gauge track. The two lines originally each had their own station in Gmunden, the metre-gauge at Gmunden Traundorf and the standard-gauge at Gmunden See. In 1990 the terminus of the Traunseebahn was moved to share Gmunden See station, although the standard-gauge passenger service had already ended in 1988, and the standard-gauge line closed completely in 2009.

== Connection to Gmunden Tramway ==
In February 2013, the municipal council of Gmunden decided to link the Traunseebahn to the Gmunden Tramway. This involved moving the terminus in Gmunden to Klosterplatz, to connect with the extended tram line, and replacing the rolling stock on both lines with new low-floor trams.

The new section of the Traunseebahn to Klosterplatz opened on 13 December 2014 and the extension of the tram line began in 2015. The first test trains ran over the new track in August 2018 and the Traunseetram from Gmunden to Vorchdorf began operation on 1 September 2018. The town section of the line (from Gmunden railway station to Engelhof station on the Traunseebahn) is served by four trams per hour on weekdays and two on weekends, with half of these continuing to Vorchdorf.

== Rolling stock ==
The Traunseetram is currently operated by a fleet of Tramlink low-floor trams. Stern & Hafferl ordered eleven of these vehicles, numbered ET 121–131, from Vossloh España (now part of Stadler Rail) in 2013. Eight are used on the Traunseetram and the other three on the Attergaubahn. They are five-section 100% low-floor multi-articulated trams with a capacity of 175 passengers, including 60 seats and 15 folding seats. The first of the vehicles was delivered on 3 December 2015 and they began operation on the Traunseebahn on 12 March 2016.

== Depot ==
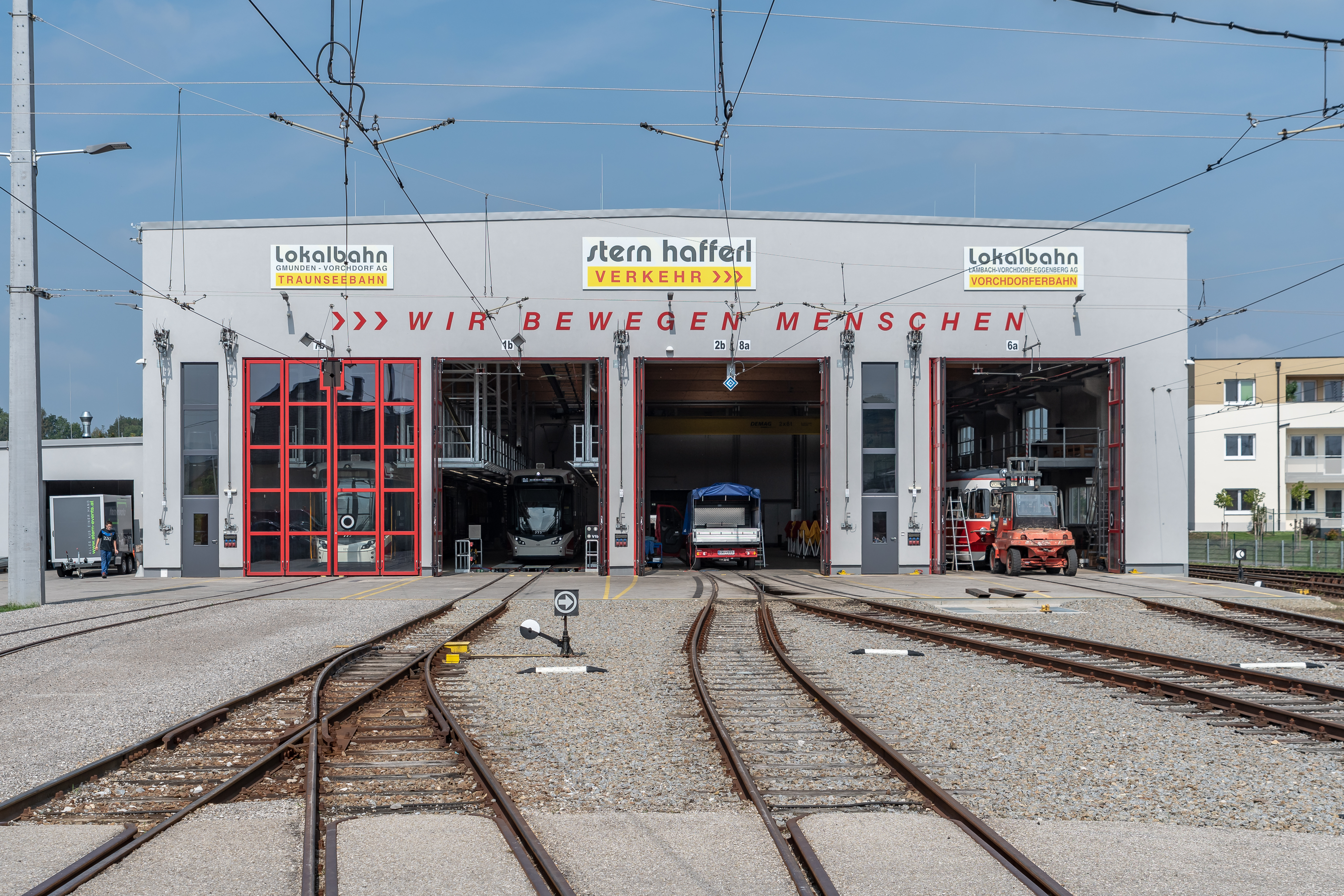
Stern & Hafferl depot in Vorchdorf

The main depot for the railway is in Vorchdorf and is shared with the standard-gauge line to Lambach, also operated by Stern & Hafferl. The depot was rebuilt in 2014 ready for the new low-floor rolling stock. It now has a single 50 m × 30 m (165 ft × 100 ft) hall with four tracks (two metre gauge, one dual gauge and one standard gauge) and can fit three of the Tramlink vehicles inside. Other trams are kept at Engelhof station, which has three tracks inside an 80-metre-long (260 ft) hall.

== See also ==
- Narrow-gauge railways in Austria
