= Trams in Klagenfurt =

Overview of the tram system of Klagenfurt, Austria

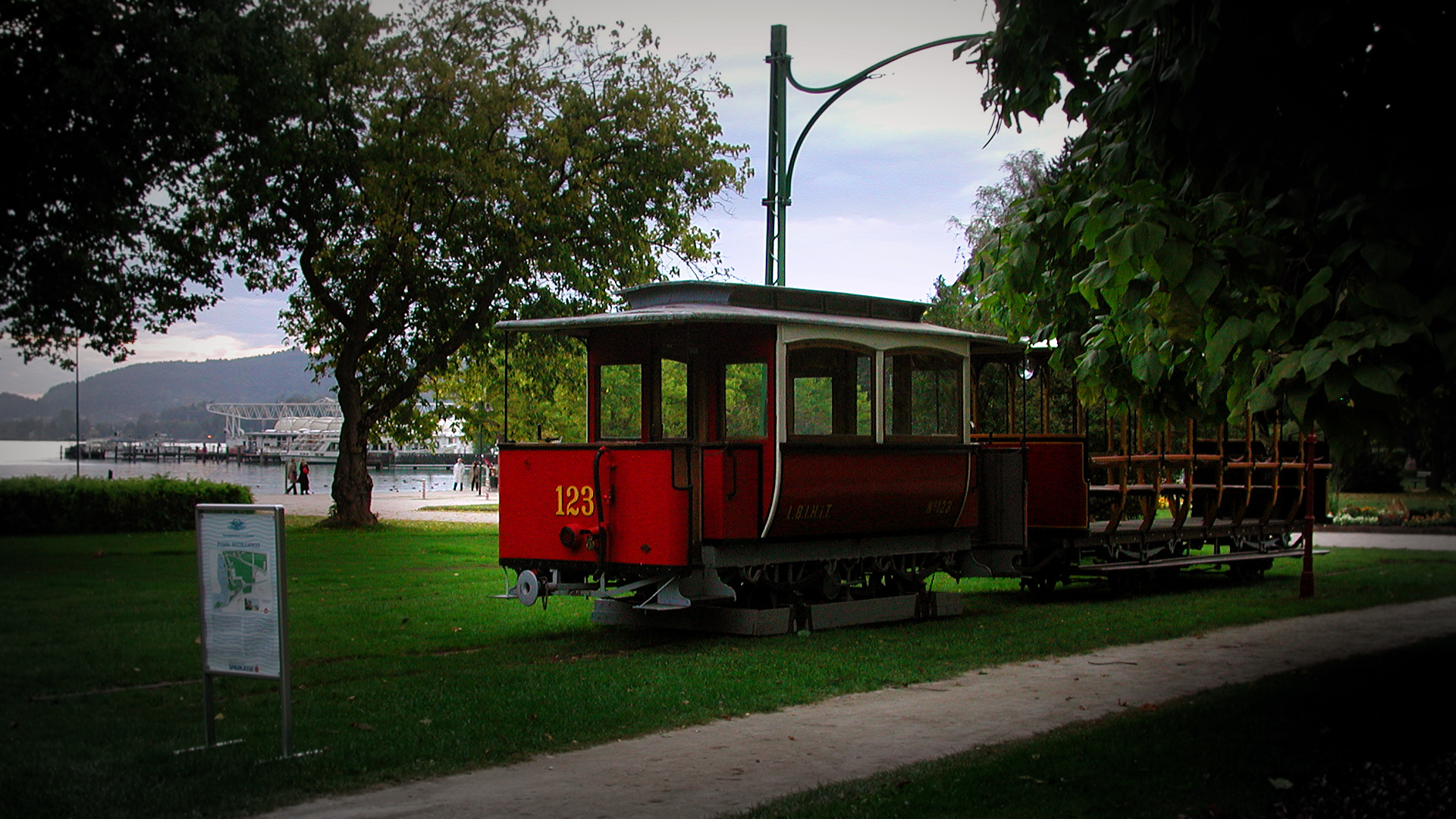
- The proposed site for the new so-called Lake Tramway ("Seetramway") has been marked by an old tram car since 2008

Overview
- Locale: Klagenfurt, Carinthia, Austria
- Transit type: 2 Tram lines
- Number of lines: "Hauptbahnhof"-"See-Strandbad" (5.86 km) "Heiligengeistplatz"-"Zentralfriedhof" (3.44 km)

Operation
- Began operation: 5 July 1891 (horse trams); 6 May 1911 (electric trams)
- Ended operation: 16 April 1963

Technical
- System length: 10.2 km (6.3 mi)
- Track gauge: one-meter
- Electrification: 800 V overhead lines

The Klagenfurt tram network operated in various forms between 1891 and 1963, which was when diesel buses took over, reflecting lower operating costs at a time of relatively low prices for oil based fuels.

In 2005, in response to exceptional levels of particulates pollution in Klagenfurt the city authorities proposed a resumption of tram services. A feasibility study was commissioned, but concluded that the cost of the necessary investment would be prohibitive.

== History ==
By the 1880 the population of Klagenfurt had reached almost 20,000, which was enough to justify fresh public transport investment. Between 1883 and 1885 various companies put forward plans for a tram powered by horses, steam or even electricity. It was not till 15 May 1891, however, that the city awarded its first tram concession. The company set up by the Vienna entrepreneur Adolf Springer was contracted to operate a horse powered tram service, and an experimental operation was almost immediately put in place. The first tram line, using a one-meter gauge, connecting the main station, on the city's south side, with the "Holy Ghost Square" (Heiligengeist Platz) in the city centre was completed on 30 June 1891, and services began on 5 July 1891. The service expanded to the point where it employed a large number of summer tramcars, three winter tramcars and, at busy times, up to 24 horses. Helped by low personnel costs, the operation was cost-effective and popular, especially during the summer months, in a city with an economy that by now was already heavily impacted by a large scale but highly seasonal level of tourist business. Passenger numbers peaked in 1910 at 386,766. 1910 was also the system's final year of horse traction.

In 1910 Siemens, working under a contract agreed with the city the previous year, began work on an electric tram system which was to replace its horse-drawn precursor. The first electric tram service, which connected the main railway station with "Theatre Square" (Theaterplatz) opened on 6 May 1911. Significant further expansion followed later in the same year. In 1935, which coincidentally was the year in which traffic in Klagenfurt switched to driving on the right side of the road, saw a new tram service connecting the Military Swimming School with the city's newly expanded opened bathing beach on the Wörthersee. The total length of tram lines now comprised 10.2 km (slightly more than 6 miles). The open ended "summer tramcars" that had been taken over from the horse-drawn trams in 1911 were still in use, and they were held in great affection so that now a new batch was ordered for the new line, with only very minor technical modifications.

Operational problems nevertheless arose from lack of infrastructure investment which meant that right up to the end most of the Klagenfurt tram system operated on a single track network. In 1944 irreparable bomb damage at the Kreuzbergl caused the a section of tramline to be replaced with a trolleybus service. From 1948 the tram routes were also being operated by diesel buses, and on 6 May 1954 the city council passed a resolution to abandon the tram system. The line to the lakeshore was closed the same year. There followed a further period of uncertainty before the stretch to Annabichl was also closed, in 1961. The step-by-step switch to buses was completed on 16 April 1963, when the one-and-a-half kilometer long tram service connecting the station to "Holy Ghost Square" (Heiligengeist Platz) was withdrawn. 16 April 1963 also marked the ending of trolleybus services in the city.

== Conservation projects ==
Even before the closure of the city's trams in 1963, there were plans for conserving the tramcars. In 1969 the precursor organisation to the "Carinthia Museum railway" was founded. One of its most important priorities involved the Klagenfurt trams. By 1975 a collection of 40 European tramcars - not all of them from Klagenfurt - representing various epochs had been assembled. In 1976 a 750-meter tram line was opened in Klagenfurt's Europapark. Known as the "Lendcanaltramway", the line has four tram halts and is operated during summer months by electric (or more rarely horse drawn) trams. Plans to extend the line have existed for a long time, but have been deferred for a succession of reasons, including planning hurdles resulting from the park's status as a nature conservation zone and, in contrast, the planning process for a convention centre, which was eventually built and is today known as the Lindner Seepark Hotel.

On 27 January 2009 the city council gave unanimous support for a tourist tram service linking the bathing beach with the model village, and they gave the project the name Lake Tramway ("Seetramway"). They stopped short of deciding how to finance the project, however. Discussions have continued around issues of cost and funding, but (in 2015) it is still not anticipated that funding will be forthcoming in the foreseeable future.

== Discussions of a return for the city tram ==
In 2005, in response to exceptional levels of particulates pollution in Klagenfurt the city authorities proposed a resumption of tram services. A feasibility study was commissioned from the Innsbruck Institute for Transport and space planning. The study, which cost €30,000, concluded that it would not be sensible to incur capital of between 12 and 20 million Euro for reintroducing trams to Klagenfurt city streets to provide a system that might be used by perhaps 12,500 people per day. An additional considerable involved longer term future plans by regional government to close a stretch of railway line alongside the lake shore and use some of the land freed up to create an underground rail bypass route in a way that could not be easily combined with a new city tramline. Again, the relatively small number of users anticipated for any new tram line made the cost of any workaround solution unacceptably costly.
