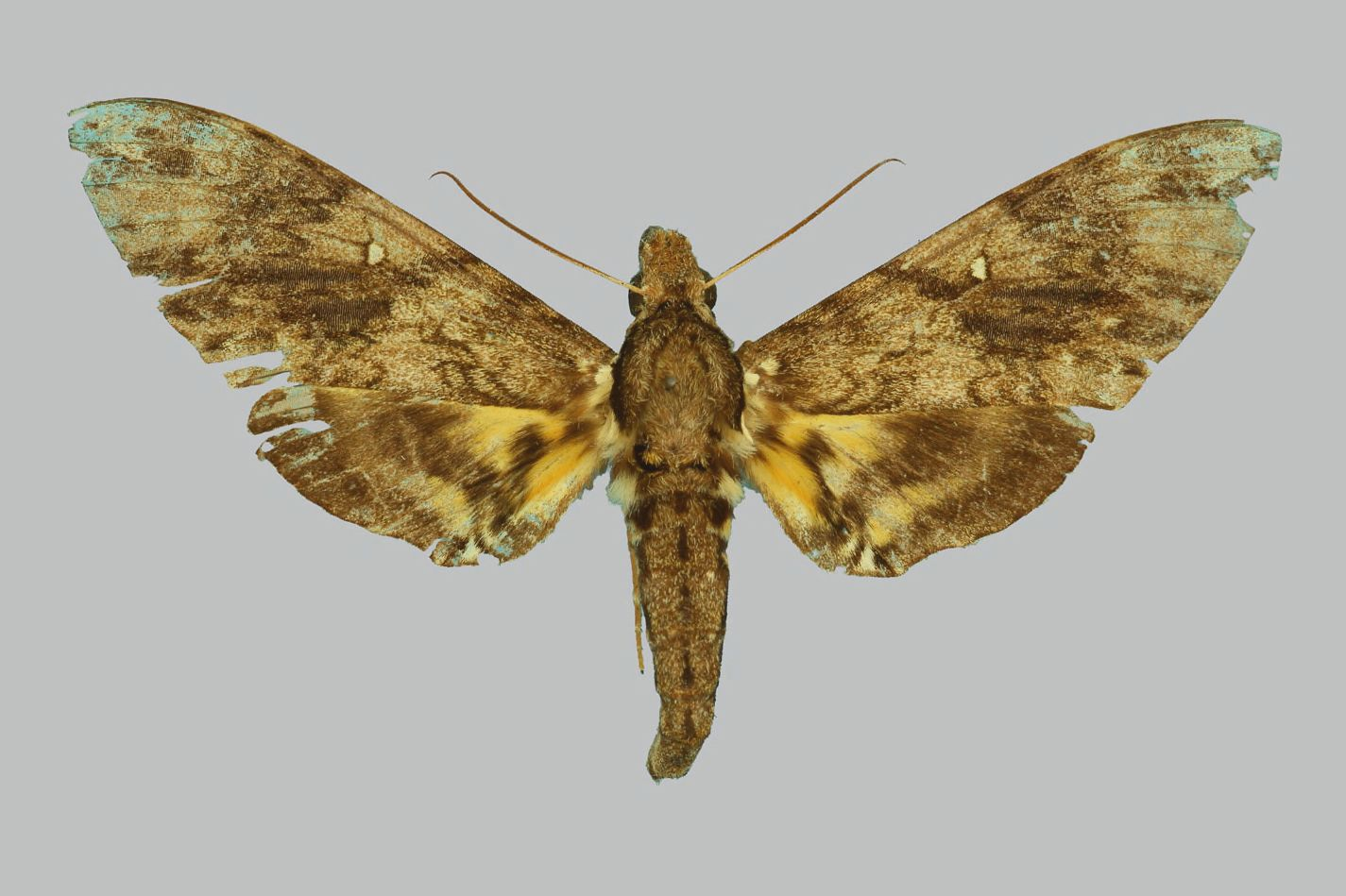

Scientific classification
- Domain: Eukaryota
- Kingdom: Animalia
- Phylum: Arthropoda
- Class: Insecta
- Order: Lepidoptera
- Family: Sphingidae
- Genus: Panogena
- Species: P. lingens

Binomial name
- Panogena lingens (Butler, 1877)

Synonyms
- Protoparce lingens Butler, 1877

= Panogena lingens =

Species of moth

Panogena lingens is a moth of the family Sphingidae. It is known from Madagascar and the Comoro Islands.

== Subspecies ==
- Panogena lingens lingens (Madagascar)
- Panogena lingens comorana Griveaud, 1960 (Comoro Islands)
