= Mödling and Hinterbrühl Tram =

Electric tramway in Austria

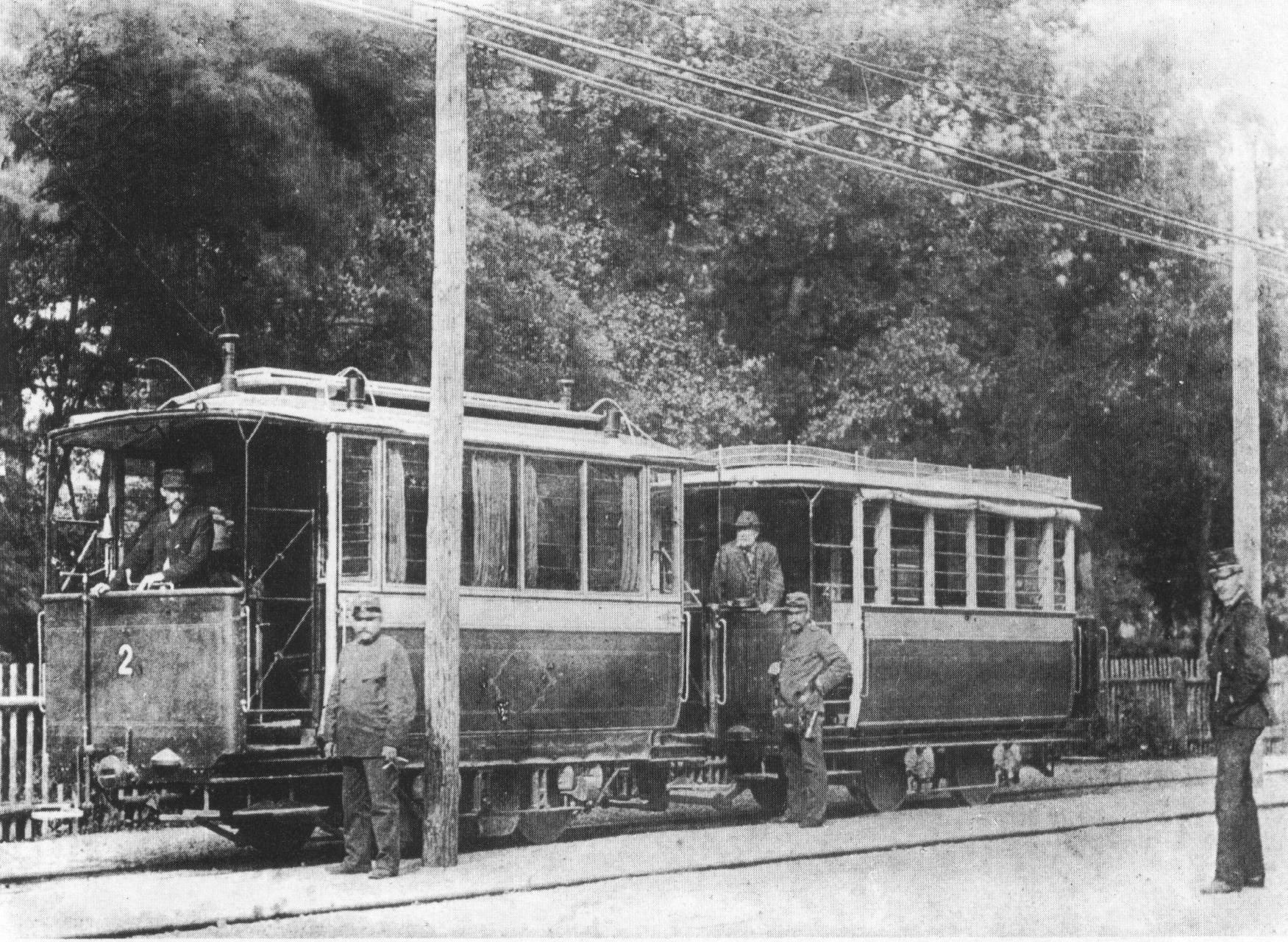
First type of Mödling and Hinterbrühl tramcars, bipolar overhead line

Mödling and Hinterbrühl Tram or Mödling and Hinterbrühl Local Railway (German: Lokalbahn Mödling–Hinterbrühl) was an electric tramway in Austria, running 4.5 km (2.8 mi) from Mödling to Hinterbrühl, in the southwest of Vienna. The gauge was 1,000 mm (3 ft 3 3/8 in) metre gauge. Opened in October 1883, it was the first tram and railway in the world that was run with electricity delivered by an overhead line in permanent service. It was the first electric tram and railway in Austria, and it was the second one installed for definitive service. The operation ceased in March 1932.

The approval had been granted by the k.k. Ministry of Commerce in 1882. The tram was built and run by the Südbahngesellschaft (the private Austrian Southern Railway Company) that operated the main line from Vienna to Trieste, including the standard gauge railway station at Mödling.

Electric traction operating at 550 volts DC was chosen. As for lack of space, parts of the trackway had to be laid on public roads. The metre gauge single track rail of the tram had several turnouts. The overhead line was bipolar and consisted of two downwards open tubes, in which the two pantographs hang like aerial trams. This technique had been introduced by Ernst Werner von Siemens in his experimental Electromote trolleybus concept. After a test on October 18, 1883, the regular service in the first section between Mödling and Vorderbrühl Valley started on October 22, 1883. As a condition for permitting the traffic through the narrow part of the valley in 1884, the authorities ordered the availability of a steam engine as emergency traction. In 1885, the line was completed to Hinterbrühl.

In 1903, the line was modernized and the bipolar overhead line was replaced by a unipolar wire. The new contact supplies were bow collectors. Since 1912, the revenues exceeded the expenses.

In 1927 a bus service was installed in the valley. The competition became precarious for both. In 1923, the Austrian Ministry for Trade and Traffic decided that the tramline had to be closed down. The last tram on the line ran on March 31, 1932.

== See also ==
- List of town tramway systems in Europe

== Bibliography ==
- Hohn, Manfred; Stanfel, Dieter; Figlhuber, Hellmuth R. (1983). Mödling–Hinterbrühl. Die erste elektrische Bahn Europas für Dauerbetrieb. Wien: Verlag Slezak. ISBN 978-3-85416-079-3.
- 100 Jahre elektrische Bahn Mödling - Hinterbrühl. Festschrift. Mödling: Medilihha, Schriftenreihe des Bezirks-Museums-Vereines Mödling. 2. Aufl., Bezirks-Museums-Verein. 1983.
- Kaiser, Wolfgang (2004). Straßenbahnen in Österreich. München: GeraMond Verlag. ISBN 978-3-7654-7198-8.
