= Florianerbahn =

Coordinates: 48°14′0″N 14°22′28″E

Ebelsberg–St. Florian tramway
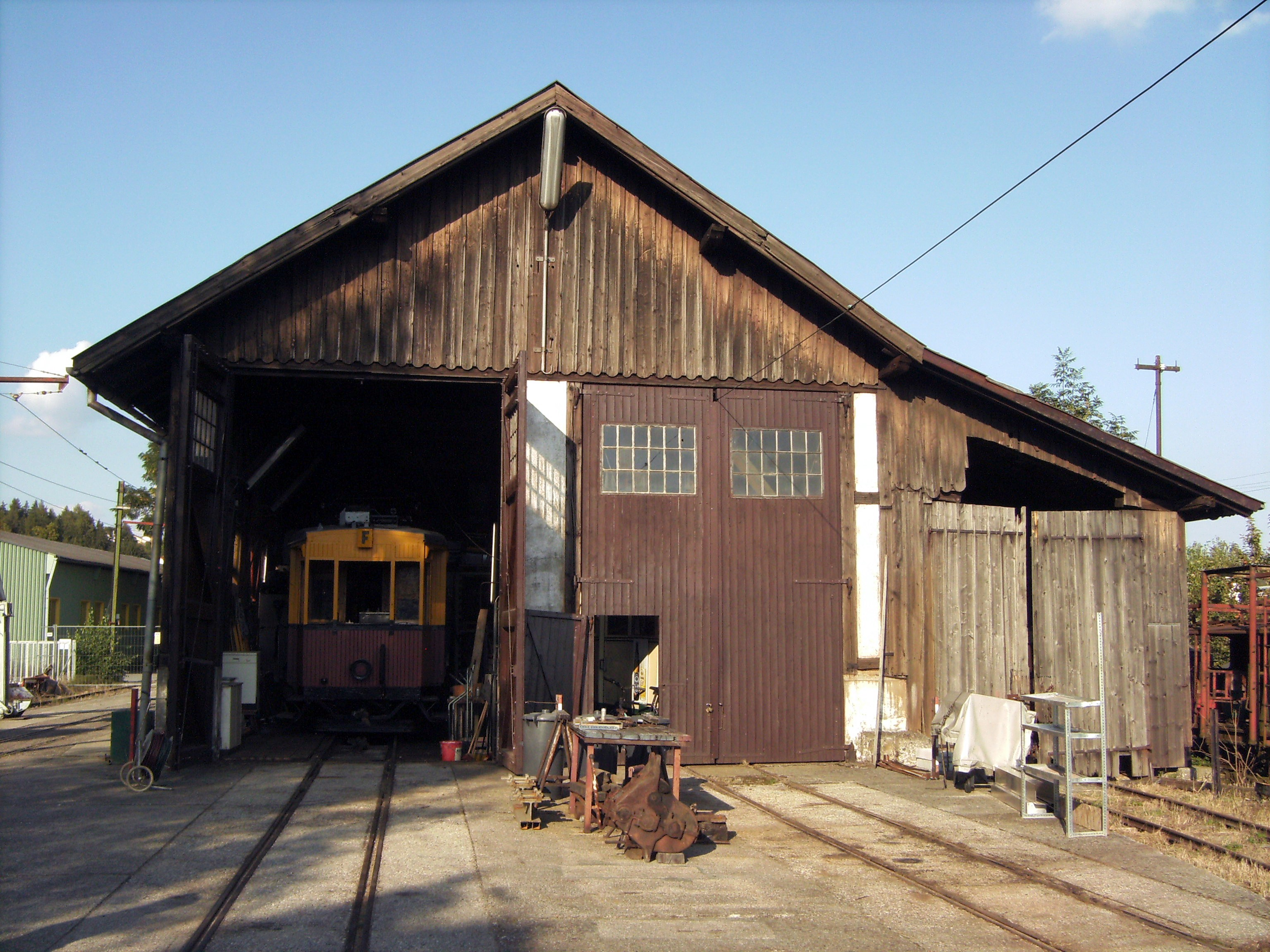
- Florianerbahn depot

Technical
- Line length: 9.6 km (6 mi)
- Track gauge: 900 mm (2 ft 11 7/16 in)
- Electrification: 600 V DC

The Florianerbahn is a museum tramway in Upper Austria that is not operational due to construction work. It was built as a railway - a licensed narrow gauge Lokalbahn or branch line - between the independent commununity of Ebelsberg (today a district within Linz) and Sankt Florian. It was owned by the Lokalbahn Ebelsberg–St. Florian AG, but operated by the firm of Stern & Hafferl from Gmunden. Because the line had the character of a tramway (Überlandstraßenbahn) it switched over to providing tramway services in the wake of the annexation of Austria in 1938 – along with Stern & Hafferl's sister companies Elektrische Lokalbahn Unterach–See and Elektrische Lokalbahn Gmunden.

The rail gauge is the same as that of the Linz tramway, 900 mm (2 ft 11 7/16 in), the line is electrified, operating at 600 V C. It ran regular services from 2 September 1913 to the end of 1973. From 1929 it was connected directly to the Linz tramway network at Ebelsberg, so that trailer coaches could run through from Linz to St. Florian.

The line was officially opened on 1 September 1913. The specially decorated first train, consisting of a railcar and two carriages, left Sankt Florian at 6:22 and arrived at Ebelsberg at 6:50. 42 of the 96 places available were taken.

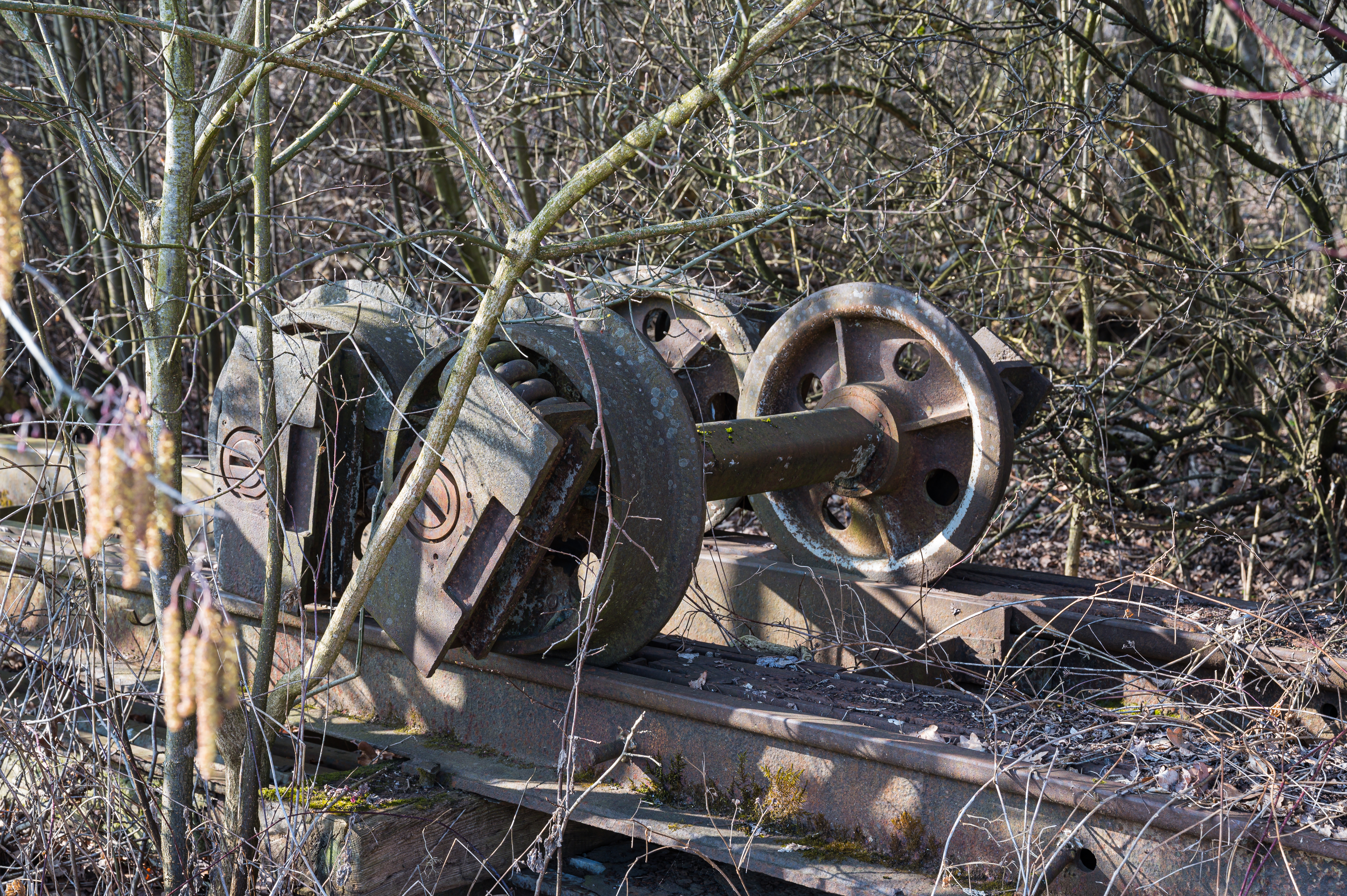
Remnants of the tracks in St. Florian

After the fall in passenger numbers and the cessation of services on 31 December 1973 the line was taken over by the Austrian Society for Railway History (ÖGEG), and later by the Club Florianerbahn society and a section of the line reactivated as a museum railway. As of 2008 there were no museum services because much of the route is not usable: between Pichling and Bruck the line runs under the Western motorway and had to be lifted whilst construction work is going on. The track has since been replaced, but the catenary is still missing. Between Pichling and Ebelsberg a large section of the overgrown tracks has been removed to build a ring road and has not been fully replaced. The museum's vehicle collection in St. Florian can be visited if notice is given.

== Vehicles ==
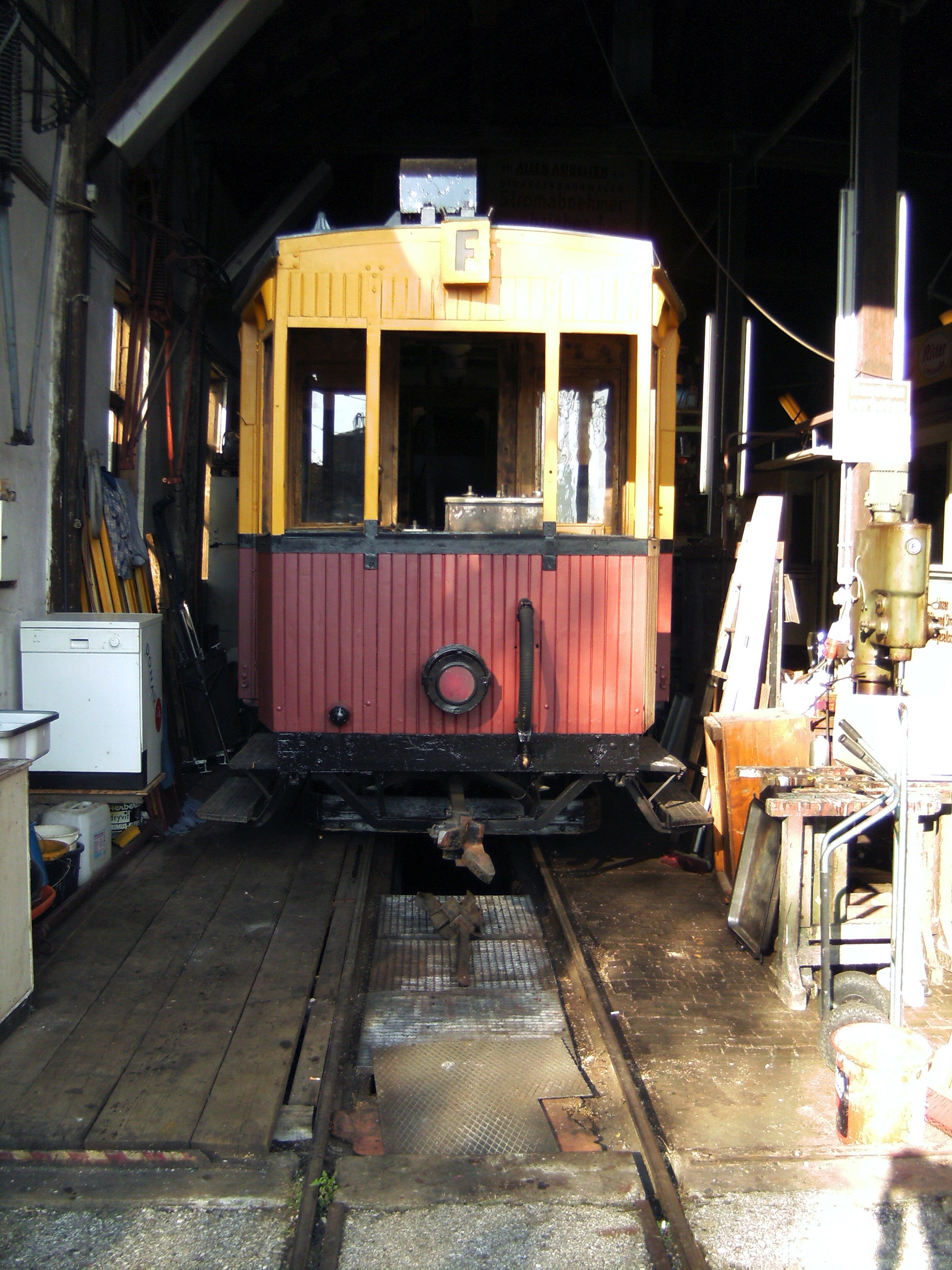
EM 1 in the shed

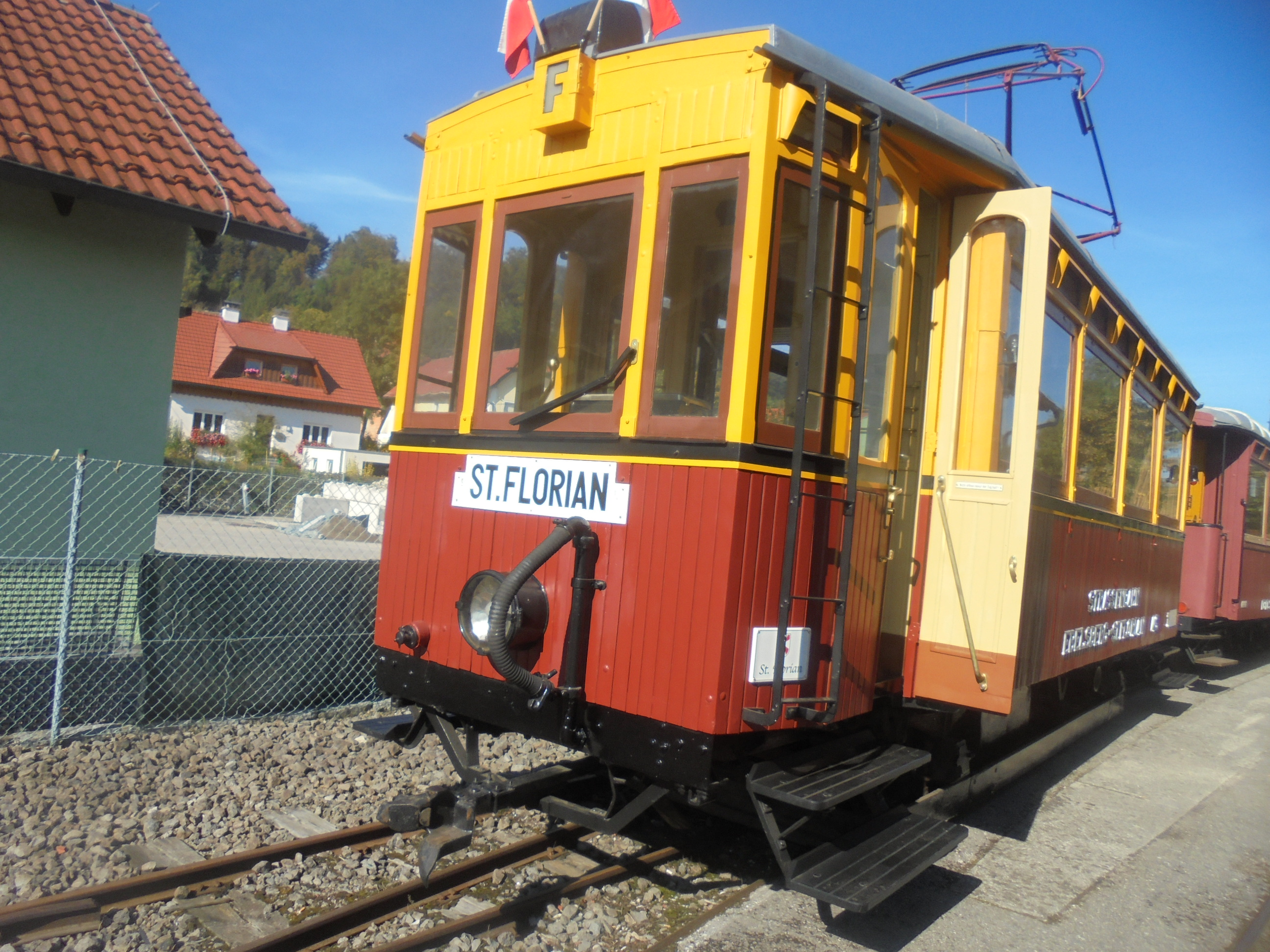
EM 1 on the track

The line was worked by the following vehicles until it closed in 1973:

| Number | Year of manufacture | Manufacturer | Remarks |
|---|---|---|---|
| Railbuses | | | |
| EM 1 | 1912 | Grazer Waggonfabrik | retired in 1974, transferred to the museum railway in 1975 |
| EM 2 | 1912 | Grazer Waggonfabrik | scrapped in 1975 |
| EM 3 | 1912 | Grazer Waggonfabrik | retired in 1974, transferred to the museum railway in 1975 |
| Trailer coach | | | |
| EP 1 | 1912 | Grazer Waggonfabrik | renumbered to EB 20.224 in 1974 |
| EP 2 | 1912 | Grazer Waggonfabrik | renumbered to EB 20.222 in 1974 |
| EP 3 | 1912 | Grazer Waggonfabrik | renumbered to EB 20.223 in 1974 |
| EP 4 | 1913 | Grazer Waggonfabrik | Gep 4 to 1951, transferred to the museum railway in 1975 |
| EP 5 | 1913 | Grazer Waggonfabrik | Gep 5 to 1940, transferred to the museum railway in 1975 |
| good wagon | | | |
| E 501 | 1912 | Grazer Waggonfabrik | scrapped in 1974 |
| E 502 | 1946 | Stabeg | scrapped in 1974 |
| E 521 | 1912 | Grazer Waggonfabrik | scrapped in 1974 |

The abbreviations had the following meaning:

- EM – Ebelsberg Motorwagen (power car)
- EP – Ebelsberg Personenwagen (coach)

These designations were not written on the vehicles themselves.

== Sources ==
- Helmut Weis: Die Unternehmung Stern & Hafferl III. Bahn im Bild, Band 80, 1991
- Wolfgang Kaiser: Straßenbahnen in Österreich. GeraMond Verlag, 2004 ISBN 3-7654-7198-4
