= Hinterbrühl =

- Municipality
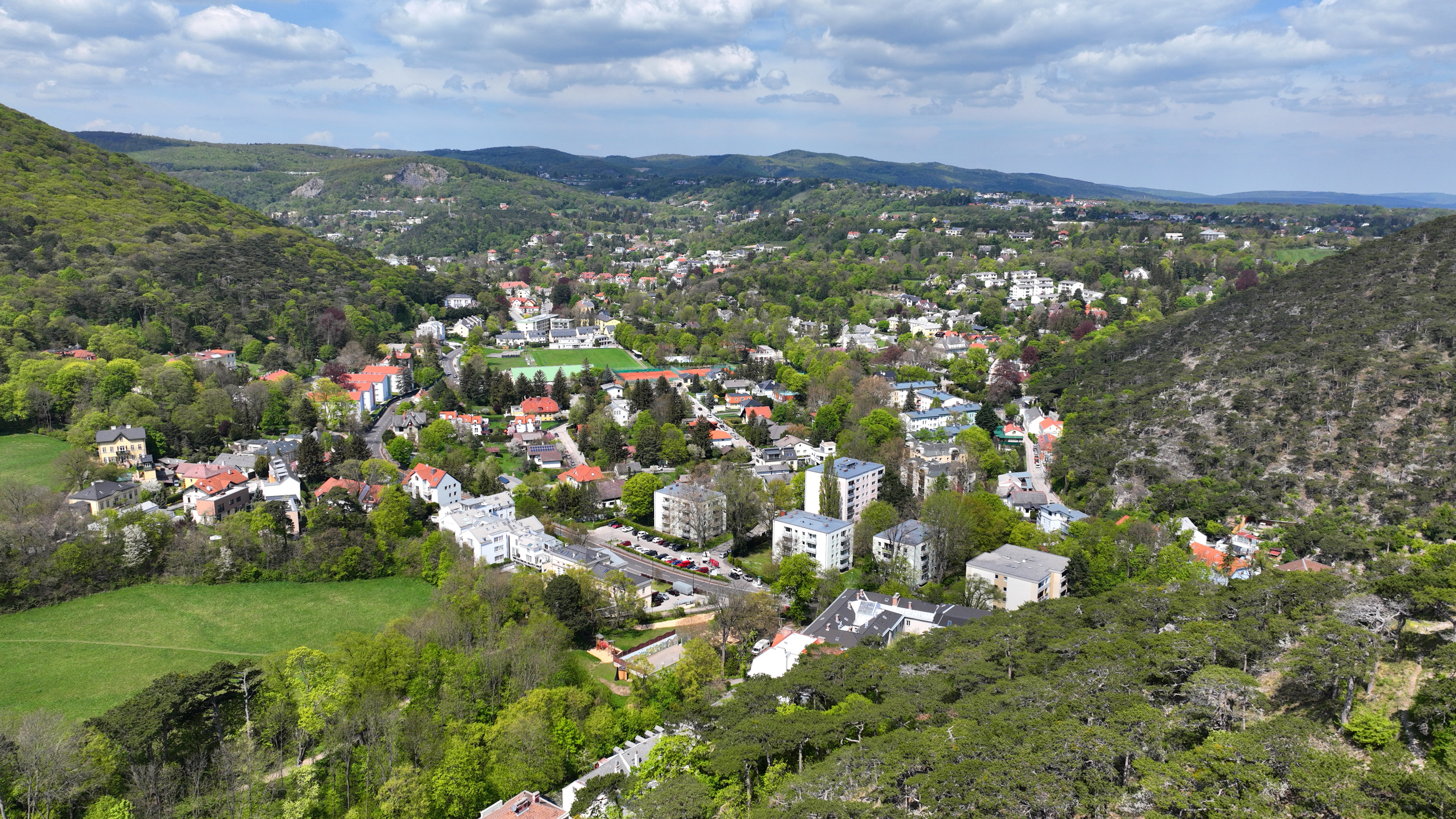
- Southeast view of Hinterbrühl

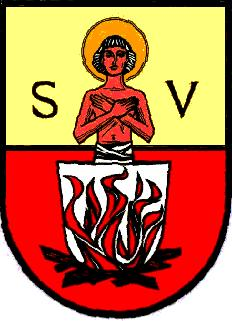
- Coat of arms

- Location within Austria
- Coordinates: 48°5′N 16°14′E
- Country: Austria
- State: Lower Austria
- District: Mödling

Government
  - Mayor: Erich Moser (ÖVP)

Area
  - Total: 16.94 km^{2} (6.54 sq mi)
- Elevation: 280 m (920 ft)

Population (2018-01-01)
  - Total: 4,029
  - Density: 237.8/km^{2} (616.0/sq mi)
- Time zone: UTC+1 (CET)
  - Summer (DST): UTC+2 (CEST)
- Postal code: 2371, 2393
- Area code: 02236, 02237
- Website: www.hinterbruehl.com

Hinterbrühl (German pronunciation: [ˈhintɐˌbʁyːl]) is a town in the district of Mödling in the Austrian state of Lower Austria. It is home to the Seegrotte, a system of caves including Europe's largest underground lake. During World War II, a satellite camp of Mauthausen concentration camp was opened inside the caverns, producing parts for the He 162 Spatz jet fighter.

== History ==
Hinterbrühl was settled as early as 6,000 years ago.

Like neighboring areas, Hinterbrühl suffered mightily under the two Turkish sieges of 1529 and 1683. Since a majority of the population was killed, the area was inhabited by settlers who moved north from Styria after 1683.

From 1883 to March 31, 1932, Mödling and Hinterbrühl Tram, the first electric streetcar in continental Europe, linked Hinterbrühl to Mödling railway station. Today, only the Bahnplatz remains of this historic achievement.

On August 4, 1943, a satellite camp of Mauthausen concentration camp was built in the city. The prisoners there built parts, sub-assemblies and BMW 003 turbojet engines for the He 162 Spatz (sparrow) jet fighter in a hastily converted underground factory during late autumn and spring 1945. The 162, created for the Emergency Fighter Program and the winner of the Volksjäger ("People's Fighter") aviation design competition, was an extremely lightweight, cheap and fast plane that could be discarded if it suffered any damage. Hinterbrühl was just part of a vast crash production program where dozens of factories of varying sizes would make parts for the jet, then send them to sites like Hinterbrühl for final assembly and transshipment to flight test centers — or even directly to airbases, such was the desperate last-minute nature of the enterprise.

In the last days of the war in 1945, the inmates of other camps had to make a 200 km-long march to the concentration camp Mauthausen in Hinterbrühl. Virtually none of them survived. Fifty-one inmates were killed, even before the march, by gasoline injections or strangled by SS-officers. In 1988 a monument was erected above the Subterranean Lake to honor the 51 victims of this massacre.

From 1964, the SOS Children's Villages in Hinterbrühl was led by Austrian pediatrician Hans Asperger.

== Population ==
Historical population
Year	Pop.	±%
1869	1,231	—
1880	1,417	+15.1%
1890	1,708	+20.5%
1900	2,055	+20.3%
1910	2,408	+17.2%
1923	2,294	−4.7%
1934	2,462	+7.3%
1939	3,283	+33.3%
1951	3,228	−1.7%
1961	3,230	+0.1%
1971	3,677	+13.8%
1981	3,989	+8.5%
1991	4,150	+4.0%
2001	4,020	−3.1%
2011	4,068	+1.2%

== Seegrotte ==
The Hinterbrühl Seegrotte (Lake Grotto) is a large underground lake located in Hinterbrühl. This grotto is an important historic site. It used to be open to the public for tours. The grotto is actually an old gypsum mine. By the end of 1800 it was used to make red and white plaster. In 1912 a blast released millions of gallons of water and flooded the lower caverns of the mine, creating the largest underground lake in Europe. In the 1930s a team of cave explorers found the lake and finally managed to open the grotto for the public. The upper (non-flooded) tunnels of the same old mine were reused by Nazi German authorities as an aircraft-manufacturing facility which used forced labor.

== Höldrichsmühle ==
Höldrichsmühle, an old mill, is a hotel in Hinterbrühl that was featured on the 24g Austrian definitive stamp of 1945 (SG936). Höldrichsmühle was a regular subject for postcards from the late 1890s onwards. Many of these cards claim an association with the composer Franz Schubert, and there have been various plaques and internal features in support of these claims. Early postcards claim that Schubert wrote Die schöne Müllerin here, later cards claim that it was Der Lindenbaum (from Winterreise). There is no documentary evidence to support these claims, though there is a claim in Deutsch's Schubert: Memoirs by his friends made by Hermann Rollett in 1897 that he had seen Franz Schubert at Höldrichsmühle around 1825 or 1826, when Rollett was aged seven.

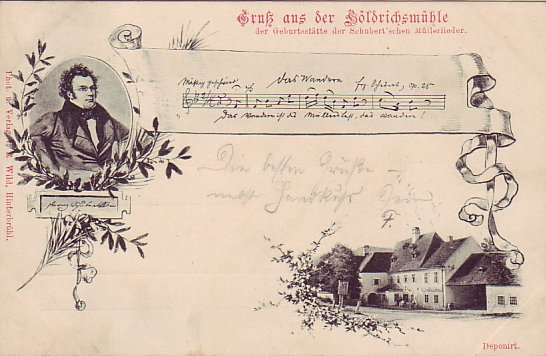
Postcard showing the Höldrichsmühle inn in Hinterbrühl, Lower Austria. The card shows a portrait of the composer Franz Schubert, together with an incipit of Das Wandern, the first song in Schubert's Die schöne Müllerin song cycle. There appears to be no documentary evidence to back up this claim, though there is evidence that Schubert wrote Die schöne Müllerin in hospital in Vienna.

== Notable people ==
- Karl Motesiczky
