= Leithen Valley =

Valley in Austria

Coordinates: 48.3731°N 13.7819°E

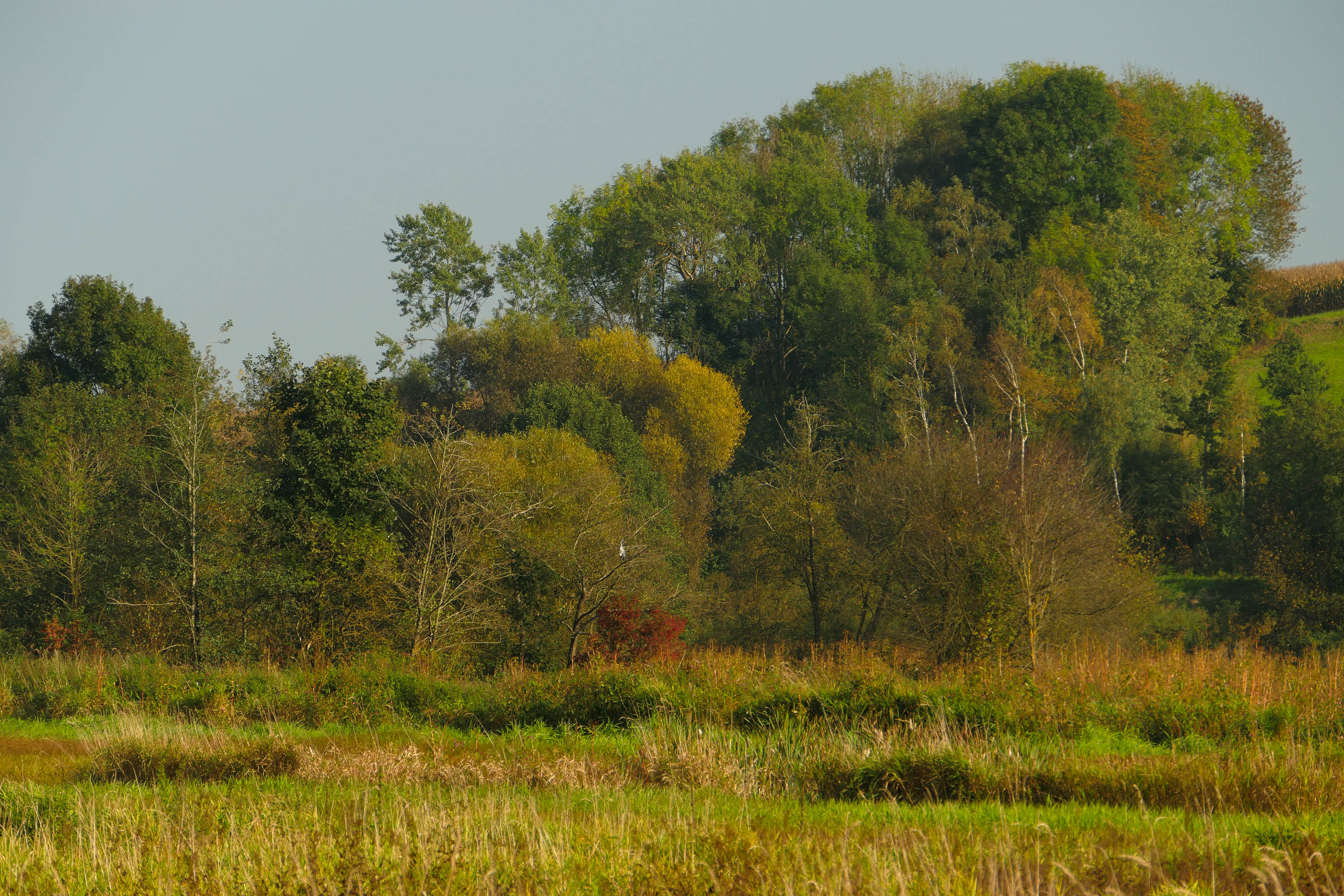
Koaserin Nature Reserve at the end of the valley

Leithen Valley, also called Valley of the Seven Mills, is a valley of about two kilometres length at the border of Peuerbach and Neukirchen am Walde in Upper-Austria that is very popular among hikers due to its beautiful landscape and the proximity to Koaserin Nature Reserve. Up to the second halfe of the 20th century it was characterised by its remarkable concentration of watermills, sawmills and other craft enterprises.

The valley extends from Stroiss Mill in the west to Furthner Mill in the east. Latter was first officially mentioned in 1371. The tradition of electricity generation, that exists in Leithen Valley since 1902 is continued after the termination of the mills as well as the production of agricultural machines by the Puehringer Company, that has its roots in a smithy first mentioned in 1649, and counts to the oldest enterprises in Grieskirchen District.

== Mills in the valley ==
- Stroiss Mill (former Steinwehr Mill)
- Mitter Mill
- Ehlinger Mill
- Kupferhamer Mill
- Reischl Mill
- Achleithner Mill
- Furthner Mill
