= Linzer Lokalbahn =

Railway network in Upper Austria, Austria

Linzer Lokalbahn: Stations and works of art
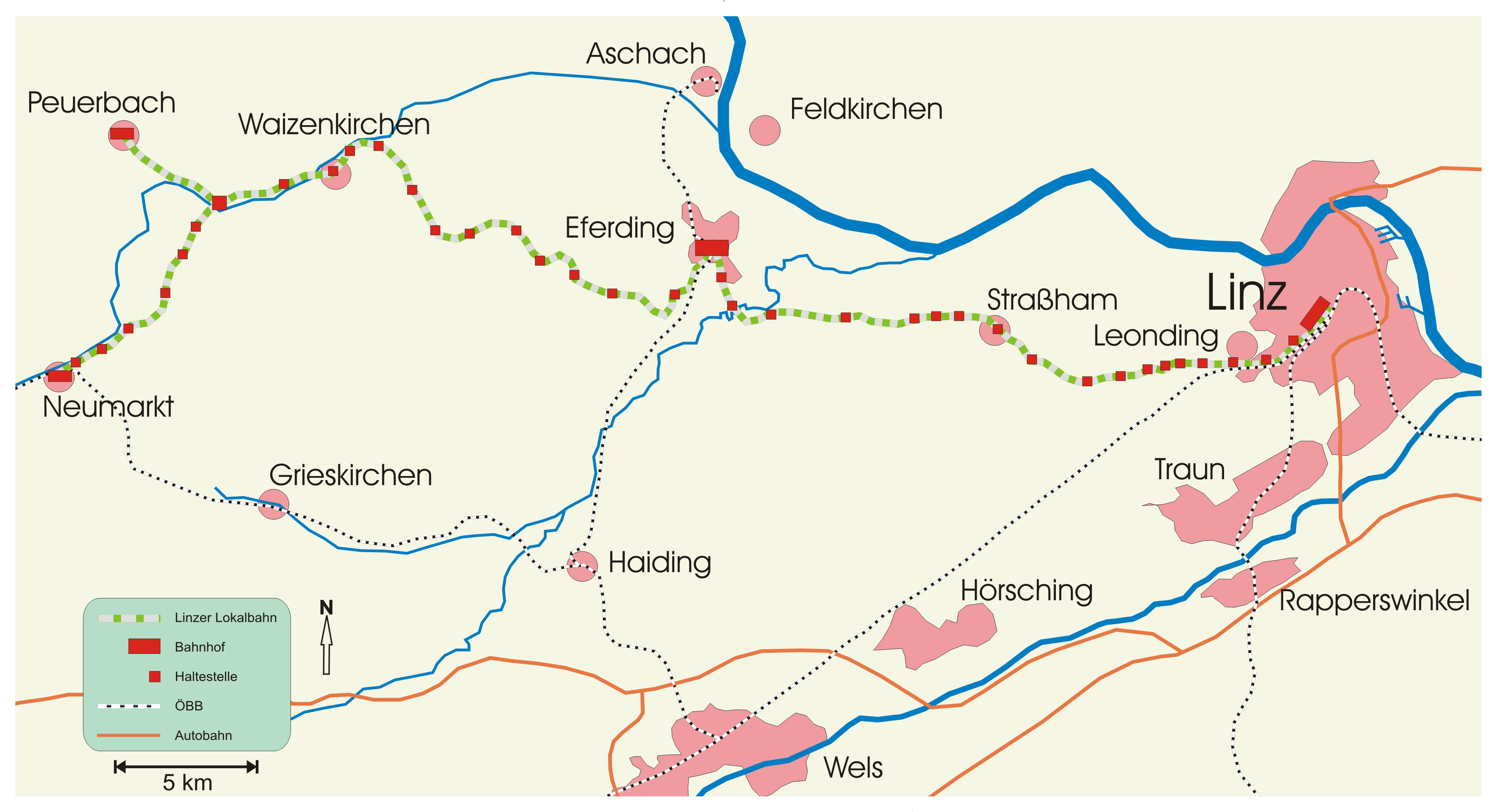
- Linz–Gaisbach-Wartberg railway line from České Budějovice

Technical
- Line length: 58,893 km (36,594 mi)
- Track length: 1,435 mi (2,309 km)
- Minimum radius: 80/150 m (1.7 ft)
- Electrification: 750 V

Logo of the Linzer Lokalbahn

The Linzer Lokalbahn (LILO) is a network of three standard-gauge, single-track railway lines in Upper Austria. It originally consisted only of the line opened in 1912 from the provincial capital Linz via the district town of Eferding to Waizenkirchen. In 1998 the existing line from Neumarkt-Kallham (on the Wels–Passau railway) to Waizenkirchen, together with its branch to Peuerbach, was incorporated into the Linzer Lokalbahn. With approximately 1.6 million passengers per year (2011 figures), the Linzer Lokalbahn is the most important of the railways operated by Stern & Hafferl. It serves the agriculturally and touristically significant area west of the city of Linz on the Danube.

Since 11 December 2016 the section Linz–Eferding has been served by line S5 of the S-Bahn Upper Austria.

== History ==
=== Origins ===
One of the earliest railway projects after the construction of Upper Austria's main lines aimed to connect the regions of Eferding, Aschach an der Donau, Waizenkirchen and Peuerbach with the provincial capital Linz. As early as the 1880s there were efforts to build such a local railway. After the opening of the Western Railway, planning quickly began for additional local railways radiating from Wels. The line from Wels via Haiding to Aschach an der Donau was completed on 20 August 1886. Operation of this railway was entrusted to the Gmunden-based firm Stern & Hafferl. This local railway branched from the state railway to Passau at Haiding station and connected the fertile Eferdinger Becken and the Aschach region with the Austrian state railway network and the town of Wels.

Because this local railway already existed and because of disagreements between Wels and Linz, the project could not be realised for many years. An action committee was therefore formed under the chairmanship of imperial councillor Mathias Poche. Twenty-four other prominent figures, including the mayor of Linz and the deputy governor of Upper Austria, joined the committee, which set itself the task of establishing a rail link between Linz and Eferding. An extension to Waizenkirchen and possibly as far as Neumarkt-Kallham, with a branch to Peuerbach, was also considered.

After fierce opposition from the town of Wels, the committee presented an alternative plan: a local railway branching at Eferding, running in one direction via Haiding (near Aschach) to Aschach an der Donau and in the other via Waizenkirchen to Peuerbach. No objections were raised to this proposal. On 6 and 7 July 1900 the route inspection and station committee met to discuss the project. Although representatives of Wels and Linz supported it, the plan foundered on the veto of the Welser Lokalbahngesellschaft. Representatives of Waizenkirchen then decided to pursue an independent line from Waizenkirchen to Neumarkt-Kallham parallel to the Wels–Passau state railway, with a branch to Peuerbach. Another committee was formed to develop the project. As no objections were raised, the authorities granted a concession on 13 October 1907 for the "construction and operation of a standard-gauge local railway to be operated by electric power from the state railway station Neumarkt-Kallham to Waizenkirchen, with a branch to Peuerbach".

=== Neumarkt–Waizenkirchen–Peuerbach local railway ===
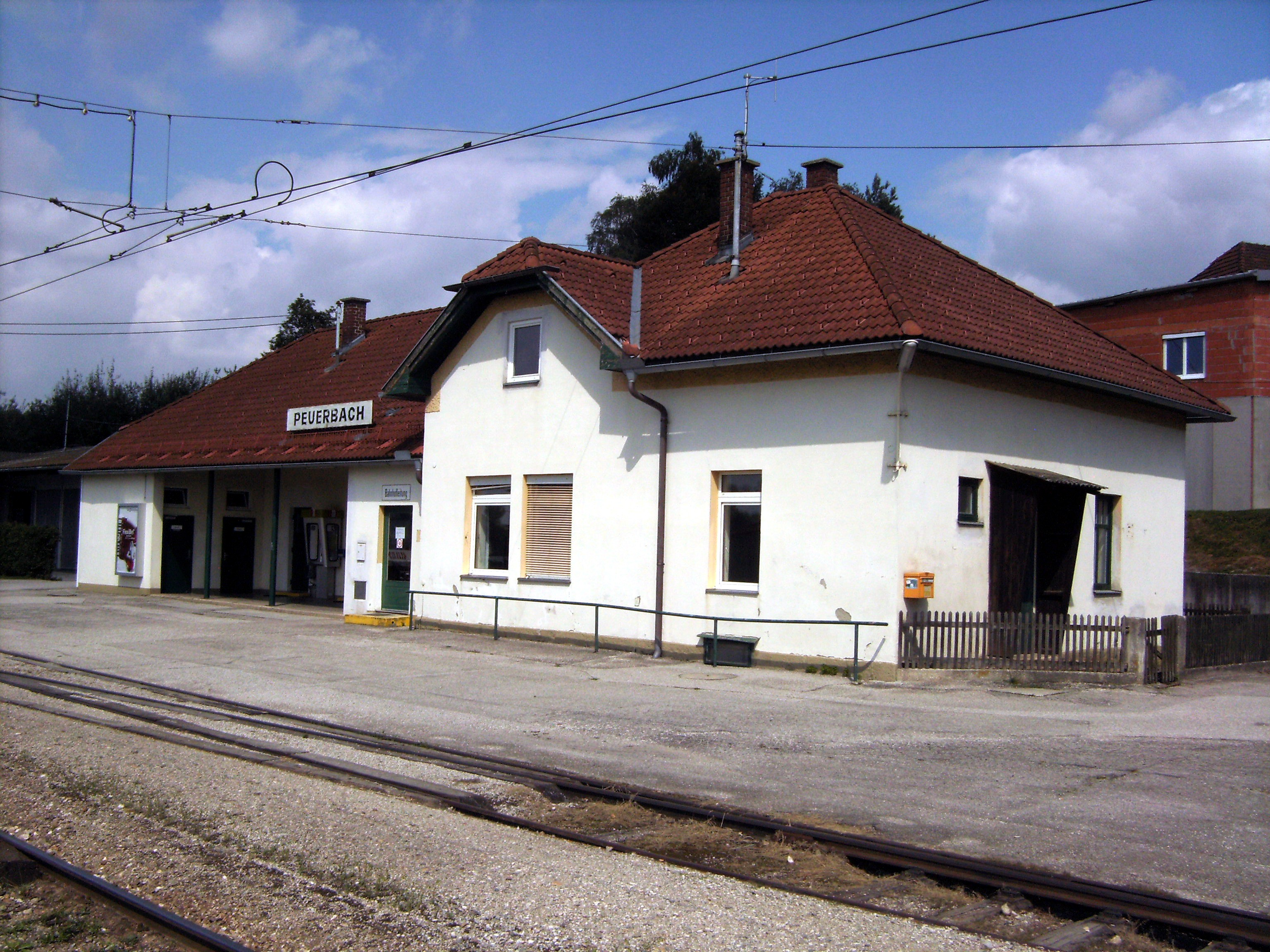
Peuerbach station, largely in its original external condition (2008). The building was later demolished and replaced.

This concession led in the same year to the founding of the Neumarkt–Waizenkirchen–Peuerbach AG. Construction began in May 1908. Stern & Hafferl handled planning and construction supervision and erected station buildings at Waizenkirchen, Peuerbach and Niederspaching. Vehicle sheds were built at Niederspaching and Peuerbach, and a substation at Niederspaching provided the power supply. All electrical equipment was supplied by AEG-Union, and the rolling stock for opening came from the Grazer Waggonfabrik. After several months of construction, the line opened on 18 December 1908.

In 1919 an extension from Peuerbach to Neukirchen am Walde and Engelhartszell was planned. A Mr Fuchsing from Schärding formed an action committee, and a meeting with around 300 participants took place on 24 February 1927. The necessary funding could not be raised, and the project was abandoned.

=== Linz–Eferding–Waizenkirchen local railway ===
In 1907 the original action committee reconvened. Engineer Josef Stern persuaded the committee to adopt electric traction instead of the originally planned steam operation and offered to prepare a detailed project at his own risk and expense. After review by the k.k. Staatsbahn directorate in Linz, the project received funding of 3.5 million kronen (approximately €9.5 million in today's money). Stern's proposals were accepted at a meeting on 4 May 1909, and a financing plan was drawn up that would allow the railway to operate without state subsidies. Financing was to consist of a 1.2 million kronen in bonds, 200,000 kronen in ordinary shares and 2.1 million kronen in preference shares. Following a municipal council resolution on 17 November 1909, the city of Linz purchased preference shares worth 1.5 million kronen. Further shares were taken by neighbouring municipalities and the Allgemeine Sparkasse Linz; the provincial diet supported the project with 200,000 kronen in ordinary shares.

Stern & Hafferl agreed to construct the line and operate it for twelve years at a rate of 50 heller per train-kilometre. With all conditions met, the k.k. Railway Ministry was able to grant the concession.

Political route inspections took place from 6–17 October and 9–15 December 1908. Two years later the ministry ordered concession negotiations.

==== Construction and opening ====
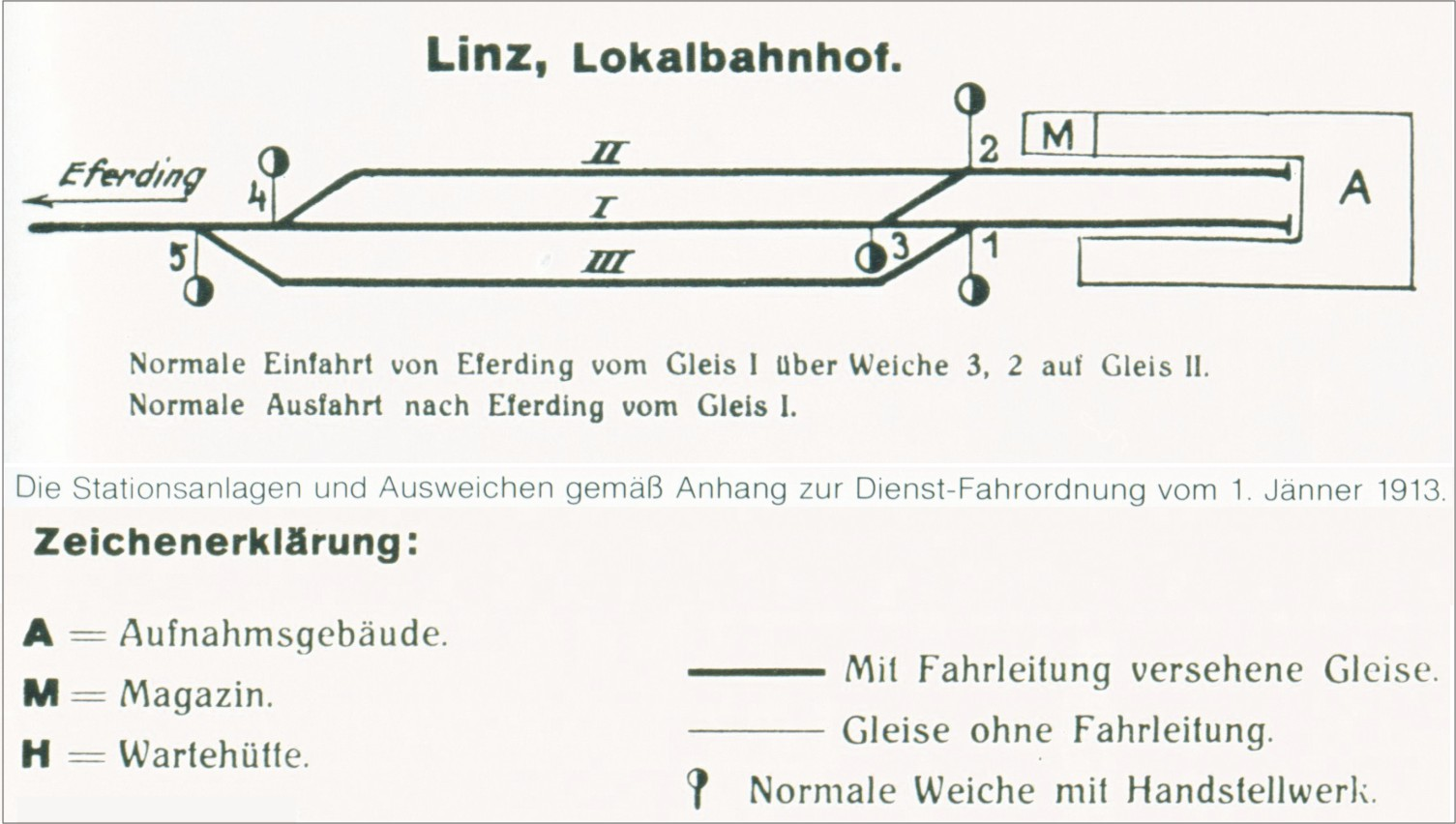
Track plan of Linz Lokalbahnhof, 1913

After the concession for the "standard-gauge local railway from Linz via Eferding to Waizenkirchen" was published in the Reichsgesetzblatt on 25 January 1911, construction of the railway began on 1 December of the same year.

The Stern & Hafferl company paid in bonds worth 1.2 million crowns, in addition to which a number of priority shares were also purchased. The bonds were converted into shares after the local railway opened. The limited investment capital forced the construction management team, led by engineer Josef Stern, to carry out the construction as economically as possible. For this reason, the starting point of the local railway in Linz, the local railway station, was built on land leased from the state railway. A terminus station with two platform tracks and a side track was built. Remarkably, this temporary facility remained in use until 2005. After a police inspection on December 22, 1911, the first section between Linz and Eferding was put into operation on March 21, 1912. There was no official inauguration ceremony. Further stations were built in Alkoven, Eferding, Prambachkirchen, and Waizenkirchen. Wooden waiting rooms were also built at 15 stops.

Rotary converter substations in Dörnbach, Eferding and Waizenkirchen supplied the railway with 750 V direct current. A depot with workshop for maintenance and repairs of the electric multiple units was built in Eferding. Throughout the route, Vignole rails were laid on wooden sleepers and wooden poles carried the overhead line. All electrical equipment was supplied by the Siemens-Schuckert works in Vienna. The line was originally designed for a maximum axle load of 11 tonnes and a top speed of 30 km/h (19 mph).

Construction of the extension Eferding–Waizenkirchen did not proceed entirely smoothly. A rainy summer and difficult terrain caused numerous problems. Despite these difficulties, the section was completed on schedule. The official inspection took place on 10 December 1912. (Note: Statistics on traffic volumes of the Stern & Hafferl railways.)

The Linzer Tages-Post of 13 December 1912 reviewed the construction and reported on the completion:

...On the 9th and 10th of this month the technical-police inspection of the local railway section Eferding–Waizenkirchen took place and yielded a completely satisfactory result, so that, despite all obstacles caused by unfavourable weather and difficult construction terrain, thanks to the energy of the construction company Stern & Hafferl, the Linz–Eferding–Waizenkirchen line now appears to have been completed on time. The opening of the line will take place on Monday the 16th of this month with the trains departing Waizenkirchen at 6:07 a.m. for Linz and from Linz at 7:18 a.m. for Waizenkirchen, which we hereby bring to public notice with reference to the timetable published simultaneously...

==== Early years of operation ====
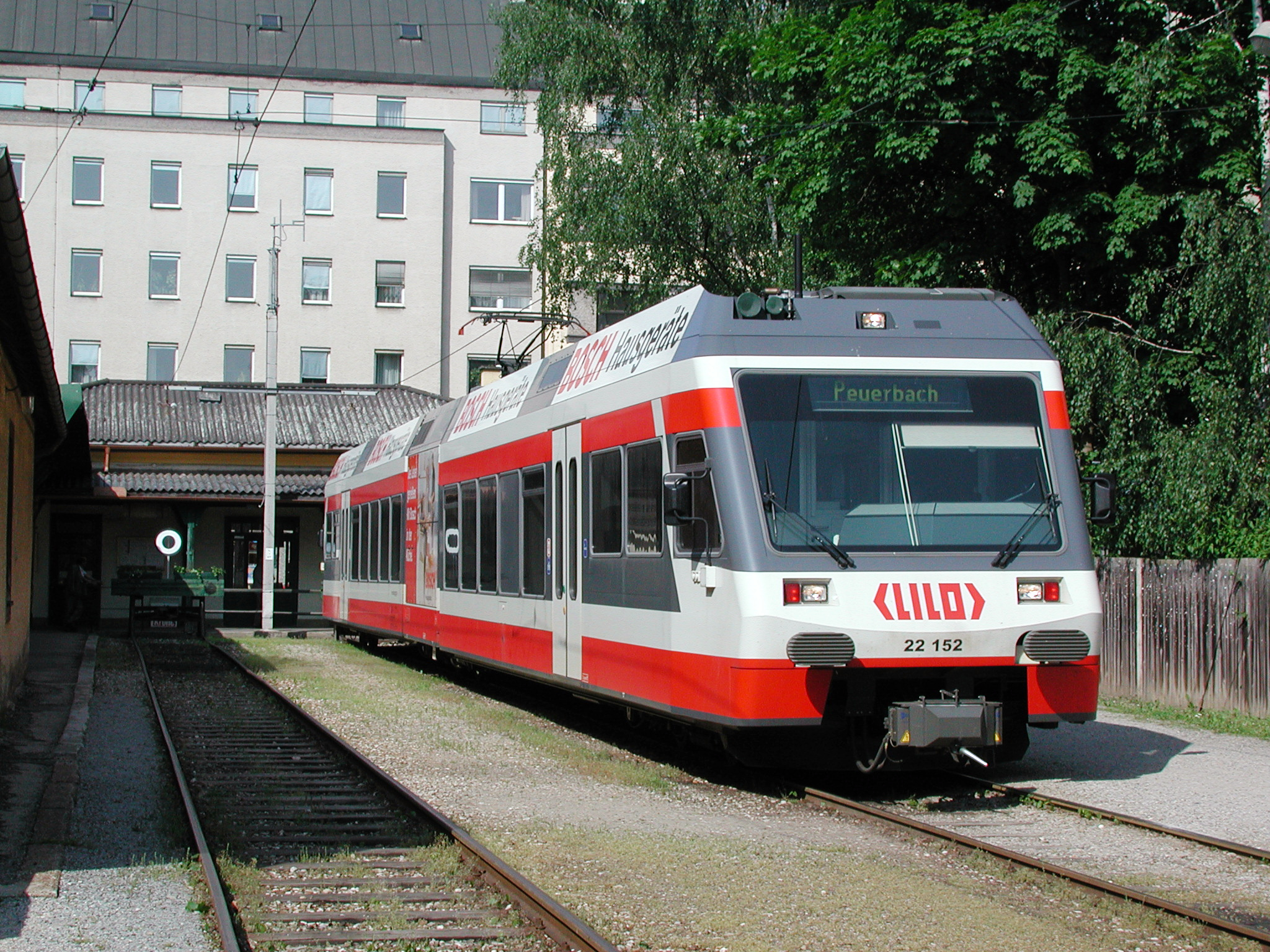
GTW 22 152 at the “temporary” Linz station, May 2002

For operation of the line, four motor cars, four trailer cars, four works vehicles, 16 goods wagons and one electric locomotive were ordered from the Grazer Waggonfabrik. After completion of the second section, the Linz–Eferding–Waizenkirchen local railway was ceremonially opened on 16 December 1912. On 1 January 1913 Stern & Hafferl took over operations, including the supply of electricity. The operating headquarters were located in Eferding.

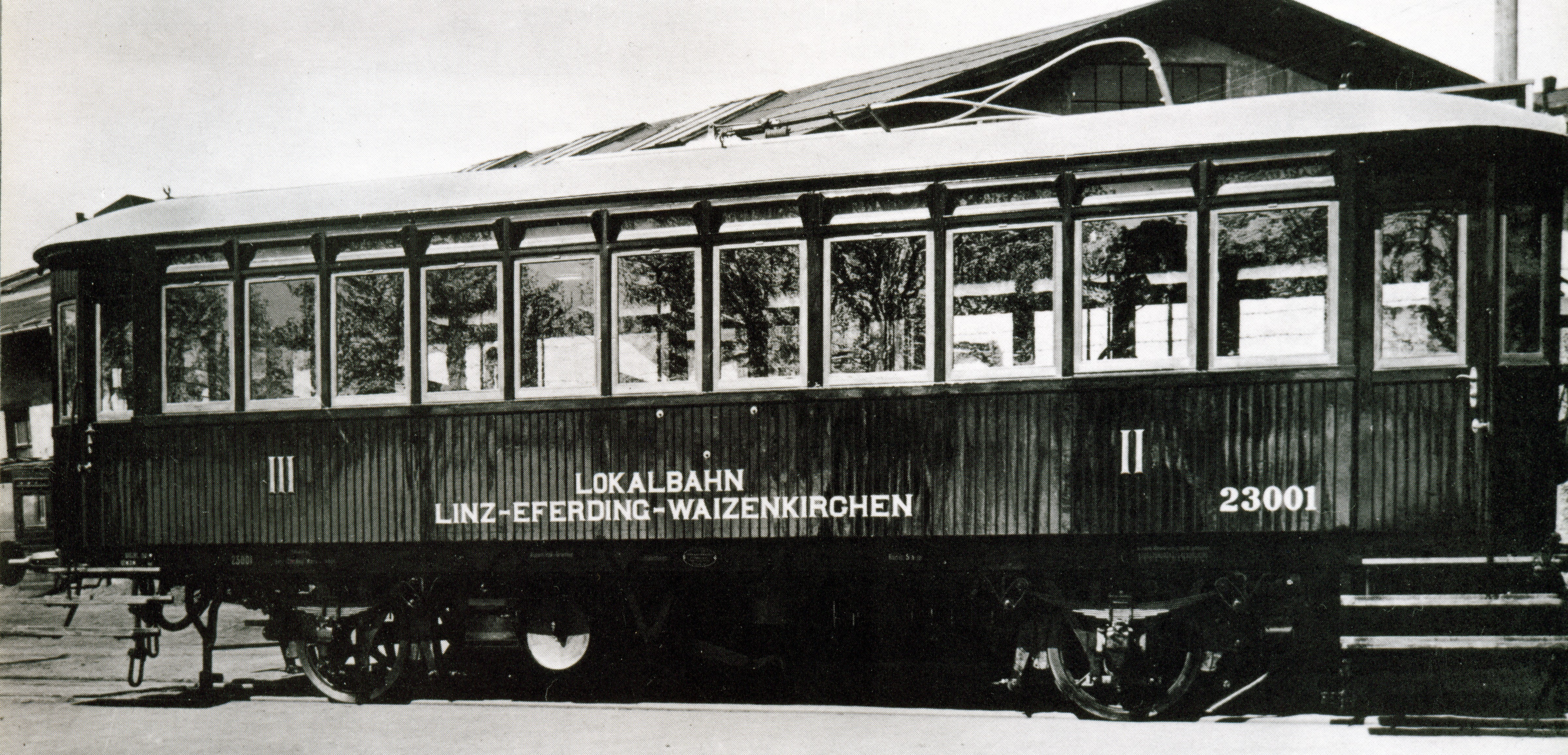
ET 22.105 in delivery condition

In 1912 a journey from Linz to Waizenkirchen took approximately 130 minutes. A comprehensive tariff table was published that year listing fares for all classes of passenger and goods traffic. A single third-class ticket from Linz to Eferding cost 1.50 kronen and to Waizenkirchen 2.50 kronen; second class cost double. Return tickets were twice the single fare. Goods traffic had numerous rate classes; a wagon-load of timber or stone to Eferding cost 32 kronen. In the first full operating year of 1913 the railway carried 202,445 passengers and 11,825 tonnes of freight – regarded as an economic success.

In 1919 another motor car, identical to the original units despite their wooden construction having proved unsatisfactory, was ordered from the Grazer Waggonfabrik and numbered 23.001. Two additional passenger coaches (designated Cl 4 and Cl 5) were also purchased. Due to hyperinflation, the three vehicles together cost four million kronen.

In 1926 the Eferding depot was extended to accommodate the enlarged fleet. In the 1930s a sharp increase in goods traffic revealed a shortage of powerful locomotives; the tractive effort of the existing locomotive No. 1 was no longer sufficient. For this reason the four-axle locomotive Wöllsdorf III was acquired in 1935 and entered service from 1937 as EL 51.01 on the Linz–Eferding–Waizenkirchen line. From 1933 journey times between Linz and Eferding were gradually reduced again, reaching 66 minutes before 1945. From 1936 it was once again possible to operate additional train pairs.

In 1935 the city of Linz held an ideas competition for the redevelopment of the Lokalbahnhof; like many other projects, the resulting proposals were never realised. The line's 25th anniversary was celebrated in 1937. In 1939 the operating company Lokalbahn Linz–Eferding–Waizenkirchen AG was renamed Linzer Lokalbahn AG.

At the beginning of the 1940s, activities in preparation for war caused a sudden surge in traffic volumes in both passenger and freight services. The shortage of multiple units even led to consideration of hiring steam locomotives. All attempts to procure new vehicles failed. In 1939 only 50-year-old former Vienna Stadtbahn cars could be taken over from the Deutsche Reichsbahn. For war-economy reasons broken windows could not be repaired and were merely boarded over with plywood. Eventually electric locomotives were also acquired, followed three years later by two multiple units and two further coaches. These vehicles, however, had different couplers from the original fleet and initially could only run singly. In 1940 Stern & Hafferl purchased another four-axle locomotive, Wöllsdorf IV, which became EL 51.02. From 21 April 1943 the Stern & Hafferl numbering scheme still in use today was introduced on the Linzer Lokalbahn.

In 1944 a depot fire in Eferding destroyed one of the recently acquired locomotives, two multiple units and one passenger coach. As only three electric locomotives and five multiple units had been available before the fire, the loss was severe. A completely new depot was built afterwards. As a temporary measure, multiple units ET 184.02 and ET 184.04 together with trailers EB 184.06 and 16 were hired from the Hohenfurth (Vyšší Brod) local railway in South Bohemia. These vehicles had centre-buffer couplers and were incompatible with the rest of the fleet; they were purchased outright in 1951.

The air raids on Linz during World War II severely affected the railway. Tracks and overhead lines were frequently damaged, and repairs could only be provisional owing to material shortages. During air-raid warnings all vehicles were immediately removed from Eferding station and parked under trees on open track; their brown paint provided good camouflage. In January 1945 the Deutsche Reichsbahn began constructing a bunker complex with an associated field railway; both were dismantled after the war. The war placed enormous demands on the railway. Transport capacity was insufficient, the rapid increase in passengers could not be managed, and staff shortages led to women being employed not only as conductors but also as train drivers. Ministry-ordered blackout measures further complicated operations; motor-car windows had to be blacked out as thoroughly as possible. Additional problems included a shortage of multiple units, weak track formation and inadequate power supply. In 1944 the line carried a still-unbeaten record of 2,790,593 passengers. In early 1945 bombing damage made operation impossible between Linz and Untergaumberg, and services had to be suspended.

=== Post-World War II ===
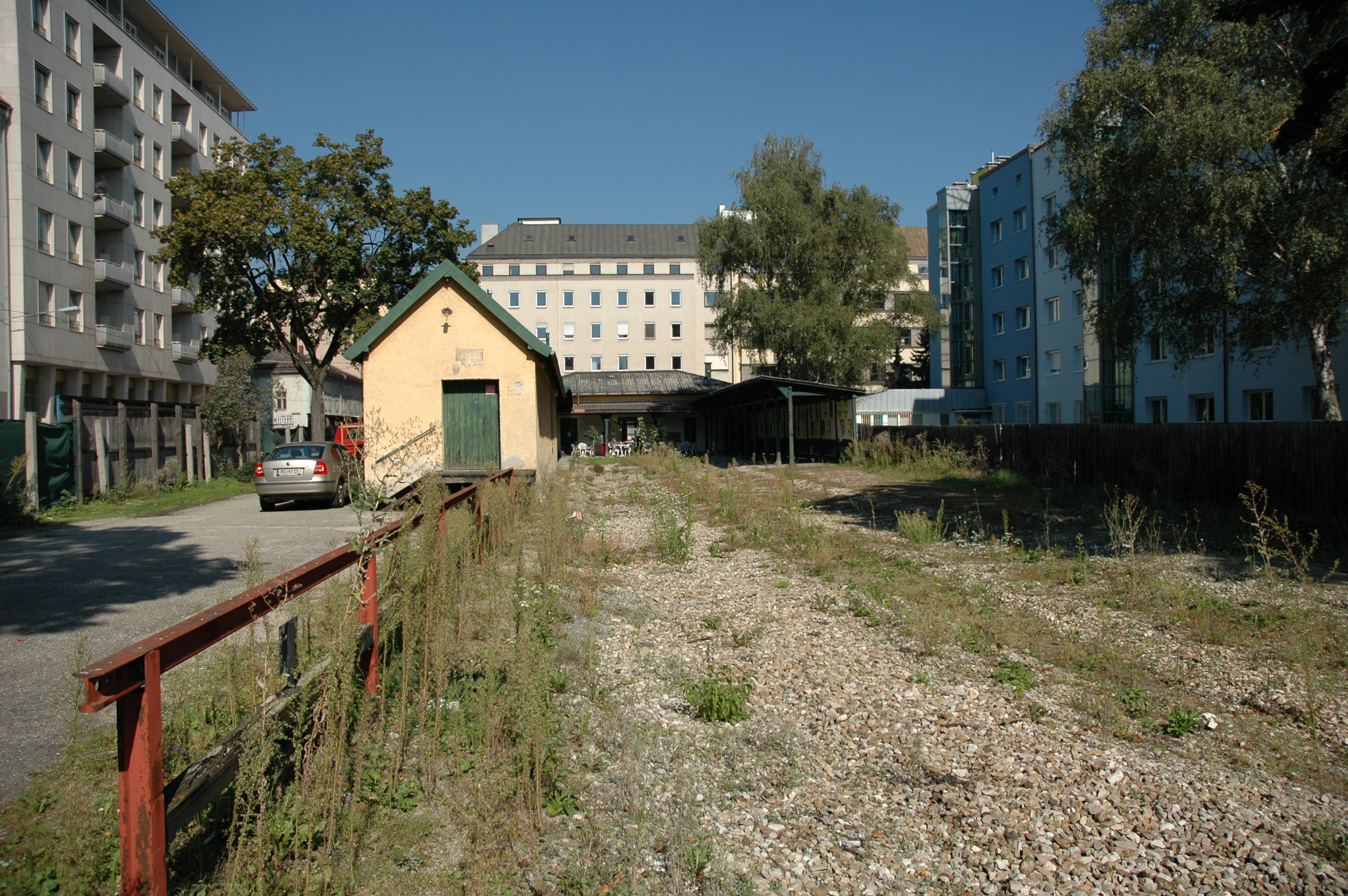
Former LILO train station on Coulinstraße

American troops occupied the operating headquarters in Eferding and set up a temporary prisoner-of-war camp at the station, making that section impassable. A skeleton emergency timetable was therefore introduced, which could only be slightly expanded after the Linz–Untergaumberg section was repaired. Passenger trains were permitted again from mid-May 1945, but – like the on-demand freight trains – only under military escort. As after the First World War, journey times increased sharply.

After the war the people of Linz used the railway for so-called "hamster trips" (food-foraging excursions) to stock up on provisions in the rural communities of the Eferdinger Becken.

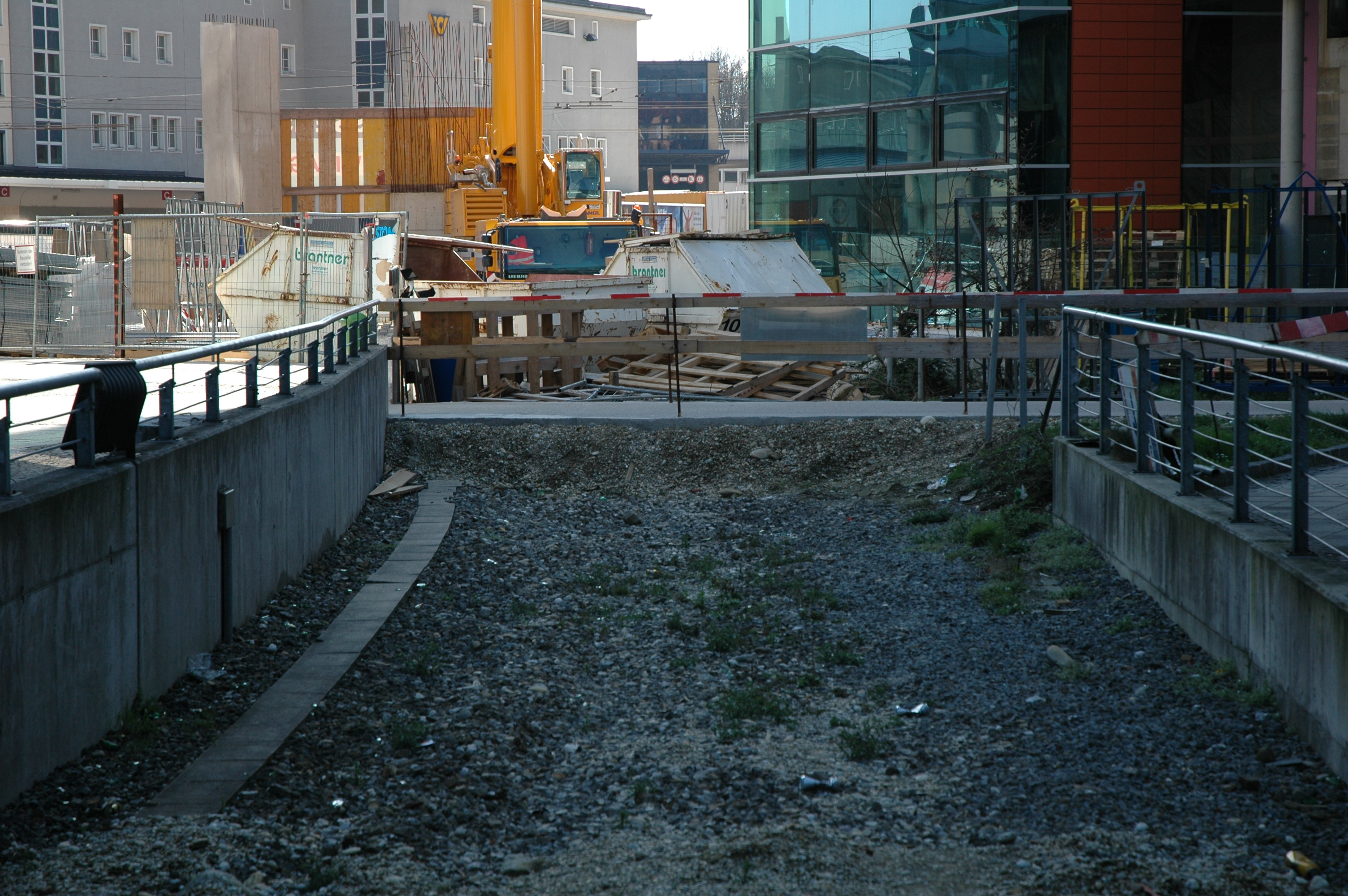
The route to the old LILO station in Linz ran across what would later become the construction site for the Wissensturm (construction site in the background)

Between 1946 and 1952 a comprehensive repair programme was carried out in the Eferding workshops. The motor cars received new steel bodies in place of their wooden ones. From 1952 all passenger multiple units were fitted with pneumatic deadman's equipment, allowing one-man operation and significantly reducing operating costs. After vehicles and infrastructure had been repaired, journey times across the whole route were substantially reduced again. Fast trains that skipped some stops were introduced, but later lost popularity because of the stop-request system and were eventually withdrawn. For the first time locomotive-hauled passenger trains also appeared.

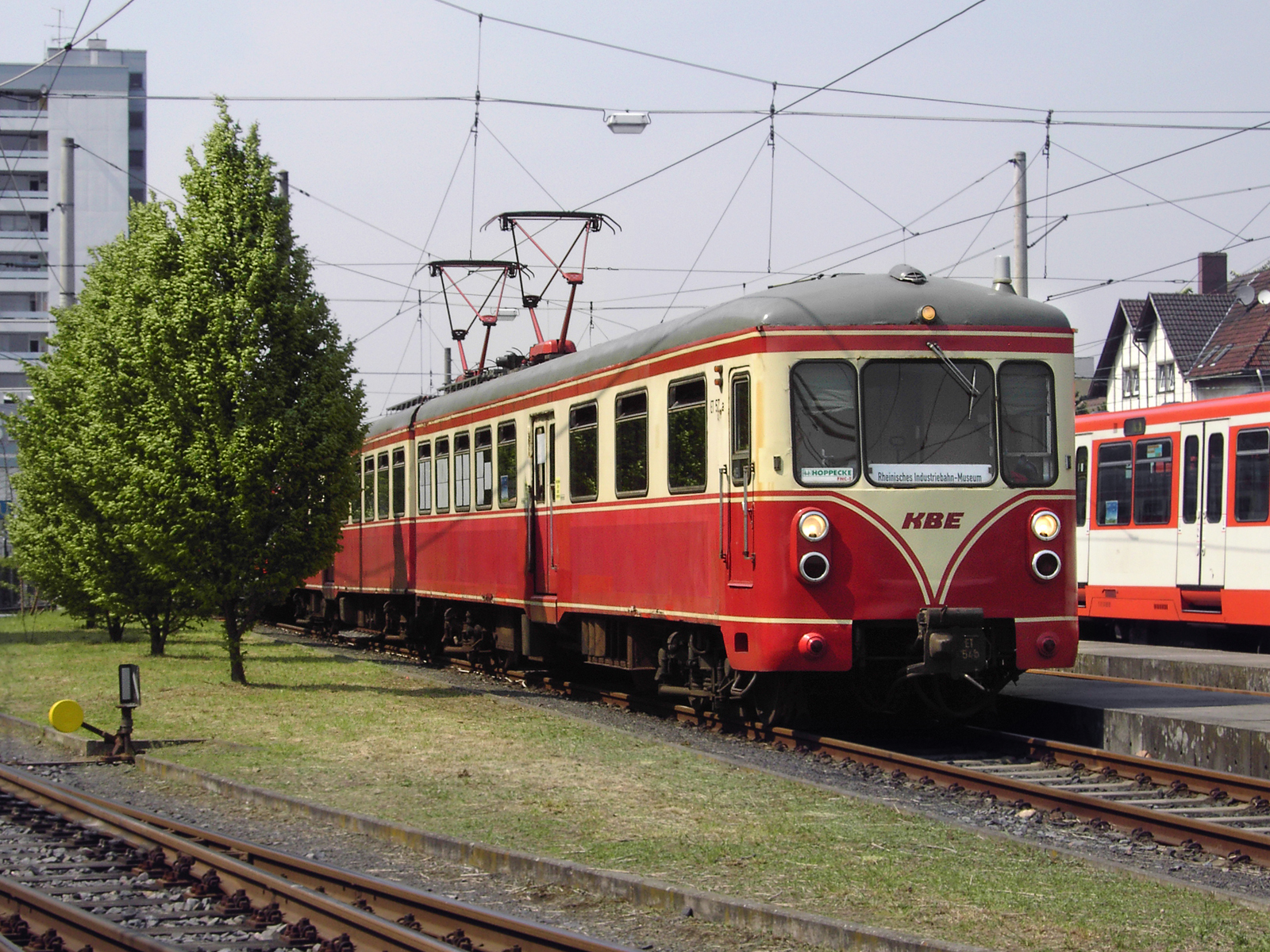
Several such railcars were taken over by the Cologne-Bonn Railway (KBE). (Shown here is railcar ET 57, preserved in a museum in Cologne, in KBE colors.)

During the 1950s numerous track improvements were made. The entire permanent way was renewed in stages. New heavier rails and turnouts raised the permissible axle load to 20 tonnes and the maximum speed to 50 km/h (31 mph). Stronger wooden sleepers were installed and the ballast renewed. The old wooden waiting shelters were replaced by modern concrete-and-glass structures.

Alongside these upgrades, new rolling stock was acquired. Linzer Lokalbahn AG ordered six four-axle passenger coaches and two new multiple units from Simmering-Graz-Pauker AG; these entered service as ET 22.106 and 107. Electrical equipment was supplied by ELIN AG. The maiden trip of these vehicles took place on 22 March 1951; the Linzer Volksblatt reported:

In the presence of Ing. Stern [...] the inaugural run of the new three-car multiple-unit set on the Linz–Eferding–Waizenkirchen line took place yesterday afternoon. [...] All participants in the inaugural trip were able to confirm that this was a piece of excellent workmanship. [...] Powered by four 120 hp motors and with a top speed of 50 km/h, an 80-percent improvement in the timetable has been achieved.

On 11 May 1954 passenger train 6922 derailed due to subsidence; multiple unit ET 22.103 sustained minor damage. On 4 August of the same year passenger train 6929 also derailed, but again ET 22.103 suffered no serious damage. Third class was abolished in Austria on 1 August 1956; class designations were either changed to second class or removed entirely. In the same year SGP Graz delivered a new freight locomotive that replaced E 20.006 and was numbered 20.007.

In the 1960s several new acquisitions were planned but could not be realised for lack of funds. In the 1970s, however, seven multiple-unit sets were purchased from the Köln-Frechen-Benzelrather Eisenbahn. After overhaul they were renumbered ET 22.130–136 with control trailers ES 22.230–236. The Eferding workshops and Voest Alpine refurbished the sets. The first two units were presented to the public for the railway's 60th anniversary. These vehicles became the flagship of the LILO, being far more modern than the older units (automatically closing doors, stop-request buttons and Scharfenberg couplers). Because the 1950s multiple units remained indispensable and were operated in mixed formations with the new sets, journey times were not reduced.

The 1970s also saw several serious accidents, including the worst in the railway's history on 13 October 1974 when a rail break at kilometre 26.3 near Eferding caused the derailment of unit 21.151. The vehicle was so badly damaged that it had to be withdrawn as beyond economic repair.

In 1971 a freight record of 219,282 tonnes was set when the railway was heavily used for construction of the Ottensheim-Wilhering Danube power station. On 1 December 1973 the Florianerbahn, also operated by Stern & Hafferl, was closed.

In July 1977 a Lufthansa publicity stunt made headlines when mounted "Indians" staged a mock attack on a LILO train near Kirchberg-Thürnau. In 1978 the share capital of Linzer Lokalbahn AG was increased to 4.75 million schillings (approximately €354,200).

On 17 May 1980 a well-publicised special run with the "Glass Train" took place, hauled by Stern & Hafferl locomotive E 22.001. In 1975 journey time between Linz and Neumarkt was reduced to 92 minutes. The same year a vehicle washing plant was built.

In 1987 Linzer Lokalbahn AG celebrated the railway's 75th anniversary with a major festival. At the start of the jubilee year, second-hand multiple-unit sets were acquired from the Köln-Bonner Eisenbahnen (original numbers ET 53, 55, 59 and 60). ET 59 and 60 arrived at Eferding station on 25 February, followed by ET 53 and 55 on 29 March. All units were fully overhauled and brought up to current safety standards, entering service as ET 22.141–144. They were among the star attractions at the "75 Years of the Linzer Lokalbahn" celebrations on 11 and 12 September 1987.

These acquisitions allowed all the oldest units to be retired, further reducing journey times and eliminating the need for shunting movements previously required with the older motor cars. On 1 January 1998 the Neumarkt–Waizenkirchen–Peuerbach local railway was legally merged with the Linzer Lokalbahn.

Integration of LILO into the central station in Linz since 2005

There had long been plans to integrate the LILO into Linz Hauptbahnhof. As late as the 1987 anniversary year, the then operating manager Karl Zwirchmayr stated in his speech: "... because of the enormous costs, realisation of this project cannot currently be foreseen ...". Eighteen years later it finally became reality: since 18 November 2005 the LILO no longer terminates at the old temporary station in Coulinstraße but runs directly to the local-services platform at Linz Hauptbahnhof. The €24 million reconstruction of the station as a central interchange required the station building to be rebuilt ten metres closer to the station park in order to make space for the local railway tracks. The new platforms were equipped with lifts and escalators and made fully accessible. The old Lokalbahnhof was given a ceremonial farewell on 8 November 2005 with special trains operated by ET 22.105 and an auction of station fittings. The official opening of the integration into Linz Hauptbahnhof took place on 18 November of the same year.

The new Linz terminus brought a marked improvement for passengers. Convenient connections now exist to ÖBB trains, the Linz tramway, the Linz trolleybus system and city bus routes. Dynamic passenger information displays on the platforms and in the pedestrian subways greatly improved orientation.

Integration into the main station required new dual-system multiple units capable of switching from the LILO's 750 V DC to the ÖBB's 15 kV AC for the tracks around the station. From 2005 a partial clock-face timetable was introduced between Linz and Eferding, Linz and Peuerbach, and Waizenkirchen and Neumarkt. Since 2005 the line has been cleared for a maximum speed of 70 km/h (43 mph) and a 20-tonne axle load. Further accessibility improvements were implemented in 2006 and 2007.

With the construction of the tram subway under Linz Hauptbahnhof around 2015, the LILO gained a short, weather-protected interchange connection to the tram network.

== Current operations ==
=== Ownership ===
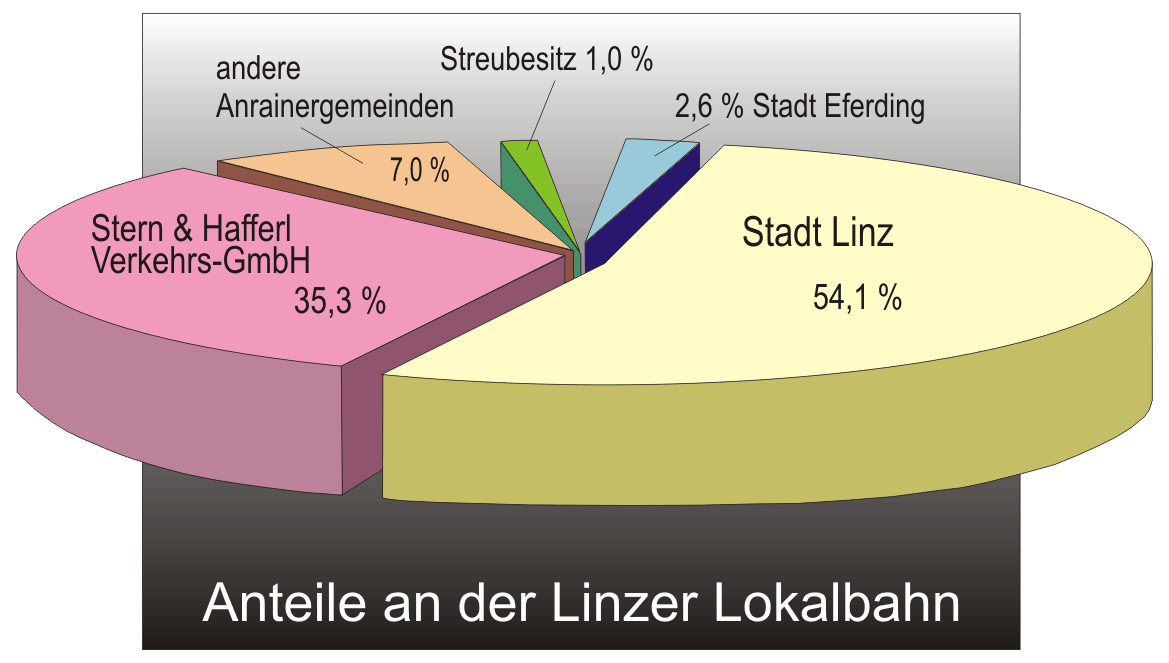
Proportions

Linzer Lokalbahn AG is a public limited company under Austrian law with registered share capital of €690,391. The city of Linz holds 54.3% of the shares. Stern & Hafferl Verkehrs-GmbH, which also manages operations, owns 35.3%. The city of Eferding holds 2.6%, while Leonding and Peuerbach each hold 1.0%. The remaining shares are distributed among neighbouring municipalities (5.0%) or in free float (1.0%).

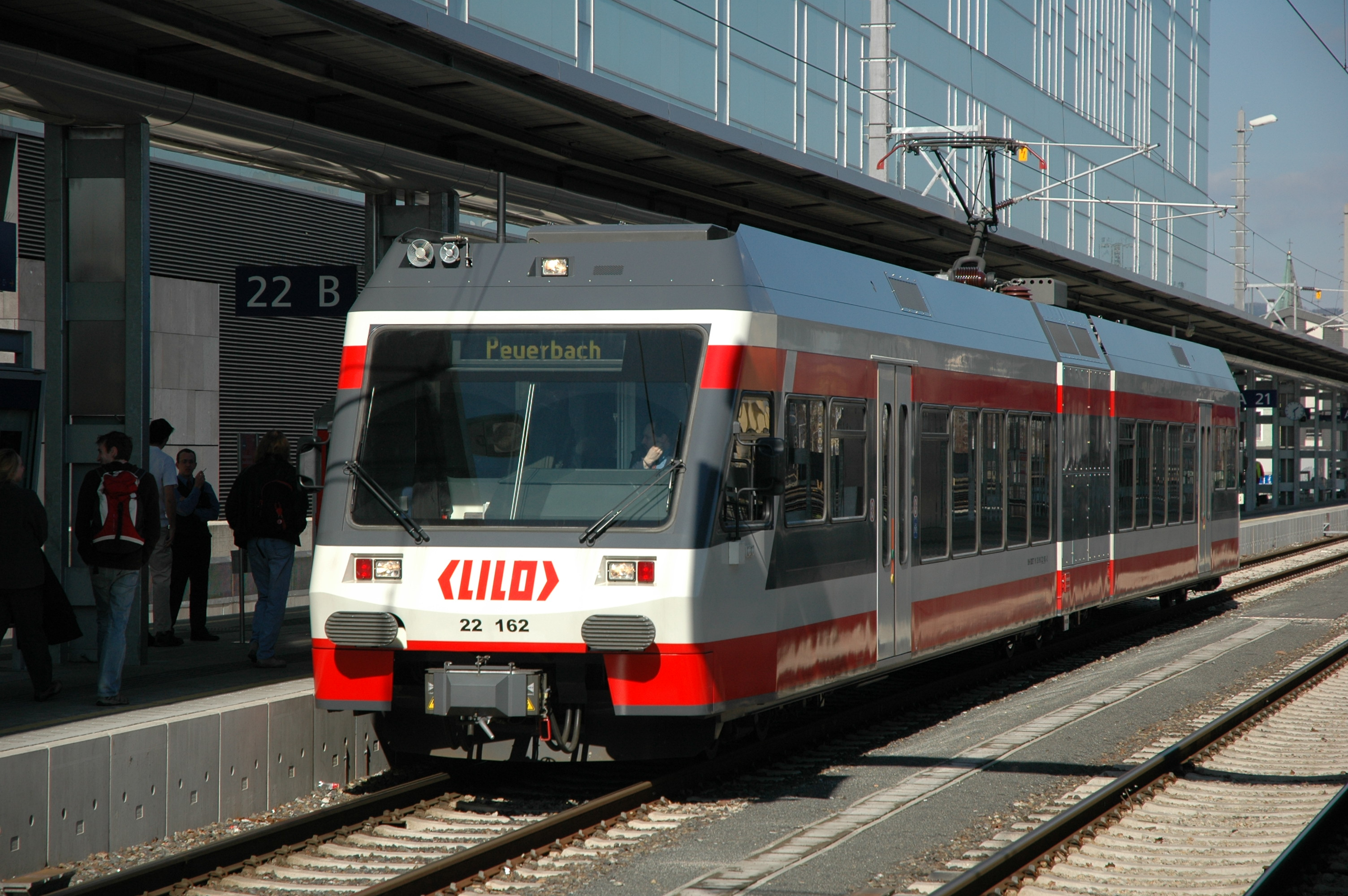
LILO's Stadler GTW low-floor articulated railcar at Linz Central Station.

In 2005 the Linzer Lokalbahn carried more than 1.6 million passengers. Services partly operate to a clock-face timetable. Since the nationwide timetable change on 15 December 2013 it has been possible to travel from Linz to Neumarkt-Kallham without changing trains; previously passengers had to change at Waizenkirchen or Niederspaching. Train movements are controlled by a GPS-based train control system. Crossing arrangements have been handled by radio since 1987. Turnouts required for scheduled crossings are spring points equipped with point heating; they are identified by a blue light that shows when the turnout is set to the normal position. With the exception of the points at Eferding station, which can be remotely operated by wire from a type 5007 signal box, all turnouts are hand-operated. Sidings are key-locked and secured by derailers.

Trains stop at 44 stations, 37 of them on request only (by raising a hand on the platform or pressing the request button inside the train).

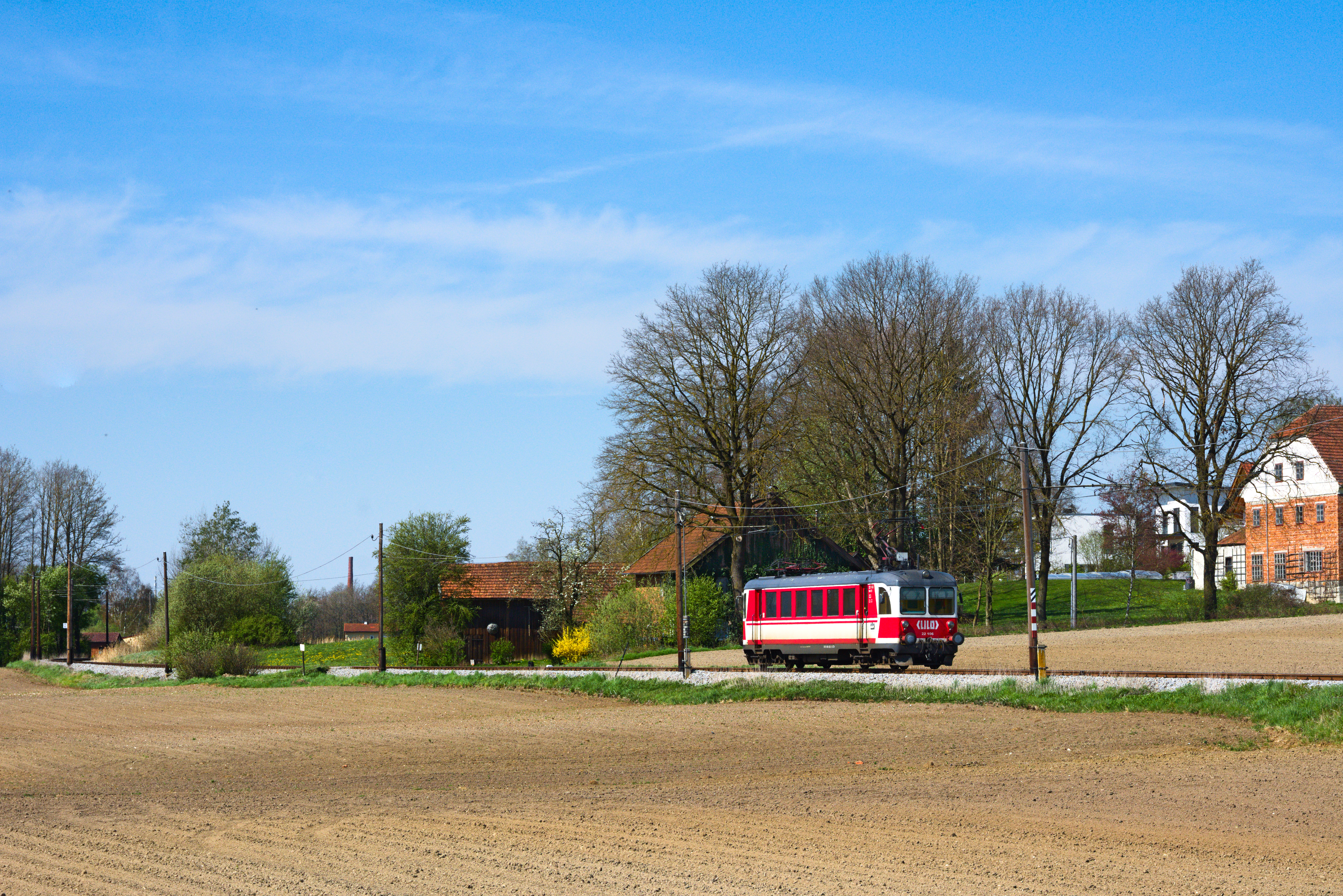
ET 22.106 on the western section of the local railway between Kledt and Strasshof

Accidents are now rare and mostly limited to environmentally caused derailments that have never resulted in serious vehicle damage. Collisions with road vehicles occur more frequently, mainly at level crossings protected only by stop signs.

In December 2022 Detlef Wimmer was elected by the supervisory board as CEO of Linzer Lokalbahn AG with effect from February 2023.

== Driver training ==
To become a multiple-unit or locomotive driver for the Linzer Lokalbahn, applicants generally complete in-house training regardless of any previously learned or practised profession. This training lasts approximately eight months and covers the following content: signalling and operating regulations, fundamentals of electrical engineering, electrical and mechanical design of the vehicles, braking system, overhead line power supply, and safety equipment. This is followed by the practical part, consisting of repairs to the multiple units (in the workshop in Eferding or the main workshop in Vorchdorf) and training runs. Thereafter, new employees work for about one year as conductors and train managers while being prepared and trained for the ÖBB examination. After successfully passing the ÖBB multiple-unit driver examination, employees are permitted to operate trains as far as Linz station.

== Vehicle fleet ==
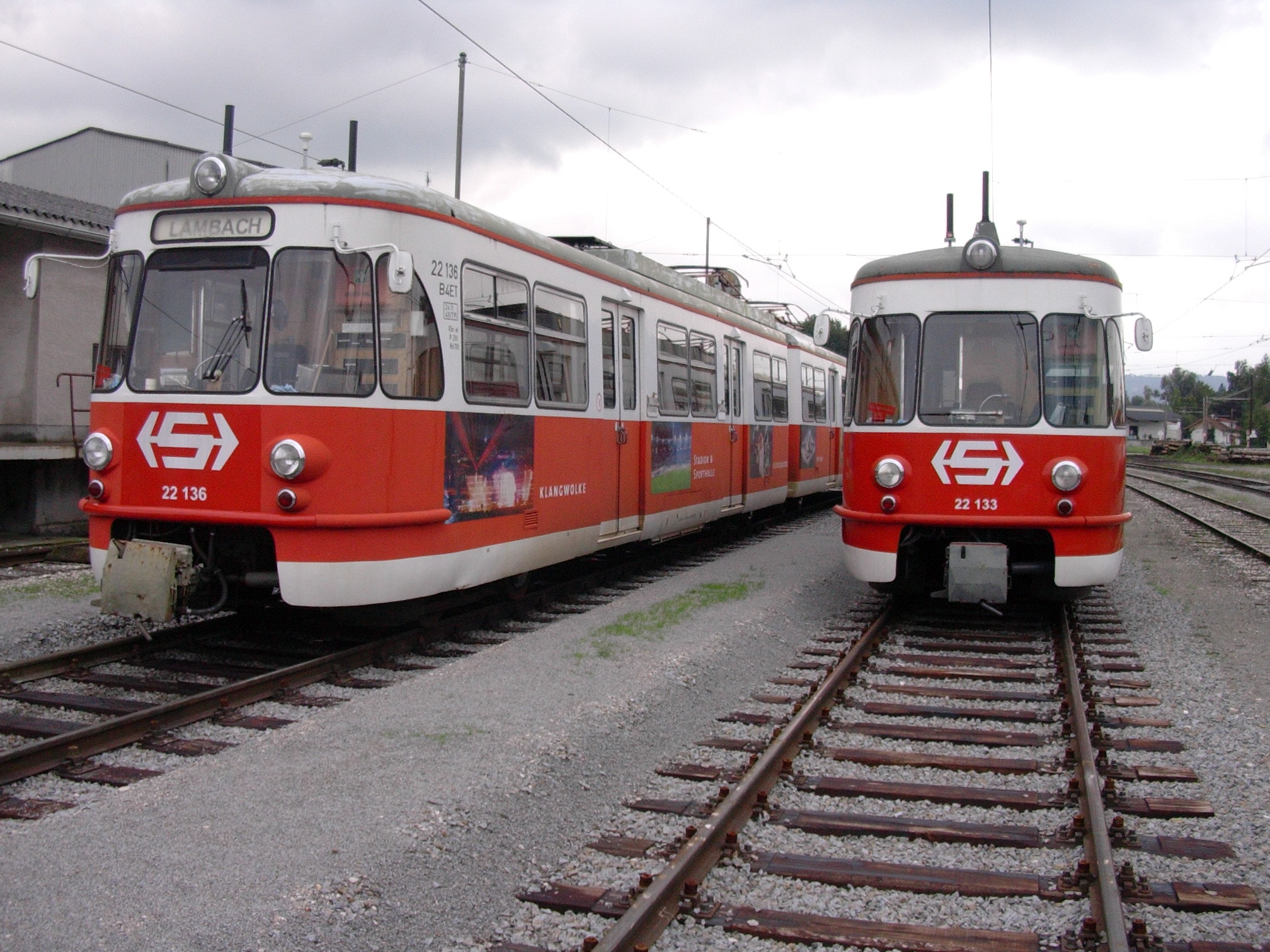
Two “Cologne” units in Vorchdorf

Since 2001 the line has been operated by low-floor multiple units of the type Stadler GTW, which replaced the vehicles taken over in 1970 from the Kölner Verkehrs-Betriebe and in 1987 from the Köln-Bonner Eisenbahnen. The GTWs were numbered ET 22.151–164 in the fleet. All units are additionally equipped for the 15 kV 16.7 Hz system, are air-conditioned, fully accessible, and offer 126 seats and 108 standing places. The multiple units have air-suspended running bogies and automatically closing doors. Multiple working of up to three units is also possible. Stern & Hafferl additionally installed stop-request buttons in every unit.

On weekdays between Peuerbach or Niederspaching and Neumarkt-Kallham, the 1951-built ET 20.114 is deployed from the start of service until midday.

The LILO currently has four electric locomotives and 18 electric multiple units in service on its line. Two further former LILO multiple units have been loaned to Vorchdorf. Three historic vehicles have been retained as heritage units. Locomotive 1 "Liesel" is still occasionally used for shunting. The Stadler GTWs are the flagship vehicles of the Linzer Lokalbahn.

Vehicle repairs and maintenance are carried out at the depot workshop in Eferding. Major damage is repaired at Stern & Hafferl's main workshop in Vorchdorf. The local railway has four engine sheds where vehicles are stabled. Of the former flagship "Cologne" sets, only 22.137 remains, now used as a works vehicle; four further cars are still held in reserve; all other "Cologne" units were scrapped in Lambach.

No.	Origin	Year of manufacture	Axle arrangement	Overall length	Weight	V max	Power	Seats/Standing room	Comments	Photos
ET 20.114	SGP	1951	Bo'Bo'	18.100 mm	40 t	70 km/h	304 kW	64/36	ex SLB ET 32, ex ET 22.108, leased from SLB	
ET 22.151–ET 22.164	Stadler Rail	2000/2005	2'+Bo+2':	38.200 mm	57,5/60 t	120 km/h	520 kW	126/108	Dual-system vehicles 750 V DC / 15 kV AC	
ET 22.105	Graz Carriage Works	1921	Bo	11.500 mm	1,5 t	50 km/h	100 kW	55/12	Originally ET 23.001, nostalgia vehicle 1	
ET 22.106	SGP/ELIN	1951	Bo'Bo'	16.900 mm	39 t	70 km/h	376 kW	56/36	until 1988 ET 20.112, currently leased to Vorchdorferbahn	
ET 22.107	SGP/ELIN	1951	Bo'Bo'	16.900 mm	39 t	70 km/h	376 kW	52/36	until 1994 ET 20.114, currently leased to Vorchdorferbahn	
ET 22.109	Graz Carriage Works	1908	Bo	11.600 mm	17 t	50 km/h	108 kW	36/18	ex ET 21.001, ex NWP ET 21.150, heritage vehicle	
ET 22.133	Westwaggon	1954	Bo'Bo'	15.750 mm	24 t	60 km/h	272 kW	49	ex KFBE 1288, reserve railcar, loaned to Vorchdorf	
ET 22.136	Westwaggon	1953	Bo'Bo'	15.750 mm	24 t	60 km/h	272 kW	49	KBFE 1290, reserve railcar, loaned to Vorchdorf	
ET 22.137	Westwaggon	1954	Bo'Bo'	17.150 mm	25 t	60 km/h	272 kW	48	ex KBFE 1289, used as a work railcar 2 (Note: All data: current vehicle statistics from LILO)	
E 22.001	Ganz & Co	1915	Bo'Bo'	11.700 mm	30 t	40 km/h	192 kW	–	Multiple control system, formerly Wöllersdorf III, in operation since 1935	
E 22.002	Grazer W.	1912	Bo	6.900 mm	19 t	25 km/h	74 kW	–	Nostalgic vehicle, originally No. 1	
E 22.004	Ganz & Co	1916	Bo'Bo'	11.700 mm	30 t	40 km/h	192 kW	–	ex E 20.004, multiple control system, formerly POHÉV 5, in inventory since 1945	
E 22.005	Ganz & Co	1915	Bo'Bo'	11.700 mm	30 t	40 km/h	192 kW	–	ex E 20.005, multiple control, formerly Wöllersdorf II, in operation since 1947	
ES 22.233	Westwaggon	1954	4	15.750 mm	18,5 t	60 km/h	-	49	ex KFBE 2289, reserve car, loaned to Vorchdorf	
ES 22.236	Westwaggon	1953	4	15.750 mm	18,5 t	60 km/h	-	49	ex KFBE 2290, reserve car, loaned to Vorchdorf	
Gkklm 22.307	SGP	1949	2	10.000 mm	9,8 t	80 km/h	–	-	Former ÖBB, freight car, green/white	

^{1} From 1943 onwards, the vehicle was designated ET 22.105. The transfer of the railcar to Haager Lies in 1985 led to it being renamed ET 25.105 and used on the Haager Lies line. In 1995, the vehicle was handed over to the Marizeller Museumstramway, where it was restored to its original condition. In 2000, the railcar returned to the Linz Local Railway in exchange for ET 22.101. Today, the vehicle bears the number 22.105 and is part of the LILO's nostalgia collection.

^{2} ET 22.137 was converted into a work car and is equipped with a lubricating current collector. The red/ivory-painted ET 22.109 is covered with an advertisement for a bakery.

In addition to railcars, locomotives, and trailers, the Linz Local Railway has only a few freight cars that are used for transporting goods. Most of its freight cars were either scrapped or converted into work cars that are used for maintenance work.

=== Numbering and lettering ===
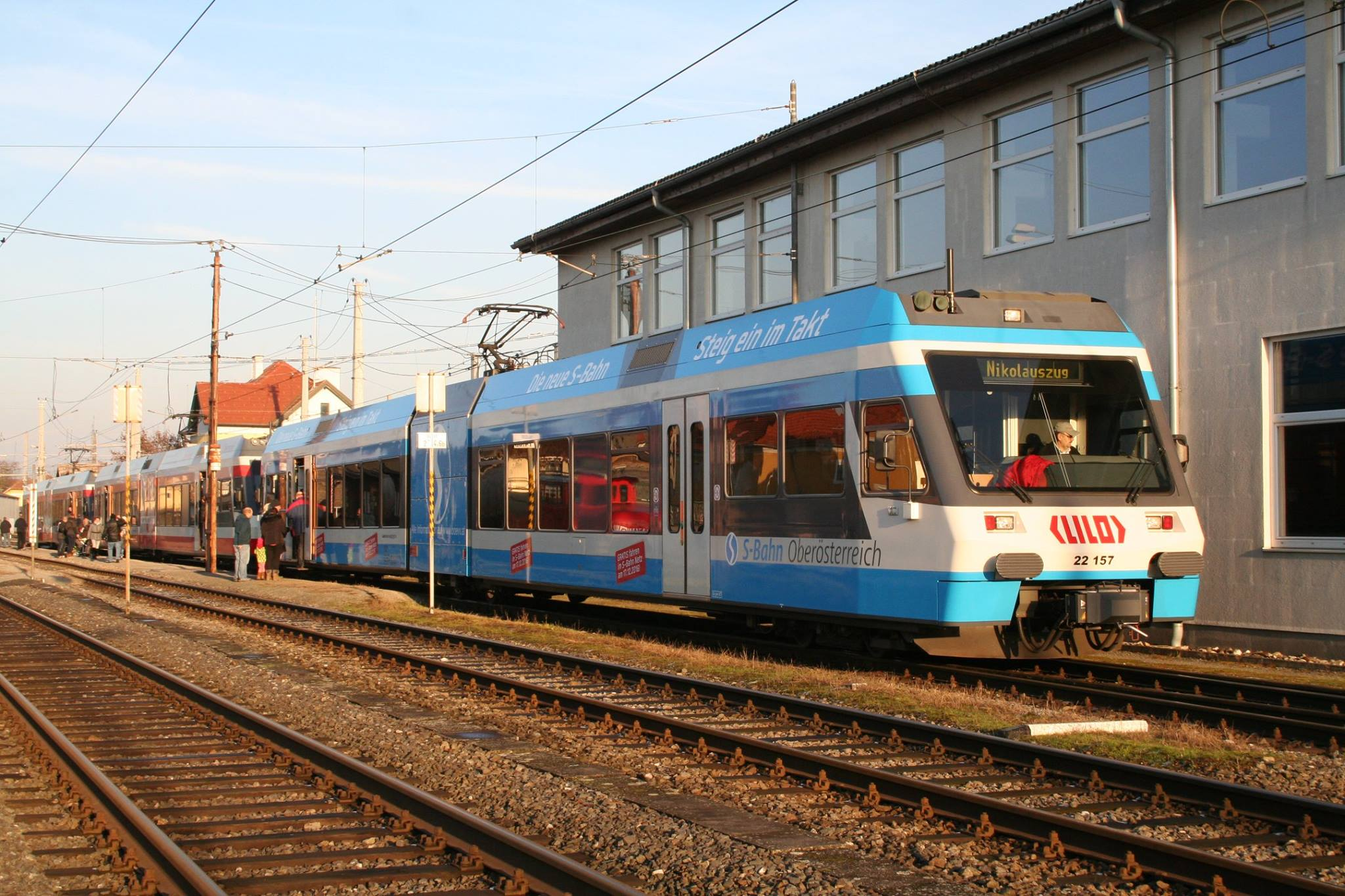
GTW in S-Bahn decals on the MEC Eferding special train

As is standard for all Stern & Hafferl vehicles, the numbering scheme uses five-digit numbers. The first two digits indicate the owner: 21 stood for the Lokalbahn Neumarkt–Waizenkirchen–Peuerbach, while 22 denoted the Lokalbahn Linz–Eferding–Waizenkirchen. Since the merger into the LILO, only the owner code 22 is used. The following three digits (third to fifth) indicate the vehicle type and sequential number (see Stern & Hafferl numbering scheme).

A prefix letter before the number identifies the vehicle type: E for electric locomotive, ET for electric multiple unit, P for passenger coach, G for goods wagon, and X for service vehicles.

All vehicles were originally lettered with the full company name of the line on which they operated: Lokalbahn Neumarkt–Waizenkirchen–Peuerbach AG or Lokalbahn Linz–Eferding–Waizenkirchen. These inscriptions, in gold raised brass letters, were applied to the original fleet's powered vehicles. In the anniversary year 1937 the long lettering was replaced by the abbreviated route names LEW or NWP. In 1939 these were superseded by signs reading Linzer Lokalbahn AG (often abbreviated LLB). This abbreviation was later replaced by the current <LILO> branding.

The original multiple units were painted brown, while locomotives were dark green. In 1975 this green livery was replaced by red on all locomotives except No. 1. Locomotive 1, still in its original livery, thus represents the early appearance of the powered vehicles. Modern multiple units carry the white/traffic red colour scheme that remains typical of Stern & Hafferl vehicles today.

=== Original rolling stock ===
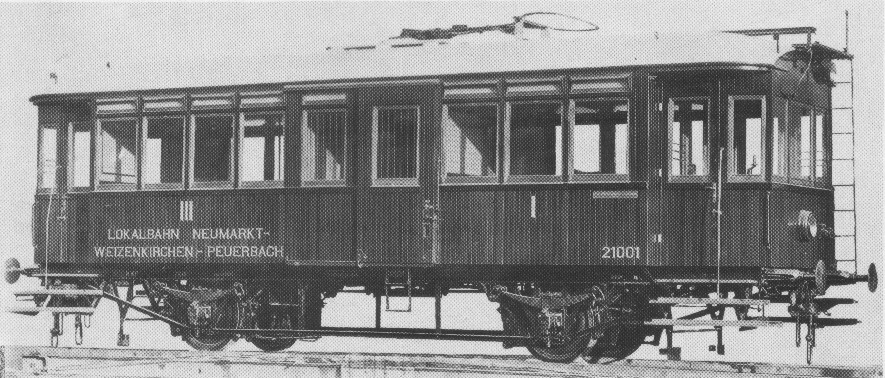
Multiple unit 21.001 (1908)

For cost reasons, inexpensive two-axle powered vehicles were chosen. For both lines they were ordered from the Grazer Waggonfabrik and Siemens-Schuckert Wien.

The motor cars delivered for the Linz–Eferding–Waizenkirchen route had wooden bodies. They provided 16 seats in second class and 39 seats in third class; second-class seats were upholstered, while third-class seats had simple wooden slats. Each vehicle had twelve windows with drop-down upper lights. The end platforms were open, exposing the crew to the weather. The motor cars were equipped with a slip-ring controller, vacuum brake and hand spindle brake. A foot-operated bell, roof-mounted bell and horn served as signalling devices. The units were numbered 22.000–22.003 and later renumbered 22.101–22.104.

The locomotives also had wooden bodies, and their electrical equipment was essentially the same as that of the motor cars. This is still visible on the surviving locomotive (nicknamed "Liesel"), which is now part of the Linzer Lokalbahn's heritage fleet.

The four passenger coaches, each weighing only 6.2 tonnes, likewise had wooden bodies and provided 38 third-class seats. Each coach had eight windows with drop-down upper lights.

For the Neumarkt–Waizenkirchen–Peuerbach route, three similar two-axle motor cars were acquired in 1908 and numbered 21.001–003. These were equipped with lyre-type pantographs. Their electrical equipment was very similar to that of the LEW vehicles. A number of goods wagons were also purchased (see table).

Original rolling stock (1911–1912)
Original designation	Later designation	Year built	Manufacturer	Route	Remarks
21.001–21.003	21.150–21.152	1908	Grazer Waggonfabrik	NWP	In regular service until 1975; 21.150 (since 1998 22.109) preserved as heritage vehicle
Cl 1–Cl 2	21.201–21.202	1908	Grazer Waggonfabrik	NWP	In service until 1908
G 1–G 3	21.301–21.303	1908	Grazer Waggonfabrik	NWP	Goods wagons; withdrawn 1980
22.000–22.003	22.101–22.104	1912	Grazer Waggonfabrik	LEW	Motor cars; 101 and 102 destroyed in the 1944 depot fire
1	22.002	1912	Grazer Waggonfabrik	LEW	Electric locomotive, still preserved, nicknamed "Liesel"
Cl 1–Cl 4	22.201–22.204	1911	Grazer Waggonfabrik	LEW	Passenger coaches; 22.201 suffered fire damage (Note: All data: vehicle statistics of the Linzer Lokalbahn)

== Route ==
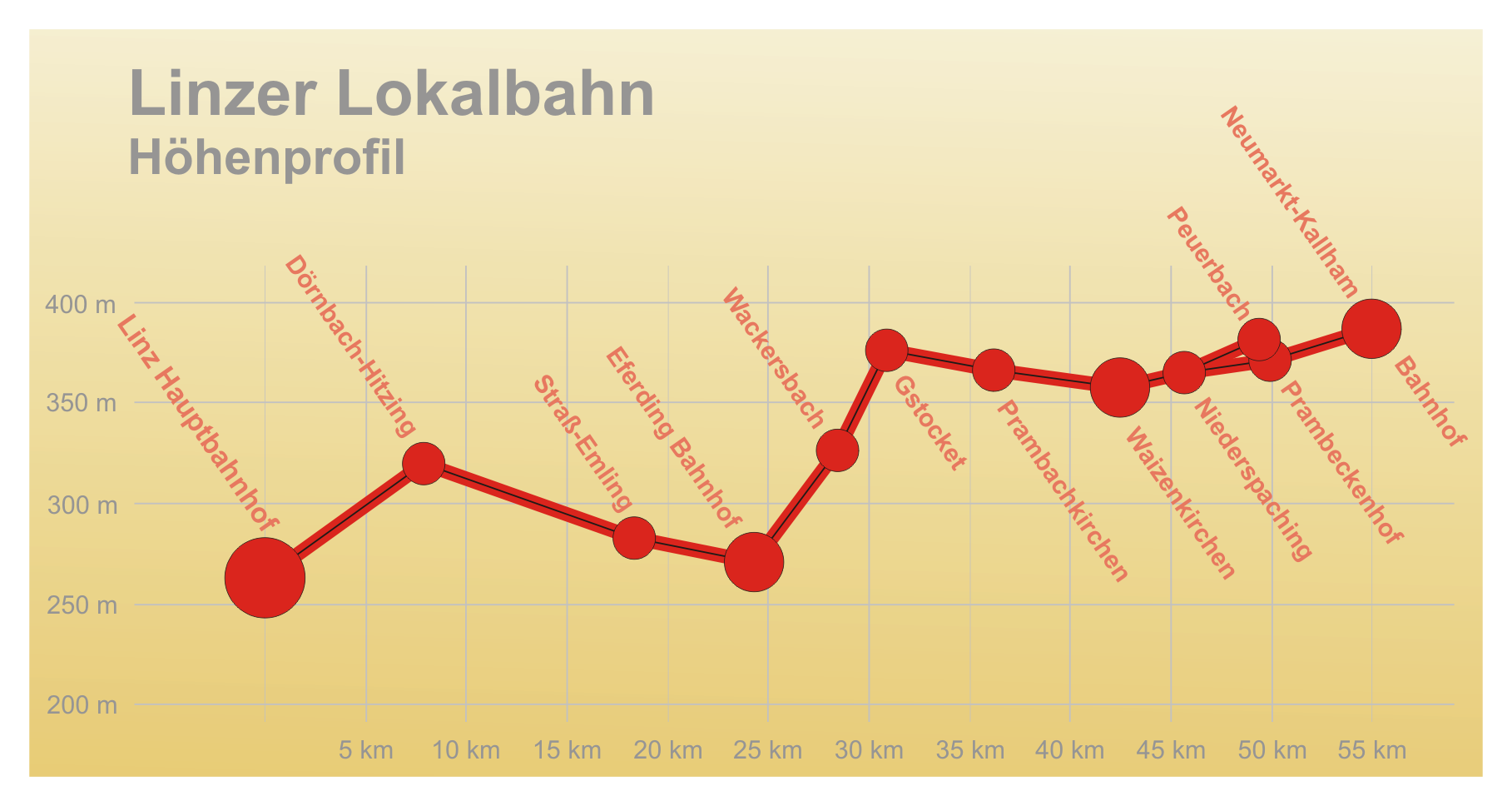
Route profile of the LILO

=== Alignment ===
The line is 58.5 km long and climbs a total of 127 metres. The LILO has 44 stops in total and 252 level crossings.

Crossing points for trains to pass are located at Bergham (since December 2021, previously at Leonding), Hitzing (Dörnbach), Thürnau, Alkoven, Eferding, Prambachkirchen, Waizenkirchen, Niederspaching, Peuerbach and Neumarkt. There are freight sidings at Alkoven, Eferding, Waizenkirchen and Neumarkt. Roads and paths cross the track on the level 109 times in total. About a quarter of these level crossings are protected by flashing lights. Engineering structures include, besides the station buildings at Leonding, Alkoven, Eferding and Peuerbach, two road underpasses and four road overbridges. Four larger watercourses are crossed by bridges or culverts. The structures built when the two lines opened are still largely in their original condition.

Track maintenance is carried out by dedicated permanent-way gangs.

=== Electrical equipment ===
Originally, the alternating current generated by the Traunfall power station was fed via a 25,000 V line to the substation at Niederspaching. This in turn supplied three rotary-converter substations that produced the direct current for train operation. All three converter stations were of identical design.

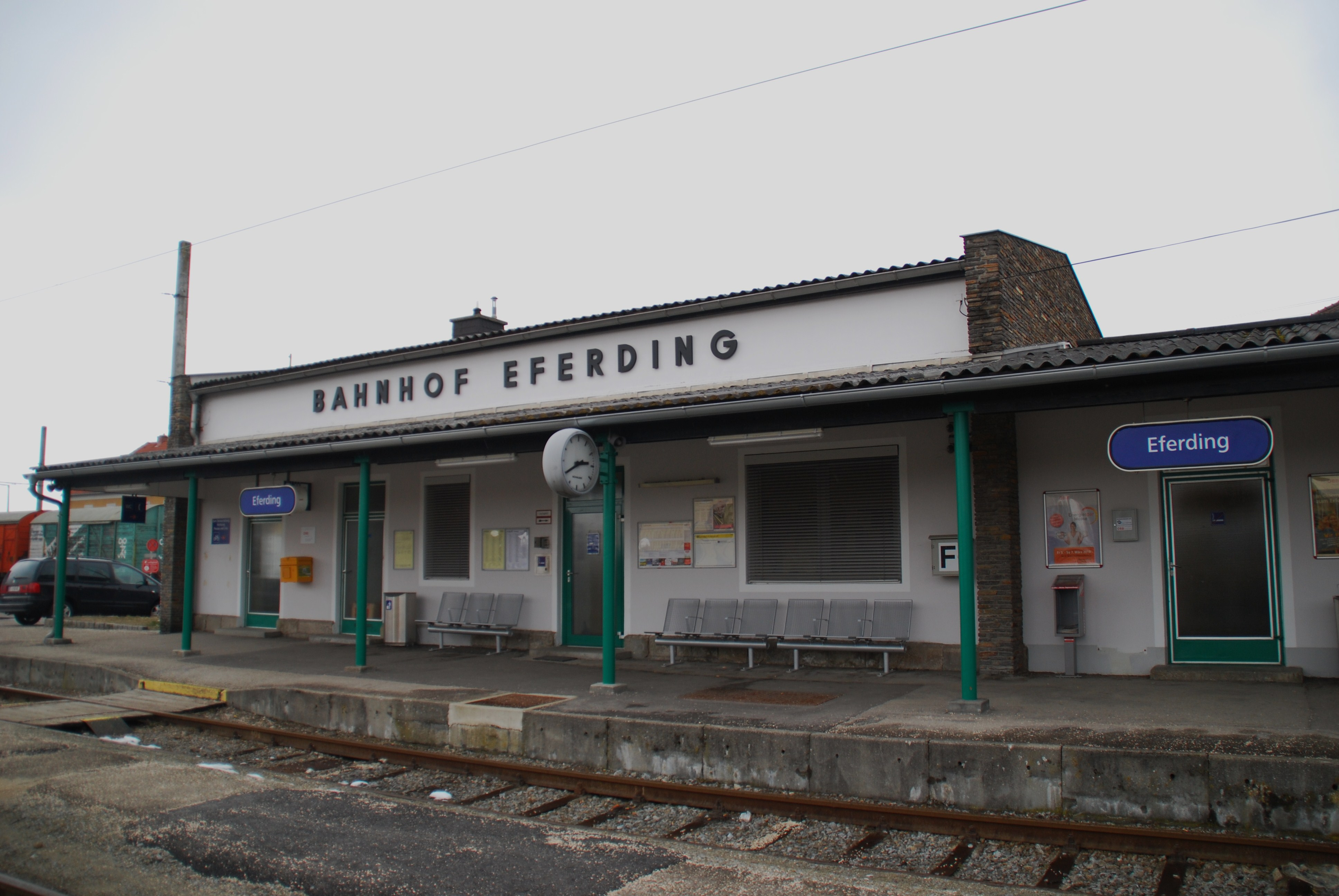
Eferding station

The original overhead line consisted of hard-drawn copper with a cross-section of 50 mm². It had double insulation to earth and was supported by a total of 1,450 wooden masts. In 1929 a substation was equipped with mercury-vapour glass rectifiers rated at 200 A. In 1942 the rectifier equipment was upgraded again. As these were still insufficiently powerful and voltage drops were frequent, between 1968 and 1973 the substations were fitted with silicon rectifier sets each rated at 1,000 A. The heavily worn contact wire was replaced by new grooved contact wire with 80 mm² cross-section, later by 100 mm² wire made of the now-standard copper-silver alloy.

The unprotected softwood masts erected when the line was built were replaced after the First World War with impregnated ones. After 1945 these masts were mounted on steel bases made from old rails. These steel bases have since been replaced by concrete footings. All masts now have aluminium tube arms and composite insulators.

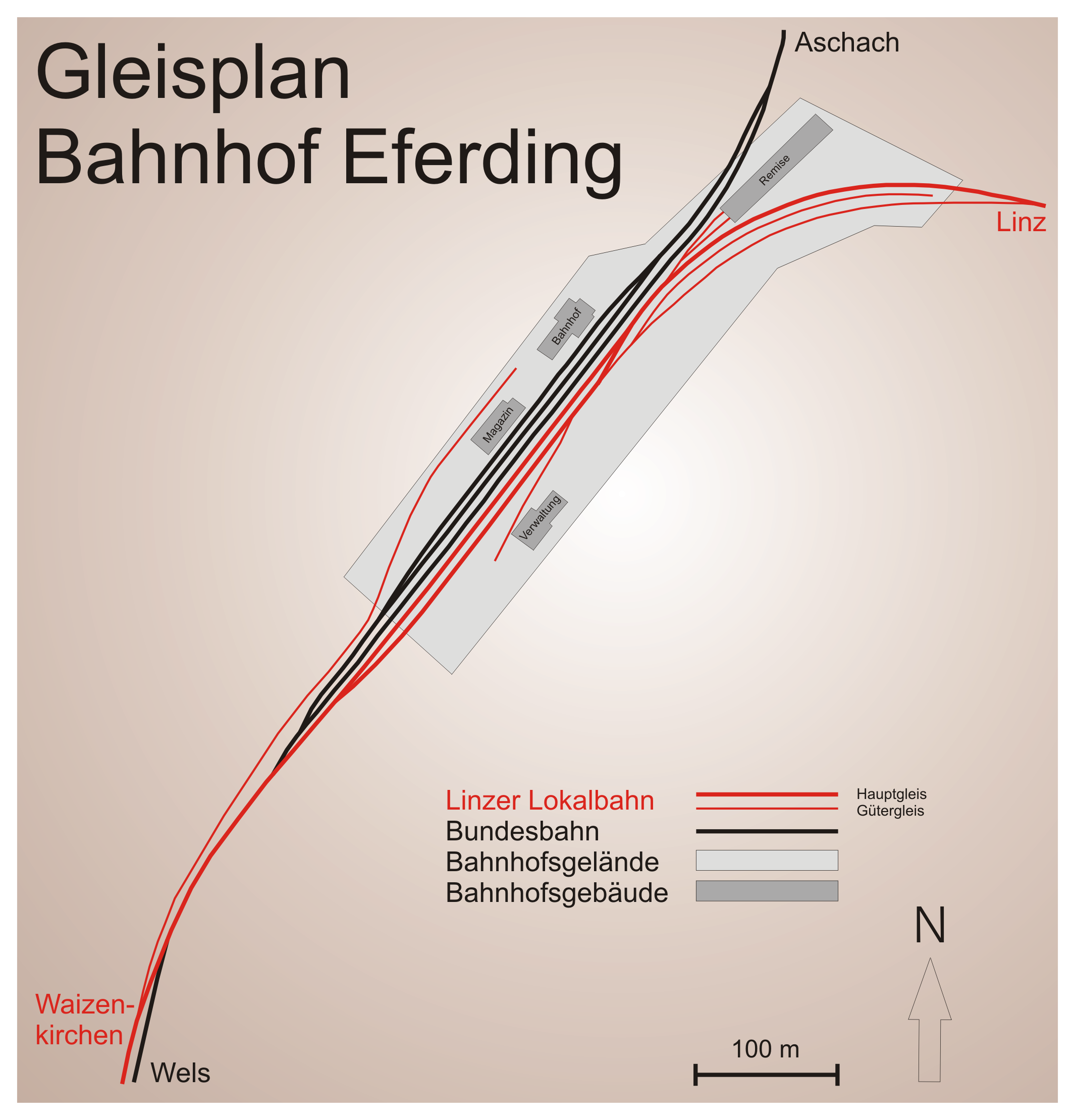
Track plan of Eferding station

Electricity for the operation of the local railway is supplied by Energie AG Oberösterreich.

== Timetable concept ==
Since November 2005, Linzer Lokalbahn trains have operated a line-specific clock-face timetable at certain times of day, mainly in the afternoons. This provides an exact 30-minute interval for arrivals in Linz, and usually an alternating 28–32-minute interval in the opposite direction. Crossings at Alkoven that take place between minutes 28 and 29 correspond to the symmetrical minute common in Central Europe. Depending on demand, the basic interval on weekdays is 30–60 minutes on the Linz–Eferding section, 30–90 minutes on Linz–Peuerbach, and 120 minutes on Waizenkirchen–Neumarkt, with short connections to ÖBB services at Neumarkt. During peak hours (mornings towards Linz, and around 14:00 and 17:00 towards Eferding) a 15-minute headway is provided. The same intervals apply in the opposite directions.

Journey time from Linz to Eferding is 40 minutes, to Peuerbach 82 minutes, and – with a change at Niederspaching station (municipality of Waizenkirchen) – to Neumarkt 92 minutes. This gives an average speed of 35 km/h over the full Linz–Neumarkt route. Before the 2013 timetable change, changing trains at Waizenkirchen or Niederspaching required 20 minutes; since then no extra time is needed, as trains either depart simultaneously or no change is required at all.

Since the 2013 timetable change, LILO trains have departed Linz Hauptbahnhof at minutes 19 and 49; since 2014 at minutes 20 and 50. This clock-face pattern is maintained at all times except the shoulders of the day; on weekends (hourly service) only the minute-50 departures operate.

Between 11:50 and 18:20 a 30-minute interval operates between Linz and Peuerbach: trains leaving at minute 20 run to Peuerbach, those at minute 50 to Neumarkt-Kallham, with a connection at Niederspaching to a Peuerbach-bound train.

The former REX services (previously departing at 13:32/15:32/17:32) were discontinued in 2013; LILO trains now stop at all stops on request.

In December 2016, with the introduction of the Upper Austria S-Bahn, the timetable was adjusted to the S-Bahn system so that all S-Bahn lines arrive at and depart from Linz Hauptbahnhof at roughly the same time to facilitate interchange.

From 1 January 2024 the Aschach Railway will be taken over by the state-owned Schiene Oberösterreich GmbH. The Eferding–Aschach section is to be electrified and integrated into the Linzer Lokalbahn network.

== Economic situation ==
Goods transported (1978–2005) (Note: Statistics on traffic volumes of the Stern & Hafferl railways.)

The main source of income for the Linzer Lokalbahn is currently passenger traffic. Goods are transported only rarely; only the haulage of sugar beets generates additional revenue. Since the railway no longer owns its own freight wagons, wagons are hired each year for these beet trains. Special trains with historic vehicles are also operated regularly. ET 22.105 is available at any time for charter with a supporting programme, photo stops and a depot tour.

On the Linz–Waizenkirchen section trains are generally staffed with conductors, although driver-only operation is being trialled. The upper section (Waizenkirchen, Neumarkt, Peuerbach) is regularly operated driver-only.

In 2007 the LILO employed a total of 103 staff. Since 1999 the railway has been part of the Linz transport association (LVV) (since 2005 a member of the Upper Austria Transport Association (OÖVV)) and thereby receives appropriate compensation for its costs.

Revenue from roughly 2 million fare-paying passengers (2016) and 70,000 tonnes of freight (2005) falls far short of covering operating costs. The municipalities along the line, especially the cities of Linz and Eferding, have provided substantial subsidies for many years. Other neighbouring municipalities do not always pay their full contribution, leading to ongoing political debate and difficulties with necessary investment.

Nevertheless, the railway's operation is secured year after year through the granted subsidies.

At the city council meeting of 31 March 2004 the city of Linz granted the Linzer Lokalbahn AG a subsidy of €290,690 per year for 2004–2006 to maintain operations, plus €1,125,000 per year for 2004–2007 for the purchase of six additional multiple units, and a further €109,310 in 2004 as advance financing for the vehicles. In the same meeting the city agreed to pass on the expected state grant of €545,000 per year for 2007 and 2008.

Passengers carried (1978–2005)

== Passenger number development ==
In 1978 the Linzer Lokalbahn still carried just over 1.6 million passengers on the Linz–Eferding–Waizenkirchen route; in the following decade the figure fell steadily to less than half, mainly due to an ageing fleet and unattractive journey times. Only the introduction of more comfortable ex-Köln-Bonner Eisenbahnen units in 1987 and the resulting shorter journey times reversed the decline. It took another twelve years until passenger numbers in 1998 approached the earlier levels again. Around the turn of the millennium the figure stabilised at 1.6 million passengers per year. (Note: Stern & Hafferl Verkehrs-GmbH, Marketing and Sales Department.) Numbers then rose again, and in 2016 the two-million mark was exceeded.

== Bibliography ==
- Karl Zwirchmayr: 75 Jahre Linzer Lokalbahn, Linzer Lokalbahn AG, 1987.
- Helmut Weis: Die Unternehmung Stern & Hafferl II. Bahn im Bild, Band 26, 1982.
- Ludger Kenning: Eisenbahnhandbuch Österreich. Verlag Kenning, Nordhorn 1992, ISBN 3-927587-08-7, pp. 77–78.
- Helmut Marchetti: Stern & Hafferl – Visionen mit Tradition. GEG Werbung, Gmunden 2003, ISBN 3-9501763-0-6.
- Andreas Christopher, Gunter Mackinger, Peter Wegenstein: Privatbahnen in Österreich. Motorbuch Verlag, 1997, ISBN 3-613-71052-8.
