= Aspöck Systems =

Austrian vehicle lighting supplier

- Type: GmbH
- Industry: Automotive lighting
- Founded: September 1977
- Founder: Felix Aspöck
- Headquarters: Peuerbach, Austria
- Key people: Karl Aspöck (managing director)
- Revenue: EUR 191 million (2021/22)
- Number of employees: 1,550 (worldwide) 332 (in Austria) (2022)
- Website: www.aspoeck.com/en

Aspöck Systems is an internationally active supplier of the vehicle industry in the field of lighting technology based in Peuerbach, Upper Austria. The family-owned company manufactures lighting systems for cars, truck and car trailers, agricultural and construction machinery, caravans and motorcycles in Europe.

== History and structure ==
Felix Aspöck founded the company as Fahrzeugelektrik F. Aspöck in September 1977 in the basement of his home in Peuerbach. The first major customers were companies from Upper Austria, such as Pöttinger and Brantner, followed by companies from southern Germany.

In 1981, the company set up its first company building, employing ten employees. In 1986 the construction was tripled in size.

In 1988, the company initiated international expansion, by founding Aspöck Germany. This was followed by introducing products for new business segments.

In 1996, Aspöck Systems introduced its first complete lighting box, the Multipoint I. At the turn of the millennium, Aspöck Systems continued to expand internationally, establishing sales locations in Brazil, France, Italy, Sweden and United Kingdom.

In 2002, Aspöck Systems further expanded operations in Brazil. For this purpose, the company founded, together with previous Italian sales partner Pagg, the joint venture Aspöck do Brasil LTDA. This subsidiary produces and sells lighting systems for the Brazilian market.

In 2006, Karl Aspöck, son of founder Felix Aspöck, took over the management of Aspöck Systems, being the second-generation head of the family business. One year later, previous supplier and partner Fabrilcar from Portugal was acquired and became part of the company as Aspöck Portugal S.A.

in 2008. This secured a significant production volume, and with two expansions in the following years, the site became the largest production facility in the group.

In 2014, Aspöck Systems entered a cooperation with Volkswagen for the manufacture and supply of combination rear lamps for the Volkswagen Caddy. Volkswagen manufactures the Caddy at its Polish plant in Poznań. Therefore, the group's Polish subsidiary Aspöck Automotive Polska Sp. z o.o. expanded its sales office in Kluczbork in southwestern Poland with a production plant.

In 2016, the production facility was completed, with a combined warehouse, production, and office space area of 4,400 m^{2} (47,400 ft^{2}). In 2021, expansions started at the production and logistics area at the Kluczbork plant to almost double the operation area.

== Corporate structure ==
Aspöck Systems is a group consisting of Aspöck Systems GmbH, Aspöck Portugal S.A., Aspöck Automotive Polska Sp. z o.o. and Aspöck do Brasil LTDA. The companies are owned by the Aspöck Privatstiftung (Aspöck Private Foundation). The foundation is intended to ensure operations of the company and the associated real estate and is also the majority owner of other associated companies that are connected with the Aspöck family. Karl Aspöck runs the family business in second generation.

Aspöck Systems makes the majority of its sales with lighting equipment for towed vehicles. A growing market is the automotive sector. in the fiscal year 2021/22 Aspöck Systems GmbH generated revenues of EUR 191 million. The Aspöck group employs 1,550 people worldwide and Aspöck Systems GmbH employs around 330 people (2022).

=== Sites ===
Aspöck Systems, as well as their strategic hub and the logistics center, are based in Peuerbach, Upper Austria. The company produces in Austria, Portugal and Poland as well as in Brazil. Production takes place primarily in Oliveira de Azeméis, Portugal, and in Kluczbork, Poland. Subsidiaries in Brazil, France, Germany, Italy, Spain, Sweden, Turkey and United Kingdom support international sales activities.

==== Headquarters in Peuerbach ====
Since its foundation, the company has been based in Peuerbach. In 1981, the first company building was established. Until 2022, the site in Peuerbach was expanded nine times. Among the various expansions, especially the expansion in 2009 was a cornerstone for the company's intralogistics. It included the construction of the automated high-bay warehouse with a square footage of 3,000 m^{2} (32,300 ft^{2}), making Upper Austria the logistics hub of the Aspöck Group since then.

Further, in 2013, the warehouse was converted to the advanced warehouse management system SAP WM. This allowed to secure large stocks for just-in-time production of all segments the company serves. Following this, Aspöck Systems together with SAP developed an automation feature that links the warehouse, logistics and store floor in such a way that each order triggers a follow-up order, while at the same time buffering the orders before production and not immediately assigning them to a fixed production location. Instead, each of the orders is assigned two dates: the earliest time at which it must be processed and the latest. Since implementation, Aspöck has reduced throughput times by an average of 25 percent.

Throughout 2019, Aspöck built a new three-story administrative building in Peuerbach. In 2022, two new floors for the incoming goods department and the picking warehouse were completed. They each offer an additional 2,200 m^{2} (23,700 ft^{2}) of space over a length of almost 45 meters.

== Products ==
The manufacturer produces complete lighting systems and luminaires for agricultural and construction machinery, for motorcycles as well as caravans and special vehicles. Part of the lighting systems is also the cabling, for which the plug-in system Aspöck Stecker System (ASS) was developed. Since 2018, Aspöck Systems has been developing and producing encapsulated LED strips for vehicles. These are also used in industry, private households or hotels.

== Bibliography ==
- Falkner, August (1995). Peuerbach – Die Stadt im gemeinsamen Lebensraum mit den Gemeinden Bruck-Waasen und Steegen [Peuerbach – The city in a common living space with the communities of Bruck-Waasen and Steegen] (in German). Peuerbach: Peuerbach, Gemeinde.
