= Peuerbach =

- Municipality
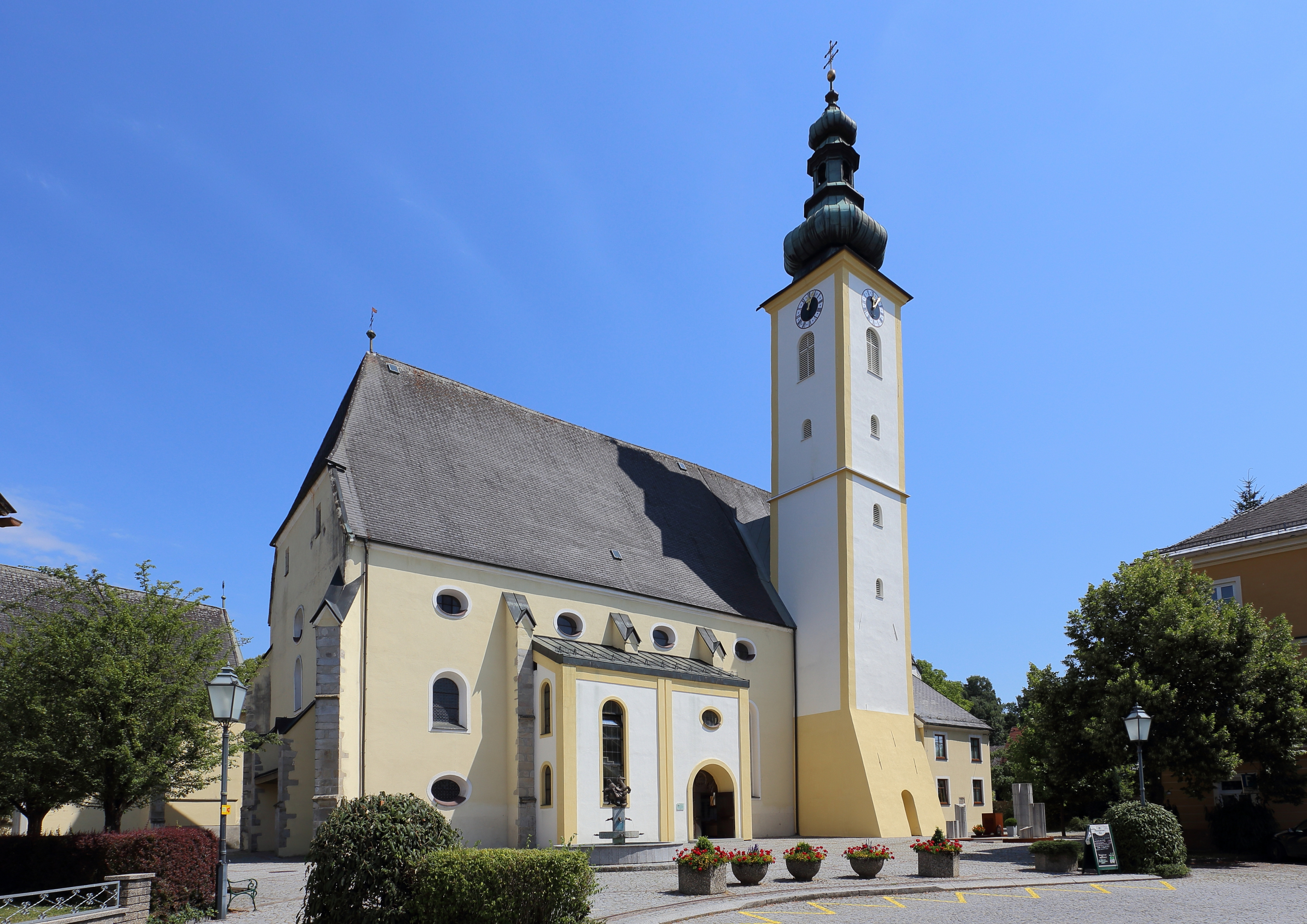

- Coat of arms

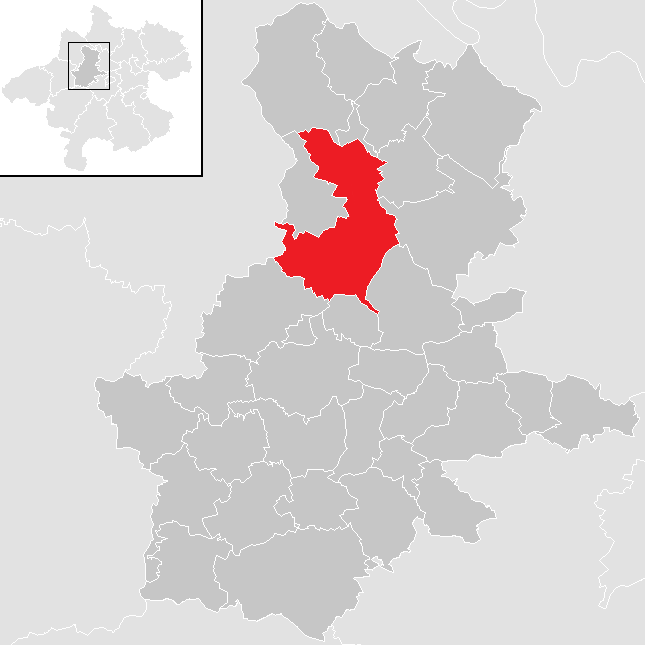
- Location in the district

- Location within Austria
- Coordinates: 48°20′44″N 13°46′27″E
- Country: Austria
- State: Upper Austria
- District: Grieskirchen

Government
  - Mayor: Wolfgang Oberlehner (ÖVP)

Area
  - Total: 39.4 km^{2} (15.2 sq mi)
- Elevation: 390 m (1,280 ft)

Population (2018-01-01)
  - Total: 4,483
  - Density: 114/km^{2} (295/sq mi)
- Time zone: UTC+1 (CET)
  - Summer (DST): UTC+2 (CEST)
- Postal code: 4722
- Area code: 07276
- Vehicle registration: GR
- Website: www.peuerbach.at

Peuerbach is a town in Austria, in Grieskirchen (district) in the Austrian state of Upper Austria.

On 6 November 2016 there was a vote on whether Peuerbach would be merged with the neighbouring municipalities of Bruck-Waasen and Steegen. The majority of the inhabitants of Peuerbach and Bruck-Waasen voted in favour, the majority of the inhabitants of Steegen against it. On 1 January 2018, Peuerbach merged with Bruck-Waasen, but maintained the name Stadtgemeinde Peuerbach.

Aspöck Systems is based here.

== Population ==
Historical population
Year	Pop.	±%
1869	1,777	—
1880	1,731	−2.6%
1890	1,838	+6.2%
1900	1,775	−3.4%
1910	1,891	+6.5%
1923	1,852	−2.1%
1934	2,075	+12.0%
1939	1,934	−6.8%
1951	2,234	+15.5%
1961	2,105	−5.8%
1971	2,161	+2.7%
1981	2,024	−6.3%
1991	2,098	+3.7%
2001	2,224	+6.0%
2011	2,138	−3.9%
2018	4,483	+109.7%

== Personalities ==
- Georg von Peuerbach (1423-1461), famous astronomer
- Klaus Klaffenböck, sidecar racing world champion
- Doris Schmidauer, First Lady of Austria.
