= Neukirchen am Walde =

- Municipality
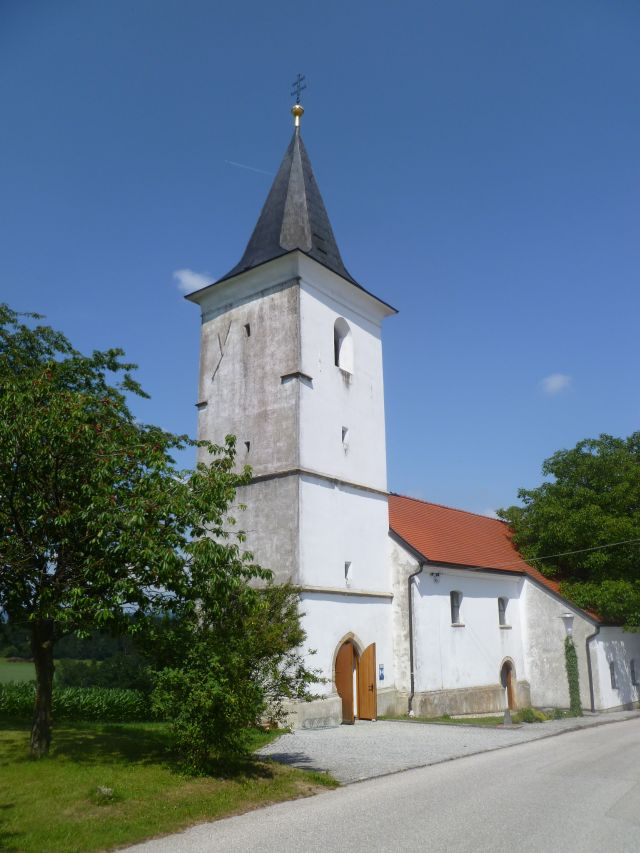

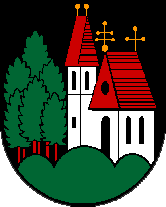
- Coat of arms

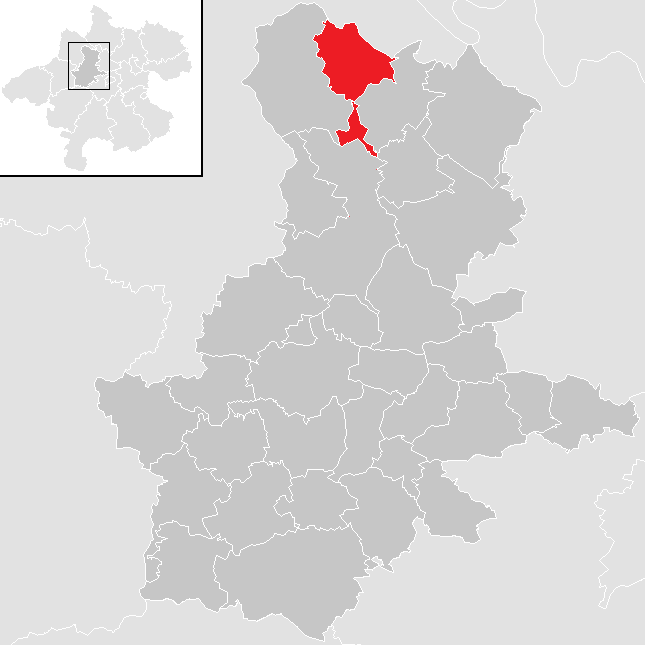
- Location in the district

- Location within Austria
- Coordinates: 48°24′21″N 13°46′55″E
- Country: Austria
- State: Upper Austria
- District: Grieskirchen

Government
  - Mayor: Kurt Kaiserseder (ÖVP)

Area
  - Total: 15.84 km^{2} (6.12 sq mi)
- Elevation: 555 m (1,821 ft)

Population (2018-01-01)
  - Total: 1,633
  - Density: 103.1/km^{2} (267.0/sq mi)
- Time zone: UTC+1 (CET)
  - Summer (DST): UTC+2 (CEST)
- Postal code: 4724
- Area code: 07278
- Vehicle registration: GR
- Website: www.neukirchen-walde.ooe.gv.at

Neukirchen am Walde is a municipality in the district of Grieskirchen in the Austrian state of Upper Austria.

== Geography ==
Neukirchen lies in the Hausruckviertel. About 21 percent of the municipality is forest, and 70 percent is farmland.
