= Linz =

- Statutory city
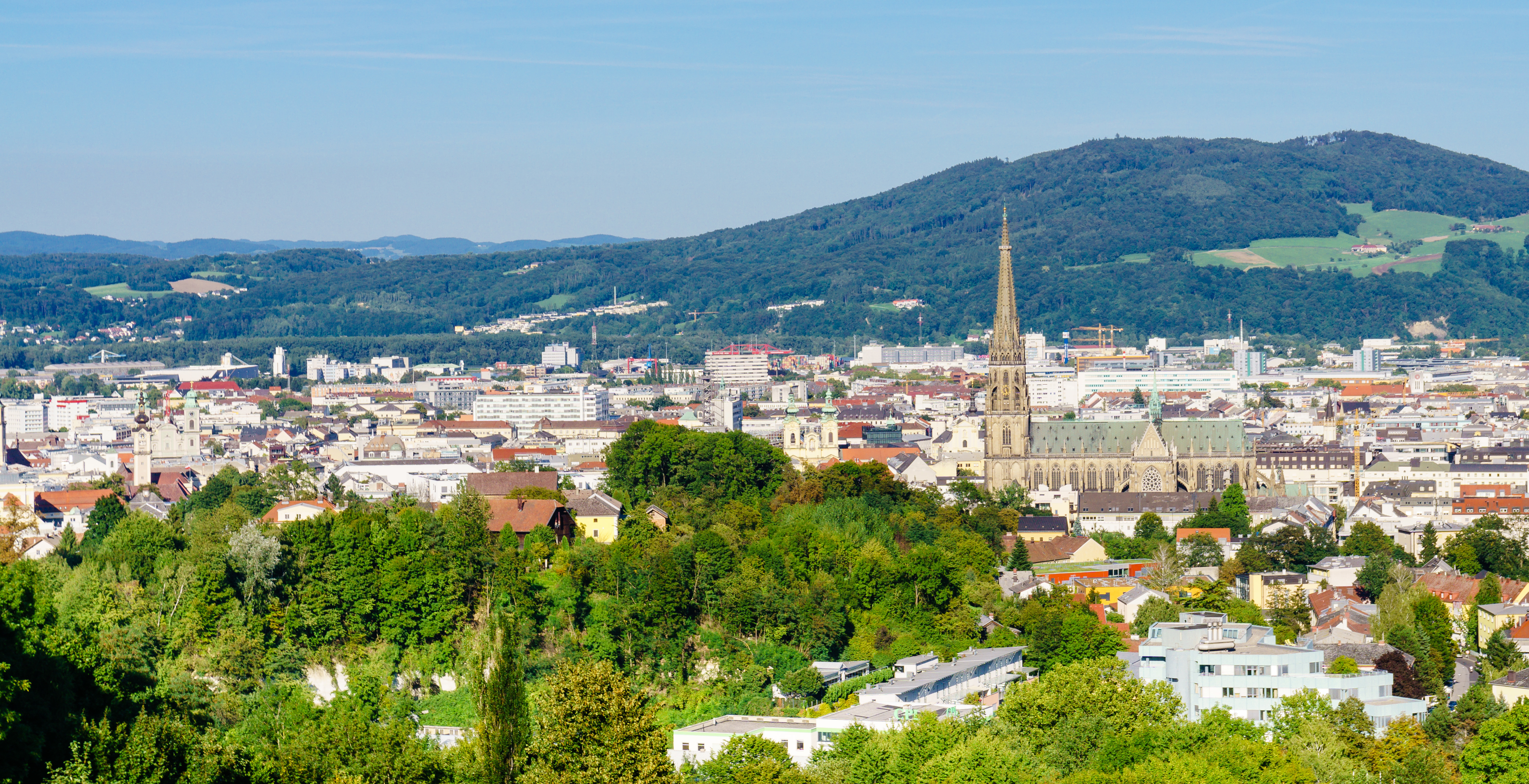
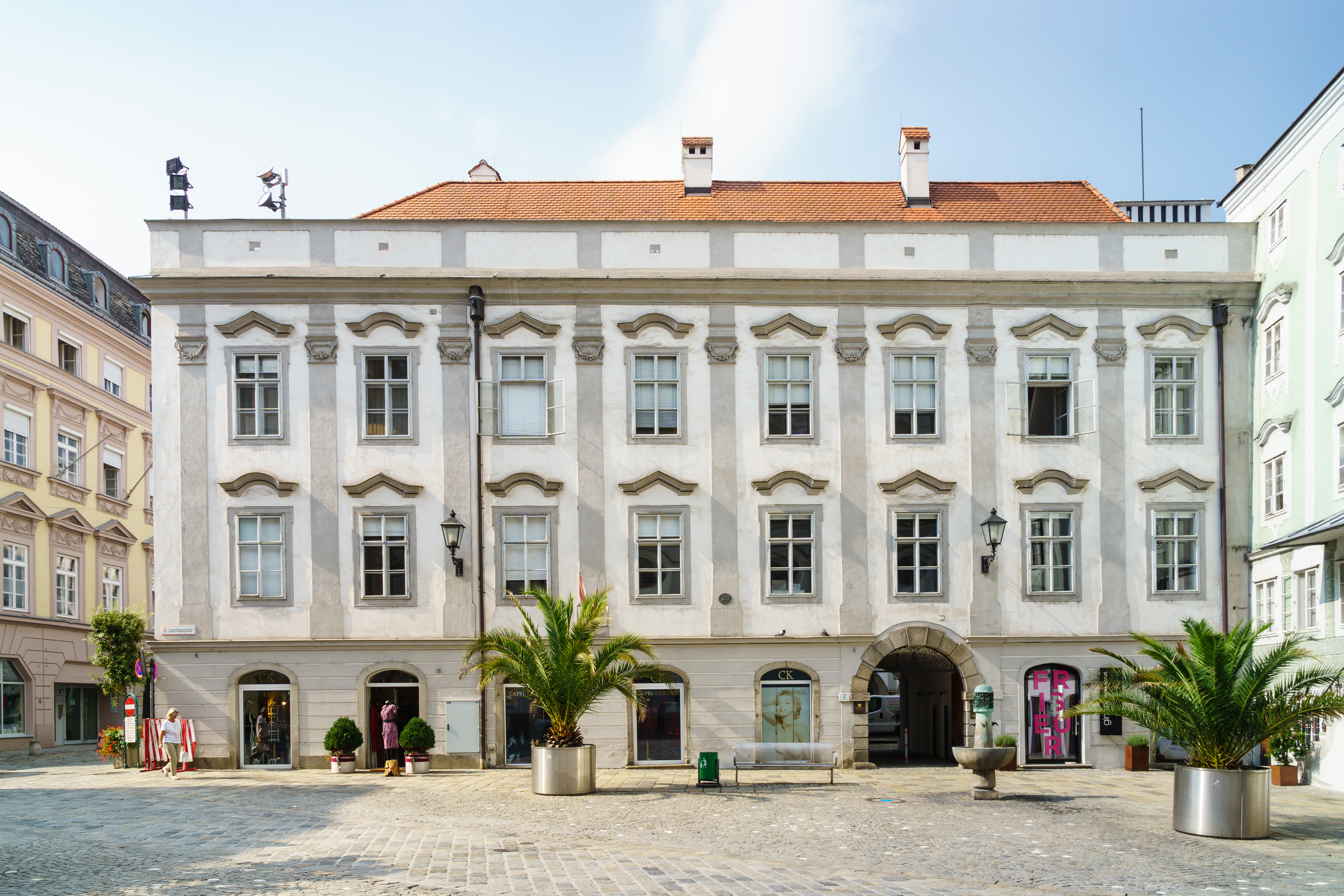
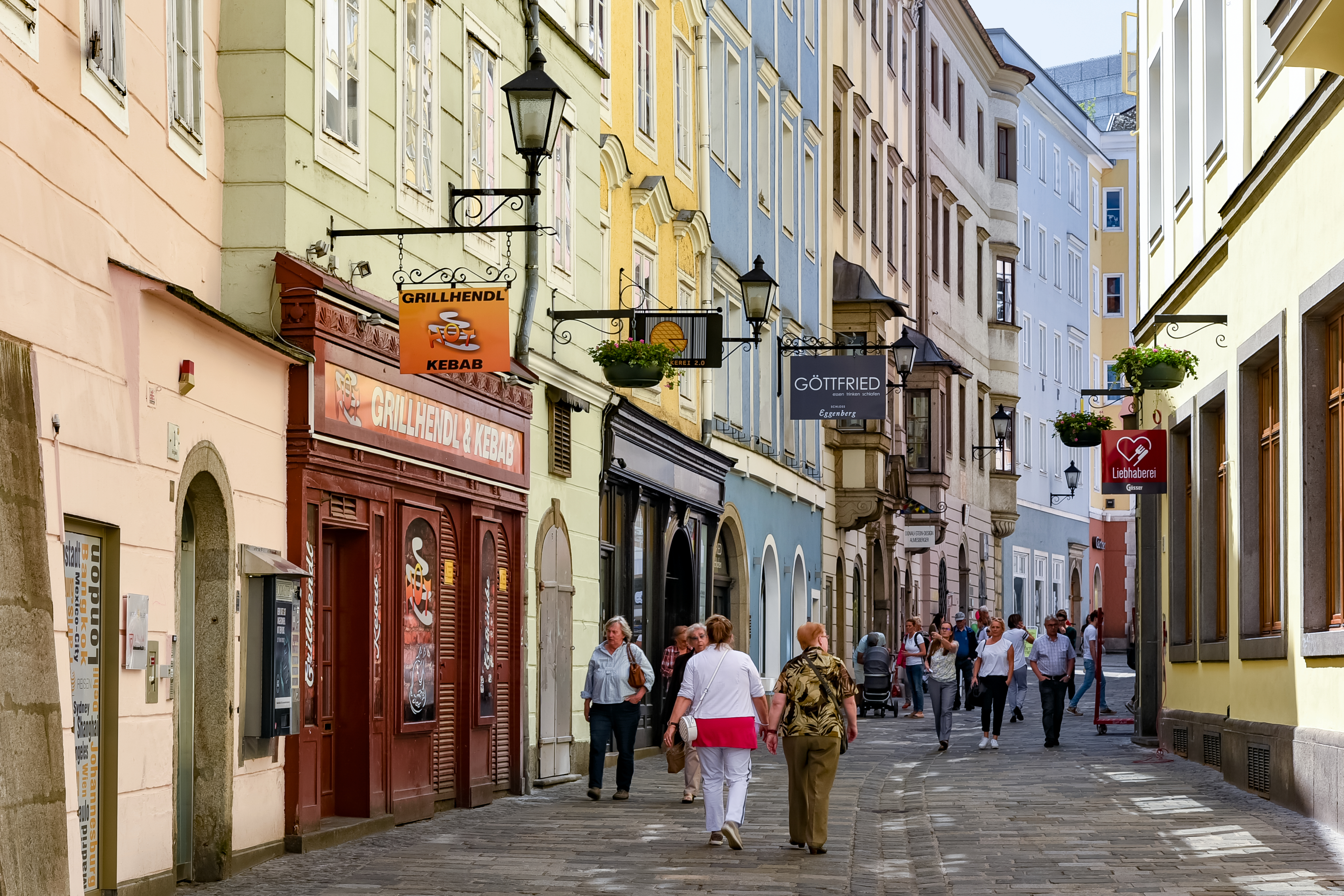
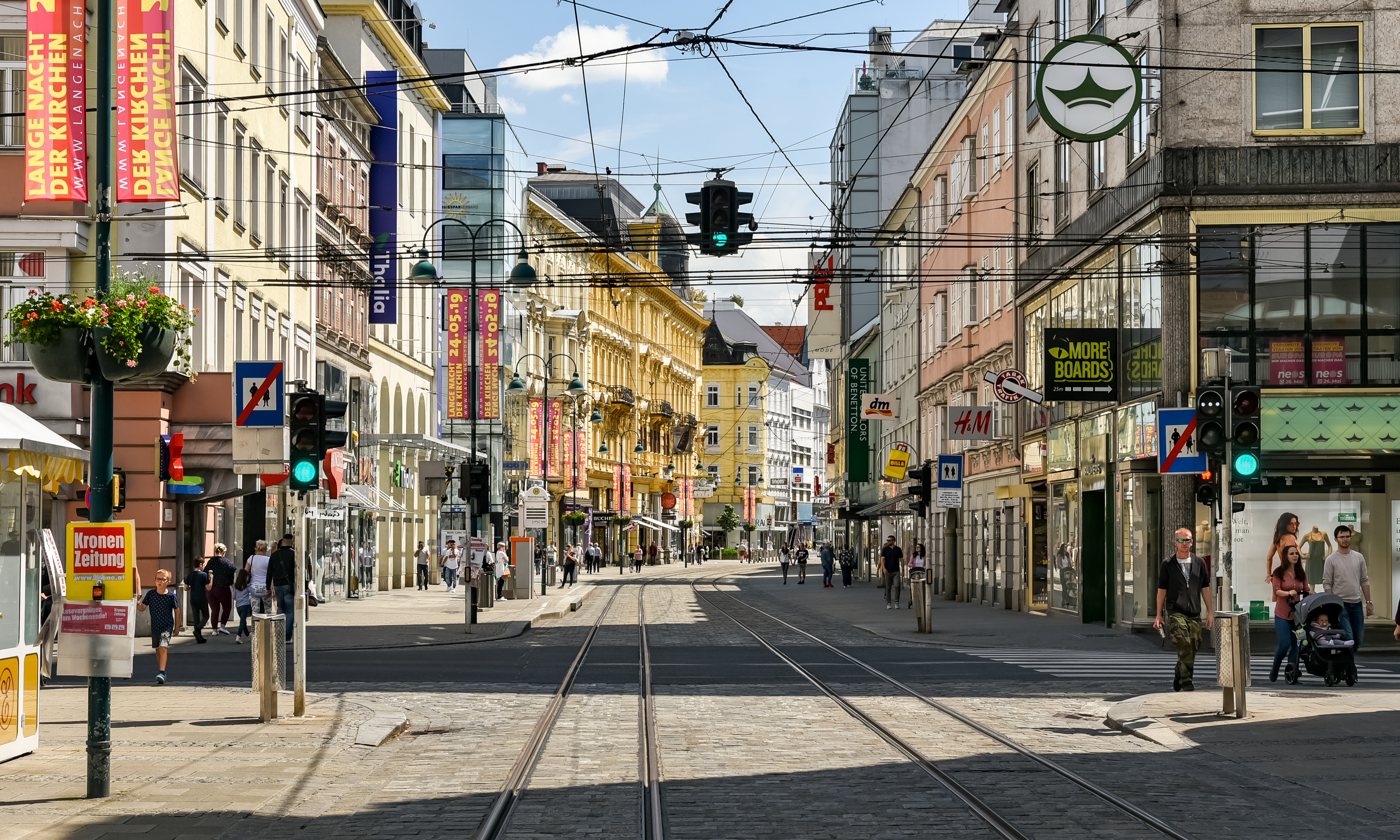
- Clockwise from top: general view with the New Cathedral, pedestrian area in the city centre, Landstraße, Altstadt

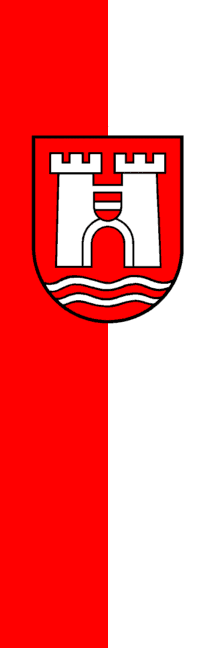
- Flag Coat of arms Brandmark

- The city’s territory, highlighted on a map of Upper Austria, with the borders of the surrounding districts visible

- Pinpointed location within Austria
- Coordinates: 48°18′21″N 14°17′11″E
- Country: Austria
- State: Upper Austria
- District: Statutory city

Government
  - Mayor: Dietmar Prammer (SPÖ)

Area
  - Statutory city: 95.99 km^{2} (37.06 sq mi)
- Elevation: 266 m (873 ft)

Population
  - Metro: 271,234
- Time zone: UTC+1 (CET)
  - Summer (DST): UTC+2 (CEST)
- Postal code: 4010, 402x, 4030, 404x
- Area code: 0732 (also 070 until 12 May 2014)
- Vehicle registration: L
- Website: https://www.linz.at

Linz (/lɪnts/ LIHNTS; Austrian German: [lɪnts]; Czech: Linec [ˈlɪnɛt͡s]) is the capital of Upper Austria and third-largest city in Austria. Located on the river Danube, the city is in the far north of Austria, 30 km (19 mi) south of the border with Czechia. As of 1 January 2024, the city has a population of 214,064. It is the seventh-largest of all cities on the river Danube.

The area of present-day Linz was the site of the Roman settlement of Lentia. Linz was first documented in medieval sources and developed as a commercial and administrative centre within the Duchy of Austria and later the Habsburg monarchy. During the 19th and 20th centuries, the city underwent significant industrialisation, including the establishment and expansion of steel and chemical production facilities. The city's economy subsequently diversified, with services, higher education, and research institutions becoming important components of local economic activity.

Linz is home to several universities, museums, and annual festivals. In 2009, the city was designated a European Capital of Culture.

== History ==
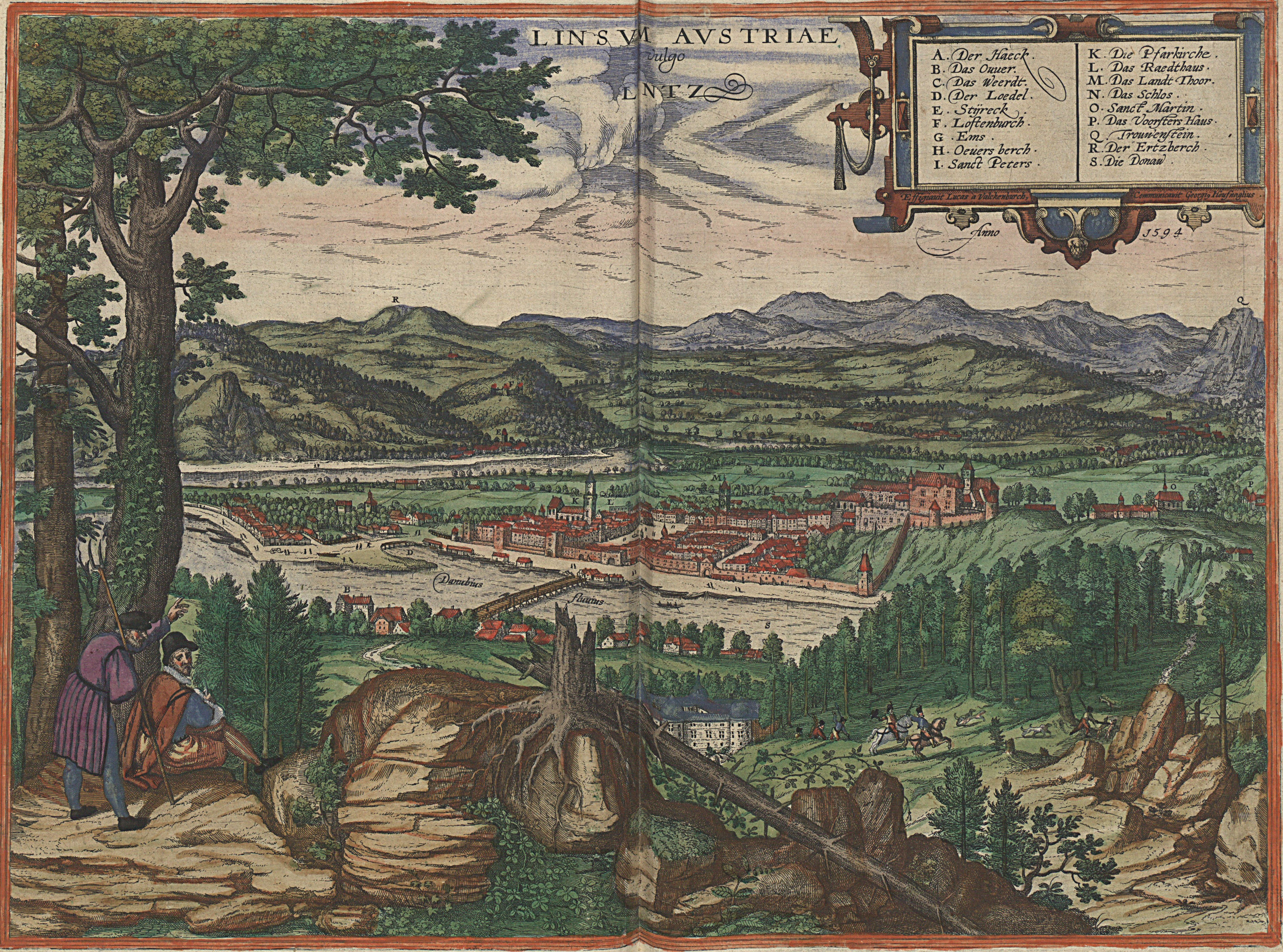
A depiction of the town in 1594

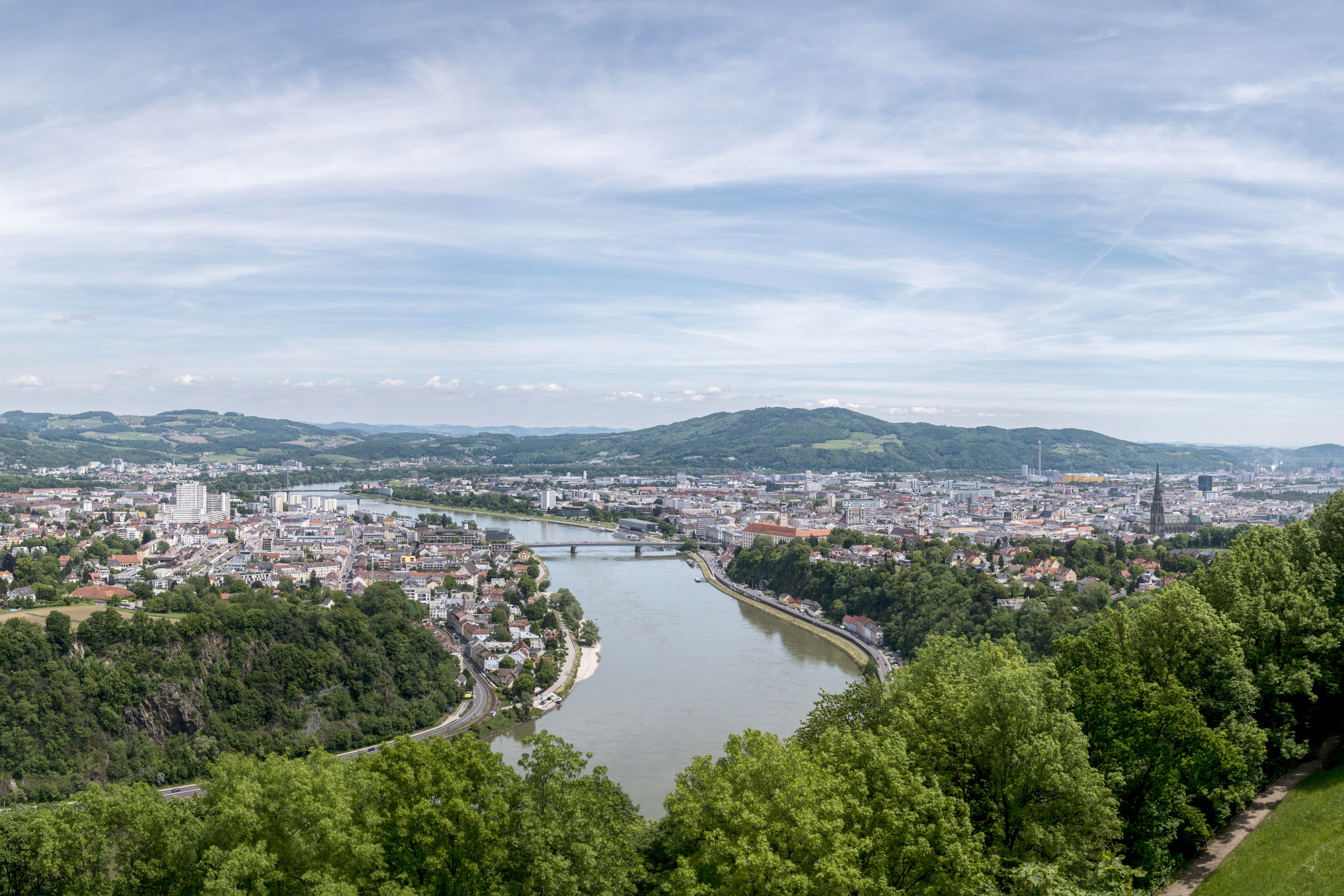
The central part of the town

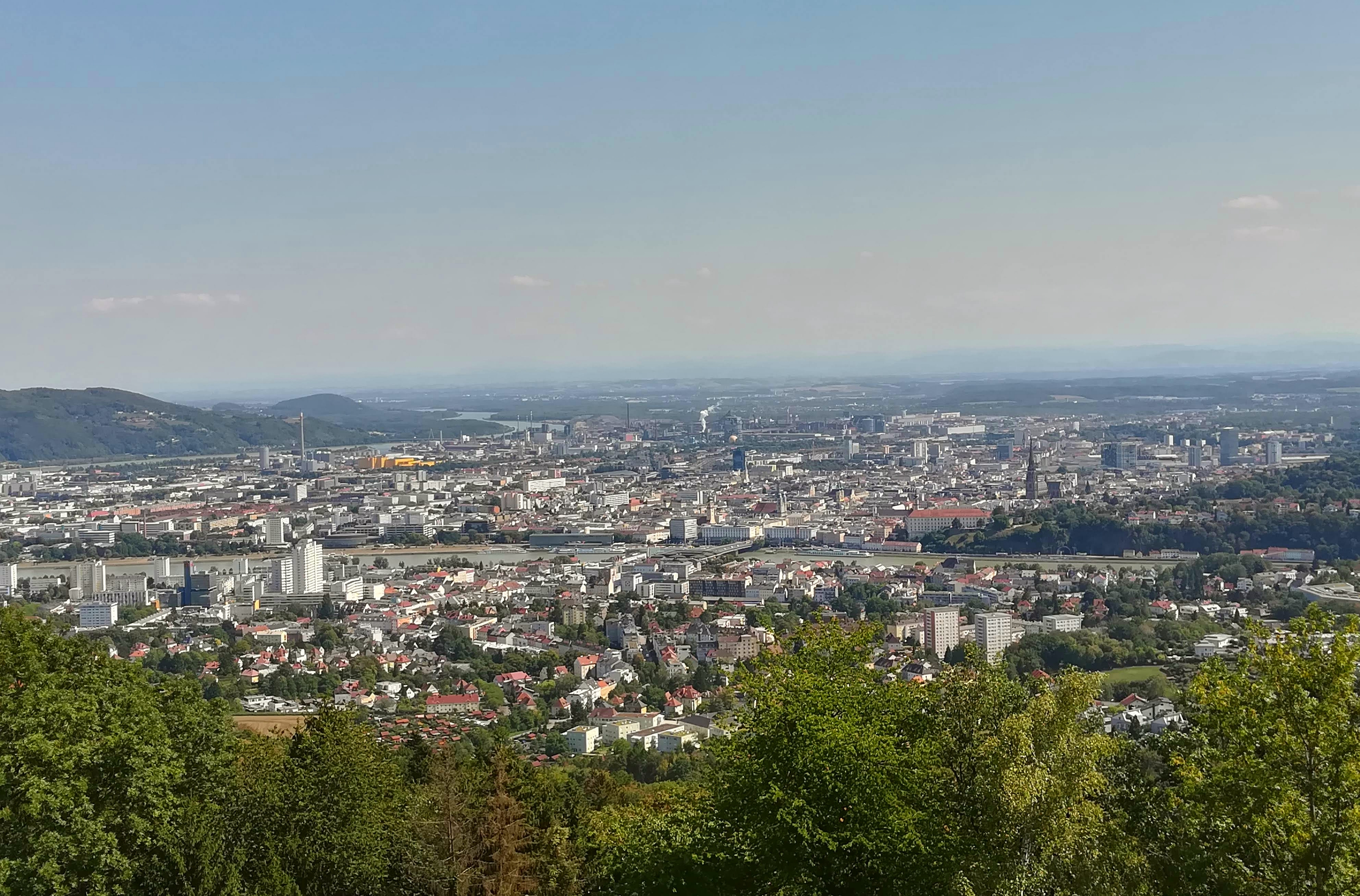
View from Pöstlingberg

Linz originated as a Roman fort named Lentia, established in the first century. The name reflects its location at a bend in the Danube (Celtic root lentos = "bendable"). This strategic position on the river made it the first Roman fort in the Noricum region, protecting a vital transportation route.

The name "Linz" in its present form was first documented in 799.

Linz was mentioned as a fortified city in 1236 and was granted city rights in 1324.

Johannes Kepler spent several years of his life in the city teaching mathematics. On 15 May 1618 he discovered Kepler's laws of planetary motion. The local public university Johannes Kepler University Linz is named for him.

The Oeconomische Encyclopädie (also simply known as the Krünitz), with the entry about Linz being written around 1800, describes the city as well built and fortified and its economy as growing, partially because of its location on the Danube and the connection to routes to Hungary and Vienna. At that time, the city had a population of 16,000–17,000. Major industries were the productions of gunpowder, iron, steel, salt, and firewood. The wool industry was particularly important: a wool manufactory, established in 1672, was the biggest in then-Austria, or rather, the Austrian states. It was nationalized in 1754. Plans, made in 1770, of selling it to a tradesman were canceled. Although it kept production going, by the end of the 18th century its golden era was over. When the Krünitz entry was written, the manufactuary had a yearly revenue of 1.5 million Gulden and was generating 100,000 in profit and was employing around 30,000 people.

Anton Bruckner spent the years between 1855 and 1868 working as a local composer and organist in the Old Cathedral, Linz. The Brucknerhaus is named for him.

Adolf Hitler was born in Braunau am Inn (an Austrian town near the German border) and moved to Linz during his childhood. The notorious Holocaust bureaucrat Adolf Eichmann also spent his youth in Linz. Until the end of his life, Hitler considered Linz to be his hometown. Hitler effected the founding of the Bruckner Symphony Orchestra, which began presenting concerts in autumn 1943. His plan for one of the bell towers in Linz to play a theme from Bruckner's Fourth Symphony never came to pass.

During World War II Linz was a giant industrial complex in support of the Nazi war effort. Hermann Göring supervised the construction of the Voest complex, ultimately a gigantic construction site built by slave labour. The Mauthausen concentration camp was established to the east of Linz, but three Mauthausen sub-camps were within the Voest complex.

In addition to an ordnance depot Linz had a benzol plant which was bombed during the Oil Campaign of World War II. The city's confrontation with its Nazi past resulted in the renaming of many streets. In 1945, immediately after the end of the Nazi dictatorship, 39 streets in Linz were renamed, but from 1946 to 1987, only two streets were renamed. However, since 1988, 17 new traffic areas were named after victims of National Socialism or resistance fighters.

After the Second World War, Linz became part of the American occupation zone in Austria and underwent postwar reconstruction. During the following decades, the city developed into one of Austria's main economic centres. In 2009, Linz was designated a European Capital of Culture.

== Economy ==
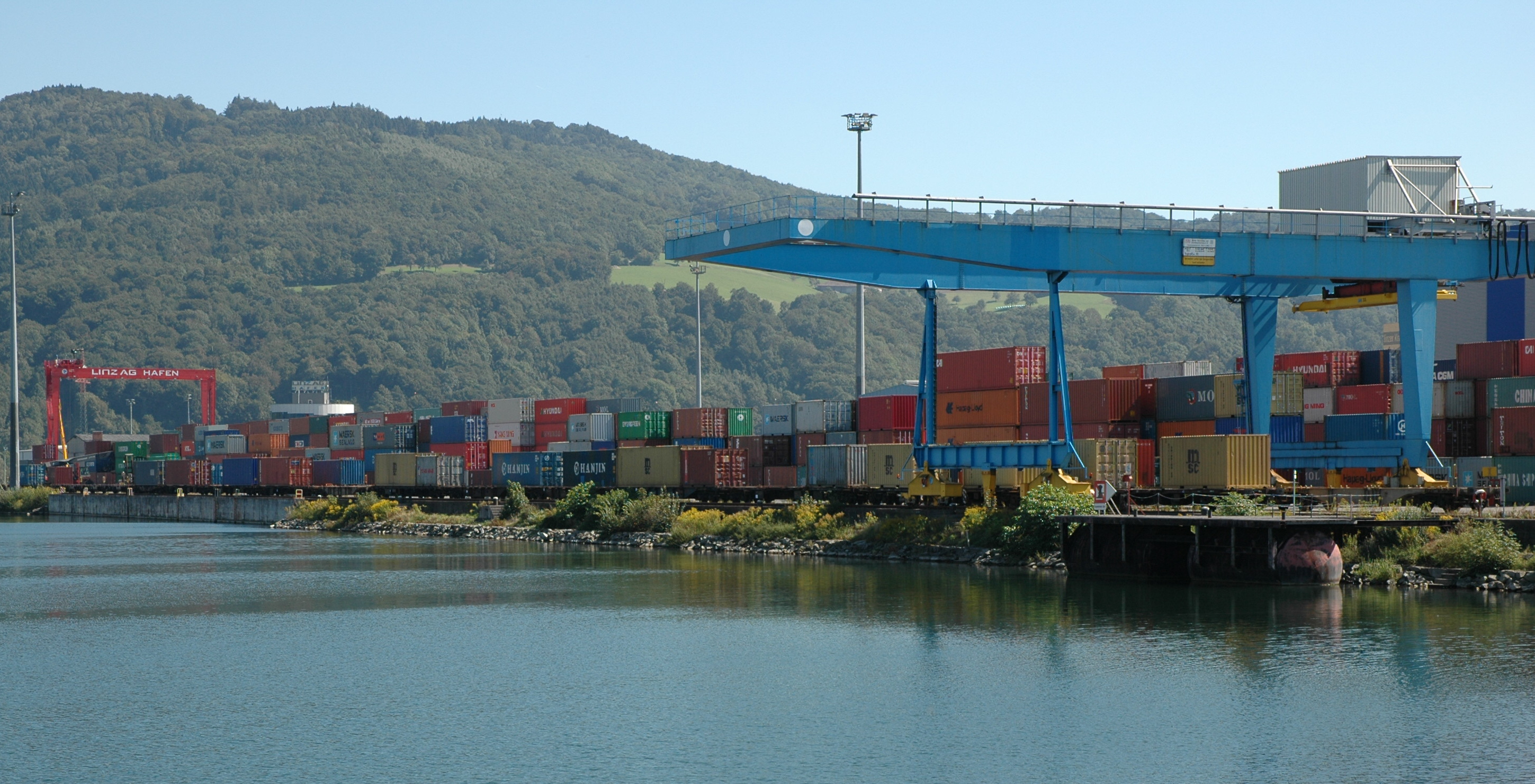
The container terminal at the harbour

Linz is one of the main economic centres of Austria. Voestalpine is a large technology and capital goods group, founded as the "Reichswerke Hermann Göring" during World War II. It is now known for basic oxygen steelmaking technique. The former "Chemie Linz" chemical group was split into several companies.

The Meeting Industry Report Austria (mira) ranks Linz as the third most important destination for congresses in Austria, with a 7.4 percent share of the total number of congresses, conferences and seminars held in Austria. Linz has more than 60 congress and event venues. With the Blue Meeting concept, the local tourism association has developed a conference format which focuses on individual needs of participants and adapts to the idea of green meetings, therefore supporting waste minimisation, energy efficiency, climate-neutral travel, as well as regional added value.

=== Waterfront and industry ===
Linz has 1 of 4 Austrian harbours on the Danube (österreichischen Donauhäfen). Manufacturing plants can be found along the waterfront. The economic importance of Linz was founded over centuries in trade. Large industrial enterprises are still located in Linz nowadays, for example Voestalpine AG.

=== Shopping ===
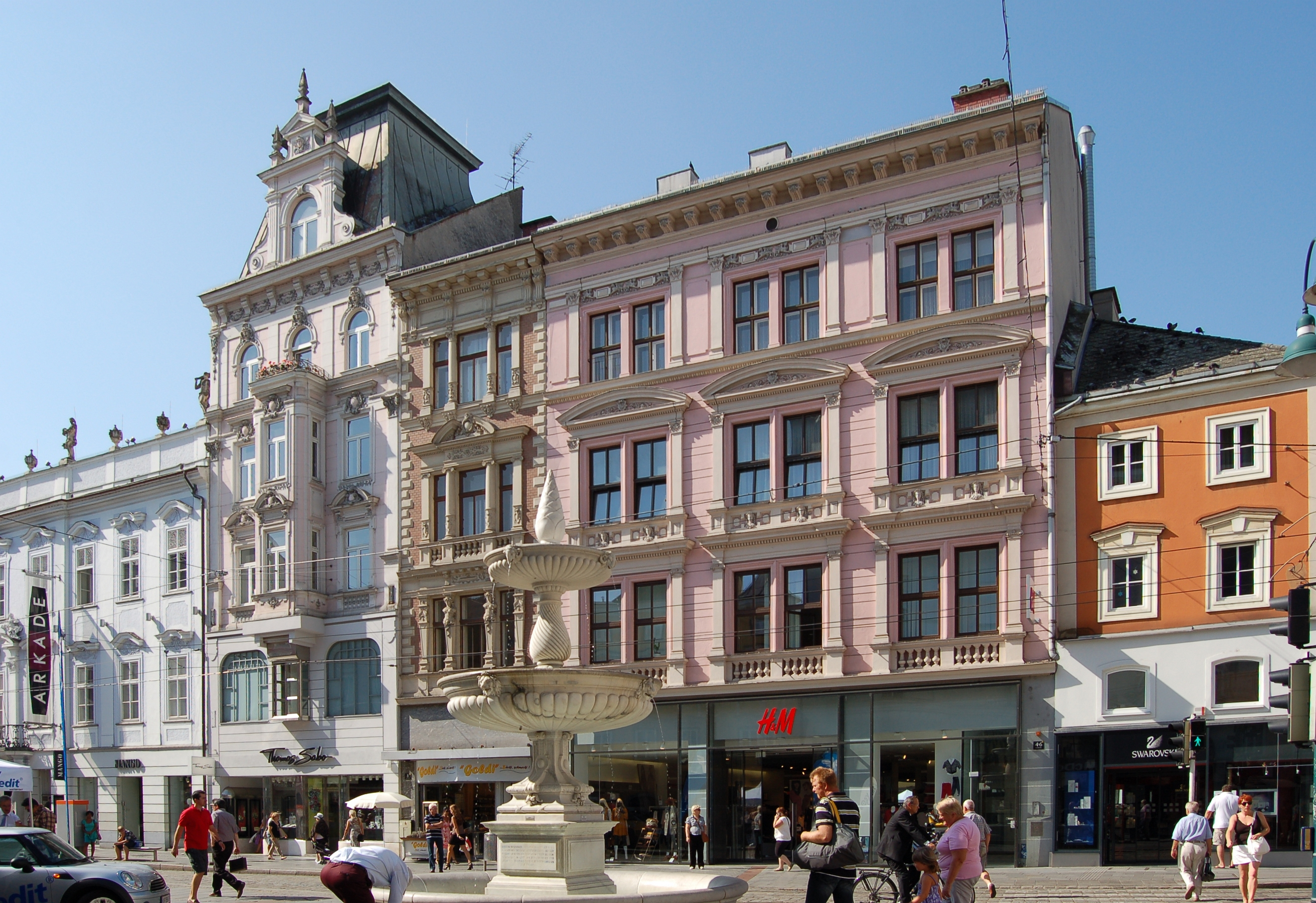
Landstraße, Taubenmarkt

Thirteen shopping malls can be found in Linz, three of which are situated in the city centre. Shopping centres include: Arkade, Atrium City Center, Shopping Mall Auwiesen, Shopping Mall Biesenfeld, Shopping Mall Industriezeile, Shopping Mall Kleinmünchen, Shopping Mall Muldenstraße, EuroCenter Oed, Shopping Mall Wegscheid, Infra Center, Lentia City, Passage, and PRO-Kaufland.

According to a study by Infrapool in October 2010, the Linzer Landstraße is the busiest shopping street outside of Vienna. The weekly frequency is noted between 240,500 (Monday–Saturday, 8 a.m. until 7 p.m.) and 228,400 (8 a.m. until 6 p.m.) passers-by, which is the second highest value – only in 2005 were more passers-by detected.

=== Markets ===
There are eleven farmer's markets as well as one weekly flea market, and two Christmas markets in Linz. One of these markets, the "Urfahraner Markt", takes place in spring and fall every year. Furthermore, there are annually Christmas and New Year's Markets. The aim of the market administration is to provide the population with a wide range of products, as well as operating the markets in an economical, suitable and customer oriented manner. Additionally, the annual market called "Linzer Marktfrühling" sets further accents and lures new customers with attractive offers.

== Transport ==
Development of the modal split in Linz (2022)
1. Public transport (Öffentlicher Personennahverkehr, ÖPNV) (20.5%)
2. Motorized individual transport (Motorisierter Individualverkehr, MIV) (42.1%)
3. Mixed public transport–MIV traffic (0.90%)
4. Bicycle (10.7%)
5. On foot (25.7%)

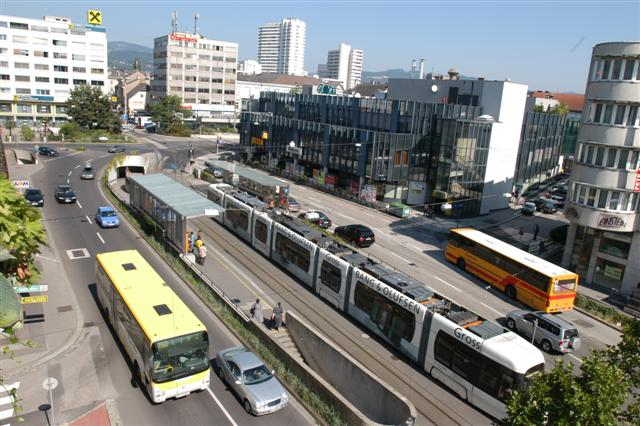
The Hinsenkampplatz traffic junction in the Urfahr district, shortly before the Nibelungen Bridge, is a focal point where pedestrian, bicycle, motor vehicle, and tram traffic converge. Beneath it run the international waterway of the Danube and the roads that follow its banks.

The city of Linz is an important transport hub. In addition to the West Autobahn A 1 (Vienna–Salzburg), which runs south of the city area, the Mühlkreis Autobahn A 7 passes through the city. Together with the Mühlviertel Expressway S 10, it forms an important transport connection to the Czech Republic. In the municipality of Ansfelden, located southwest of Linz, the Wels Autobahn A 25 branches off, which merges into the Innkreis Autobahn A 8 and leads to the German border near Passau.

In summer 2017, preparatory work began on the A 26 Westring motorway and a fourth Danube bridge. Construction of the Westring is planned in three phases, with full opening to traffic scheduled for December 2031. The Westring is intended to relieve traffic on the Römerberg Tunnel and the Kapuzinerstraße/Hopfengasse/Sandgasse/Kellergasse/Waldeggstraße corridor.

The first phase, completed in October 2024, included the new Donautal Bridge, which was opened to traffic on 15 November 2024. The second phase, planned from October 2024 to June 2029, involves construction of the Freinberg Tunnel (with a connection to Kärntner Straße/Main Railway Station) and the underground section of Waldeggstraße. The final phase consists of the construction of the new West Bridge and the completion of the missing link to the Mühlkreis Autobahn A 7, scheduled to run from June 2029 to December 2031.

In January 2018, construction began on bypasses at the VÖEST Bridge, as the bridge required refurbishment from 2020 onward. To avoid further aggravating congestion on the Mühlkreis Autobahn A 7, the decision was made to build the bypasses, which remain in place after 2020 and accommodate inner-city traffic. The bypass system was opened to traffic in summer 2020. A similar system had already proven successful during the refurbishment of Austria's busiest bridge, the Prater Bridge on Vienna's Südosttangente A 23.

To relieve traffic congestion, the bus lane on Rohrbacher Straße, coming from Puchenau toward Pöstlingberg, was opened in 1998 to cars carrying three or more occupants. This measure was estimated to save around €270,000 per year in economic terms through travel time savings of approximately 60,000 person-hours and reduced CO₂ emissions.

=== Rail transport ===
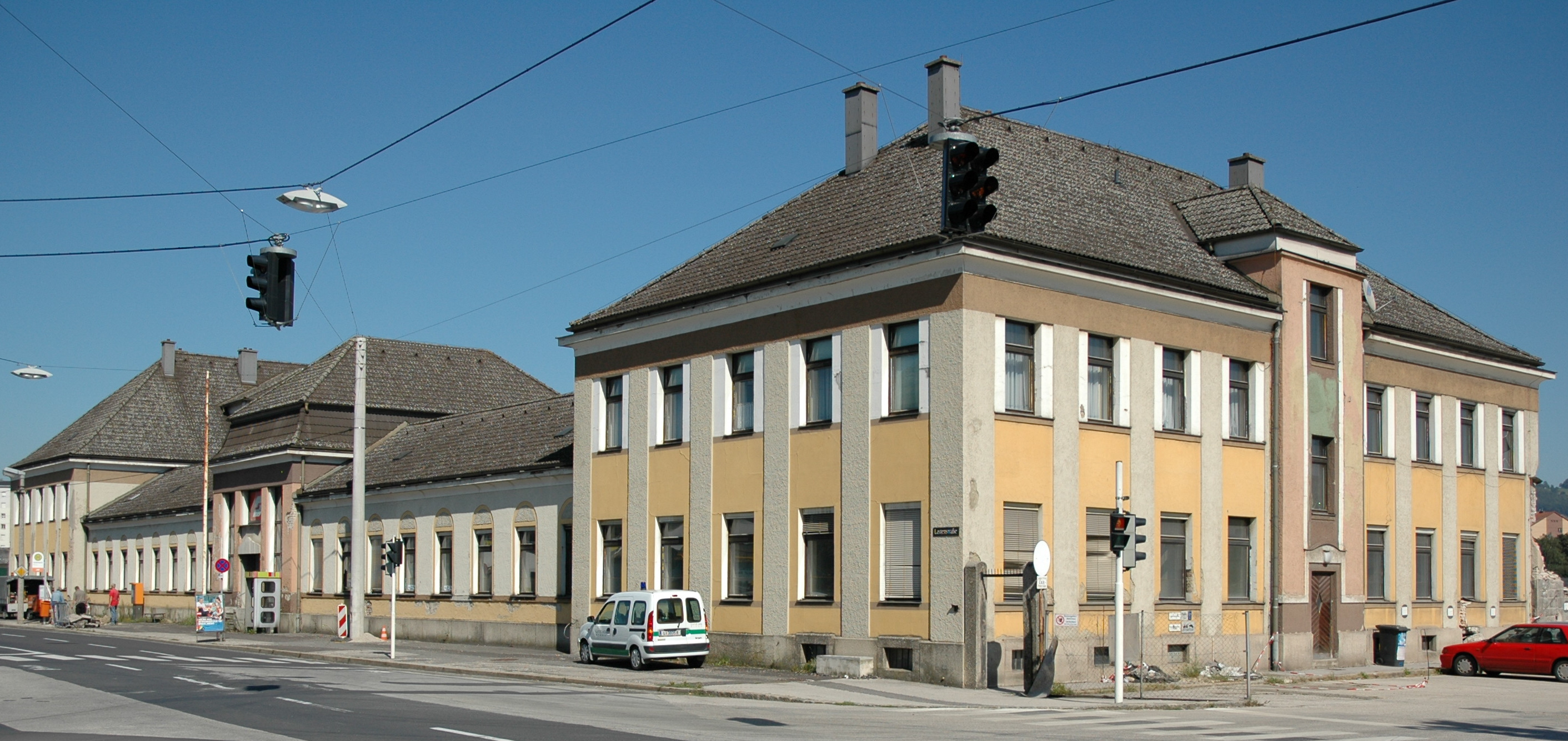
Freight yard shortly before its demolition in autumn 2006

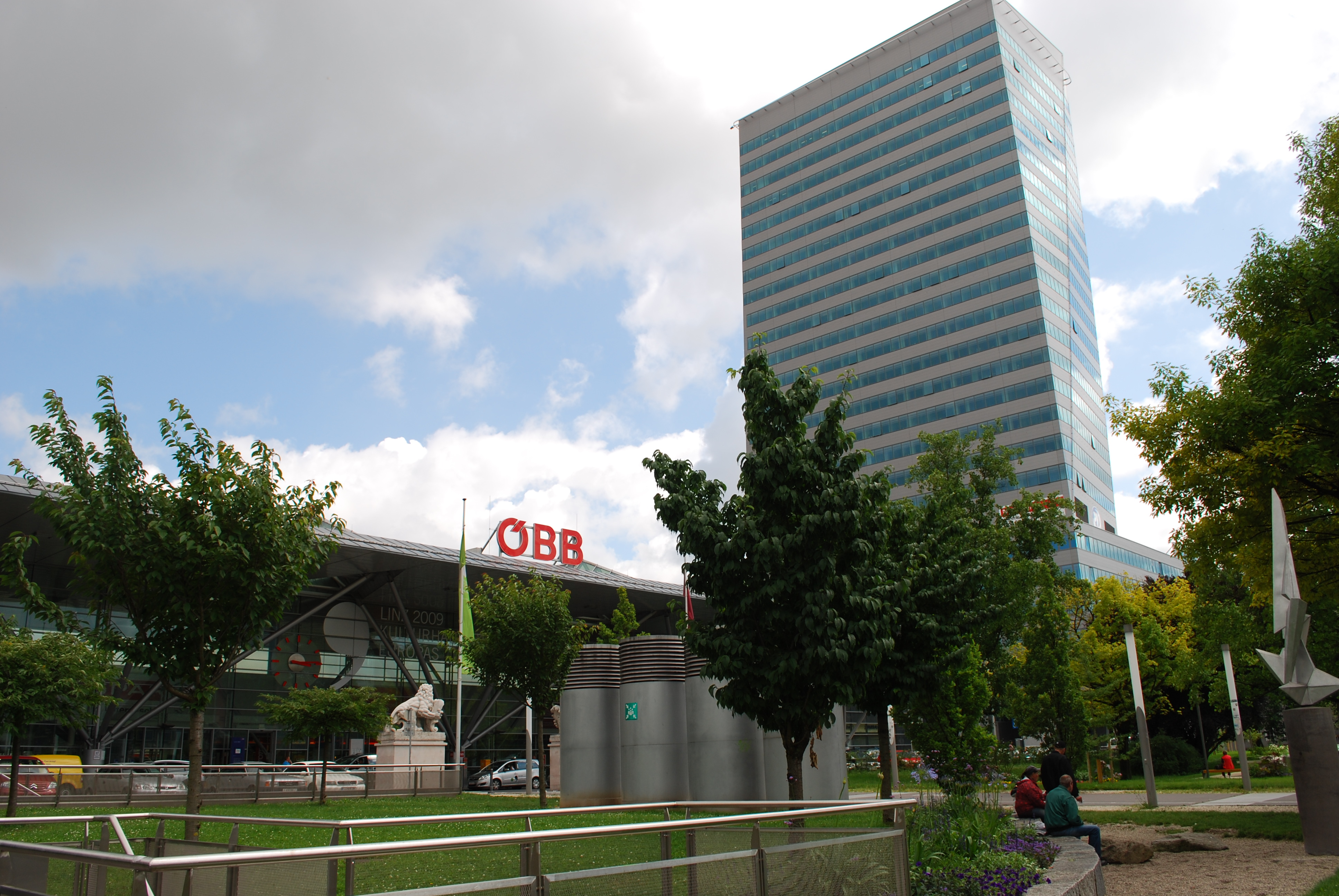
Linz Central Station

The horse-drawn railway line constructed from 1825 and opened in 1832, running from Gmunden via Wels and Linz to České Budějovice, was the first railway line on the European mainland. This line connected the Danube with the Vltava River and made Linz an important transport hub.

In 1852, Linz was connected to the Empress Elisabeth Railway (Kaiserin Elisabeth-bahn), becoming a key junction for traffic to Bavaria and Salzburg. In addition to the main railway station at the southern edge of the city at the time, the Central Freight and Marshalling Yard for goods traffic was built in 1880.

The original Linz Central Station was destroyed during the Second World War and rebuilt between 1945 and 1950. Between 2000 and 2004, as part of the Austrian Federal Railways' (ÖBB) station modernization program, it was replaced by a new station building with improved connections to local public transport. This new building was completed in 2004. In 2005, the Linz Local Railway (LILO) was integrated, and the separate local railway station was closed.

Since then, Linz Central Station has twice been voted Austria's most popular railway station. Owing to its short transfer distances, spacious design, and bright atmosphere, the building was named Austria's most popular and most beautiful station by the Austrian Transport Club (Verkehrsclub Österreich, VCÖ) seven consecutive times from 2005 to 2011, and once again in 2014.

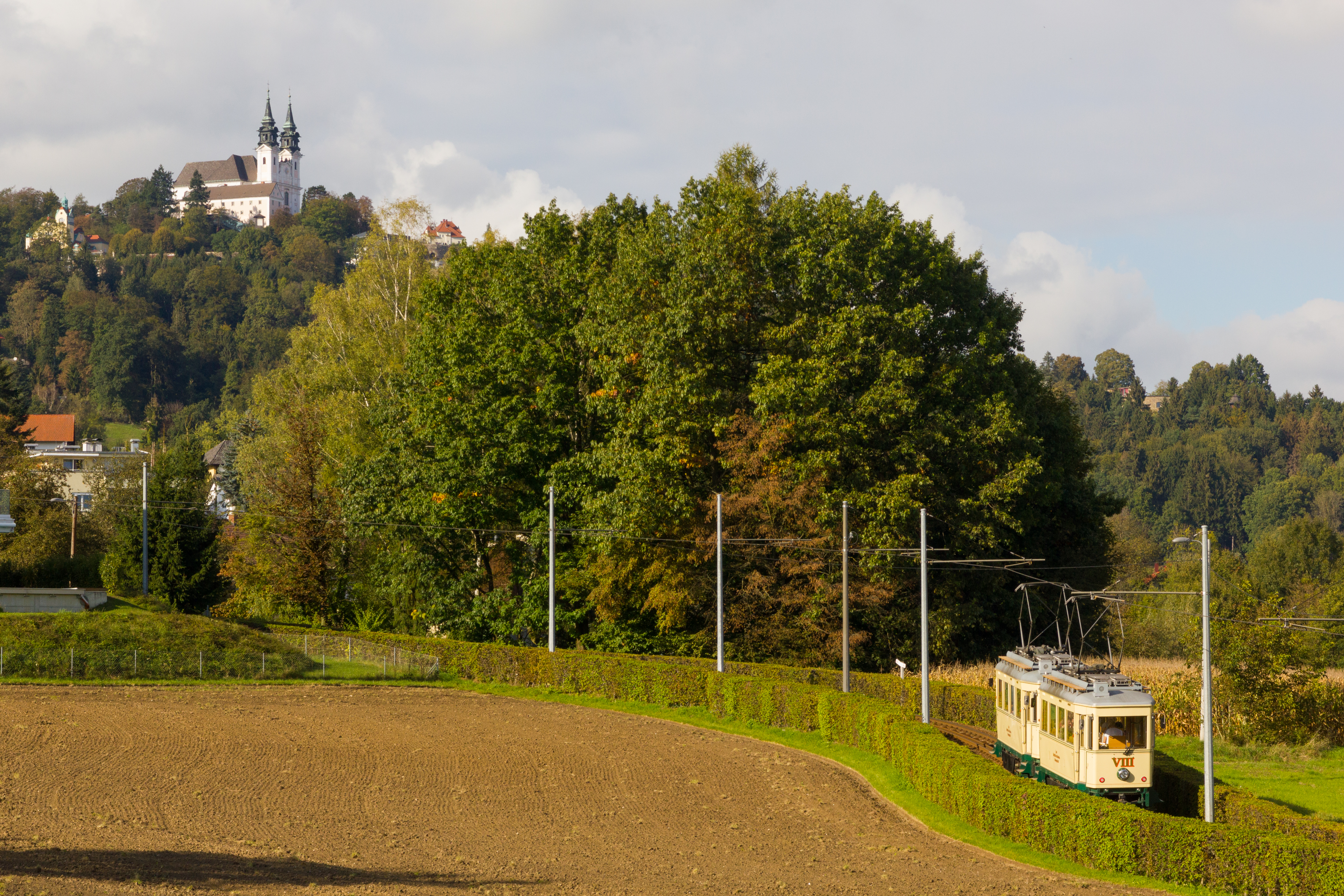
The Pöstlingbergbahn, a part of the trams in Linz

=== Public transport ===
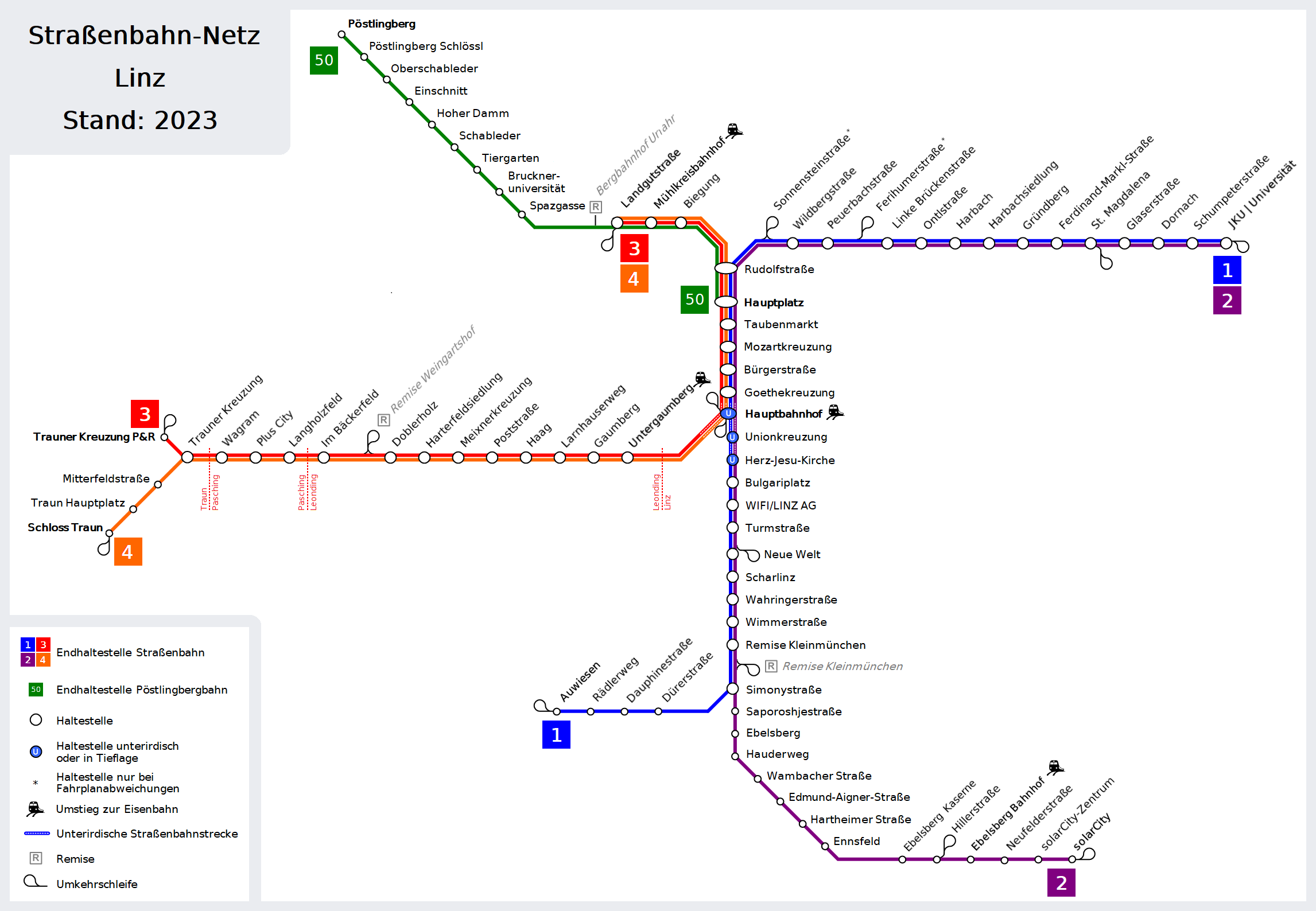
Route network of the Linz tramway

Linz Linien (formerly ESG, now part of the Linz AG Group) are the main operator of inner-city public transport, running the tram network, trolleybus lines, and urban bus services. These services are supplemented by the AST (Anruf-Sammel-Taxi, call-and-collect taxi), which operates during the day in certain areas of Linz and at night within Linz and in some neighboring municipalities.

On 5 December 2004, the Linz local transport hub (Nahverkehrsdrehscheibe Linz) was put into operation. Its core element is an underground tram section between the Bulgariplatz and Goethekreuzung stations, measuring 1.9 km in length, which was opened on 31 August 2004. This made it possible to directly connect the newly built main railway station to the tram network. Planning for this route variant dates back to 1976. After many years of debate, construction began in 2001 and was completed in 2004—three months ahead of schedule. In addition to the station, a new bus terminal was built beneath the Provincial Service Center (Landesdienstleistungszentrum).

On 11 December 2016, the Upper Austria S-Bahn (S-Bahn Oberösterreich) commenced operations, connecting Linz Central Station with the surrounding region. The S-Bahn consists of five lines running on the Westbahn, Rudolfsbahn, Pyhrn Railway, Summerau Railway, and the Linz Local Railway. Plans call for the S-Bahn to be expanded by two additional lines to the north. For this purpose, an urban rail line (Stadtbahn) is to be built from the main station to Urfahr. One line is intended to run via this new Stadtbahn route and the Mühlkreis Railway, while the other would use the Stadtbahn and a newly constructed line via Gallneukirchen to Pregarten.

=== Cycling ===
The share of cycling in Linz's overall traffic volume stands at 10.7% (as of 2022). Although the city of Linz seeks to open suitable one-way streets to cyclists and to facilitate cycling on bus lanes, dedicated cycle paths often end precisely where they would be most needed to cope with traffic conditions. Some districts can only be reached or traversed via heavily trafficked roads. For this reason, the Initiative Fahrrad (the Upper Austrian regional branch of ARGUS) is calling for a multi-year priority program to expand Linz's cycling network.

Linz is located on the heavily frequented Danube Cycle Path (R1) between Passau and Vienna. This route is among the most popular long-distance cycle paths in Austria and Germany. Under the ADFC certification program, the Danube Cycle Path was awarded the designation of Quality Cycle Route No. 1 with four stars. The assessment criteria include clear signage, safely rideable routes, and an attractive tourist infrastructure. Along the route, there are numerous cyclist-friendly accommodations equipped with e-bike charging stations.

In Linz, the Danube Cycle Path runs along the newly redesigned Danube riverbank, passing the Ars Electronica Center, the Lentos Art Museum on the opposite bank, the Brucknerhaus concert hall, the Tabakfabrik complex, and the nearby historic old town of Linz with its promenade and cathedral.

=== Shipping and ports ===
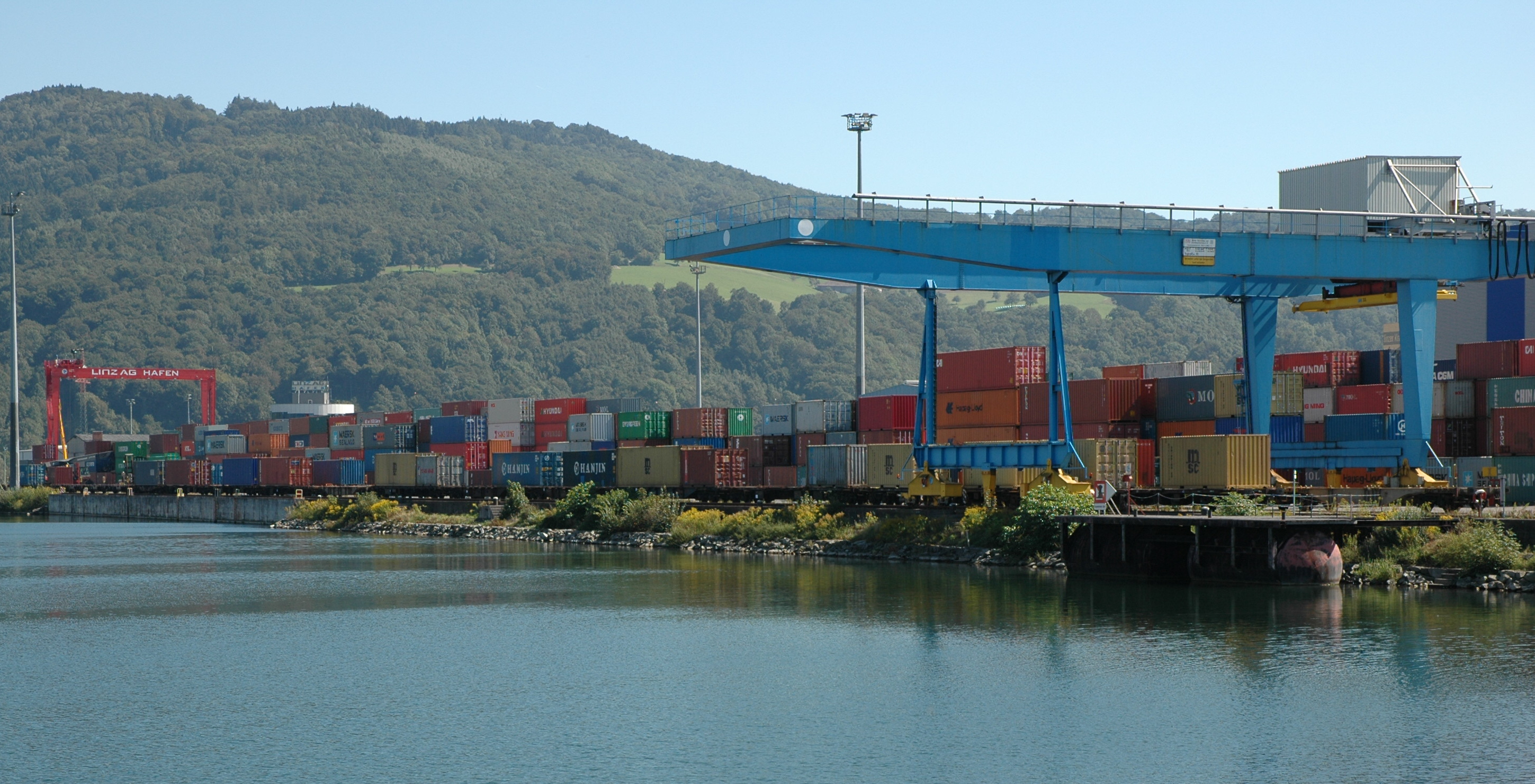
Container port in Linz

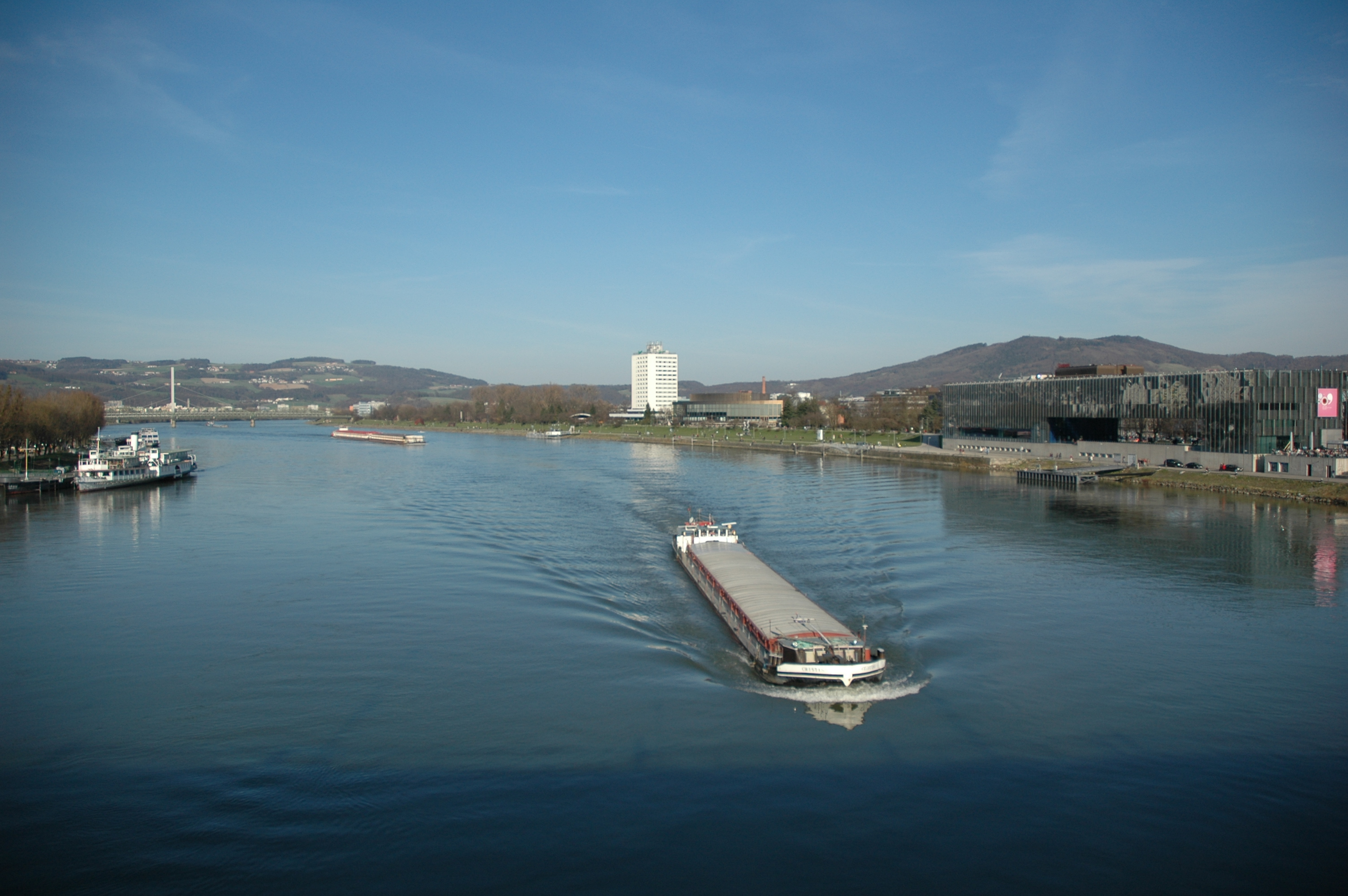
Cargo ships on the Danube river in Linz, Austria

Until 2011, Linz was the largest port location in Austria and on the Upper Danube. It is situated on Europe's largest inland waterway, which—thanks to the Rhine–Main–Danube Canal—provides a continuous water connection between the North Sea and the Black Sea. Around 6.9 million tonnes of goods were handled in 2005 at the Linz port operated by Linz AG and at the voestalpine works port. In close proximity is the Port of Enns, which has been significantly expanded in recent years and is another of Austria's four Danube ports.

In the ports of Linz, the volume of goods handled by water transport amounted to 3.1 million tonnes in 2023. The most frequently unloaded goods were ores and metal scrap, accounting for 88% of the unloaded volume. Of the loaded volume, 45% consisted of iron, steel, and non-ferrous metals, while 33% were fertilizers. Of the total waterborne cargo handled in 2023, 58% was unloaded and 42% was loaded.

The total area of the port facilities covers around 150 hectares, of which 45 hectares were water surfaces until 2011. A large-scale redevelopment project aimed at further increasing capacity began in 2012. Harbor basins that were no longer required were filled in and repurposed for warehouses and administrative buildings, while the remaining sections were modernized and redesigned.

Passenger shipping has also been increasing in Linz, particularly Danube cruise operations and day-trip services.

From 2015 onward, plans included the demolition of obsolete silos at the port, the modernization and construction of new buildings, and the creation of a new cultural level at heights of up to 18 meters above commercially used halls. This area is intended to be connected on foot to the Posthof event venue and equipped with stairways leading down to the harbor basins.

In September 2020, a second container crane was installed at the commercial port.

=== Airport ===
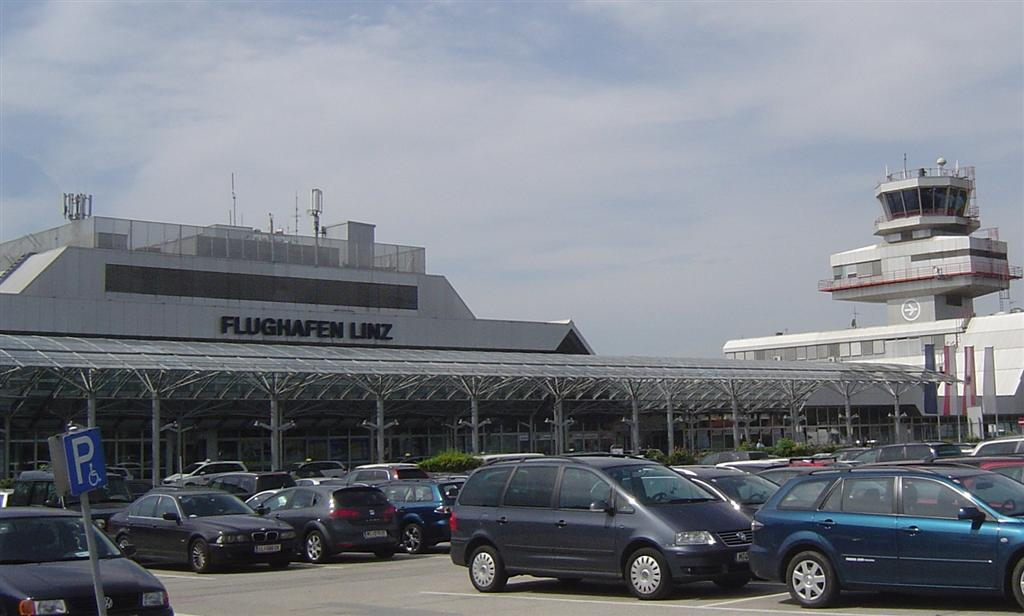
Linz–Hörsching Airport

Linz Airport is located in Hörsching, lies about 14 kilometres (8 1/2 mi) southwest of the town centre and offers scheduled flights to Düsseldorf, Frankfurt am Main, and Vienna. The airport can be reached easily via federal highways B139 and B1. The bus line 601 connects the airport within 20 minutes with the centre of Linz. There is also a free shuttle service from Hörsching railway station. Low-cost flights are available with Ryanair to London (three times per week). In addition, there are several charter connections to Egypt, Greece, Italy, Croatia, Spain, Tunisia, and Turkey. In 2023/24, scheduled flights continue to operate to and from Düsseldorf and Frankfurt am Main. The focus remains on charter flights (to Egypt, Bulgaria, France, Greece, Italy, Croatia, Poland, Malta, Morocco, Spain, Turkey, and Cyprus).

The airport also has a certain significance as a location for air cargo logistics. There is a weekday cargo flight to the DHL hub in Leipzig. Linz was also home to Austria's only cargo airline, Amerer Air. In 2014, the airport handled around 561,000 passengers and 44,414 tonnes of cargo. In the following year, passenger numbers stood at 529,785, while cargo volume increased to 45,985 tonnes. In 2023, only 232,950 passengers were handled. Although this represented an increase of 12.1 percent compared to 2022, passenger numbers remained below the level recorded in 2019. With 44,342 tonnes of air freight, Linz Airport remains by far the leading regional cargo airport in Austria.

== Population ==
Population development of Linz from 1869 to 2016

In the 1971 census, Linz reached a record population for the first time, with 204,889 inhabitants. While the postwar years—especially 1947—were characterized by substantial natural population growth, with around 3,750 births compared to 2,000 deaths, the number of births was halved from about 3,200 in 1962 to 1,600 in 1979. However, birth deficits had already appeared in 1970, when the steadily rising number of deaths (from 2,000 in 1947 to 2,500 in 1970) surpassed the number of births. Although deaths subsequently declined again to around 1,900 in 2004, the number of births—after reaching its lowest point in 1979—rose only irregularly and slowly following an interim peak in 1993 (about 2,000 births) and another dip in 1999 (just under 1,700 births). While there were almost as few births in 2001 as in 1999, the number has increased steadily since then, reaching 1,886 in 2005.

Linz is the only major city in Austria that—with approximately 157,000 jobs—offers nearly twice as many jobs as its resident population can supply. This substantial surplus of jobs results in a high rate of commuters traveling into the city from the surrounding areas, leading to significant traffic problems. According to a 2023 Eurostat survey, around 823,514 people live in the Linz metropolitan region.

Large commercial and industrial areas are also located to the south of the city. In addition, several shopping centers (such as PlusCity and Infra Center) in Linz and neighboring municipalities further exacerbate traffic congestion.

More than other Austrian cities, Linz experienced significant population losses in recent decades—particularly between 1991 and 2001—due to the relocation of residents, mainly families, to the surrounding areas. This trend of suburbanization was reinforced by good transport connections, including the repeatedly expanded West Autobahn (A1) and Mühlkreis Autobahn (A7), as well as the Linz Local Railway (Linzer Lokalbahn, LILO), the Mühlkreis Railway, the Pyhrn Railway, and the Summerau Railway, all of which enable rapid connections even over longer distances. A countervailing trend, such as that which led to strong population growth in Vienna, Graz, or Salzburg after 2001, was only observed in Linz from 2012 onward. By the end of 2015, the city's population once again exceeded the 200,000 mark.

As of 1 January 2025, Linz had a population of 214,064 inhabitants. However, the Statistics Austria recorded a population of 213,557 on the same date.

Historical population

Year	Pop.	±%
1869	49,635	—
1880	56,569	+14.0%
1890	65,090	+15.1%
1900	83,356	+28.1%
1910	97,852	+17.4%
1923	107,463	+9.8%
1934	115,338	+7.3%
1939	128,177	+11.1%

Year	Pop.	±%
1951	184,685	+44.1%
1961	195,978	+6.1%
1971	204,889	+4.5%
1981	199,910	−2.4%
1991	203,044	+1.6%
2001	183,504	−9.6%
2011	189,889	+3.5%
2021	206,853	+8.9%

Source: Censuses

=== Religion ===
Distribution of religious affiliation according to the 2001 census
1. Roman Catholicism (60.9%)
2. No religious affiliation (21.6%)
3. Islam (6.70%)
4. Protestant (4.40%)
5. Eastern Orthodox Christian (2.50%)

From 1867 (the Religious Patent) until 1938, following immigration from the Nuremberg region as well as from Bohemia and Moravia, a small Jewish community (Israelitische Kultusgemeinde Linz) existed in Linz. In the 1920s it reached a peak of nearly 1,000 members, the majority of whom lived in the Urfahr district. In 1877, the young community built the Linz Synagogue. As early as the beginning of the 1930s, emigration began in response to growing antisemitism. Following the Anschluss in 1938, organized persecution and murder commenced, and Jewish property was expropriated ("Aryanized"). During the November Pogroms of 1938 (Kristallnacht), the synagogue was destroyed. A new synagogue was opened on the site in 1968. Today, the Jewish community of Linz has fewer than 100 members.

Christian sacred buildings in the city include the New Cathedral, the Old Cathedral, the City Parish Church, the Pöstlingberg Pilgrimage Basilica, and the particularly ancient St. Martin's Church.

Important Roman Catholic institutions in the city include the Catholic Private University of Theology Linz and the episcopal seat of the Diocese of Linz.

There are several Roman Catholic and Protestant Lutheran (A.B.) parishes in Linz, as well as one Protestant Reformed (H.B.) and one Old Catholic parish. Free churches and other communities include Baptists, Evangelicals, Mennonites, Methodists, Adventists, and the New Apostolic Church.

The Islamic religious community is working on the establishment of a cultural center in the southern part of the city, which is intended to house not only a prayer space but also Islamic associations as well as social and cultural institutions.

Serbian emigrants founded the Serbian Orthodox Church in Linz, while Romanian Evangelical Christians established the Hope Church (Hoffnungskirche), which has since become part of the Pentecostal movement.

Largest groups of foreign residents
Nationality	Population (1 January 2025)
Romania	6,417
Bosnia and Herzegovina	5,757
Croatia	4,430
Turkey	4,055
Germany	3,912
Syria	3,600
Afghanistan	3,290
Hungary	3,007
Kosovo	2,724
Serbia	2,675
Ukraine	2,107
North Macedonia	1,711
Russia	1,553

== Statistical districts ==
Since January 2014 the city has been divided into 16 statistical districts:

No.	District	Inhabitants	Area in ha
1.	Innere Stadt	24,785	278.9
2.	Urfahr	23,581	426.8
3.	Pöstlingberg	4,527	851.1
4.	St. Magdalena	11,890	655.3
5.	Dornach-Auhof	7,283	682.6
6.	Kaplanhof	9,753	243.2
7.	Franckviertel	7,216	120.7
8.	Bulgariplatz	14,993	260.3
9.	Froschberg	11,654	452.8
10.	Bindermichl-Keferfeld	19,875	412.0
11.	Spallerhof	12,021	297.1
12.	Neue Heimat	13,095	413.2
13.	Kleinmünchen-Auwiesen	22,209	645.1
14.	Industriegebiet-Hafen	138	1,277.4
15.	Ebelsberg	10,763	1,291.2
16.	Pichling	7,812	1,290.0

Before 2014 Linz was divided into nine districts and 36 statistical quarters. They were:

1. Ebelsberg
2. Innenstadt: Altstadtviertel, Rathausviertel, Kaplanhofviertel, Neustadtviertel, Volksgartenviertel, Römerberg-Margarethen
3. Kleinmünchen: Kleinmünchen, Neue Welt, Scharlinz, Bergern, Neue Heimat, Wegscheid, Schörgenhub
4. Lustenau: Makartviertel, Franckviertel, Hafenviertel
5. Pöstlingberg: Pöstlingberg, Bachl-Gründberg
6. St. Magdalena: St. Magdalena, Katzbach, Elmberg
7. St. Peter
8. Urfahr: Alt-Urfahr, Heilham, Hartmayrsiedlung, Harbachsiedlung, Karlhofsiedlung, Auberg
9. Waldegg: Freinberg, Froschberg, Keferfeld, Bindermichl, Spallerhof, Wankmüllerhofviertel, Andreas-Hofer-Platz-Viertel

== Climate ==
Linz has an oceanic climate (Köppen climate classification: Cfb), with warm summers and quite cold winters.

Climate data for Linz (1991–2020, extremes 1939–present)
Month	Jan	Feb	Mar	Apr	May	Jun	Jul	Aug	Sep	Oct	Nov	Dec	Year
Record high °C (°F)	17.2 (63.0)	18.6 (65.5)	24.4 (75.9)	29.8 (85.6)	33.1 (91.6)	35.4 (95.7)	37.4 (99.3)	37.8 (100.0)	34.9 (94.8)	26.1 (79.0)	23.9 (75.0)	14.8 (58.6)	37.8 (100.0)
Mean maximum °C (°F)	11.6 (52.9)	13.9 (57.0)	19.3 (66.7)	23.9 (75.0)	27.8 (82.0)	31.4 (88.5)	33.2 (91.8)	32.7 (90.9)	27.6 (81.7)	22.0 (71.6)	15.6 (60.1)	11.2 (52.2)	34.2 (93.6)
Mean daily maximum °C (°F)	2.8 (37.0)	5.8 (42.4)	10.4 (50.7)	16.7 (62.1)	20.2 (68.4)	24.3 (75.7)	25.2 (77.4)	24.9 (76.8)	20.2 (68.4)	14.0 (57.2)	8.1 (46.6)	3.5 (38.3)	14.7 (58.5)
Daily mean °C (°F)	0.5 (32.9)	2.2 (36.0)	6.6 (43.9)	11.6 (52.9)	15.9 (60.6)	19.2 (66.6)	20.9 (69.6)	20.6 (69.1)	15.9 (60.6)	10.8 (51.4)	5.6 (42.1)	1.5 (34.7)	10.9 (51.6)
Mean daily minimum °C (°F)	−1.8 (28.8)	−1.1 (30.0)	2.3 (36.1)	6.4 (43.5)	10.4 (50.7)	14.2 (57.6)	15.2 (59.4)	15.0 (59.0)	11.5 (52.7)	7.0 (44.6)	3.0 (37.4)	−0.7 (30.7)	6.8 (44.2)
Mean minimum °C (°F)	−11.0 (12.2)	−9.4 (15.1)	−4.6 (23.7)	−0.4 (31.3)	4.3 (39.7)	8.7 (47.7)	10.9 (51.6)	10.5 (50.9)	6.3 (43.3)	1.1 (34.0)	−3.8 (25.2)	−8.9 (16.0)	−13.2 (8.2)
Record low °C (°F)	−30.0 (−22.0)	−26.0 (−14.8)	−22.7 (−8.9)	−4.0 (24.8)	−2.3 (27.9)	0.7 (33.3)	5.7 (42.3)	4.9 (40.8)	−1.1 (30.0)	−6.5 (20.3)	−14.5 (5.9)	−27.2 (−17.0)	−30.0 (−22.0)
Average precipitation mm (inches)	56.6 (2.23)	48.5 (1.91)	65.8 (2.59)	51.3 (2.02)	88.9 (3.50)	89.2 (3.51)	105.1 (4.14)	95.3 (3.75)	69.4 (2.73)	58.5 (2.30)	54.6 (2.15)	56.5 (2.22)	839.7 (33.06)
Average snowfall cm (inches)	18 (7.1)	17 (6.7)	7 (2.8)	0 (0)	0 (0)	0 (0)	0 (0)	0 (0)	0 (0)	0 (0)	5 (2.0)	14 (5.5)	61 (24)
Average precipitation days (≥ 1.0 mm)	10.0	9.0	10.1	8.1	11.2	10.8	12.3	10.1	9.3	8.9	9.3	10.9	120.0
Average relative humidity (%) (at 14:00)	77.9	69.1	59.8	52.5	53.9	55.6	54.9	55.2	61.4	68.3	77.2	80.6	63.9
Mean monthly sunshine hours	49.3	93.5	119.3	171.4	234.7	222.6	238.6	236.2	172.6	110.3	49.2	43.4	1,741.1
Percentage possible sunshine	20.2	36.0	35.5	46.4	54.9	51.0	53.8	57.0	49.8	37.4	20.2	18.6	40.1
Source: Central Institute for Meteorology and Geodynamics (snow 1981–2010, sun 1971–2000)

== Tourism ==
In 2024, five- and four-star hotels in Linz recorded 394,695 overnight stays across 2,538 beds. Of these, 195,824 overnight stays were by Austrian citizens and 198,871 by foreign visitors. September was the busiest month of 2024, with 39,769 overnight stays.

Three-star hotels, with a capacity of 2,071 beds, recorded a total of 324,460 overnight stays. Of these, 159,206 overnight stays were by domestic guests, compared with 165,254 by foreign guests. July was the busiest month of 2024, with 32,350 overnight stays.

In five-, four-, and three-star establishments, overnight stays by domestic guests increased from 129,808 in 1949 to 355,030 in 2024, while overnight stays by foreign guests rose from 17,650 in 1949 to 364,125 in 2024. By contrast, overnight stays by domestic guests in two- and one-star establishments declined from 78,234 in 1949 to 57,007 in 2024. In the same two- and one-star category, overnight stays by foreign guests increased from 1,964 in 1949 to 44,011 in 2024.

In 2024, the number of overnight stays in Linz increased by 19,337 (+1.9%) compared to the previous year, rising from 1,002,224 to 1,021,561. Of these, 503,637 overnight stays were recorded by domestic visitors. Among foreign visitors, guests from Germany accounted for the highest number of overnight stays, with a total of 198,977, followed by visitors from Hungary with 21,016 overnight stays and tourists from Poland with 20,863 overnight stays.

In November 2025, overnight stays increased by 3,890 (+5.0%), from 77,602 to 81,492, compared to the same month of the previous year. German visitors were again the most frequent foreign guests, followed by tourists from Italy, with visitors from the Czech Republic ranking third.

Overnight stay by foreign guests in 2025
Rank	State	Number of overnight stays
1.	Germany	198,977
2.	Hungary	21,016
3.	Poland	20,863
4.	Italy	20,421
5.	Czech Republic	18,617
6.	Switzerland Liechtenstein	18,541
7.	United States	14,564
8.	Romania	13,290
9.	France Monaco	12,859
10.	Netherlands	12,423

== Destinations of interest ==
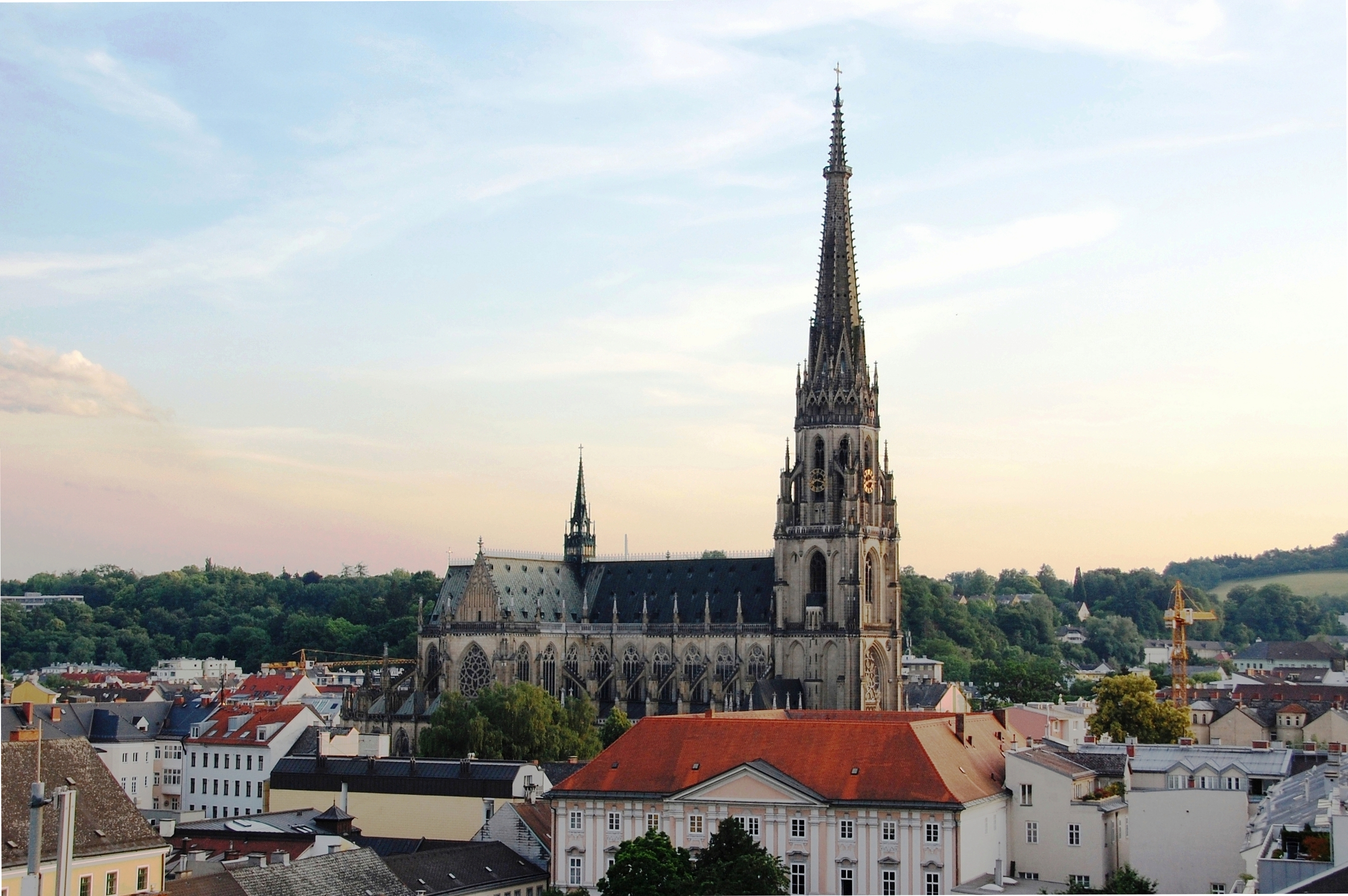
The new cathedral

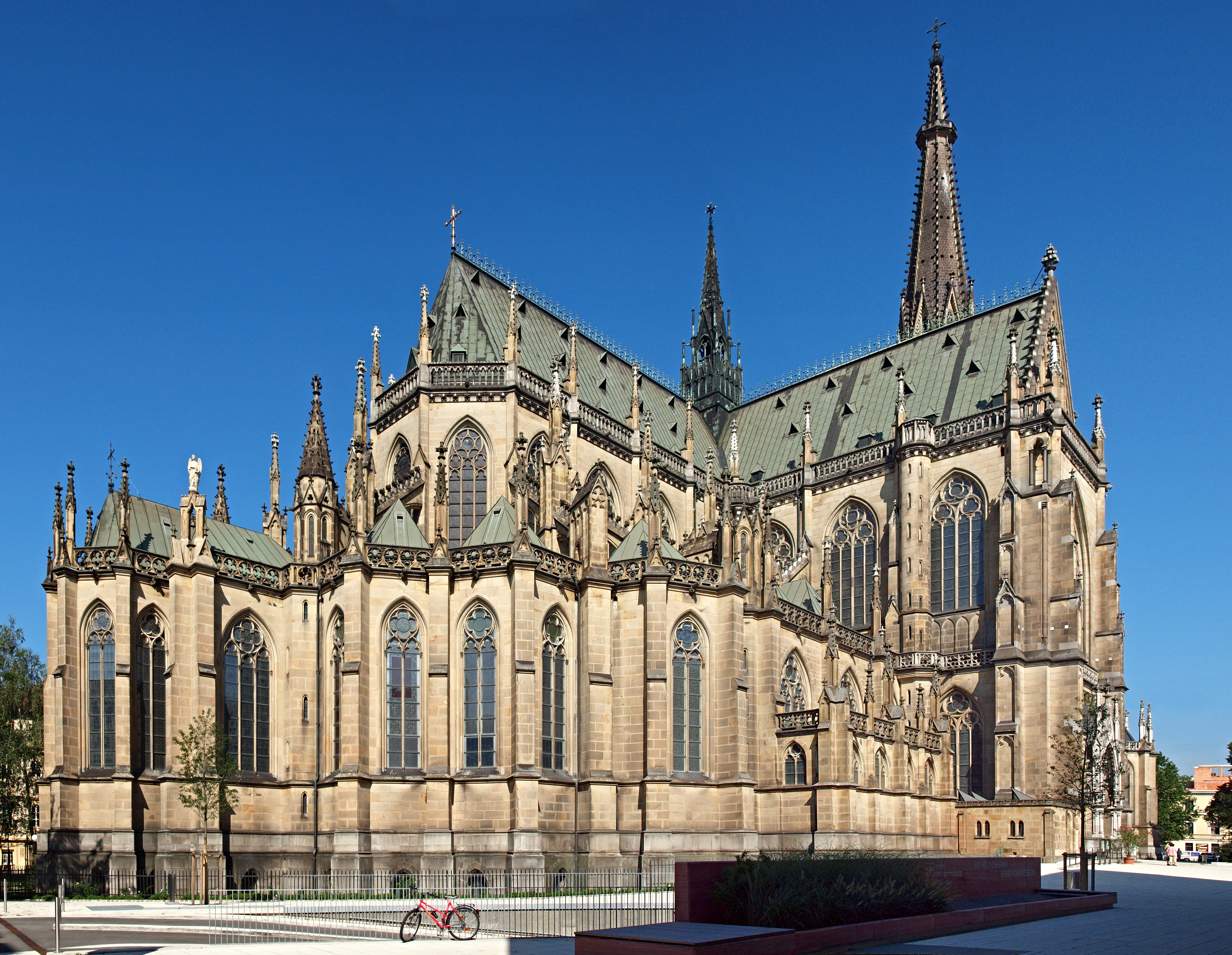
A close up of the neogothic new cathedral

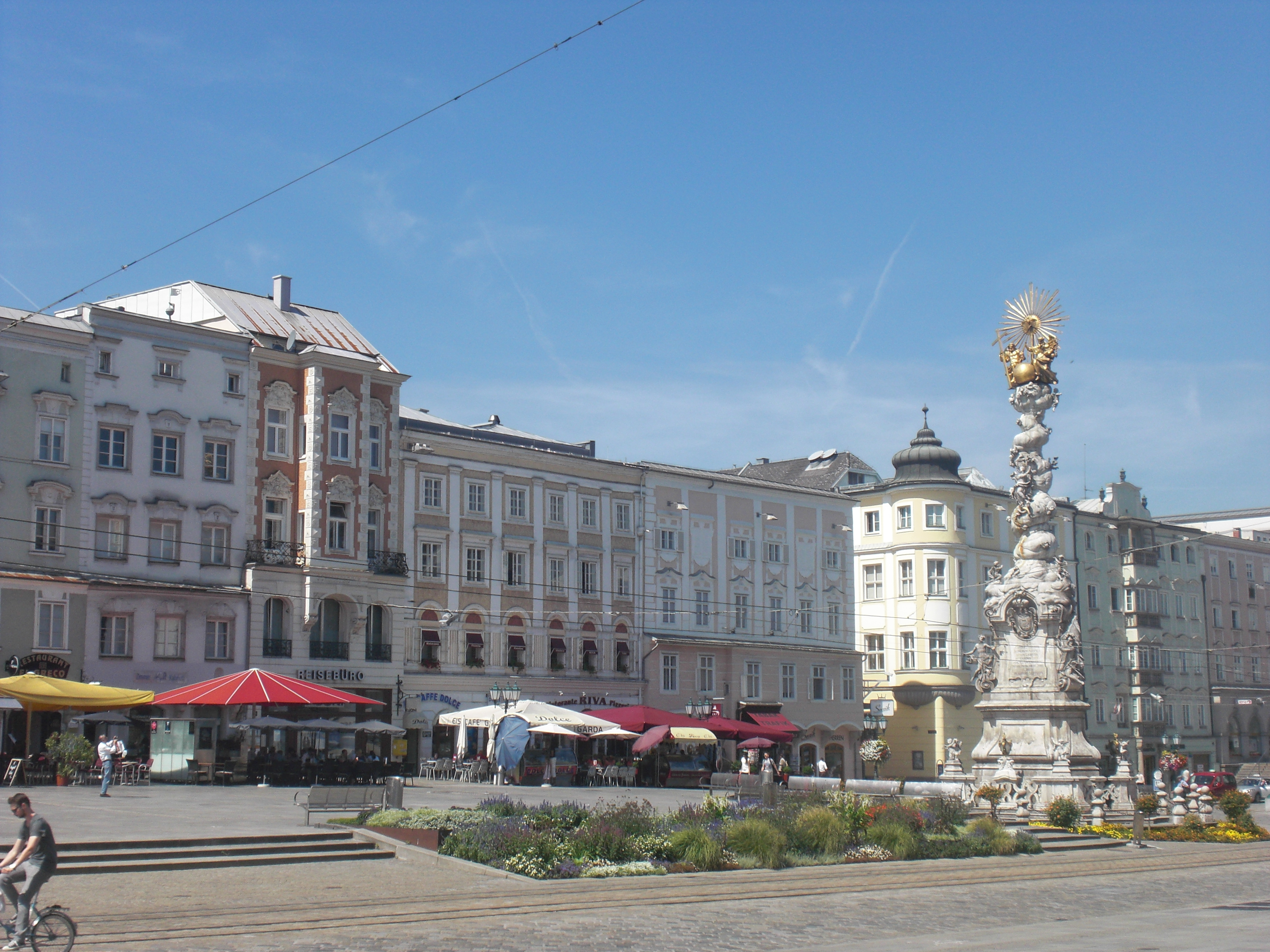
Part of main square with trinity column

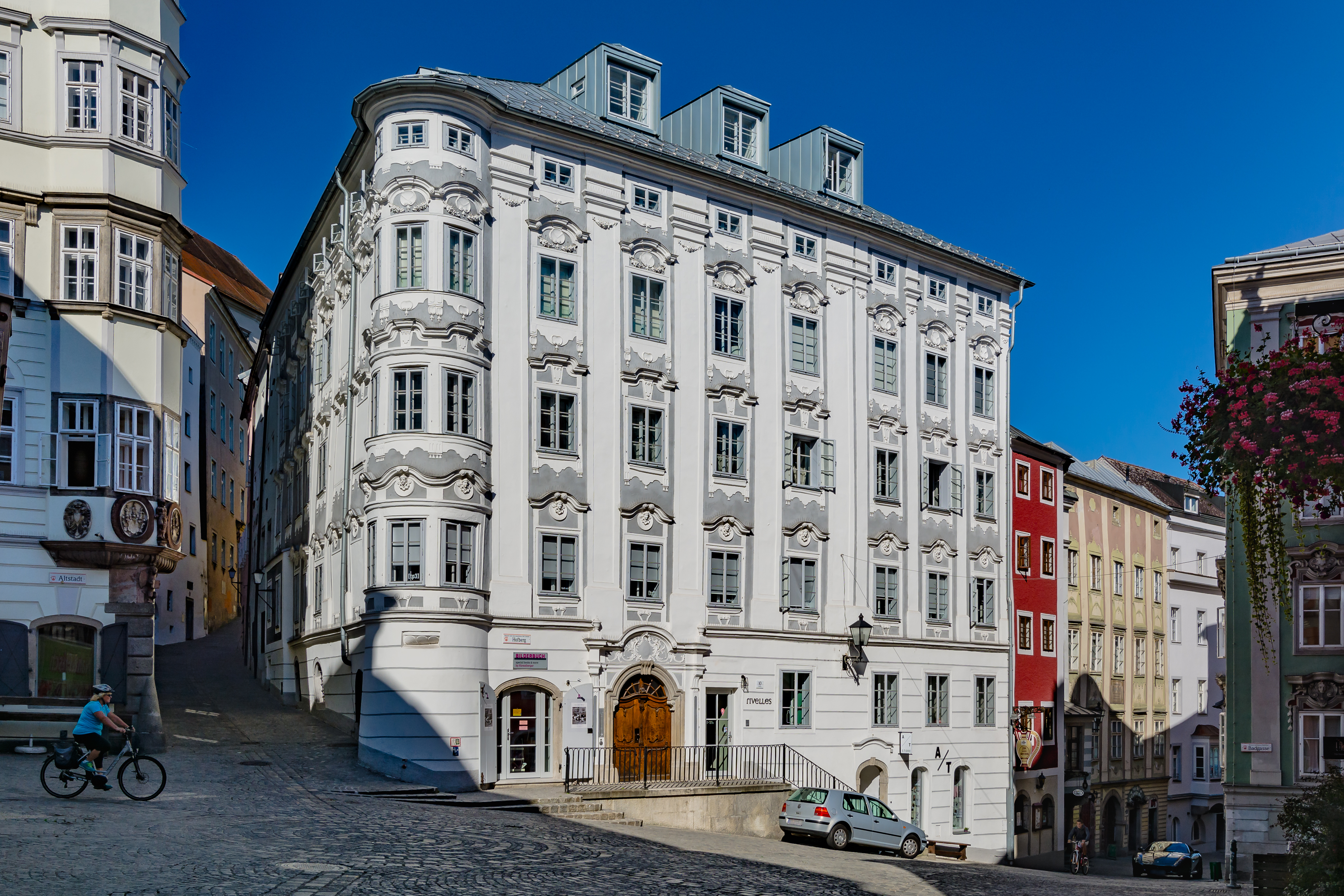
Old quarter scene

The main street "Landstraße" leads from the "Blumauerplatz" to "Taubenmarkt" (Pigeonmarket) near the main square. The main square (built in 1230), with an area of 13,200 m^{2} (142,000 sq ft), is one of the largest converted squares in Europe. In the middle of the main square the high "Pestsäule" ("plague column", also known as "Dreifaltigkeitssäule" (Dreifaltigkeit means Holy Trinity)) was built to remember the people who died in the plague epidemics. It was designed by Antonio Beduzzi in 1713, and was finished in 1723.

Around the main square are many historically relevant and architecturally interesting houses, such as the Old Town Hall, the Feichtinger House with its carillon, which changes the melody depending on the season, the Kirchmayr House, the Schmidtberger House or the bridgehead buildings, which house a part of the Linz Art University.

West of the main square there is the old quarter with many other historic buildings, such as Renaissance houses or older houses with a baroque face.

Near the Schloss/castle, being the former residence of emperor Friedrich the III—the oldest Austrian church is located: Sankt/Saint Martins church. It was built during early medieval Carolingian times.

- St. Mary's Cathedral (Mariä-Empfängnis-Dom), Roman Catholic, in Gothic-Revival style. With a total height of 134.8 m (442 ft), the cathedral is the tallest church in Austria. Constructed in the years of 1862 and 1924, it is fully built of sandstone with unfinished front details.
- Mozarthaus is the house, dating to the end of the 16th century, where the famous Austrian composer Wolfgang Amadeus Mozart composed the "Linz" Symphony and "Linz" Sonata during a three-day stay there in November 1783. Today, the exterior and inner courtyard of the house can be visited, but not the interior.
- Pöstlingberg-Kirche: pilgrimage church on the Pöstlingberg hill. The basilica is the city's landmark and was built from 1738 until 1774, located on 537m sea level.
- Pöstlingbergbahn is the steepest mountain rail in the world which was built in 1898 and operates gear-wheel free (functional grip between wheel and rail: gradient of 10.5%)
- Linzer Grottenbahn: A grotto railway is based up on the hill of Pöstling
- Brucknerhaus: the concert and congress house located on the Donaulände was first opened in 1973 and is venue of the Brucknerfest since 1974. It is named after the composer Anton Bruckner, who was born in Ansfelden, a small town next to Linz. The modern Concert Hall owes its unique acoustics to its wood paneling. The Great Hall of the Bruckner House, also called Brucknersaal, is the architectural jewel hosting an organ consisting of more than 4,200 pipes and 51 registers. The spacious stage in particular was designed for 220 performers. In 2017 the life and works of Anton Bruckner were the focus of the Bruckner Festival held under the motto "Bruckner elementar". Bruckner's works were the focus of the festival presented by national and international artists.
- Gugl Stadium, is home to the LASK (Linzer Athletik Sport Klub), which is claimed to be the third oldest football club in Austria.
- Linzer Landestheater
- Kremsmünsterer Haus: is to find at the "Alter Markt", located in the inner city of Linz where, as legends say, emperor Friedrich III. had died.
- Landhaus: The country house was built in the 16th century and is the headquarters of the governor, the upper Austrian parliament and the government of upper Austria. Johannes Kepler used to teach here for more than 14 years.

== Architecture ==
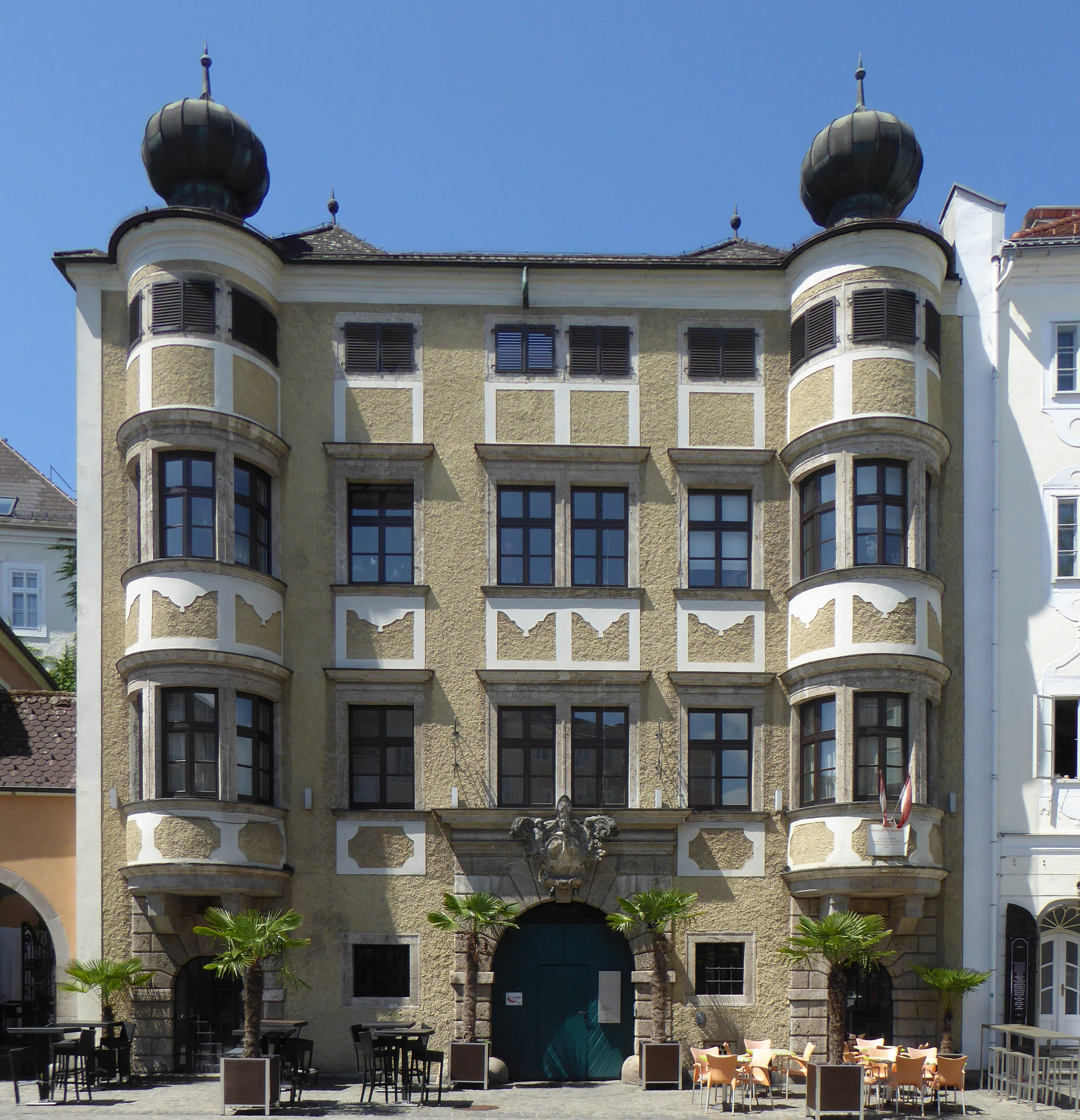
The former townhouse of Kremsmünster Abbey

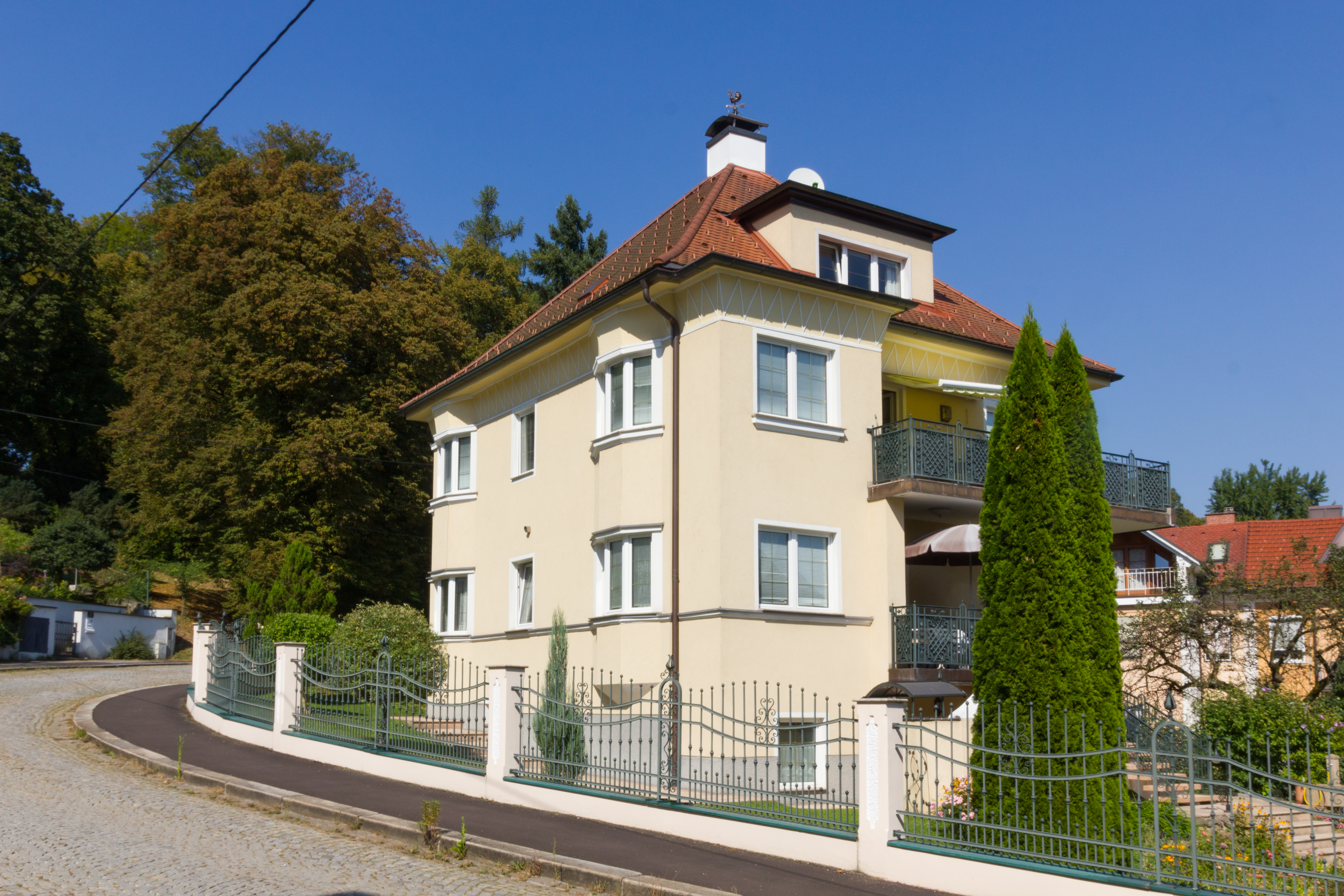
A historic suburban villa at Freinberg

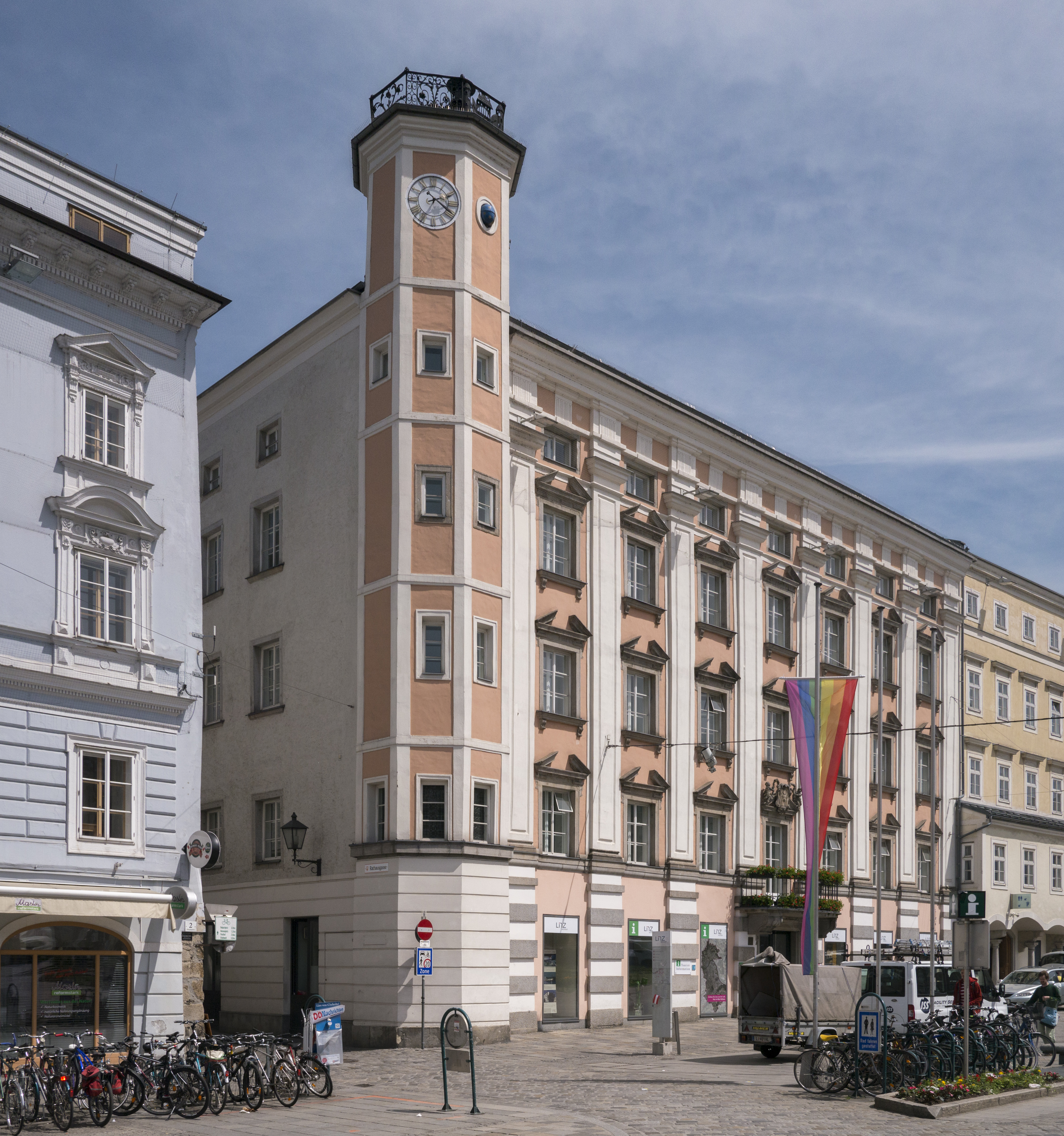
The old town hall

As many central European cities, the cityscape of Linz is characterised by small and several sacred buildings. The Mariä Empfängnis Dom or New Cathedral is the biggest church in Austria, not by height (it is roughly 2 metres shorter than the St. Stephen's Cathedral (Stephansdom) in Vienna), but by capacity.

The historic centre is characterised by its medieval architectural style, whereas in those parts of the city that border with the historic centre the architecture is of neoclassical, neo-baroque and neo-renaissance styles. Even further from the historic centre there are living areas, such as Franckviertel, Froschberg, Bindermichl and Kleinmünchen southern of the Danube and Alt-Urfahr northern of the Danube. These areas are where residential buildings can be found that are still referred to as "Hitlerbauten" or "Hitler buildings", because they were built during the interwar period and the time of Nazi dictatorship. The residential area called Gugl became a well liked living area among the wealthy at around 1900, which is why there are numerous villas still there today.

Amongst the newer buildings is the Linz Hauptbahnhof station, which was designed by Wilhelm Holzbauer and added the Terminal Tower skyscraper as part of a mixed-use complex. Between 2005 und 2011 it was voted Austria's most beautiful railway station seven times in a row by the Verkehrsclub Österreich. The Wissensturm ("Tower of knowledge") with a height of about 63 metres, houses the public library and the Volkshochschule, an adult education centre. It was designed by Franz Kneidinger and Heinz Stögmüller and opened in 2007. Lentos Art Museum, which opened in 2003, was designed by Zürich-based architects Weber & Hofer and the Musiktheater (music theatre), which opened in 2013, was designed by Terry Pawson.

== Culture ==
The city is now home to a music and arts scene that is well-funded by the city and the state of Upper Austria. Between Lentos Art Museum and the "Brucknerhaus", is the "Donaulände", which is also referred to as "Kulturmeile" ("culture mile"). This is a park alongside the river, which is used mainly by young people to relax and meet in summer. It is also used for the Ars Electronica Festival in early September and the "Stream Festival", which takes place annually. In June, July and August the "Musikpavillon" is placed in the park where musical groups of different styles perform on Thursdays, Fridays, Saturdays and Sundays free of charge.

Linz has other culture institutions, such as the Posthof, which is near the harbour, and the Stadtwerkstatt, which is by the river Danube. The Pflasterspektakel, an international street art festival, takes place each year in July in and around the Landstraße and the main square. Linz was the European Capital of Culture in 2009, along with Vilnius, the capital of Lithuania.

The aim is to maintain and represent the cultural diversity.

The Ars Electronica Center can be considered as the centre of media art and attracts every year during its festival national and international guests to Linz.

The latest project developed by Linz in the context of the City of Media Arts project is the Valie Export Center, which is located in the Tabakfabrik (tobacco factory) and carried out in cooperation with the University of Art and Design Linz. It serves as an international research hub for media and performance art. Beyond that, it comprises the legacy as well as the archives of the most renowned media artist coming from Linz, Valie Export, who has received numerous national as well as international prizes. Along with the Ars Electronica archives, Linz hosts two internationally renowned archives for media art.

Since 2009, the Open Commons Linz initiative has made available a wide variety of "free" data: geo-data and statistical information having to do with city life, local government, recreation and tourism. An associated effort is the Hotspot initiative that has installed 202 hotspots providing free WLAN, as well as Public Server, the municipal cloud available to all citizens registered in Linz. Linz is thus at the forefront in Europe when it comes to universal access to open data.

Linz houses 43 galleries and exhibit rooms, 13 cultural centres, one club centre, as well as four educational institutes.

=== Museums ===
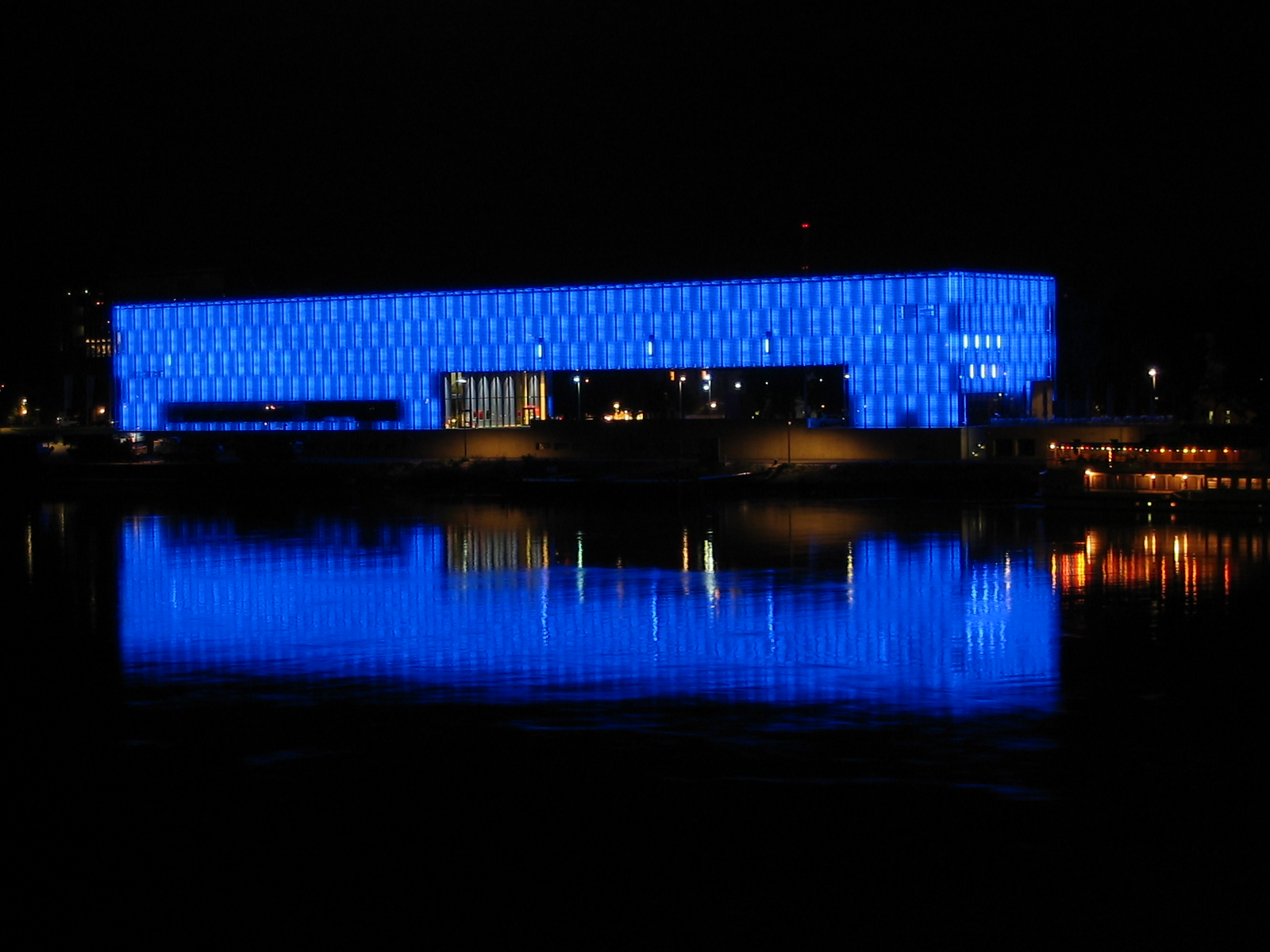
Lentos museum

- The Lentos (built 2003) is a modern art gallery, presenting art from the 20th and 21st centuries. It is situated on the south banks of the river Danube. The building can be illuminated at night from the inside with blue, pink, red and violet, due to its plastic casing.
- Ars Electronica Center (AEC) (also called museum of the future) is a museum and research facility on the north bank of the Danube (in the Urfahr district), across the river from the Hauptplatz (main square). The AEC is a significant world centre for new media arts, attracting a large gathering of technologically oriented artists every year for the Ars Electronica Festival. The AEC museum is home to the Deep Space 8K, which offers a unique
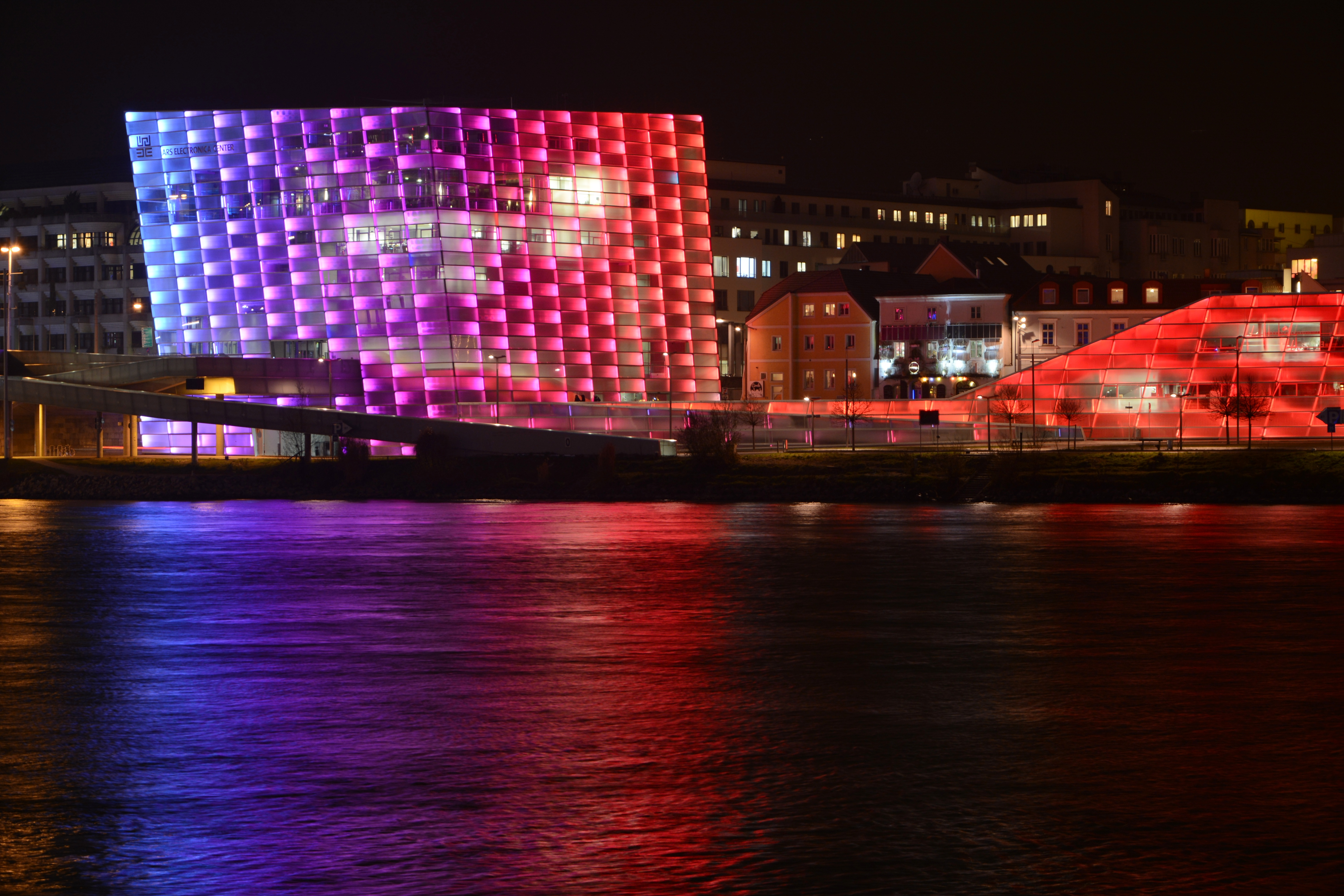
  Ars Electronica Center
  virtual world with wall and floor projections (each 16 by 9 m [52 by 30 ft]), laser tracking and 3D animations.
- City Museum Nordico houses an art collection as well as a historical and an archaeological collection, all of which relate to the city of Linz. About 16,000 people visited the museum in 2013.
- Upper Austrian Regional Museum (Oberösterreichisches Landesmuseum) has three main locations that focus on different aspects of the regional history: The Landesgalerie (regional gallery) exhibits modern and contemporary art, the Schlossmuseum houses archaeological findings all of which retrace Upper Austria's cultural history whereas the aim of the Biologiezentrum Linz-Dornach (centre of biology) is to retrace the region's natural history with an exhibition of about 16 million objects (which makes it the second biggest museum for natural history in Austria).

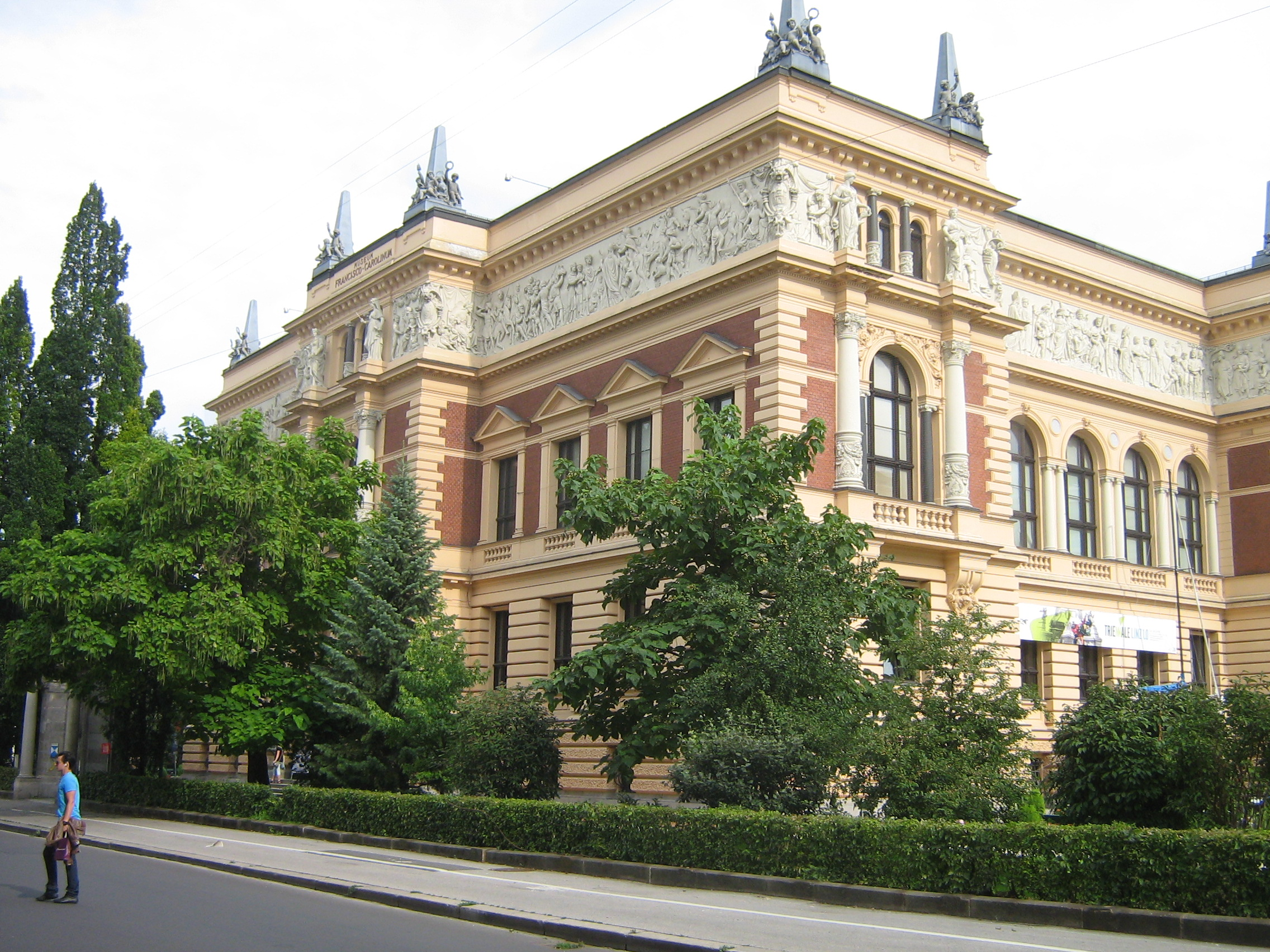
Regional gallery

- At the headquarters of the Upper Austrian art association (Oberösterreichisc her Kunstverein) in the Ursulinenhof in Linz there are regular exhibitions of contemporary art.
- Upper Austrian museum of literature (Oberösterrreischisches Literaturmuseum), the Adalbert Stifter Institute for literature and linguistics and the Upper Austrian house of literature (Oberösterreichisches Literaturhaus) all are situated in the StifterHaus, where Austrian writer, painter and educationalist Adalbert Stifter lived from 1848 to his death in 1868.
- Upper Austrian forum for architecture (Architekturforum Oberösterreich) in the house of architecture (Haus der Architektur) attracts about 6,000 visitors annually. The forum organises lectures, exhibitions, conferences and competitions.

=== Music ===
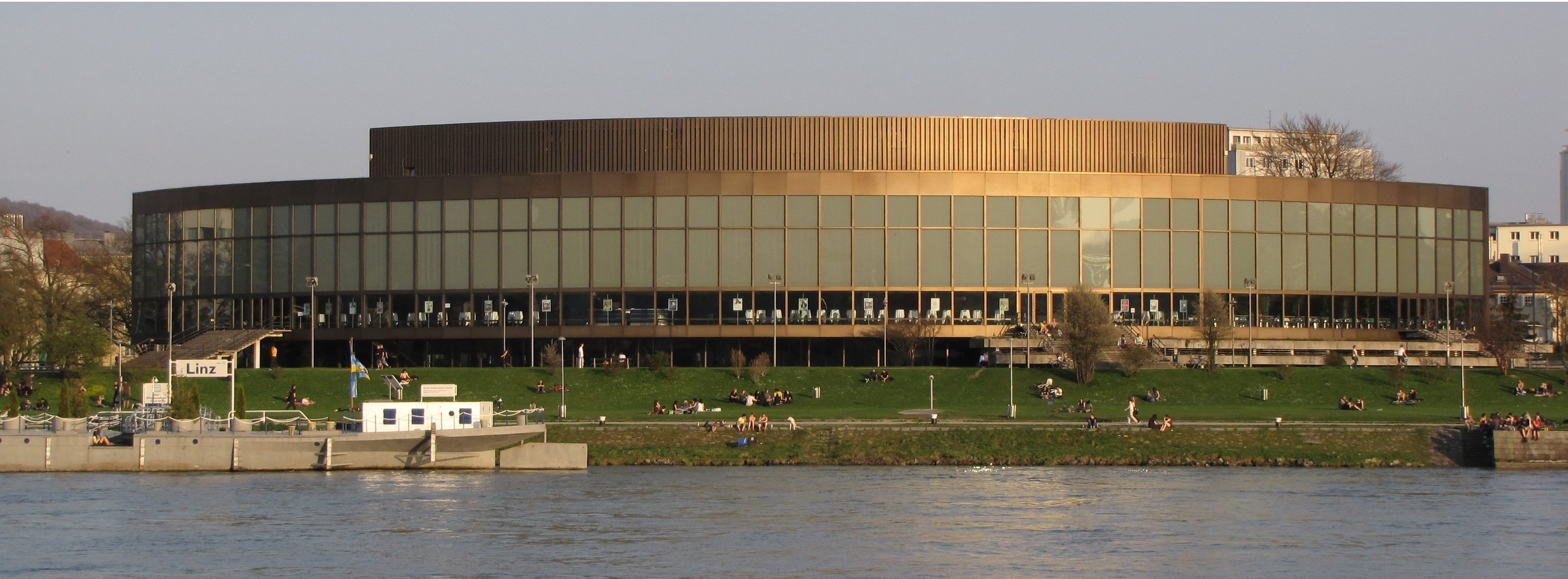
Brucknerhaus

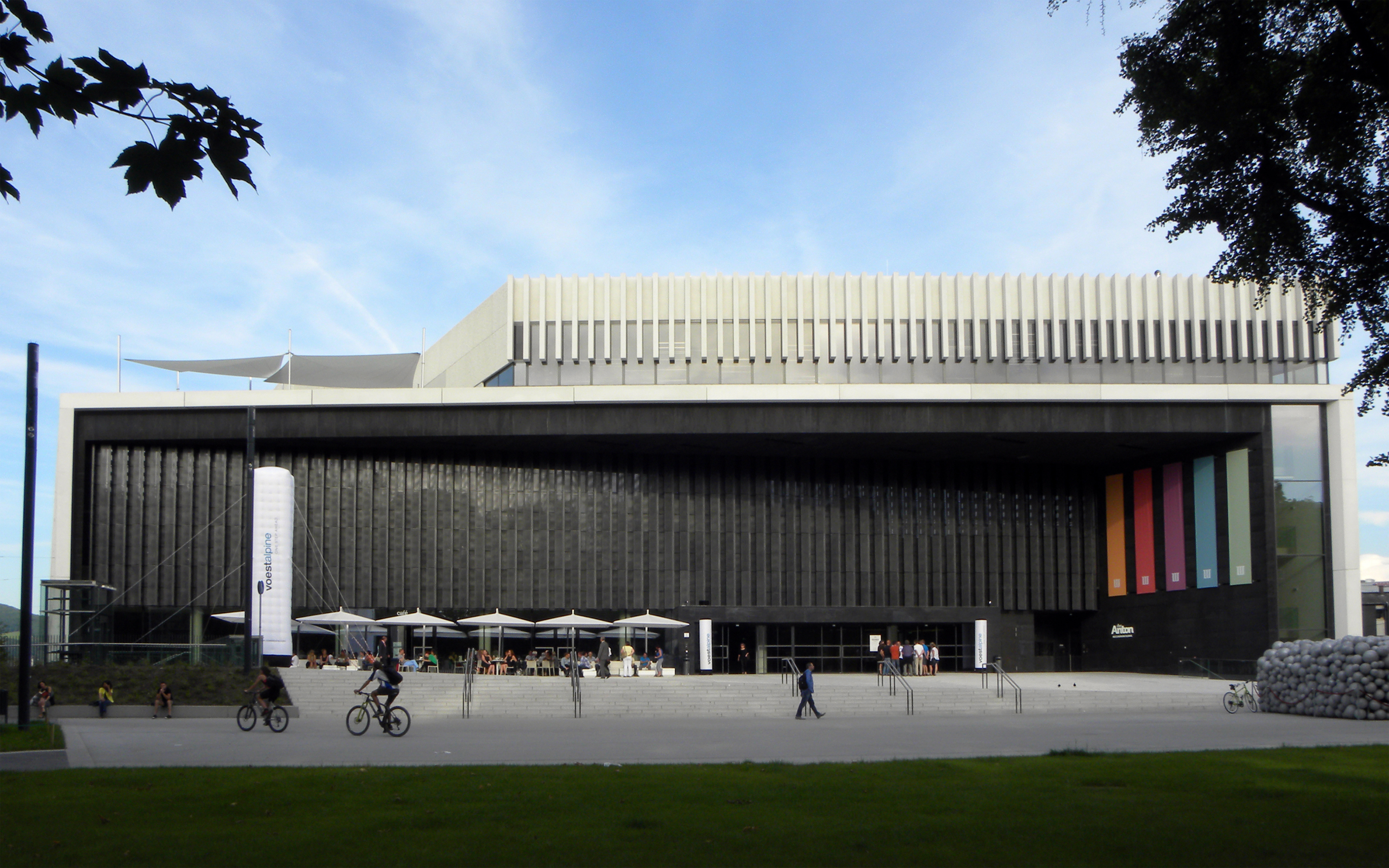
Musiktheater Linz

The Brucknerhaus, a famous concert hall in Linz is named after Anton Bruckner. It is situated just some 200 metres away from the "Lentos". It is home to the "Bruckner Orchestra", and is frequently used for concerts, as well as balls and other events. It is also the venue of the "Linz Fest" which takes place annually in May as well as one of the venues during the Ars Electronica Festival in early September. In June, July and August the "Musikpavillon" is placed in the park where musical groups of different styles perform on Thursdays, Fridays, Saturdays and Sundays free of charge.

The Musiktheater (music theatre) was opened in April 2013 and is considered to be one of the most modern opera houses in Europe. It offers five stages of varying sizes; the big hall ("Großer Saal") with 1,200 seats, the BlackBox with up to 270 seats, the BlackBoxLounge with up to 150 seats, the orchestra hall ("Orchestersaal") with up to 200 seats and another stage in the foyer ("FoyerBühne"). Performances at the Musiktheater include operas and typically Austrian operettas, ballets and musicals.

The ensemble of the Landestheater (regional theatre) Linz used to perform musical productions as well as theatre productions at a venue located on the "Promenade" in the inner city of Linz (this venue is still referred to simply as "Landestheater"). Since the opening of the new Musiktheater, only theatre performances take place at the "Promenade" venue, whereas musical productions are shown in the Musiktheater. The Landestheater Linz is especially renowned for its theatre for young audiences called u\hof:.

The Posthof is one of the biggest event centres in Linz with three rooms offering up to 630 seats or standing room for about 1,200 people respectively in the big hall. The programme focuses on contemporary art and covers concerts, theatre, cabaret, dance and literature. Artists from Linz are regularly invited to improve the local cultural scene; e.g. bands from Linz get the opportunity to play as pre-bands alongside nationally and internationally known artists. Altogether a total of about 250 events take place at the Posthof each year with a total number of visitors of about 80.000.

The Stadtwerkstatt is an independent association for culture and was founded in 1979. Its headquarters is located in the Urfahr district on the north bank of the Danube close to the Ars Electronica Centre and serves as venue for music events and other artistic and cultural activities. Situated at the same address is the Stadtwerkstatt's own Café Strom café/bar.

=== Cinema ===
The history of cinema and film begins in Linz in September 1896, when, as part of a variety programme, a film programme was shown in "Roithner's vaudeville" for the first time in Upper Austria. Until the next screening of a film it took until 20 March 1897, when Johann Bläser's travelling cinema guested in the "Hotel of the Golden Ship".

Until the opening of the first cinemas with regular programme, it took till the end of the year 1908. At that time, Karl Lifka opened his "Lifka's Grand Théâtre électrique" in that building, where already the very first film showing took place. Subsequently, the second cinema of Linz was opened a few months later.

As the owner of travelling cinemas, Johann Bläser, got settled in Linz, he bought the "Hotel of the Golden Ship", and installed a cinema in it, the "Bio-Kinematograph". The third stationary cinema, called "Kino Kolloseum", in town was founded around 1910 by the vaudeville operator Karl Roithner. Its first location was the former festival hall at Hessenplatz.

The Linz International Short Film Festival is the first film festival in Upper Austria to focus on international short films. It launched in October 2018 at the Moviemento in Linz, showing 114 films over four days. The concept goes back to the festival director Parisa Ghasemi.

=== Culinary specialties ===
In Linz there are both traditional restaurants and old wine taverns, as well as modern and exotic cuisine. The influence of 140 nations can be felt in Linz's culinary offerings. A coalition of over 40 restaurants, cafes and among other locations bars are called "hotspots". Moreover, Linz has several à la carte restaurants and Gault Millau gourmet restaurants.

Typical dishes in Linz include not only the famous Linzer torte but also knödel and strudel in many different kinds of variations. Another specialty is the erdäpfelkäs, a spread made from mashed potatoes and cream. Some well-known chefs from Linz are Lukas Erich, who cooks in the Verdi and Georg Essig from the Der neue Vogelkäfig.

=== Regular events ===
- Ars Electronica Festival: the Ars Electronica Festival is a festival for media art which has been taking place annually in Linz since 1986 and includes exhibitions, concerts, performances, symposia and interventions on changing themes that take place in public settings such as churches and industrial halls. The events focus on art, technology and society and the nexus among them. In 2015 about 92,000 visitors attended the Ars Electronica Festival. The topic in 2016 was "RADICAL ATOMS and the alchemists of our time". In 2017 the festival took place under the theme "Artificial Intelligence—The Alter Ego". The festival takes place in different public spaces and is considered to be a confrontation with and in the public sphere.
- Black Humour Festival: Every two years in May, the Festival of Black Humour with guests from all over Europe takes place in the Posthof in Linz.
- Bubble Days: the Bubble Days have been taking place annually in June since 2011 and are hosted by local creative collective LI.K.I.DO. During the event a number of extreme sports shows, such as aviation performances and a wake boarding contest, the Red Bull WAKE OF STEEL, take place in the harbour of Linz. Additionally there are a number of art exhibitions and live music acts and visitors can explore the harbour on boat tours, in paddle boats or kayaks. In 2013 the Bubble Days reached a total number of 12,000 visitors.
- Christkindlmärkte: Christmas markets at Hauptplatz and Volksgarten.
- Crossing Europe Film Festival: Since 2004 this festival takes place annually in Linz. Starting at a total number of 9,000 visitors in the first year, the tenth edition of the Crossing Europe Film Festival in 2014 attracted over 20,000 people; 184 feature films, documentaries and short films from 37 countries were shown. The film screenings are accompanied by exhibitions, talks and live music acts ("Nightline"). There are currently eight different awards to be won at the Crossing Europe Film Festival in categories such as "CROSSING EUROPE Audience Award", the "FEDEORA AWARD for European Documentaries" and the "CROSSING EUROPE AWARD Local Artist".
- Donau in Flammen (Danube in Flames): Annual music fireworks from June to August in Upper Austria on the banks of the Danube, accompanied by a broad supporting program.
- Festival der Regionen (Festival of the regions): The festival of the regions focuses on contemporary local art and culture and takes place every second year in varying locations across Upper Austria. It took place for the first time in 1993 and has been dedicated to different themes such as "the other", "marginal zones" or "normality".
- Höhenrausch: Höhenrausch is an annual art project that was developed in 2009. As part of the DonauArt, an inter-institutional cultural project, Höhenrausch 2018 is under the motto "The other shore". The element of water is worked on by international artists, with the definition of the shore being the focus of artistic exploration. Diverse spaces and places underline the presentation of this project.
- International Brucknerfest: Following the opening of the "Brucknerhaus" concert hall in Linz three years earlier, the international Brucknerfest took place for the first time in 1977. Whereas the first two editions were only dedicated to classical music in general and Anton Bruckner's pieces in particular, this changed in 1979 when the international Brucknerfest, the Ars Electronica festival and the "Klangwolke" (sound cloud), which now marks the beginning of the Brucknerfest, were merged to create a festival worthy of competing with those in Vienna and Salzburg. Taking place annually for three weeks in September/October it closes the Austrian festival season.
- Kinderfilmfestival (Kids' Film Festival): The international children's film festival is organized by the Kinderfreunde Oberösterreich. Films are shown in the original version while being live synchronised by an actor. The 29th festival will supposedly take place in November 2017.
- Kinderkulturwoche (Children's Week of Culture): The children's culture week has been taking place regularly since 2013 with plays, workshops, intro courses for children and teenagers.
- Klangwolke (Cloud of sound): Created as a link between the Ars Electronica Festival and the international Brucknerfest, this open-air multimedia musical event takes place annually at the beginning of September at the riverside Donaupark in Linz. It is free of charge and attracted about 110,000 people in 2013. Today there are three different "Clouds of sound", the visualised Klangwolke, in which modern music (mostly commissioned works) is staged with lasers, video projections, fireworks, ships, cranes, balloons, etc., the Klangwolke for children (since 1998) and the classical Klangwolke.
- Linzfest: This open air festival has taken place in Linz since 1990. It is financed by the city of Linz and several sponsors and organised for the broad public of all ages in cooperation with partners such as local cultural institutions. The festival is dedicated to a different theme every year (the last one in 2014 was "Old is the new new") and includes concerts, theatre, dance, comedy, art in the public space, culinary art, literature and parties, all of which are in line with the general theme of the event. It is held in the "Donaupark", a wide park area next to the Danube, also referred to as "Donaulände" or "Kulturmeile".
- Lido Sounds: a three-days-festival with various music styles at the Danube riverside.
- Pflasterspektakel: The festival takes place annually since 1986 in the city centre of Linz and includes musical acts, juggling, acrobatics, pantomime, improvisational theatre, clownery, fire dancing, painting, samba parades, as well as a programme for children. With about 250,000 visitors (2014) the festival is one of the biggest street art festivals in Europe; its 28th edition featured 300 artists from 36 different nations.
- The Stadtfest (City festival) is held annually in August in the inner city of Linz. The three-day festival features live music acts of different styles, with each music style being represented on a different stage. The concerts are held by national and international artists. Every year about 100,000 people take part in this event.
- Linz Open: A pofessional WTA women's tennis tournament in Linz that has been an established part of the city’s sporting calendar since 1991, when it was first held there . Initially classified as a Tier V tournament, it was upgraded to Tier III in 1993 and Tier II in 1998. In 2009, it became a WTA International tournament, a designation replaced by WTA 250 in 2021 following changes to the tour’s classification system. It was subsequently upgraded to WTA 500 status in 2024, further strengthening Linz’s presence on the international women’s tennis circuit.

=== Archives ===
- Archive of the city of Linz: collection of important documents of the city of Linz, presenting Linz' town history
- Atelierhaus Salzamt: living and working space for artists, featuring continuous exhibitions.
- Botanic garden: about 100,000 visitors every year; featuring a summer programme of music acts, readings and dance performances in the garden pavilion
- Donaupark Linz: contains sculptures by national and international artists such as Herbert Bayer, Max Bill and David Rabinowitch. The original idea of this project, called 'forum metall', by Helmuth Gsöllpointner and Peter Baum, was to set an example of Linz as an art metropolis with sculptures symbolizing a fusion of art and economy.

=== Commemorative year 2018 ===
The project "Linz 1938/1918", which started on 29 June 2018, commemorates the 100th anniversary of the founding of the Republic (1918) and 80 years of "political union" (1938). With this installation in the public space, presented in the city center, Linz fulfills its responsibility and commitment to maintaining peace with its declaration, making a contribution to dealing with the past. The idea is to reach people who have little relation to the years of 1918 or 1938.

== Politics ==
The municipal council consists of 61 members. Following the 2021 Upper Austrian local elections, the seat distribution is as follows:

- Social Democratic Party of Austria (SPÖ): 22 seats
- Austrian People's Party (ÖVP): 11 seats
- The Greens - The Green Alternative (GRÜNE): 10 seats
- Freedom Party of Austria (FPÖ): 9 seats
- NEOS - The New Austria and Liberal Forum (NEOS): 2 seats
- People - Freedom - Fundamental Rights (MFG): 2 seats
- Communist Party of Austria (KPÖ): 2 seats
- Linz Plus (LINZ): 2 seats
- Change (WANDL): 1 seat

The mayor of Linz, Dietmar Prammer (SPÖ), was elected in 2025, defeating Michael Raml (FPÖ) in the run-off election.

== Colleges and universities ==
- The Johannes Kepler University Linz is situated in the north-east of Linz, and hosts law, business, social sciences, medicine, engineering and science faculties; about 24,000 students (2023/2024) are enrolled. A spin-off of the university, as well as a Fachhochschule for various computer-related studies (polytechnic) is located 20 mi (32 km) north of Linz in the small town of Hagenberg im Mühlkreis.
- University of Art and Design Linz, public, for arts and industrial design; 1,328 students (2016/2017)
- Fachhochschule Oberösterreich, Campus Linz; 879 students (2017/2018)
- Anton Bruckner Private University for music, acting and dance; 871 students (2017/2018)
- Educational college Oberösterreich; approx. 3,000 students
- Educational college Diocese of Linz
- Catholic Private University Linz; 341 students (2017/2018), which has been a Papal faculty since 1978
- LIMAK Austrian Business School
- KMU Akademie AG (Middlesex University London)

== Parks and gardens ==
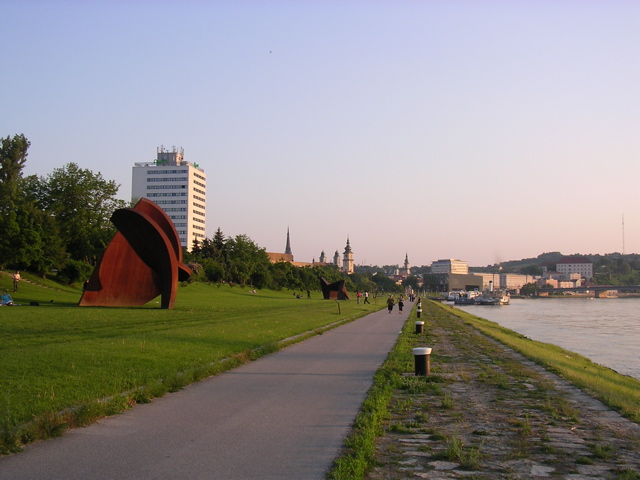
Donaulände

- Lakes and public swimming pools: Pichlinger See, Pleschinger See, Weikerlsee, Biesenfeldbad, Hummelhofbad, Parkbad, Schörgenhubbad. One of the first public swimming pools was the former "Fabriksarm", a Danube branch stream (from Parkbad to Winterhafen) that was filled up in 1890. Afterwards a makeshift at the "Obere Donaulände" was built, which existed until a flood in 1954. In 1901 the "Städtische Schwimmschule" (city swimming school) was built at the place of the former Parkbad.
- Botanischer Garten: About 100,000 visitors are attracted by Botanischer Garten, which makes it one of the most visited sights of the city since 1952. Situated at Bauernberg, and comprising 4.2 hectares, the arrangement distinguishes by its harmonious design, its abundance of plant species (about 8,000 different types in culture) and the multifaceted cultural and event programme.
- Donaulände or "Lände": public park on the Danube between Lentos and the Brucknerhaus. In summer, the Donaulände is a common meeting point among young people living in Linz. It also hosts the Linzer Klangwolke.
- Freinberg: a public park frequented by families and joggers.
- Pfenningberg: Pfenningberg is a part of the northeastern green belt directioning to Steyregg. It overlooks the port facilities and the grounds of the VÖEST.
- Wasserwald: Big Park (approximately 1 km^{2} (0.39 sq mi)) in the south of Linz. The park is located in the district of Kleinmünchen, where large waterworks are situated. The most frequent visitors are walkers, joggers, Nordic walkers and dog owners, who enjoy the idyllic atmosphere of the park. The park is equipped with well-maintained sidewalks, playgrounds, two toboggan hills, a fitness trail, a running track and a senior park with chess. Furthermore, two public toilets are available.
- Stadtpark: On 22 August 2003, the new Linz City Park between Huemer-, Museum-, Noßberger- and Körnerstraße was officially opened. With 10,807 square metres of green area, it is the second largest inner-city park. The city of Linz has acquired this area due to a barter with the Austrian postal service. Since Schiller Park in 1909, there has been no newly opened park of this magnitude in the centre of Linz.
- Landschaftspark Bindermichl-Spallerhof: In the first phase of the establishment of the 8.3 -hectare sized area, which reconnects the boroughs Bindermichl and Spallerhof, the province of Upper Austria was responsible for the expansion of the park. The park replaces the urban motorway, which runs subterranean in this area since 2006. Old paths were re-established and until mid 2007 the city's gardeners designed prethe new parkland with 550 trees and various shrubs, perennials and flower beds.
- Linzer Zoo: Linz Zoo is located at Pöstlingsberg and is home to around 600 animals from 110 different species on 4 acres (2 ha). In recent years, the zoo was able to increase its visitor numbers continuously. In 2014, about 132,000 visitors visited Linz Zoo.
- Kirchschlag bei Linz ski resort is located 15 km north of Linz and has three ski lifts: The Hauslift, the Waldlift or the Babylift. The special features of the ski area include the "How fast am I – route" which automatically measures the time or the night skiing. The ski area also has a 2 km long cross-country ski run, a curling ground and a nature ice rink.

== Notable people ==
=== Public service and thinking ===
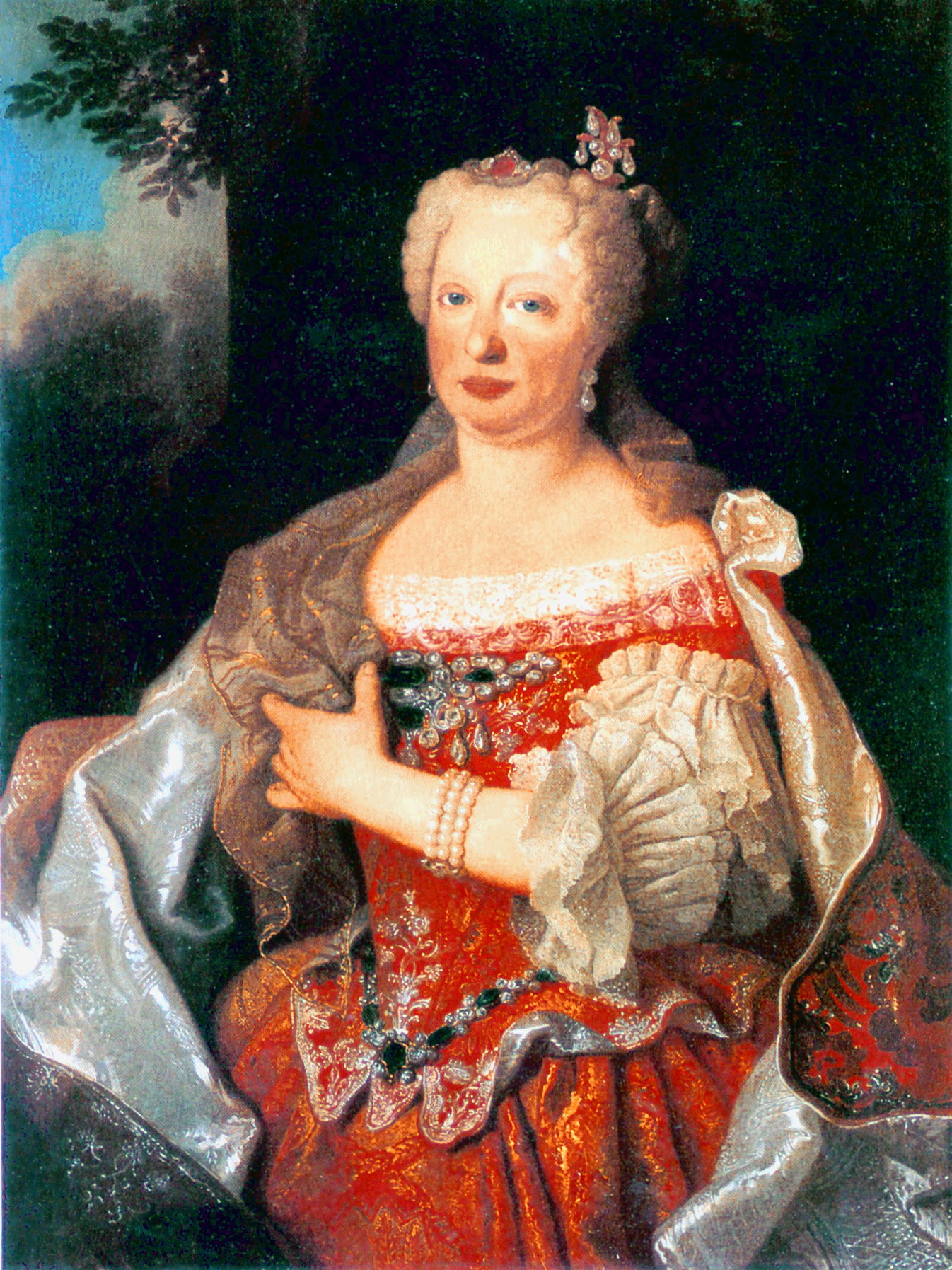
Mary Anne of Austria c. 1729

- Ferdinand II, Archduke of Austria (1529–1595), second son of Ferdinand I, Holy Roman Emperor
- Johann Grueber (1623–1680), Austrian Jesuit missionary and astronomer in China, and noted explorer
- Xavier Ehrenbert Fridelli (1673–1743), Austrian Jesuit missionary and cartographer in China
- Archduchess Maria Elisabeth of Austria (1680–1741), governor of the Austrian Netherlands, 1725–1741
- Ludwig Andreas von Khevenhüller (1683–1744), prominent Austrian field marshal
- Maria Anna of Austria (1683–1754), queen consort of Portugal
- Johann Amadeus von Thugut (1736–1818), Austrian diplomat
- Stefanie Nauheimer (1868–1946), feminist
- Ute Bock (1942–2018), Austrian educator, ran projects helping asylum seekers
- Herwig van Staa (born 1942), politician (ÖVP), former governor of Tyrol
- Shlomo Sand (born 1946), professor of history at Tel Aviv University and author of the controversial book The Invention of the Jewish People
- Christine Mayr-Lumetzberger (born 1956), former Benedictine nun who was excommunicated from the Roman Catholic Church
- Volker Türk (born 1965), lawyer and the United Nations high commissioner for Human Rights since 2022
- Verena Madner (born 1965), legal scholar, professor and constitutional judge

=== The arts ===
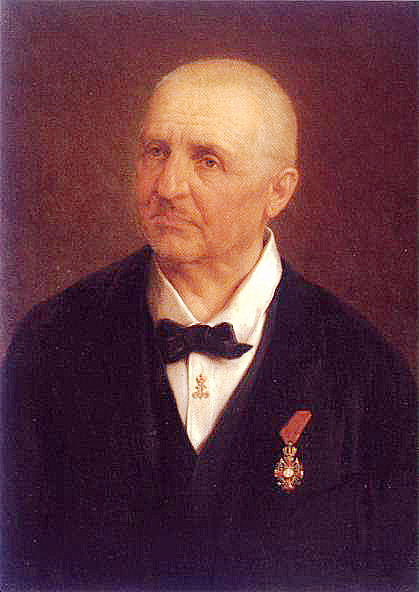
Anton Bruckner

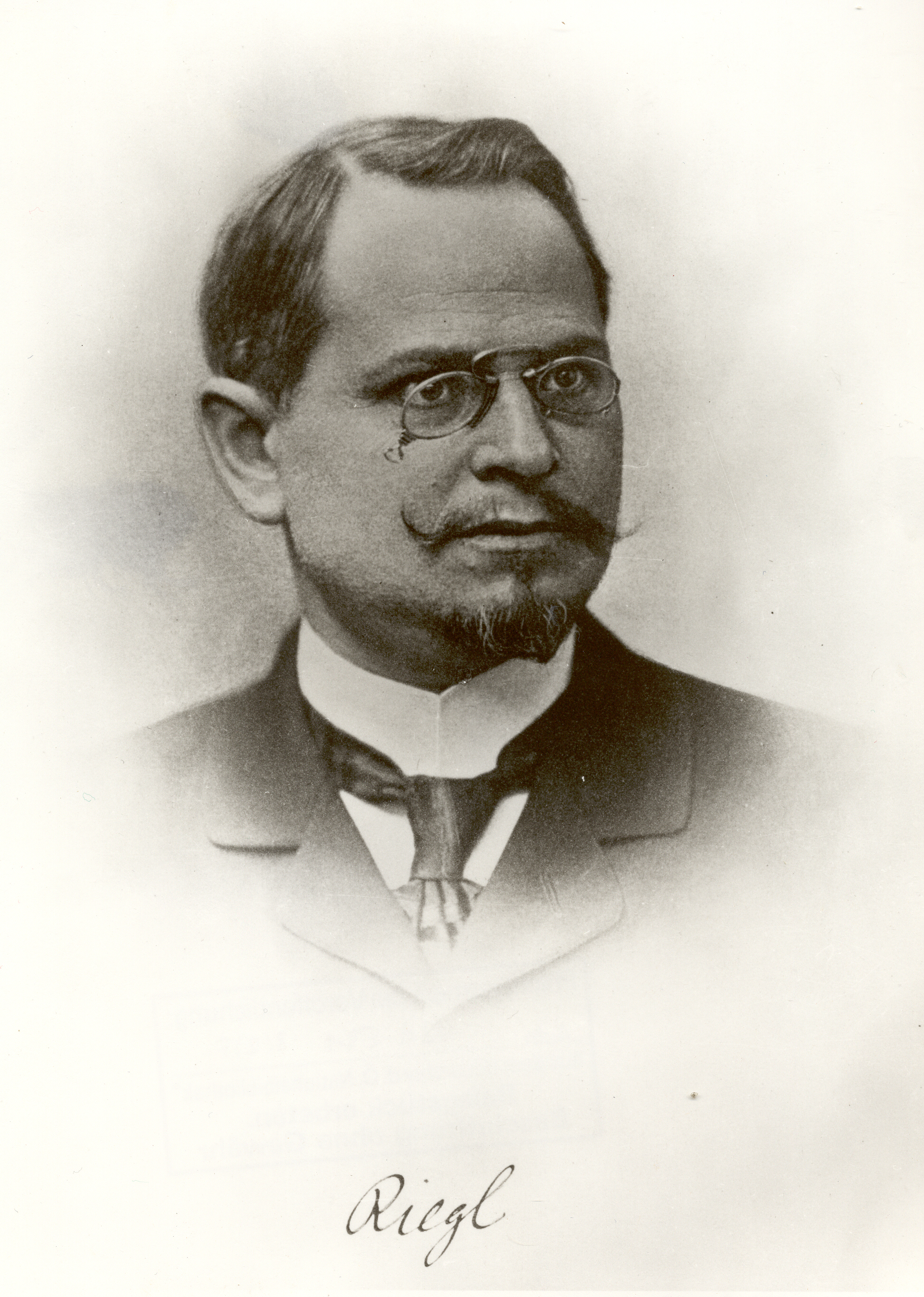
Alois Riegl c. 1890

- Joseph Anton Feuchtmayer (1696–1770), Rococo stuccoist and sculptor
- Marianne von Willemer (1784–1860), actress and dancer, knew Johann Wolfgang von Goethe, appears in his poetry
- Anton Bruckner (1824–1896), Austrian composer and organist of symphonies and sacred music
- Ida Pellet (1838–1863), German classical actress
- Alois Riegl (1858–1905), Austrian art historian, considered a member of the Vienna School of Art History
- Hermann Bahr (1863–1934), writer, playwright, director and critic
- Richard Tauber (1891–1948), Austrian lyric tenor and film actor
- Fritz Eckhardt (1907–1995), actor, director and writer
- Alexandr Hackenschmied (1907–2004), photographer, film director, cinematographer and film editor
- Othmar Wessely (1922–1998), musicologist
- Igo Hofstetter (1926–2002), Austrian operetta composer
- Alfred Peschek (1929–2015), composer and musician
- Waltraut Cooper (born 1937), artist, pioneer of digital art
- Valie Export (born 1940), avant-garde Austrian artist
- Frank Elstner (born 1942), presenter on German television
- Fritz von Thurn und Taxis (born 1950), Austrian sportscaster
- Anton Koschany (born 1953), Canadian news producer, W5
- Kurt Hentschlager (born 1960), visual artist
- Franz Welser-Möst (born 1960), music director of the Cleveland Orchestra and the Vienna State Opera
- Paul Haslinger (born 1962), musician and composer
- Fritz Schmid (born 1972), theater performer, operatic singer
- Birgit Minichmayr (born 1977), actress
- Teresa Präauer (born 1979), Austrian writer and visual artist
- Marco Krainer (born 1981), Austrian specialty and TV chef with connections to the United States
- Marcus Füreder (born 1974), producer, DJ
- Irene Kepl (born 1982), Austrian violinist and composer
- Christina Stürmer (born 1982), Austrian pop/rock singer

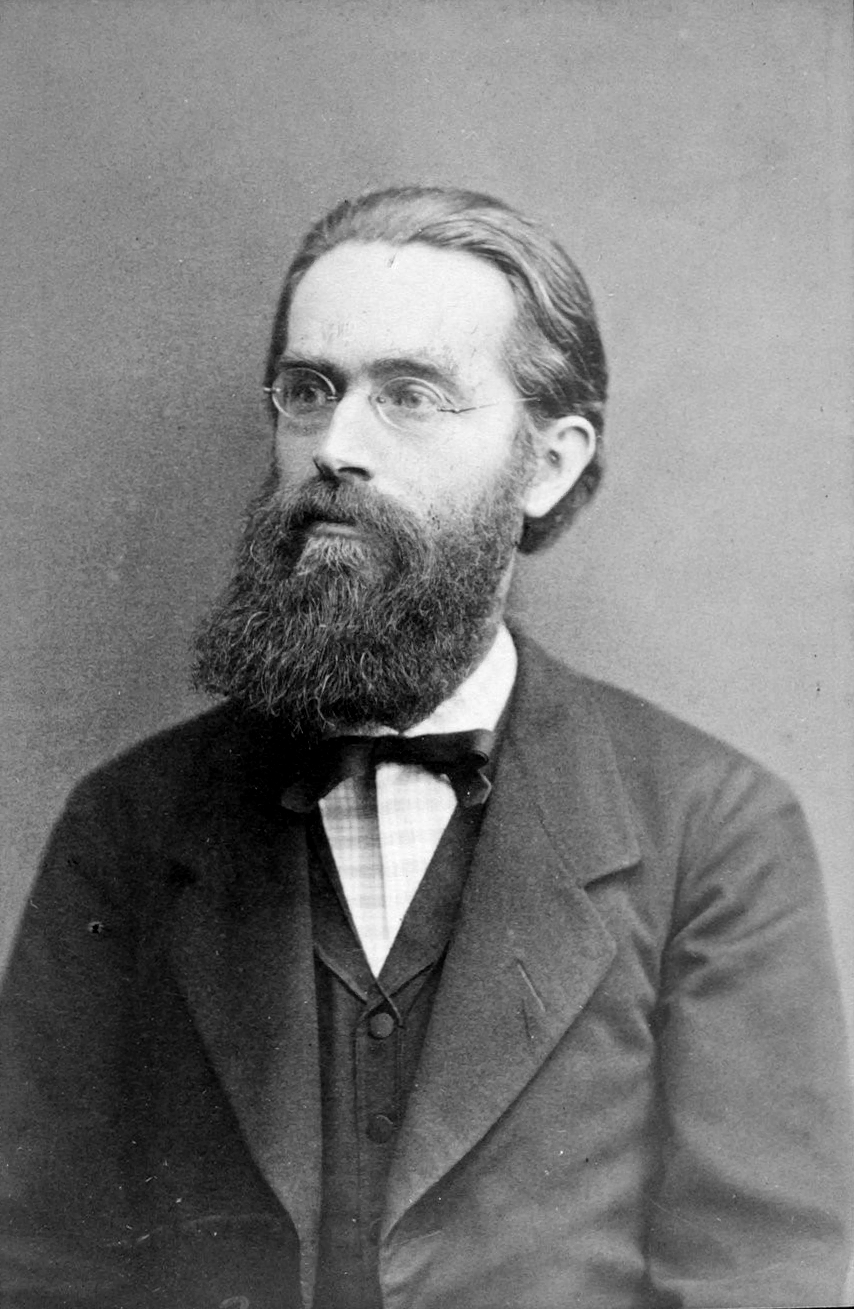
Julius von Hann, 1885

=== Science & business ===
- Julius von Hann (1839–1921), Austrian meteorologist; seen as a father of modern meteorology
- Andreas Reischek (1845–1902), Austrian taxidermist, naturalist, ornithologist and grave robber
- Hans Kronberger (1920–1970), British nuclear physicist
- Paul Achleitner (born 1956), banker and businessman
- Reinhard Rieger (1943–2006), Austrian zoologist

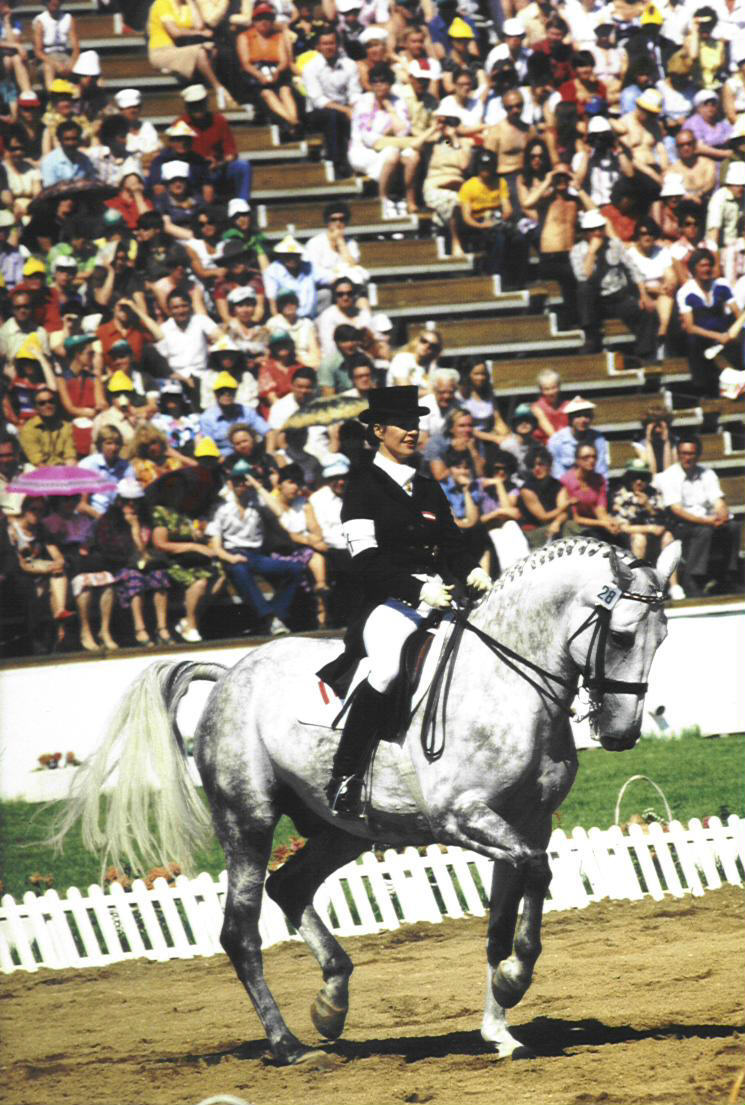
Elisabeth Theurer and Mon Cherie, 1980

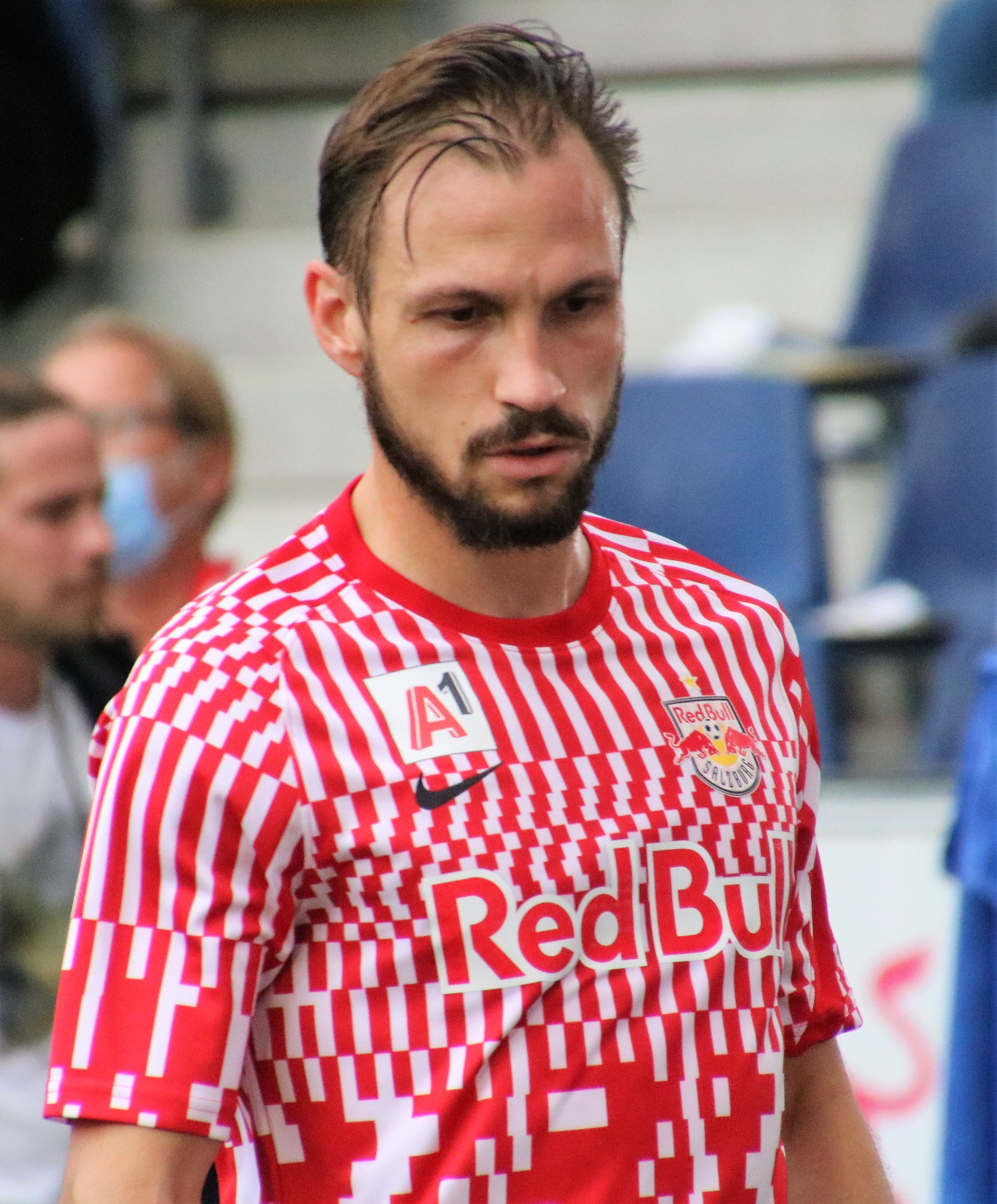
Andreas Ulmer, 2021

=== Sport ===
- Viktor Kalisch (1902–1976), sprint canoeist and silver medallist at the 1936 Summer Olympics
- Adolf Kainz (1903–1948), sprint canoeist and gold medallist at the 1936 Summer Olympics
- Karl Steinhuber (1906–2002), sprint canoeist, silver medallist at the 1936 Summer Olympics
- Erika Mahringer (1924–2018), Austrian alpine skier, two time bronze medallist at the 1948 Winter Olympics
- Walter Oswald (born 1955), former footballer who played over 510 games
- Elisabeth Theurer (born 1956), equestrienne, gold medallist in the 1980 Summer Olympics – Individual dressage
- Klaus Lindenberger (born 1957), former football player and coach, he played 430 games and 43 for Austria
- Franz Schumann (born 1960), professional wrestler
- Herwig Drechsel (born 1973) retired football player who played over 460 games
- Vera Lischka (born 1977), breaststroke swimmer and politician (SPÖ)
- Sybille Bammer (born 1980), tennis player
- Andreas Ulmer (born 1985), footballer who has played 394 games and 32 for Austria
- Florian Klein (born 1986), footballer who has played over 440 games
- Niklas Hoheneder (born 1986), football coach and former defender who played over 390 games
- Heinz Lindner (born 1990), football goalkeeper who has played over 390 games and 36 for Austria
- Gernot Trauner (born 1992), footballer who has played over 290 games and 10 for Austria
- Mateo Kovačić (born 1994), Croatian footballer, played 370 games and 97 for Croatia
- Xaver Schlager (born 1997), footballer who has played over 220 games and 42 for Austria
- Thomas Preining (born 1998), racing driver

=== Living/lived in Linz ===
- János Batsányi (1763 in Tapolca – 1845 in Linz), Hungarian poet
- Adalbert Stifter (1805, Oberplan – 1868, Linz), Bohemian-Austrian writer, poet, painter, and pedagogue
- Daniel Graves (born in Los Angeles, California) of Aesthetic Perfection
- Adolf Hitler (1889, Braunau am Inn – 1945, Berlin), Führer of Germany
- Doug Hammond (born in Tampa, Florida, 1942), American free funk/avant-garde jazz drummer, composer, poet and producer
- Andrew Edge (born in Leeds, England, 1956), musician, moved to Linz in the late 1980s

== Twin towns – sister cities ==
Linz is twinned with:

- Albufeira, Portugal (2008)
- Brașov, Romania (2012)
- České Budějovice, Czech Republic (1987)
- Charlottenburg-Wilmersdorf (Berlin), Germany (1995)
- Chengdu, China (1983)
- Dodoma, Tanzania (2019)
- Eskişehir, Turkey (2012)
- Gwangyang, South Korea (1991)
- Halle, Germany (1975)
- Kansas City, United States (1988)
- Linköping, Sweden (1995)
- Linz am Rhein, Germany (1987)
- Modena, Italy (1992)
- Nasushiobara, Japan (2009)
- Nizhny Novgorod, Russia (1993)
- Norrköping, Sweden (1995)
- San Carlos, Nicaragua (1988)
- Tampere, Finland (1995)
- Tuzla, Bosnia and Herzegovina (2014)
- Zaporizhia, Ukraine (1983)
- Sumgait, Azerbaijan (2009)

A previous town-twinning established in 1977 with Gabès, Tunisia was ended in 2016 due to lack of contact.

== See also ==
- Linzer torte
- List of mayors of Linz
- Oberösterreich
- Freinberg (Linz)
- List of cities and towns on the river Danube
