= Freinberg (Linz) =

Mountain located in the urban area of Upper Austria

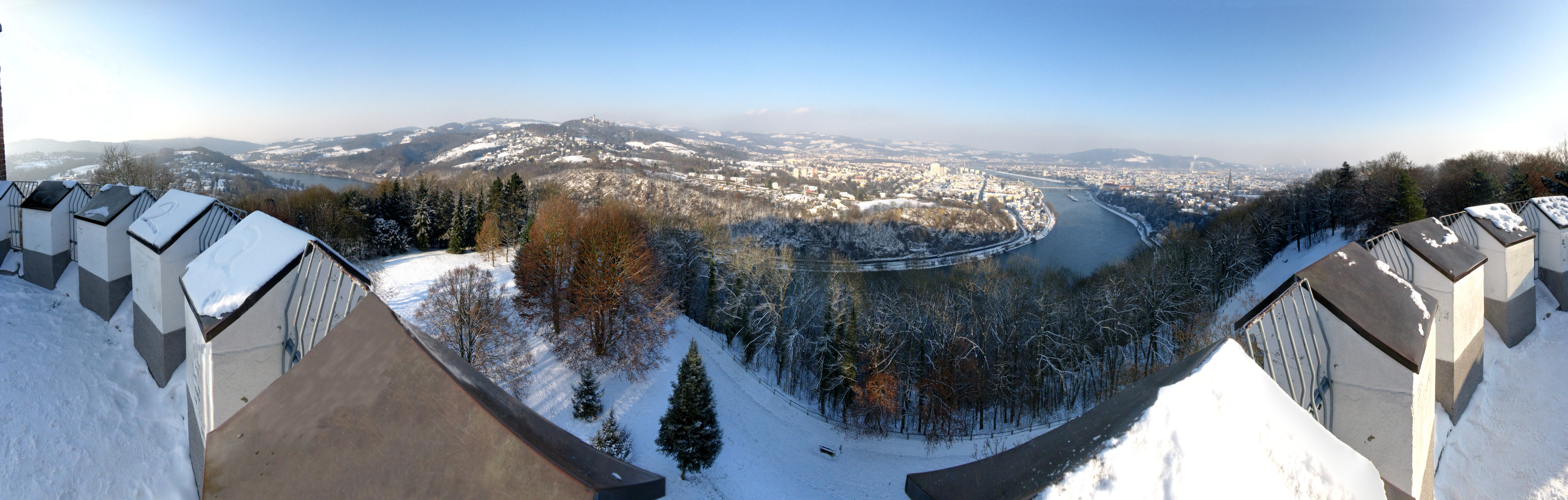
- View of the Danube Valley from the Franz Josef Warte on the Freinberg

Highest point
- Elevation: 405 ft (123 m)
- Prominence: 80 m (260 ft)
- Coordinates: 48°18′13″N 14°15′50″E

Geography
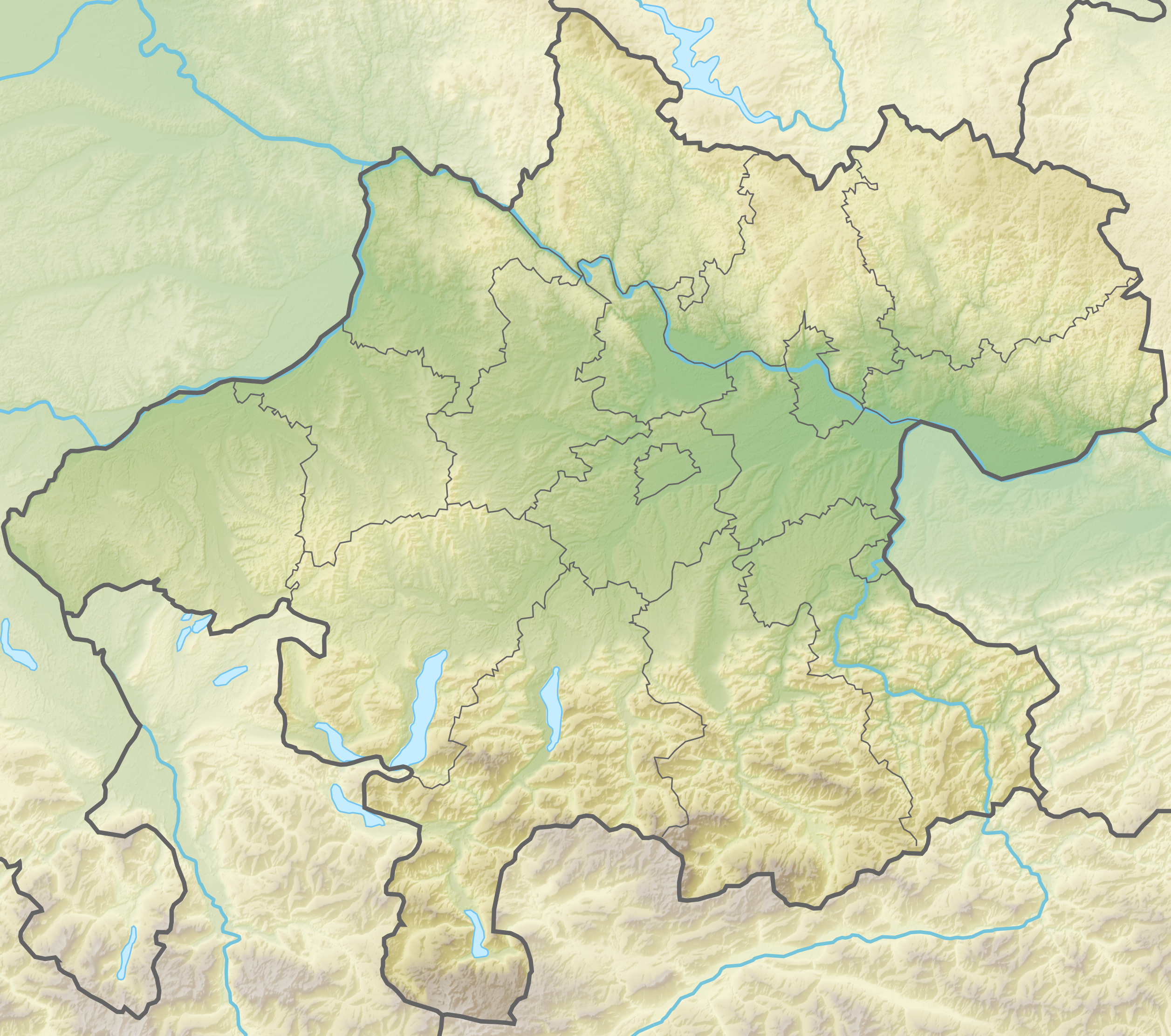
- Location within Upper Austria
- Location: Upper Austria, Austria

Climbing
- Normal route: Hike

The Freinberg is a mountain with an elevation of 405 meters above sea level, situated in the urban area of the Upper Austrian capital, Linz. Historically, this mountain plateau and the forested ridge to the south were known by different names, including Galgenberg and Jägermayrwald. The Freinberg offers panoramic views of almost the entire city of Linz.

The mountain was named in 1910 after the statistical district Freinberg of the Linz district Waldegg. The Freinberg statistical district is located on the southern spur of this ridge.

== Location ==
Geologically, the Freinberg is classified as a spur of the Kürnberg and belongs to the Bohemian Massif. This rump mountain range extends from the Czech Republic into adjacent areas of Austria, Germany, and Poland.

The highest point of the Freinberg is located about two kilometers west of the city center of Linz. It lies in the statistical district of Römerberg-Margarethen, which surrounds the mountain's west and east sides. To the south, the mountain slope borders the statistical district of Freinberg, particularly along areas like Anemonenweg, Edelweißberg, and Römerstraße. Development and access to the mountain occur through this southern district.

The southern reaches of the Freinberg Ridge extend to Römerberg and Mariahilfberg, Bauernberg, Froschberg to Holzheim and Lärchenau.

With its 405 meters height, it is the lowest mountain in Linz Bay. Thus, the Kürnberg is 526 meters, the Pfenningberg 616 meters, and the Pöstlingberg 539 meters high.

The mountain features a triangular plateau that descends from its highest point in the north at 405 meters down to approximately 310 meters in the south. The eastern side of the Freinberg is characterized by a rocky steep slope that descends toward the Danube River. On the western side, the mountain is covered in wooded steep slopes leading to the Zaubertal area. This plateau, covering about 4 hectares, was transformed into a park in the late 18th century.

Freinberg can be reached by bus line 26 of the Linz Linien.

== History ==
In 1453, Emperor Frederick III (1415-1493) granted the city of Linz the authority to administer life and death sentences. Consequently, the city erected gallows on the "peg genant Lützelburg," located to the west of St. Martin's Church. These gallows were situated on the hill in an eastern direction, making them visible from a considerable distance. The name "Freinberg" first appeared in historical documents in 1483. Initially, this name referred exclusively to the area surrounding the "Gut Ast," situated between St. Martin's Church, the Jesuit monastery/Aloisianum, and Jägermayr. The forested hill to the north/northeast of this area was known as the "Galgenberg." After executions ceased to occur, the Galgenberg became known as "Jägermayrberg" and was eventually renamed "Freinberg" in 1910.

The plateau of the "Freinberg" appears to have been inhabited as early as the Late Neolithic period, as evidenced by scattered archaeological finds. Additionally, there is evidence of fortifications dating back to the late Bronze Age.

The plateau was well-suited for settlement due to its natural defenses. The eastern side was naturally protected by the Danube break-off, while the western side featured steep slopes descending into the Zaubertal. To safeguard against potential intruders, a protective wall was built approximately in the middle of the ridge. This wall forms an open V-shape and extends from the western to the eastern slope.

Initially, the protective wall on the "Freinberg" was believed to be of Roman origin, likely due to the discovery of foundation walls from a Roman building in 1888 during the construction of the Franz Josefs-Warte. However, in 1901, when a road was being built to access the control room and it intersected the protective wall, the Linz Museum uncovered evidence that suggested the site dated back to the prehistoric or protohistoric period.

A research project conducted by the Institute for Prehistory and Early History investigated archaeological work on the Freinberg between 1990 and 1996. The excavations revealed that the protective wall had been destroyed by fire three times, indicating that the complex was constructed in four phases. The first three phases occurred during the Late Bronze Age, and the final phase took place during the Late Latène Age. In the last phase, simple stone fixtures were added to the fortifications. The settlement during this period extended beyond the fortified area, covering approximately 2.5 hectares. Archaeological findings included local pottery, imported bronze objects, and coins. Later, the settlement shifted towards Römerberg and Schloßberg, where excavations by the Linz City Museum Nordico uncovered traces of settlement from the end of the late Iron Age to the Roman Imperial period. Archaeologists dated the fortifications to the 11th to 9th centuries B.C., suggesting that Freinberg may have been the first permanently settled site in what is now Linz.

Since the latter half of the 19th century, Freinberg has evolved into a recreational area for the residents of Linz, largely due to the efforts of the "Linzer Verschönerungs-Verein." Several excursion inns were established on and around the mountain during this period. However, with the post-war era and increased mobility in the 1960s, the number of visitors to the area has declined, leading to the closure of some of the traditional inns.

== Park ==
In 1865, the "Linzer Verschönerungs-Verein" (Linz Beautification Association) was founded with the primary goal of providing recreation for the urban population in green spaces. The association, closely associated with the city's municipal council, was responsible for the acquisition and maintenance of green areas. After 75 years of existence, the Linzer Verschönerungs-Verein decided to dissolve itself in 1940.

During its existence, the Verschönerungs-Verein played a significant role in preserving the Jägermayr-/Freinberg area and transforming it into a park for the enjoyment of the general public. Today, the park encompasses approximately 20 hectares and is divided into various sections, including Stadtwäldchen, Galgenberg-/Freinberg-Plateau, Schöne Aussicht, Kaiser Franz Josef Park, Frank Anlagen, Turmleiten, and Holzmann-/Lärchen Wiese.

Within these park sections, several objects or features were present or created over time, some of which are now protected monuments:

=== Gasthof Jägermayrhof ===
The "Jägermayrhäusl," originally believed to be a forester's house dating back to the 16th or 17th century, was first documented in 1741 when it was sold to Wilhering Abbey. From 1762 onwards, it operated as an inn. In 1956, it was repurposed as a shelter for refugees. Since 1959, the Jägermayrhof has served as the educational center of the Chamber of Labor of Upper Austria.

=== Gasthaus zur schönen Aussicht (Inn with a beautiful view) ===
The inn "Zur Schönen Aussicht" was built in 1868 at the northernmost part of the plateau. During that period, visitors could enjoy a panoramic view of 360 degrees. However, in 1970, the inn was demolished, and the land was incorporated into the park.

=== Franz Josef-Warte ===
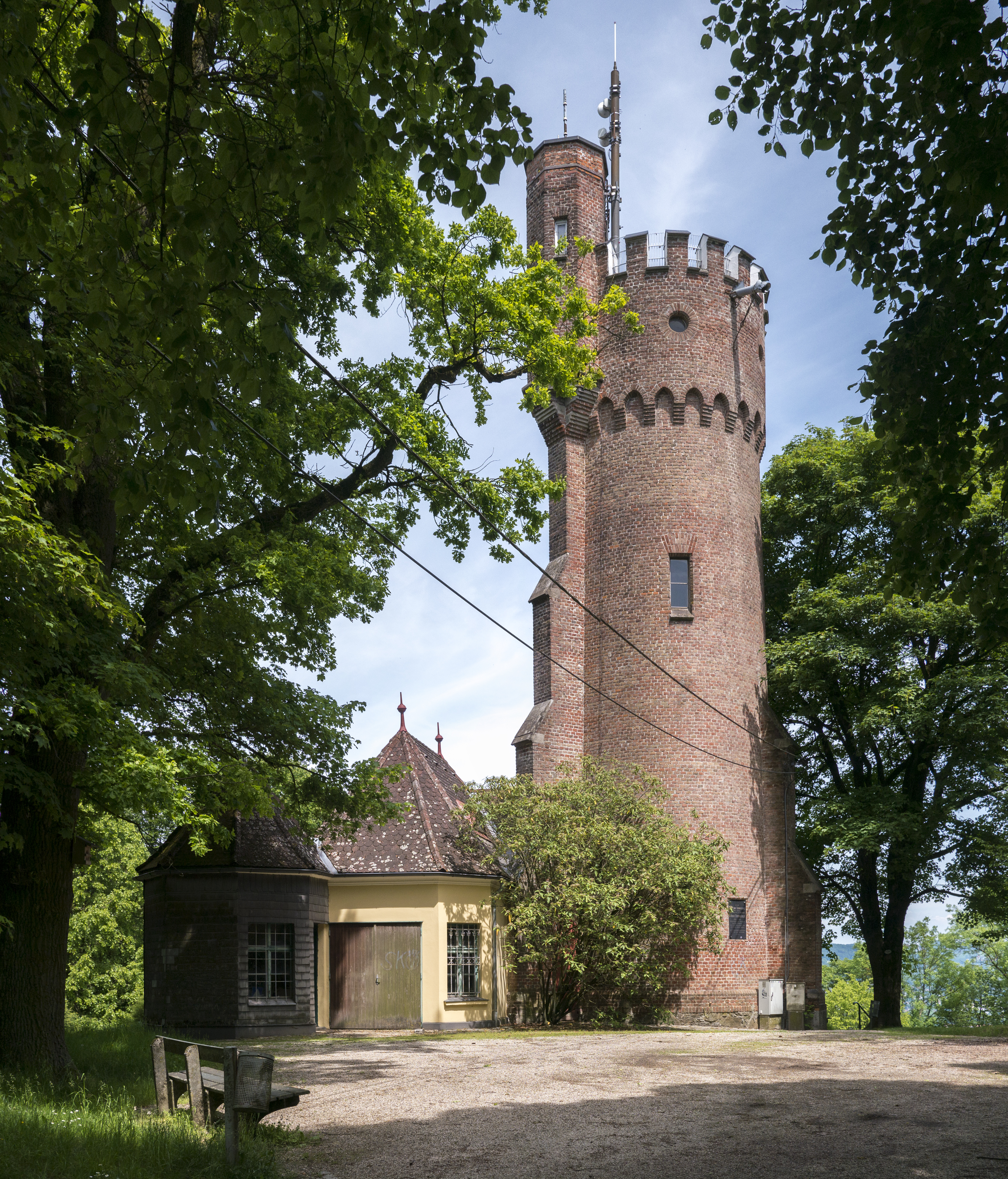
Franz Josef-Warte

In 1873, the Linzer Verschönerungs-Verein (Linz Beautification Society) built a wooden lookout on the site. However, it was dismantled in 1881 due to safety concerns.

From 1883 onwards, the Verschönerungs-Verein worked on the idea of building a new, solidly constructed observation tower on the Jägermayr plateau. After years of careful planning, one of the proposed designs was realized. They built a five-story round tower using exposed masonry construction with brick. The top floor of the tower overhangs the tower wall and is adorned with small pointed arches. Above this floor, there is a viewing platform that is protected by a parapet and provides a 360° panoramic view. Visitors can access the platform via a stair tower attached to an octagonal bay. This bay is supported by a stepped buttress that extends to the ground. Inside the tower, a wooden spiral staircase leads to the five floors.

To commemorate the 40th anniversary of Emperor Franz Josef's reign on December 2, 1888, the tower was named Franz Josef-Warte with "permission from the highest authority" and was officially opened with a ceremonial event on August 3, 1889.

Additionally, in 1912, a one-story extension was added to Franz Josef-Warte, serving as an apartment for the caretaker and guardian of the facility.

=== Elevated tank ===
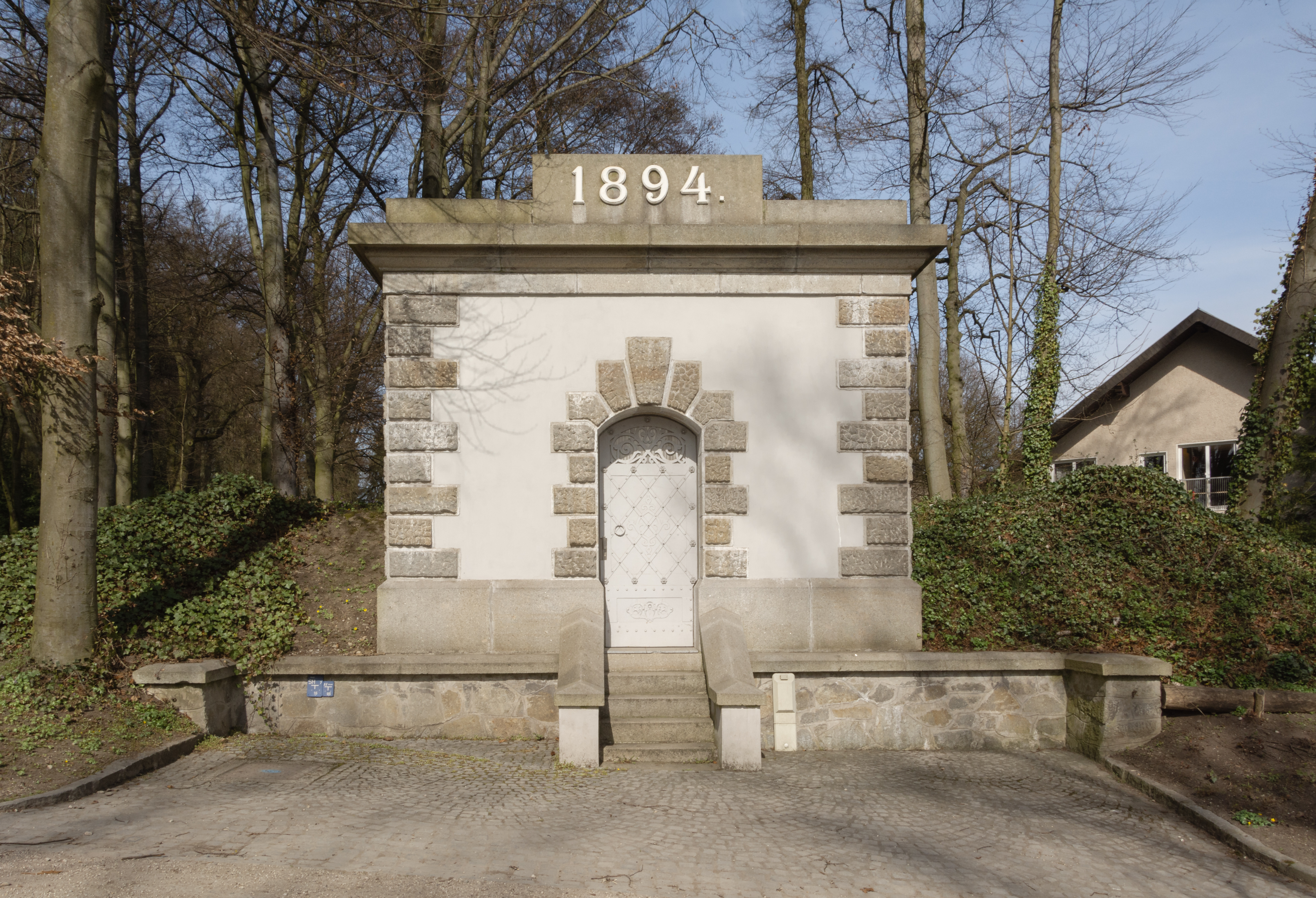
Surge tank Jägermayr

In 1894, the city of Linz built an elevated tank near the Jägermayr Inn. At that time, this tank served as a surge tank and played a crucial role in the city's water supply. This elevated tank, known as the "Jägermayr elevated tank," has a capacity of 100 m³ and is still in operation today.

In 1944, construction began on an additional elevated tank, located above the tank from 1894. However, construction activities had to be halted by the end of the year. It was not until December 1946 that the construction could be completed. This second elevated tank on the Freinberg has a much larger capacity of 1000 m³.

=== Drinking fountain ===
In 1894, in conjunction with the construction of the elevated tank, a drinking fountain was erected at Jägermayr. This small structure features a simple historical design with a hipped roof. In front of it, there is a basket-arched niche housing a water dispenser, and a small fountain bowl is located near the bottom of the structure.

=== Imperial oak ===
To celebrate the 50th anniversary of Emperor Franz Josef's reign, the Verschönerungs-Verein planted an "Imperial Oak" in 1898. This oak was placed at the former location of the wooden lookout post that had been demolished in 1881. The oak was generously donated by the Poschacher Brewery, and a commemorative plaque on an erratic boulder from the Kürnbergerwald was donated by Viktor Drouot, the former mayor of Linz. It was not until 1908 to 1911 that the "Kaiser Franz Josef Park," designed by city gardener Prenosyl, was created around the Kaiser Oak on the eastern slope.

=== Viewing platform ===
Adjacent to the "Gasthaus Zur Schönen Aussicht," a substantial viewing platform was built in 1925 on a rocky promontory above the Calvari walls. This terrace, known as "Donaublick," provided an uninterrupted view spanning the Danube to the Pöstlingberg.

=== Aviation Memorial ===
At the suggestion of the Oberösterreichischen Vereins für Luftschifffahrt (Upper Austrian Airship Association), an aviation monument featuring a viewing platform was unveiled on November 23, 1913, to commemorate the balloon journeys of Archduke Josef Ferdinand, a dedicated aviation enthusiast. This monument was situated to the east of the Jägermayrhof. An eight-meter-tall marble monolith supported a 1.8-meter-high Icarus figure. During World War II, the monument was destroyed, and the statue was melted down as part of a metal collection effort after the war in 1944.

In 1954, the city of Linz installed a new monument, known as the "Statt Fliegerdenkmal". This monument features a youth with raised arms and was originally crafted in 1929 by Wilhelm Frass before being cast in bronze. Initially placed on the grave of the mayor of St. Pölten, it now stands on a marble column supported by two granite steps. This monument is not located at the site of the former aviators' memorial.

=== Barbara Chapel ===
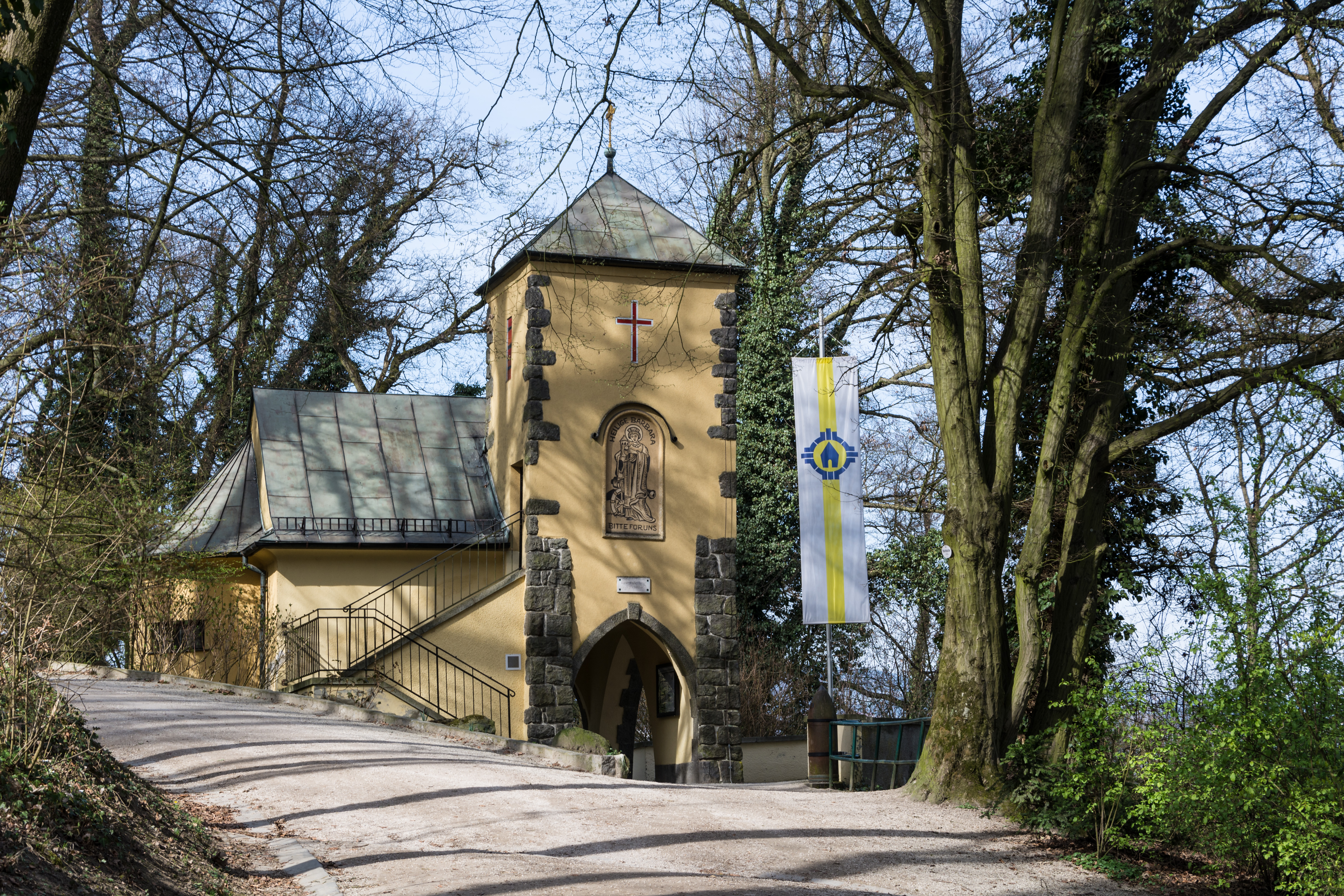
Barbara-Kapelle

In 1932, the "oberösterreichische Artilleristenbund" (Upper Austrian Artillerymen's Association) had the Barbara Chapel built on the Römerstraße on the Freinberg in memory of the fallen comrades of the First World War. The chapel is oriented to the northeast and was designed to offer an unobstructed view of the Danube Valley and Linz at the time. It features a small tower rising above a porch that is open on three sides. On the southern side of the chapel, there is a sgraffito depicting Saint Barbara, along with a building, a host, a cannon, and the inscription: "Saint Barbara pray for us." The Chapel of St. Barbara is part of the parish of St. Matthias.

During the Second World War, the chapel sustained damage from aerial bombs in 1944. Fortunately, repairs were carried out in 1950.

=== Memorial to Elsa Brändström ===
Elsa Brändström (March 26, 1888 – March 4, 1948) was a philanthropist. During World War I, she served as a volunteer nurse with the Russian army. Subsequently, on behalf of the Swedish Red Cross, she traveled to Siberia following the war. There, in prisoner-of-war camps, she established essential medical care, earning her the nickname "Angel of Siberia." Elsa Brändström dedicated her life to various charitable organizations.

In honor of her contributions, a memorial was erected on May 28, 1961, at Römerstraße 96, near the Franz Josef-Warte.

=== Franz Schubert Linde ===
On November 19, 1978, in commemoration of the 150th anniversary of composer Franz Schubert's death (January 31, 1797 – November 19, 1828), the city of Linz planted a linden tree. This tree was planted at the site of the former "Gasthaus Zur schönen Aussicht" (Inn to the beautiful view). Additionally, a commemorative plaque was installed beside the lime tree.

=== Children's Playground ===
In 1949 a children's playground was created on the Rosenhang.

== Objects in the statistical district of Freinberg ==
Other notable features in the Freinberg statistical district include the Sample Tower, the College Aloisianum, the Freinberg Transmitter, and the Johannes Kepler Observatory.
