= Trams in Linz =

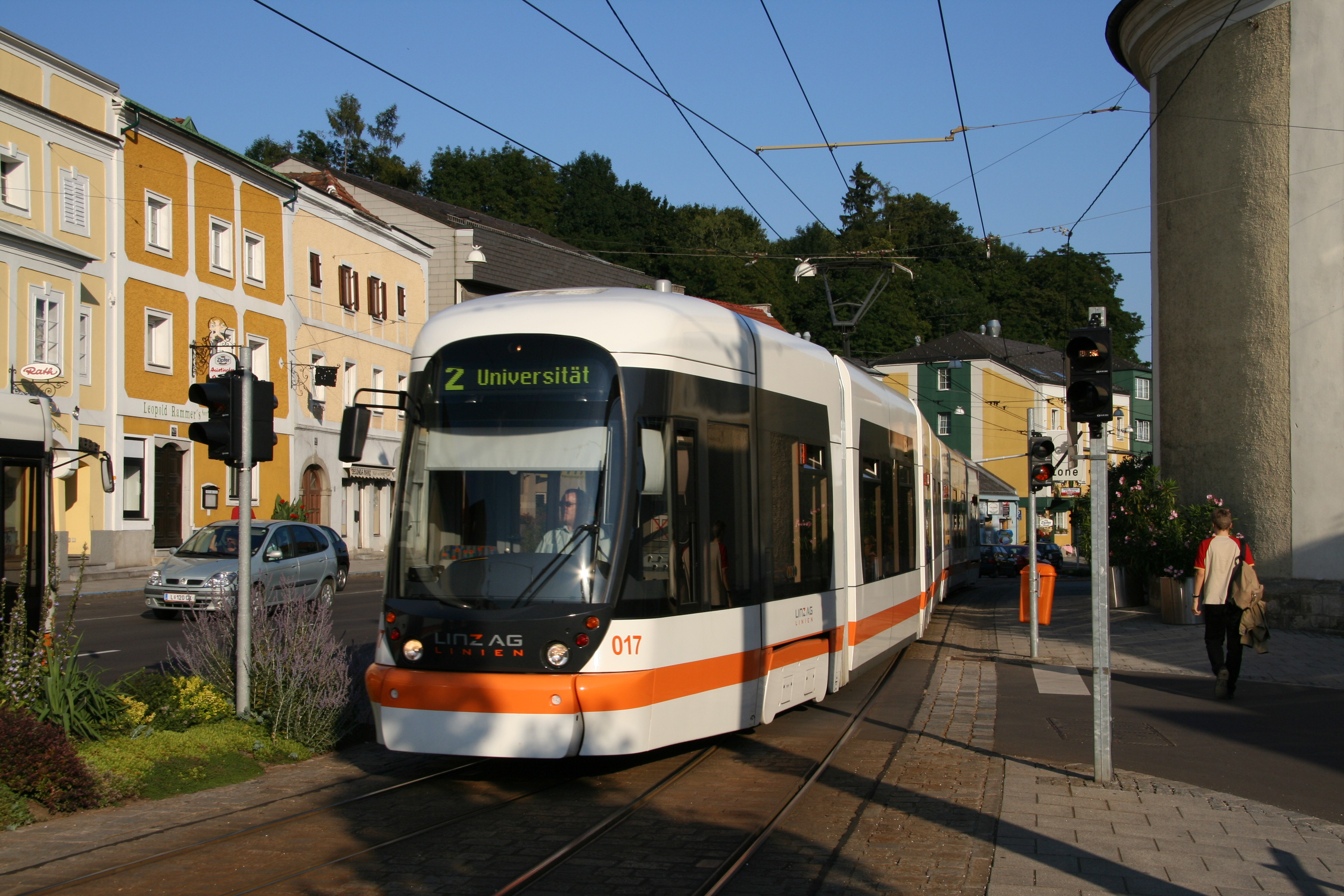

Operation
- Locale: Linz, Upper Austria, Austria
- Open: 18 July 1880 (horsecar); 31 July 1897 (electric)
- Status: Operational
- Lines: 5
- Operator: Linz AG

Infrastructure
- Track gauge: 900 mm (2 ft 11 7/16 in)
- Propulsion system: Electricity

Trams in Linz (German: Linzer Straßenbahn-Netz) is a network of tramways forming the backbone of the urban public transport system in Linz, which is the capital city of the federal state of Upper Austria in Austria.

The network is operated by the Linz Linien division of Linz AG, the city-owned utility company, and uses the unusual track gauge of 900 mm (2 ft 11 7/16 in). It consists of four lines, including the Pöstlingbergbahn mountain tramway with which it has been integrated since 2009. Linz Linien also operates the Linz citybus network and the Linz trolleybus network.

== History ==
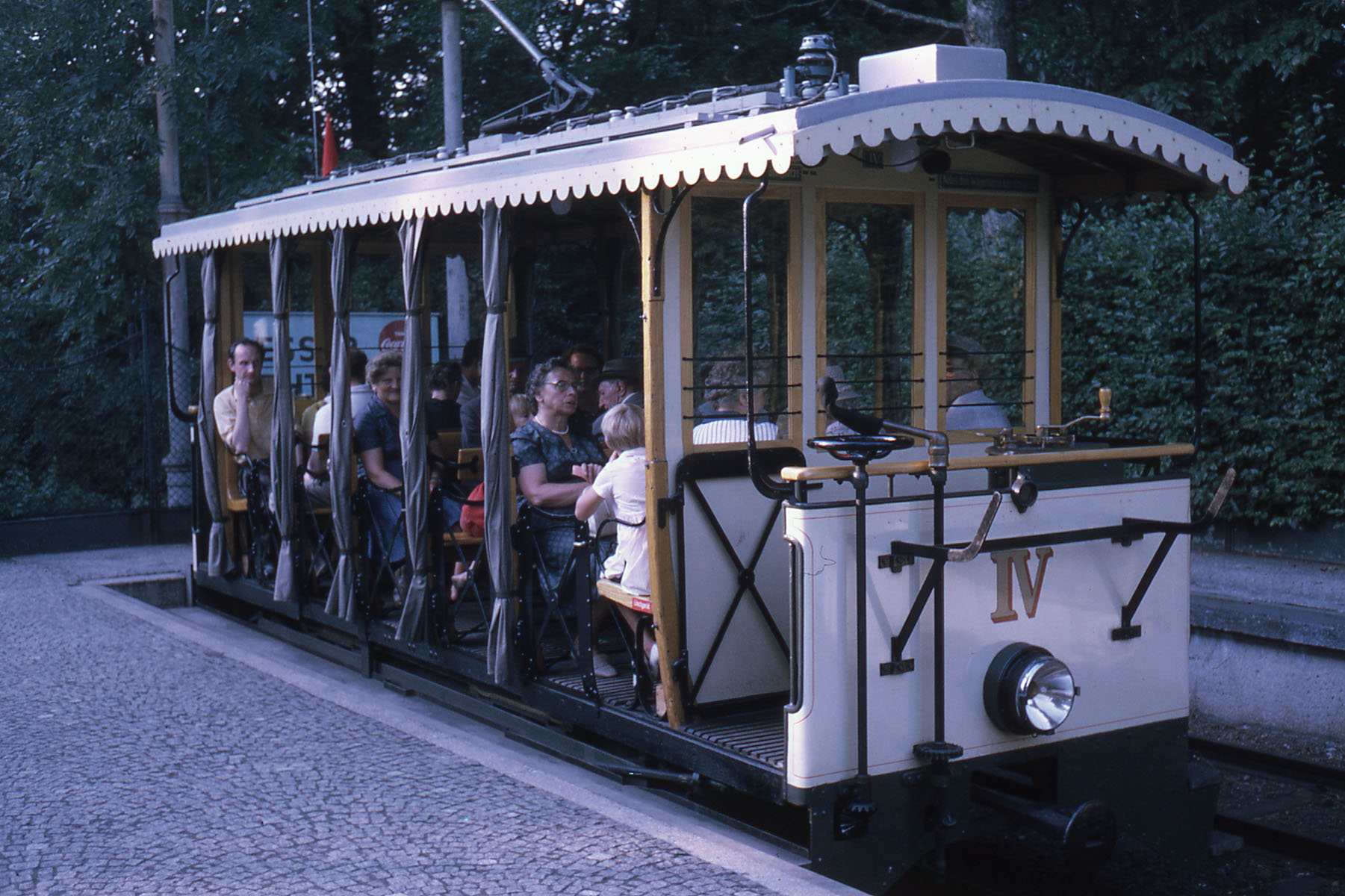
Early Pöstlingberg tram still in service in 1970

The first trams operated in the city of Linz in 1880, when a 2.6-kilometre-long (1.6 mi) horse-drawn tramway was opened from the main station, then known as the Westbahnhof, through the city centre and across the Danube to a terminus at the present Hinsenkampplatz. The line was built to the unusual tramway gauge of 900 mm (2 ft 11 7/16 in), which, outside the Linz area, is only used by the trams in Lisbon. In 1895, the line was extended by 300 metres (980 ft) at its northern end to the Linz Urfahr railway station, popularly known as the Mühlkreisbahnhof. In 1897, the tramway was electrified.

In 1898, the then-independent Pöstlingbergbahn opened from Linz Urfahr railway station to the summit of the Pöstlingberg. This line was built to 1,000 mm (3 ft 3 3/8 in) metre gauge and there was therefore no possibility of trams running through from Linz city centre to the Pöstlingberg. Instead passengers changed trams at Linz Urfahr.

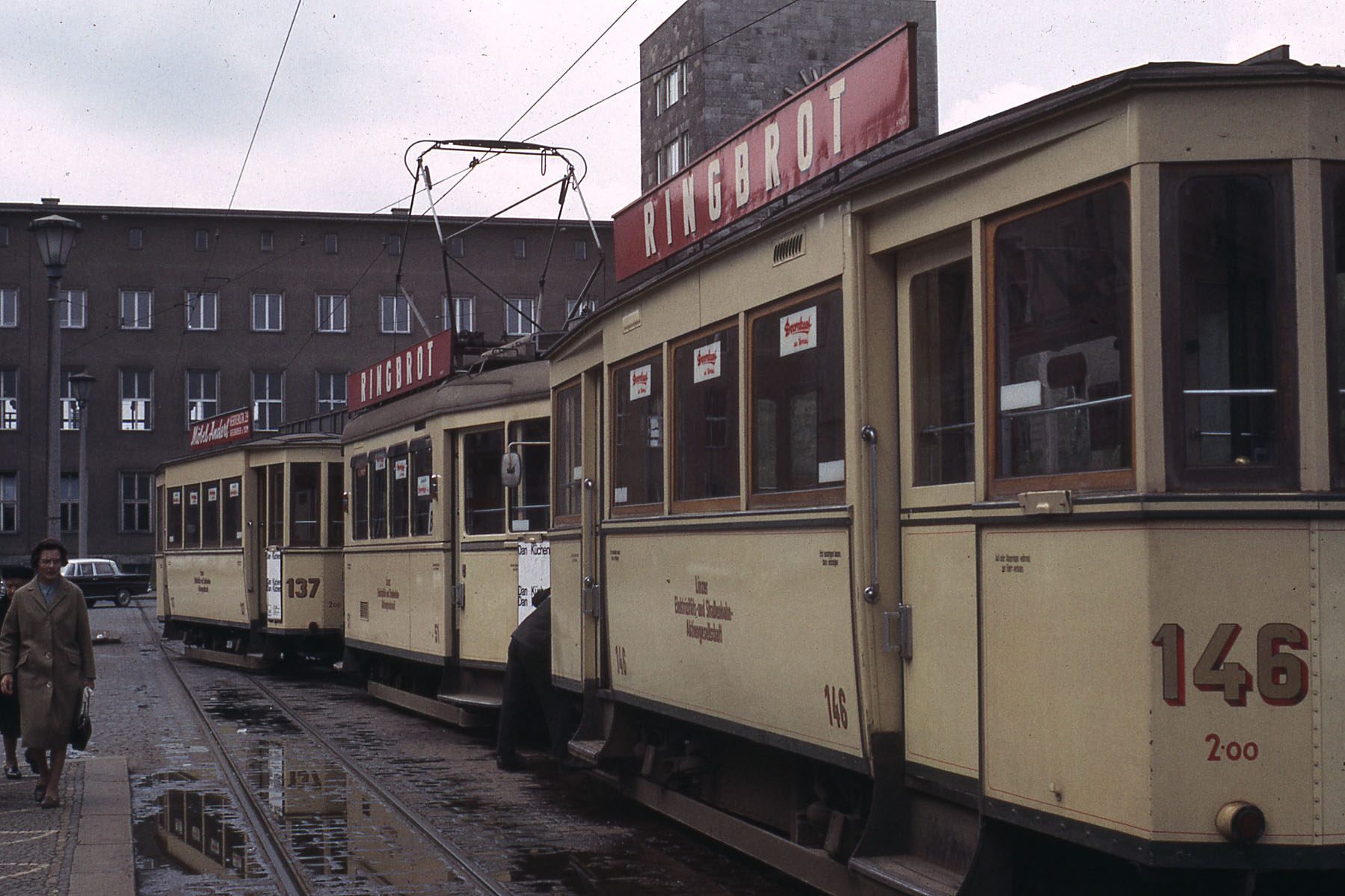
Trams at the former Hauptbahnhof street terminus in 1965

In 1902 the main tram network was expanded by a line linking Blumauerplatz, on the existing line south of the city centre, with the northern side of the bridge over the Traun river in Kleinmünchen, giving a total length of 5.88 kilometres (3.65 mi). With this extension, the Linz tramway took on the form it was to retain for many years, with a long north to south line and a short branch to the main railway station. In 1914, the transverse route M opened, whilst the north-south line was covered by routes B from Urfahr to the station and E from Urfahr to the southern terminus.

In 1929, the north-south axis was lengthened to the south, with a new bridge to the suburb of Ebelsberg. Here a connection was made with the independent Florianerbahn to Sankt Florian. The tram lines were damaged during the Second World War, and the situation post-war was not helped by the Danube bridge forming a control point between the US and Russian occupied sectors of Austria, forcing passengers to change trams there.

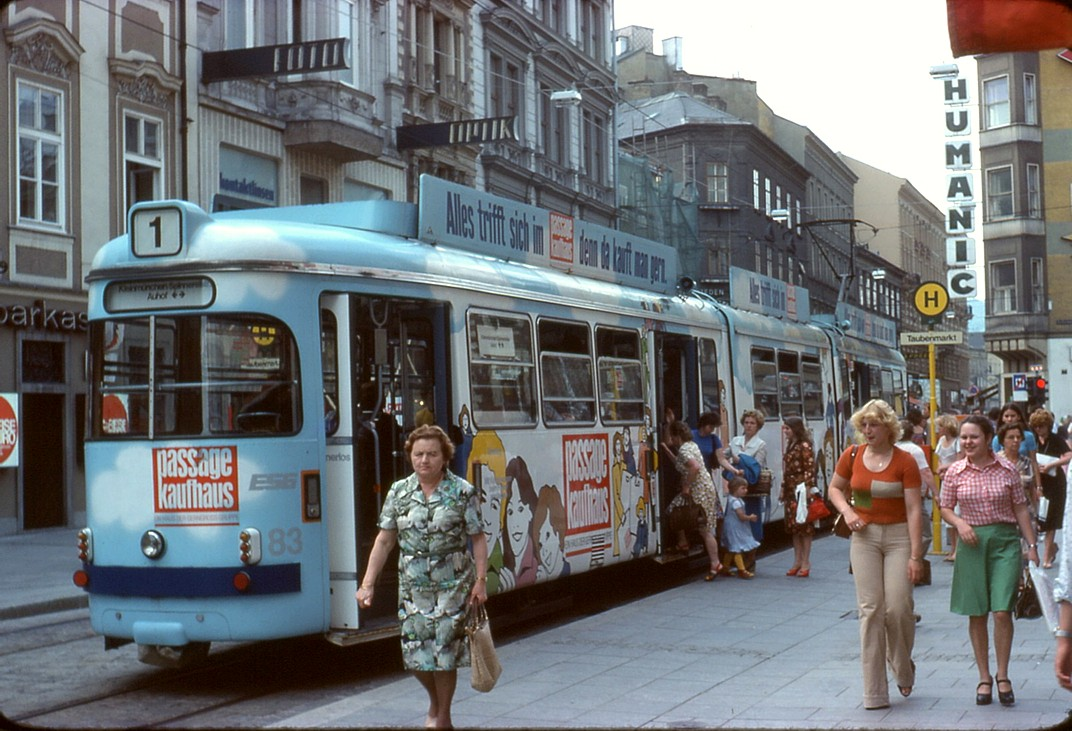
Trams in central Linz in 1978

After 1955, some reconstruction took place, but in 1969, the transverse route M was replaced by buses. In 1985 a branch was opened from Kleinmünchen to Auwiesen. Between 2002 and 2005 the route to Ebelsberg was extended in sections to solarCity. In 2004, the main north-south route was diverted in a tunnel via the main railway station, thus removing the need for a separate branch to that location. In 2011, a new branch diverging from this tunnel at the railway station was extended to Doblerholz.

Meanwhile, in 2008, the previously separate Pöstlingbergbahn was closed and rebuilt to the same gauge as the Linz trams. A connection between the two systems was created at Urfahr, enabling trams to run through. The line reopened in 2009.

== Operation ==
=== Lines ===
Map of the network, 2023.

Line 1 and Line 2 JKU/Universität - Auwiesen / solarCity

Overview
- Native name: Linie 1 und Linie 2
- Termini: 1 2 JKU/Universität; 1 Auwiesen 2 solarCity
- Stations: 1 35 2 44
- Color on map: 1 Deep Pink 2 Orchid

History
- Current route since: 2005

Technical
- Line length: 1 14.15 km (8.79 mi); 2 18.56 km (11.53 mi)

Line 3, 4 and 50

Overview
- Native name: Linie 3, 4 und 50
- Termini: 3 4 Landgutstraße 50 Hauptplatz; 3 Trauner Kreuzung 4 Schloss Traun 50 Pöstlingberg
- Stations: 3 23 4 26 50 14
- Color on map: 3 red 4 darkmagenta 50 seashell

History
- Current route since: 2016

Technical
- Line length: 3 11.0 km (6.8 mi); 4 12.8 km (8.0 mi); 50 4.1 km (2.5 mi)

The following services operate:

Number	Route	Length	Stops
1	Universität – Rudolfstraße – Hauptplatz – Hauptbahnhof – Simonystraße – Auwiesen	14.5 km (9.0 mi)	35
2	Universität – Rudolfstraße – Hauptplatz – Hauptbahnhof – Simonystraße – Ebelsberg – solarCity	18.5 km (11.5 mi)	44
3	Landgutstraße – Rudolfstraße – Hauptplatz – Hauptbahnhof – Meixnerkreuzung – PlusCity – Trauner Kreuzung	10.9 km (6.8 mi)	23
4	Landgutstraße – Rudolfstraße – Hauptplatz – Hauptbahnhof – Meixnerkreuzung – PlusCity – Trauner Kreuzung – Schloss Traun	12.7 km (7.9 mi)	26
50	Pöstlingberg – Landgutstraße – Rudolfstraße – Hauptplatz	4.1 km (2.5 mi)	14

Route 50 operates over the Pöstlingbergbahn between Pöstlingberg and Landgutstraße. In the nights at weekends two night lines (N82 and N84) operate every half hour from midnight to 05:30 AM. They have the same route as the lines 2 and 4 during the day.

=== Infrastructure ===
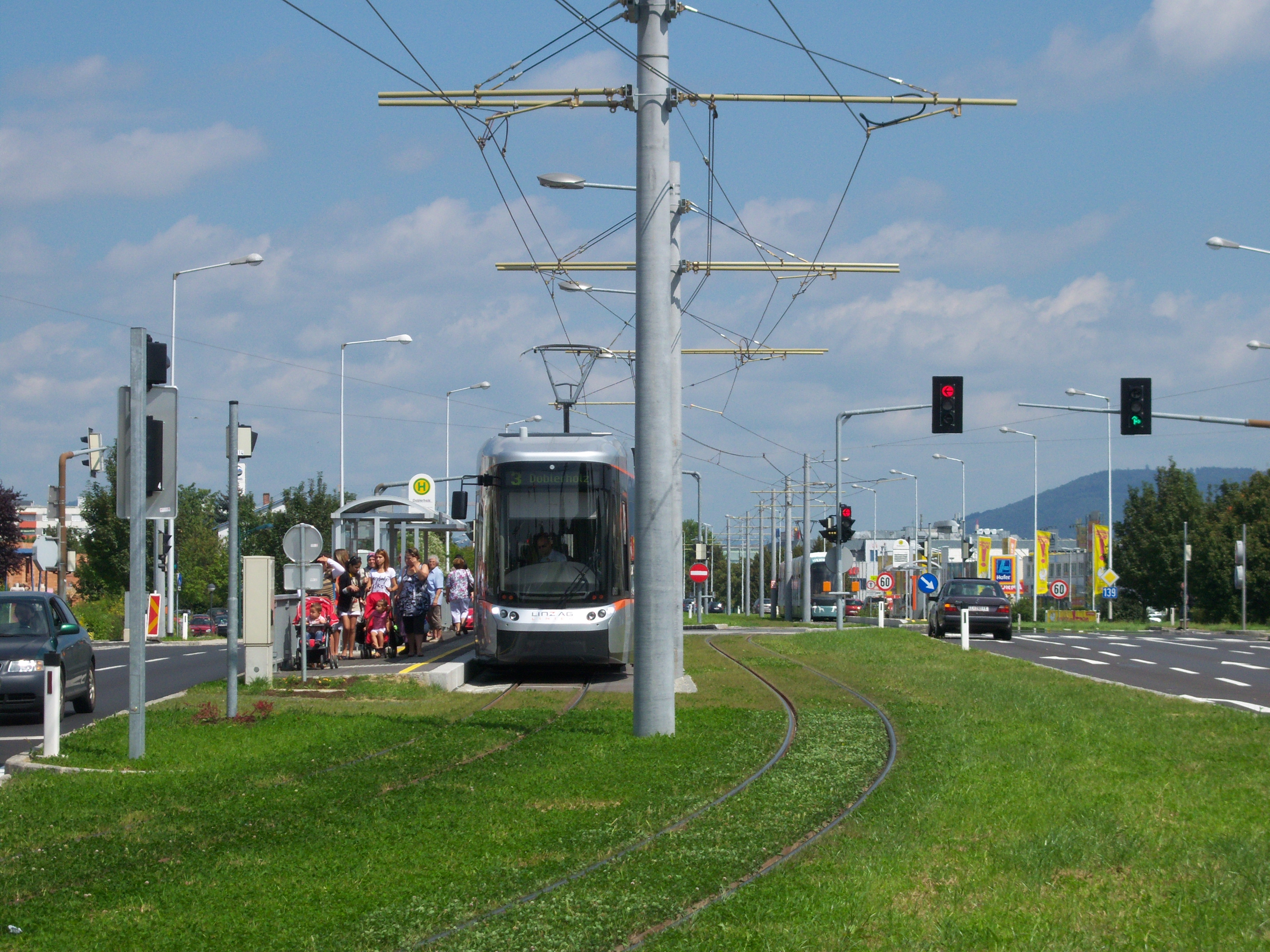
An example of grassed right of way

Linz's tram network is built to 900 mm (2 ft 11 7/16 in) and is electrified using overhead line. The network is largely double track, with single-track on the Pöstlingbergbahn, and a stretch of interlaced track at a bottleneck in the road through Ebelsberg. Most of the track is at grade, with the exception of a tunnelled section, serving three stops, at Hauptbahnhof. A large part of the network is segregated, often on grassed right of way.

As the trams used on routes 1–4 are single-ended, with doors on only one side, all terminal locations are equipped with turning loops, and all tram stops are to the nearside of the tram. By contrast, the trams used on route 50 are double-ended, with doors on both sides, and use stub terminals at Pöstlingberg and Hauptplatz. With a maximum grade of 11.6%, the Pöstlingbergbahn section of line 50 is one of the steepest adhesion tram lines in the world and the steepest adhesion railway in Austria.

A special feature of the network are the level crossings where the trams cross the standard gauge non-electrified Mühlkreisbahn railway and its connecting line to the main Austrian Federal Railways network. Lines 1 and 2 cross the connecting line to the east of Linz Urfahr railway station, whilst line 50 crosses the Mühlkreisbahn proper to the west of that station. The connecting line itself has some of the attributes of a tramway, running in the carriageway of a road during its crossing of the Danube on the so-called Eisenbahnbrücke.

=== Tram fleet ===
The Linz tramway network's fleet is:

Nos.	Image	Manufacturer	Built	Length	Axles	Seated/Standing	Notes
001–033		Bombardier	2002-2005, 2008-2009	40 m (131 ft 3 in)	8	74/151	Single-ended tram to Bombardier's standard, 100% low-floor, Cityrunner design, used on routes 1–4.
060-088		Bombardier	2011-2012, 2015	40.80 m (133 ft 10 in)	8	71/156	Single-ended tram to Bombardier's standard, 100% low-floor, Flexity Outlook 2 design, used on routes 1–4.
501-504		Bombardier	2008-2009, 2011	19.16 m (62 ft 10 in)	4	33/53	Double-ended tram based on Bombardier's standard, 100% low-floor, Flexity Outlook design with modifications for use on steep gradients, used on route 50.

== Future ==
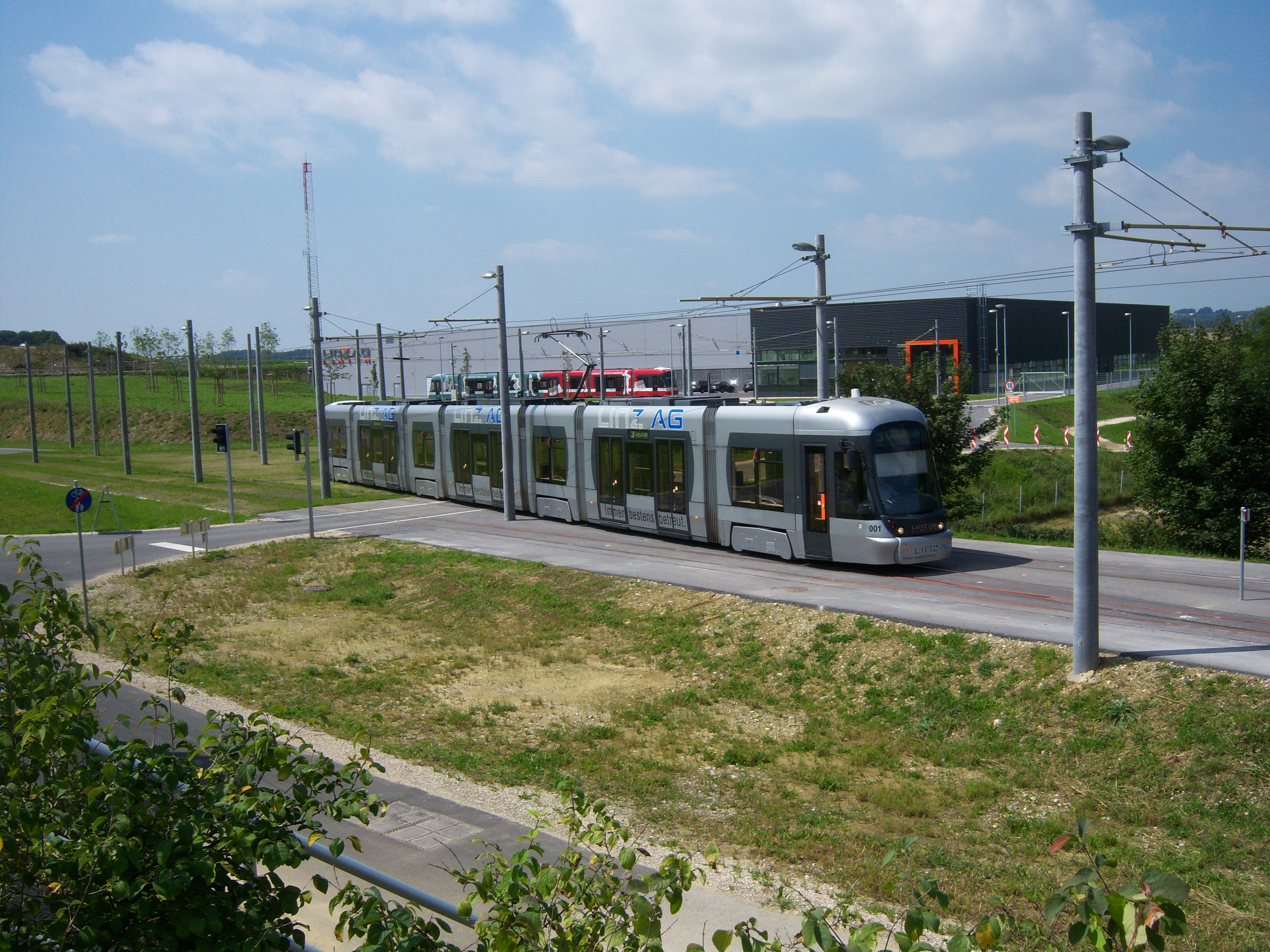
The previous terminus Doblerholz of line 3, with depot in background, and stub for extension to Traun to the left of the tram.

The previous terminus (until 2016) of line 3 at Doblerholz was intended to be temporary, with a further extension of some 5 kilometres (3.1 mi) intended. The plan was to build this in two incremental phases, with the first stage terminating at the Trauner Kreuzung by February 2016, and the second phase extending to Traun. In September 2016 the last part (Trauner Kreuzung - Schloss Traun) was finished.

There are also plans for the construction of a second tram axis in Linz, connecting with the existing north-south line both north of the Danube and south of the railway station, but running to the east of the existing route. This axis would be in tunnel for much of its length, but would cross the Danube using the existing Eisenbahnbrücke.

Further plans, making use of the additional capacity made available by this second axis, involve the use of tram-trains over local railway lines to form a RegioTram network.

== See also ==
- List of town tramway systems in Austria
- Transport in Austria
