= Pasching =

- Municipality
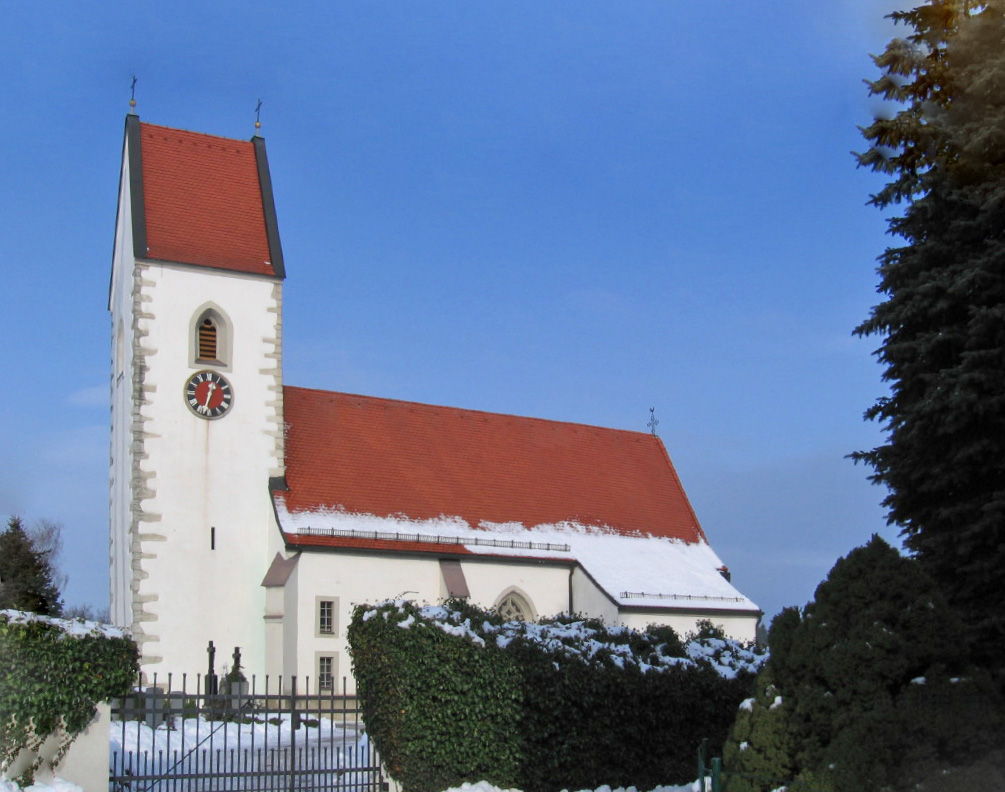
- Church of Saint John the Baptist

- Coat of arms

- Location within Austria
- Coordinates: 48°15′32″N 14°12′10″E
- Country: Austria
- State: Upper Austria
- District: Linz-Land

Government
  - Mayor: Markus Hofko (ÖVP)

Area
  - Total: 12.48 km^{2} (4.82 sq mi)
- Elevation: 295 m (968 ft)

Population (2018-01-01)
  - Total: 7,552
  - Density: 605.1/km^{2} (1,567/sq mi)
- Time zone: UTC+1 (CET)
  - Summer (DST): UTC+2 (CEST)
- Postal code: 4061
- Area code: 07221, 07229
- Vehicle registration: LL
- Website: www.pasching.at

Pasching is a municipality in the Austrian state of Upper Austria. It is situated a few miles southwest of Linz and borders Leonding, Hörsching, Wilhering and Traun.

Situated along the famous shopping mile the Kremstal Straße, it is the home of many retailers. One of the biggest shopping centers in Austria, the Plus City is located in Pasching. Due to the vicinity of Linz many smaller industries have settled down here too.

A major problem in Pasching is the heavy traffic along the Kremstal Straße especially around the shopping center. A by-pass has partially already been built from Traun to the Plus City. The rest of it is readily planned but a conflict on the financing of the construction between the affected municipalities of Pasching and Leonding and the Republic of Austria as the owner of the street delays the start of construction.

Pasching got major attention for its football (soccer) club FC Superfund that played in the Austrian major league, the Bundesliga 2002-2007.

== Population ==
Historical population
Year	Pop.	±%
1869	942	—
1880	1,023	+8.6%
1890	1,118	+9.3%
1900	1,082	−3.2%
1910	1,110	+2.6%
1923	1,203	+8.4%
1934	1,408	+17.0%
1939	1,372	−2.6%
1951	1,700	+23.9%
1961	4,748	+179.3%
1971	6,081	+28.1%
1981	6,325	+4.0%
1991	6,062	−4.2%
2001	6,123	+1.0%
2012	7,114	+16.2%

== Politics ==
The "Paschinger Gemeinderat" (the city council of Pasching) includes 31 "Gemeinderäte" (Senators). Since the last elections in 2009:

- Socialdemocratic Party of Austria - SPÖ: 14 seats
- Austrian People's Party - ÖVP: 7 seats
- The List of Fritz Böhm: 4 seats
- Freedom Party of Austria - FPÖ: 3 seats
- The Greens - The Green Alternative: 1 seat
- People's List for Human, Environment and Development: 1 seat
- The List of Franz Kainz - KAINZ: 1 seat

The elected mayor of Pasching is Peter Mair, who received over 51% of votes in the first election round so that he was elected immediately. There was no second voting round.
