= Pöstlingbergbahn =

Narrow-gauge railway in Linz, Austria

Coordinates: 48°18′40″N 14°16′35″E

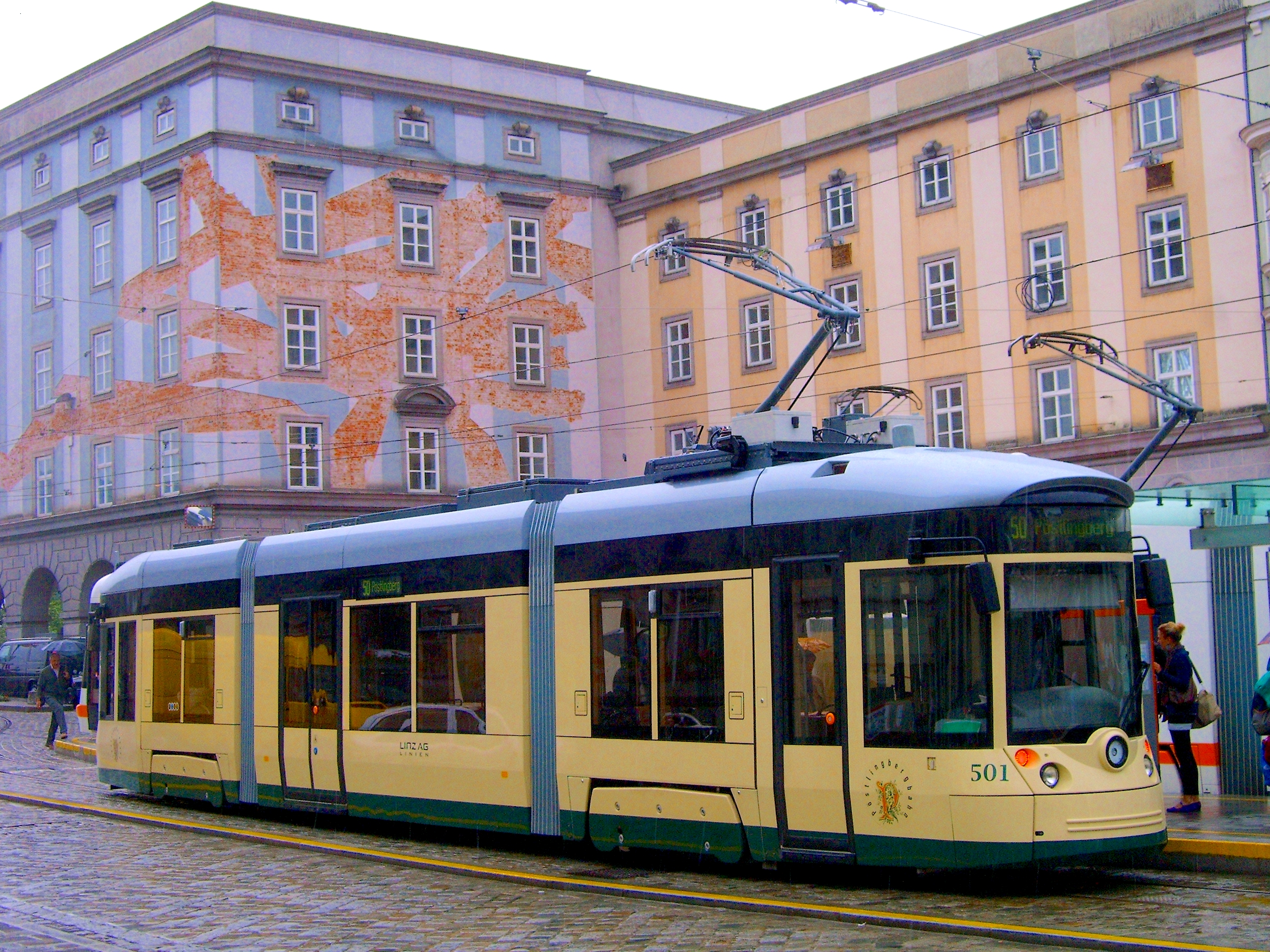
- One of the Pöstlingbergbahn's new low-floor tramcars, at Hauptplatz in the city center

Overview
- Owner: Linz AG
- Locale: Linz, Austria

Service
- Operator(s): Linz AG

Technical
- Line length: 4.1 km (2.5 mi)
- Track gauge: 900 mm (2 ft 11 7/16 in)

The Pöstlingbergbahn (German pronunciation: [ˈpœstlɪŋˌbɛʁkbaːn]) is a narrow-gauge electric railway, or "mountain tramway", in Linz, Austria. It connects the main square in the centre of Linz with the district of Pöstlingberg, located at the top of a hill (or small mountain) at the northern end of the city. Opened in 1898, for 110 years the metre-gauge railway ran from a terminal station in Linz's Urfahr neighbourhood, located across from the terminus of urban tram route 3, to Pöstlingberg. In 2009, service was extended from Urfahr to the city centre. To permit this change, the railway was regauged from 1,000 mm (3 ft 3 3/8 in) metre gauge to 900 mm (2 ft 11 7/16 in) and a track connection to the Linz tram network was built. Service was suspended from March 2008 until May 2009 for this work. With a maximum grade of 11.6%, the Pöstlingbergbahn has the steepest grade of any in Austria, and is one of the steepest adhesion railways in the world. (There are steeper grades on at least one other tram system, that of Lisbon, Portugal.)

== History ==
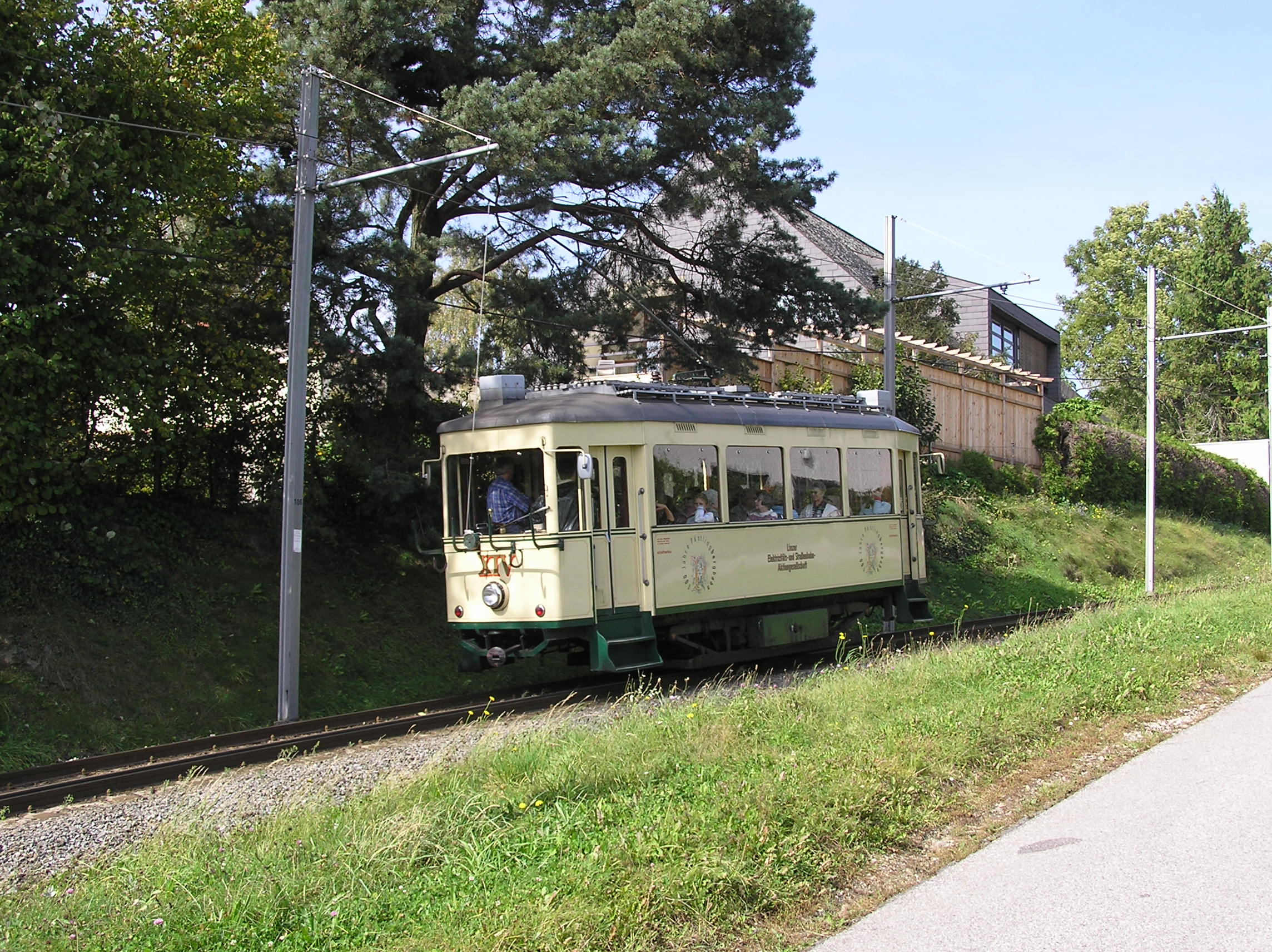
1954-built car XIV climbing the hill, near Schableder stop

From the mid-18th century, the community of Pöstlingberg was a destination for pilgrims. A chapel was built there around 1720, and a church opened in 1748. From the end of the 18th Century, the mountain was increasingly frequented by hikers, especially after the summit area had been cleared for military reasons in 1809 and in the 1830s and revealed an impressive view. The construction of a railway was deemed worthwhile.

To increase the attractiveness of Pöstlingberg as a destination and to distribute electric current to households in the area, it was planned to construct transformers for the distribution of power to both the railway and homes. This was aided in 1883, when the fort in the area was demilitarised. In 1897, the construction company Ritschl & Co. purchased the fort, and three months later, transferred the property rights over the land to the newly-established Tramway- und Elektrizitäts-Gesellschaft Linz-Urfahr (Tramway and Electric Company Linz-Urfahr) (TEG), the forerunner of today's Linz AG. Tower IV of the fortress incorporates the Pöstlingbergbahn station. At the fortress wall between the tower and tower VI, a hotel/restaurant (now "Pöstlingberg Schlössl") was established. In 1906, the Linz Grotto Railway was opened in Tower II.

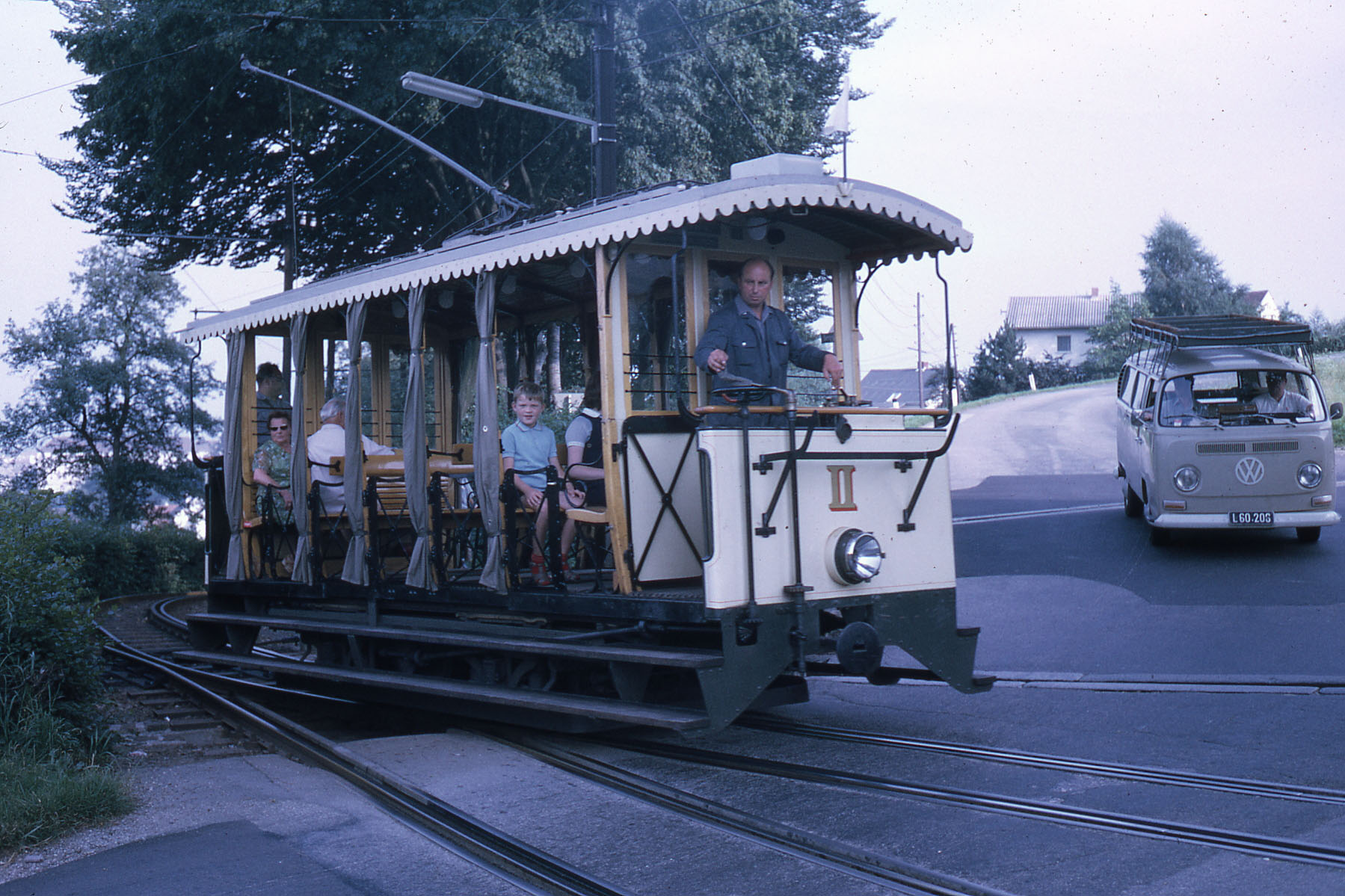
Open car II in service in 1970

The Pöstlingbergbahn was initially intended to be run as an excursion-type service, in summer months only, and for this reason the only rolling stock procured were six open-sided cars (locally referred to as "summer cars"). Passenger numbers exceeded expectations in the first year of operation, and consequently two enclosed cars were purchased in early 1899.

== Ridership ==
Ridership slowly increased to just over 200,000 passengers per year by the First World War. During the war and immediate postwar years, passenger numbers rose because of an increase in city dwellers taking trips into the countryside in search of scarce provisions. In the 1920s, commuter numbers increased further still, to 400,000 per year, and then declined in the 1930s to 300,000 per year. During and after Second World War, passenger numbers reached record levels (1943: 1,264,000 passengers). Until the mid-1950s, the numbers fluctuated to between about 1 and 1.1 million passengers, decreasing since then. Today, about 500,000 people per year use the line.

In 1988, the service was converted to a one-man operation; i.e., the use of conductors to collect fares was discontinued. The tramcars (except for the summer cars) were consequently fitted with a Dead man's handle. Furthermore, the points (or switches), which previously had to be set by the conductor, were converted to electric operation, with key switches, which enabled the motormen easily to operate them. Ticket vending machines were also installed.

On 24 January 2005, a derailment sparked a debate over the safety of operations. Mayor Dobusch proposed rebuilding the railway and extending service to Linz's main square. In July 2006, it was decided to modernize the Pöstlingbergbahn.

== Modernization and extension ==
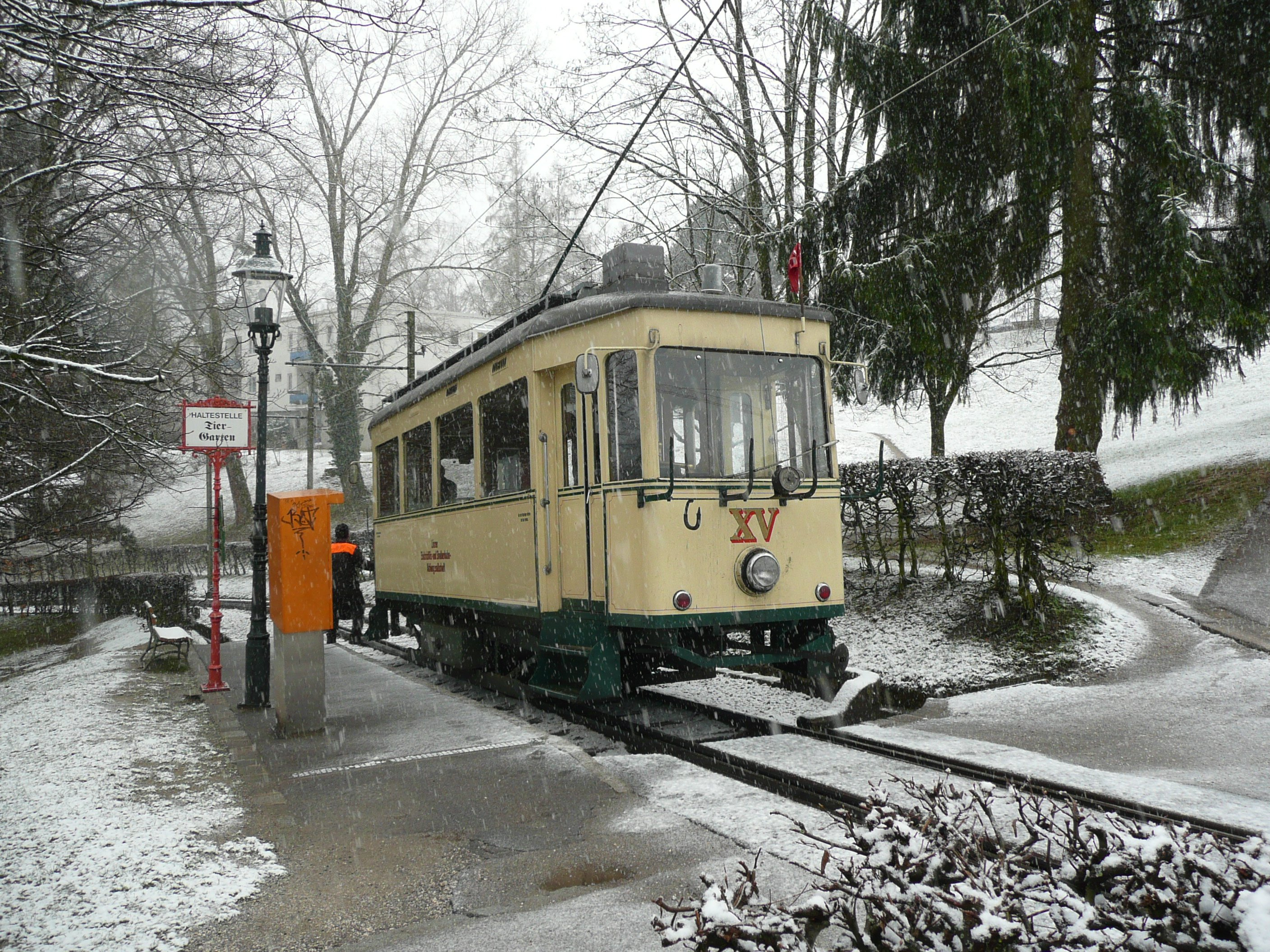
Car XV leaving Tiergarten stop (stop for the zoo of Linz) in a light snowfall on 21 March 2008, four days before the end of meter-gauge operation and trolley pole current collection

Starting on 25 March 2008 service was temporarily halted for reconstruction and fleet replacement. During the 14-month suspension of rail service, buses provided a substitute service. On the existing section of the line, the most notable change was the re-gauging from meter gauge to 900 mm. The track was completely rebuilt, the unusual "Y" head rails being replaced with conventional flat-bottomed rails on concrete ties/sleepers.

Three new low-floor tramcars were purchased from Bombardier, numbered 501–503. The purchase price was €4.6 million each. In addition, three old trams (VIII, X and XI) from the then-current fleet were chosen to be retained and modernized through rebuilding of their chassis, and the fitting of dual traction control systems. The emergency braking system was converted to magnetic track brakes instead of the caliper brakes previously used. Trolley pole current collection was replaced by pantograph collection with the change; the overhead wires were modified accordingly. The first of three new Bombardier vehicles arrived on 2 April 2009; the other two cars followed in early May. The delivery of the three rebuilt old cars took place at a later date. In 2011 a fourth Bombardier tramcar was delivered, numbered 504 and identical to the other three. The total cost for the conversion amounted to €35 million, €20 million for the vehicles and €15 million for the rebuilding of the line including the extended operation to the main square.

The changes have caused the Pöstlingbergbahn to be more closely integrated into the urban transport system. From the Hauptplatz (literally, the "main square") in the city centre, passengers, including tourists travelling by rail from the boat docks, can now travel through to Pöstlingberg. The official opening of the rebuilt and extended Pöstlingbergbahn was held on 29 May 2009, in time to celebrate the line's 111th anniversary.

== Museum ==
A museum has been created at the old lower station of the line at Urfahr. This relates the history and the current state of the Pöstlingbergbahn. Information about various topics such as history, technology, and the vehicles is presented, along with smaller exhibits such as examples of rails, pantographs and the clasp brakes. Outside the station building, the original meter gauge tracks have been retained and used to display open and closed carriages from the original rolling stock.

== See also ==
- Trams in Europe
