= Freinberg =

- Municipality
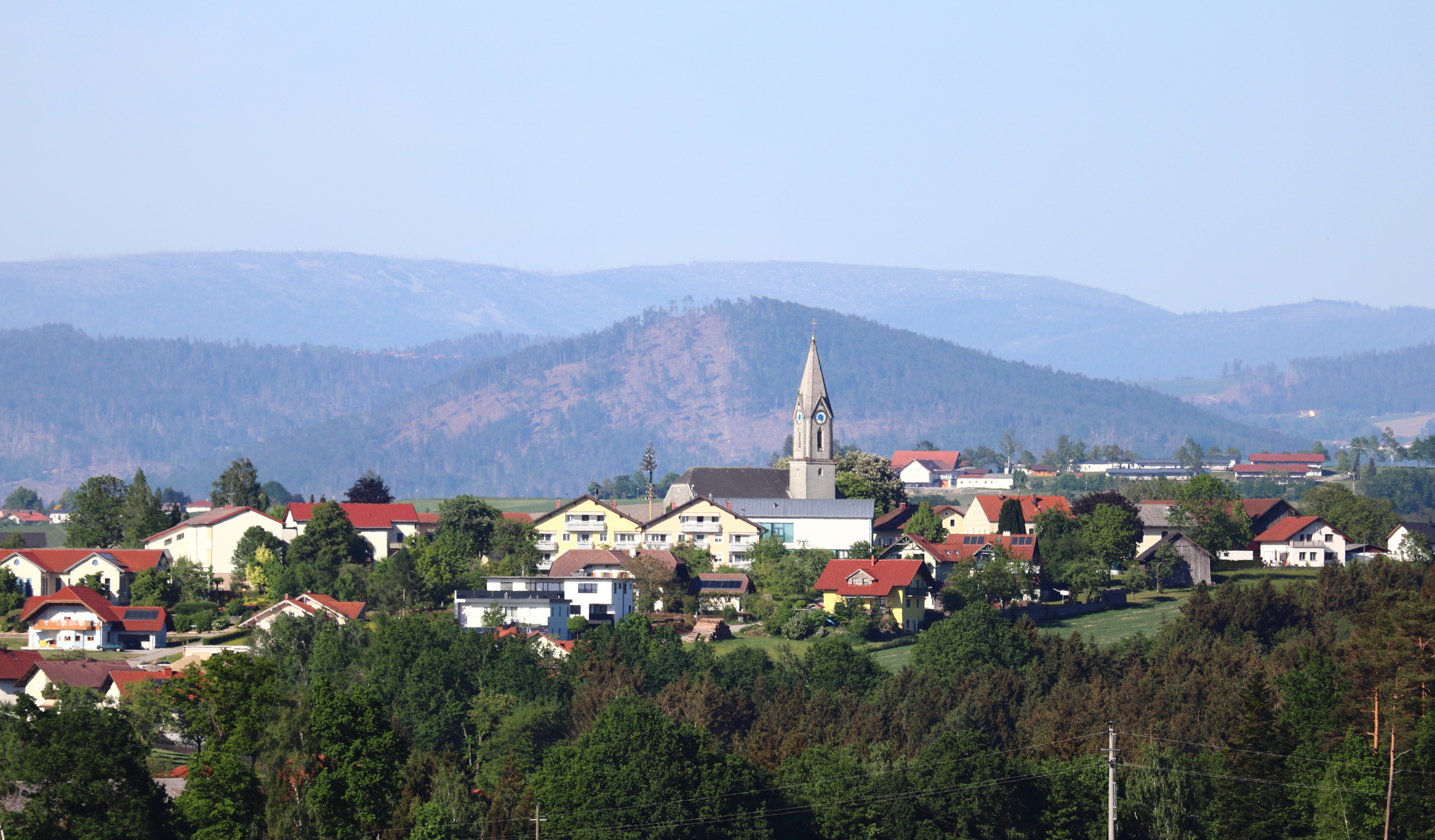
- Freinberg

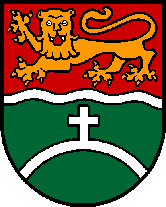
- Coat of arms

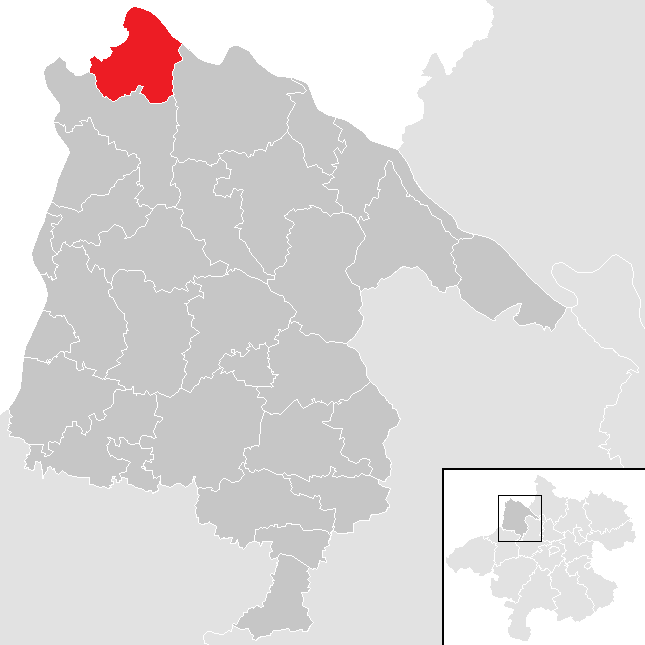
- Location within Schärding district

- Location within Austria
- Coordinates: 48°34′00″N 13°31′00″E
- Country: Austria
- State: Upper Austria
- District: Schärding

Government
  - Mayor: Anton Pretzl (ÖVP)

Area
  - Total: 20.16 km^{2} (7.78 sq mi)
- Elevation: 455 m (1,493 ft)

Population (2018-01-01)
  - Total: 1,458
  - Density: 72.32/km^{2} (187.3/sq mi)
- Time zone: UTC+1 (CET)
  - Summer (DST): UTC+2 (CEST)
- Postal code: 4785
- Area code: 07713
- Vehicle registration: SD
- Website: www.freinberg.at

Freinberg is a municipality in the district of Schärding in Upper Austria, Austria. The municipality has an area of 20 square kilometers and population of 1494 (on 31 December 2005).

== See also ==
- Freinberg (Linz)
