= Pöstlingberg =

Hill in Linz, Austria

Coordinates: 48°19′26″N 14°15′30″E

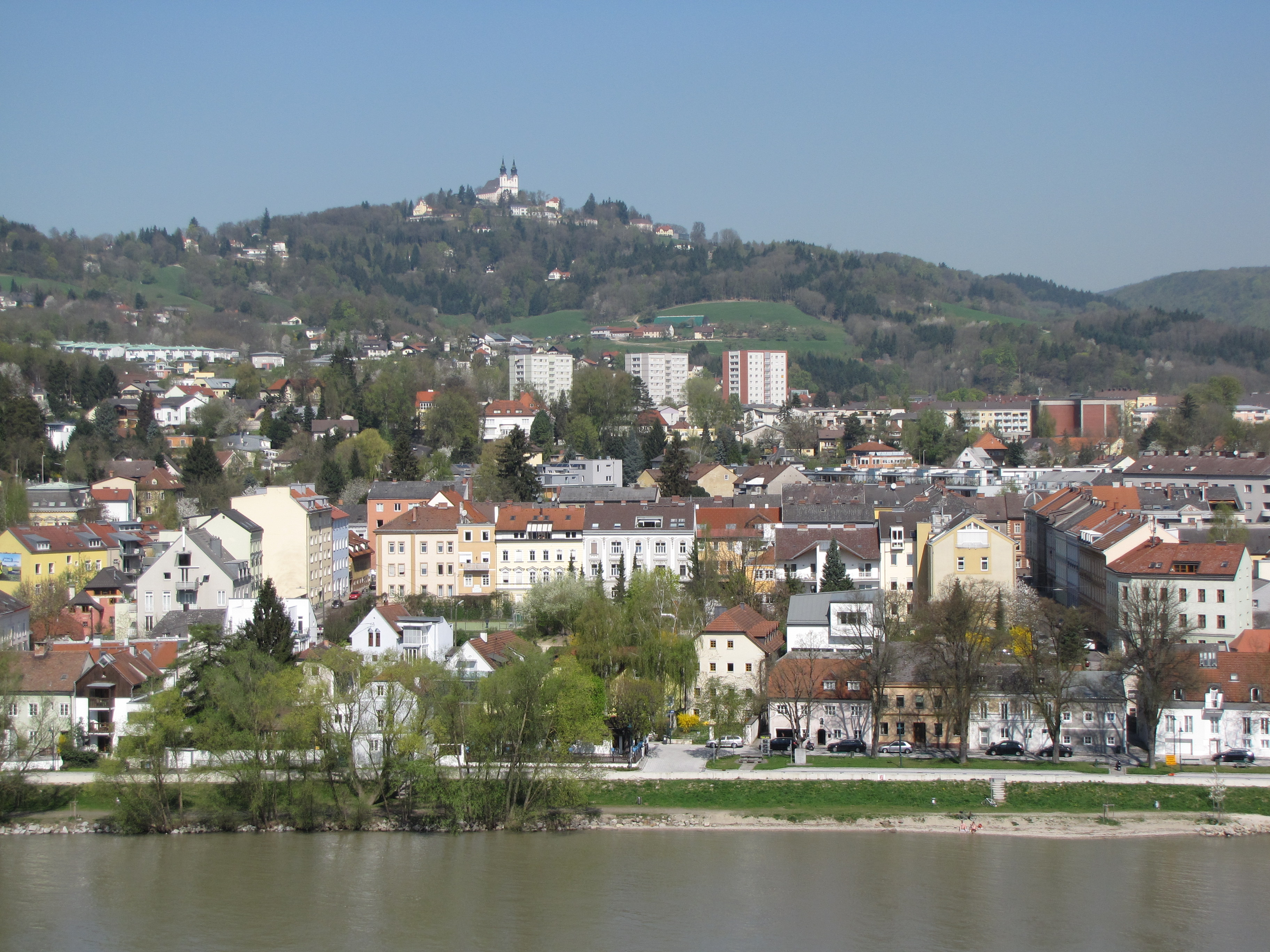
The Pöstlingberg seen from across the Danube

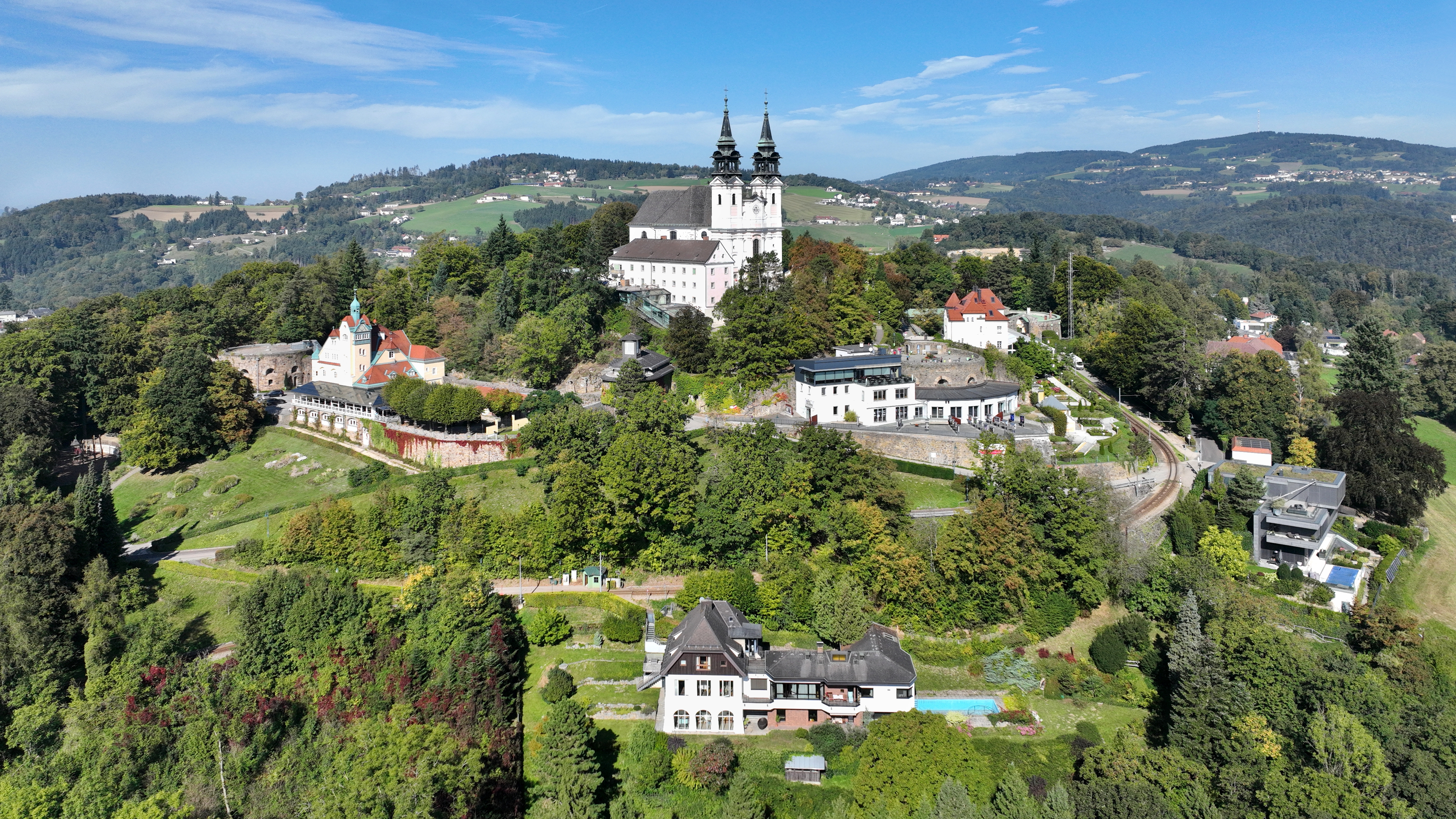
A closer view

The Pöstlingberg (German pronunciation: [ˈpœstlɪŋˌbɛʁk]) is a 539-metre (1,768 ft) high hill on the left bank of the Danube in the city of Linz, Austria. It is a popular tourist destination, with a viewing platform over the city, and is the site of the Pöstlingberg pilgrimage church, and the Linz Grottenbahn.

The Pöstlingberg is reached from the city centre by line 50 of the Linz tramway, running over the Pöstlingbergbahn mountain tramway.

== Bibliography ==
- Erich Hillbrand, Friederike Grill-Hillbrand: Pöstlingberg. Streiflichter auf Erscheinungsbild und Geschichte des Linzer Hausbergs. Universitätsverlag Rudolf Trauner, Linz 1996, ISBN 3-85320-766-9
- Christian Hager: Auf den Pöstlingberg! Geschichte und Geschichten vom Wahrzeichen der Landeshauptstadt Linz. Verlag Denkmayr, Linz 1997, ISBN 3-901123-90-3
