= Trolleybuses in Linz =

Trolley buses in Linz Austria

Linz trolleybus system

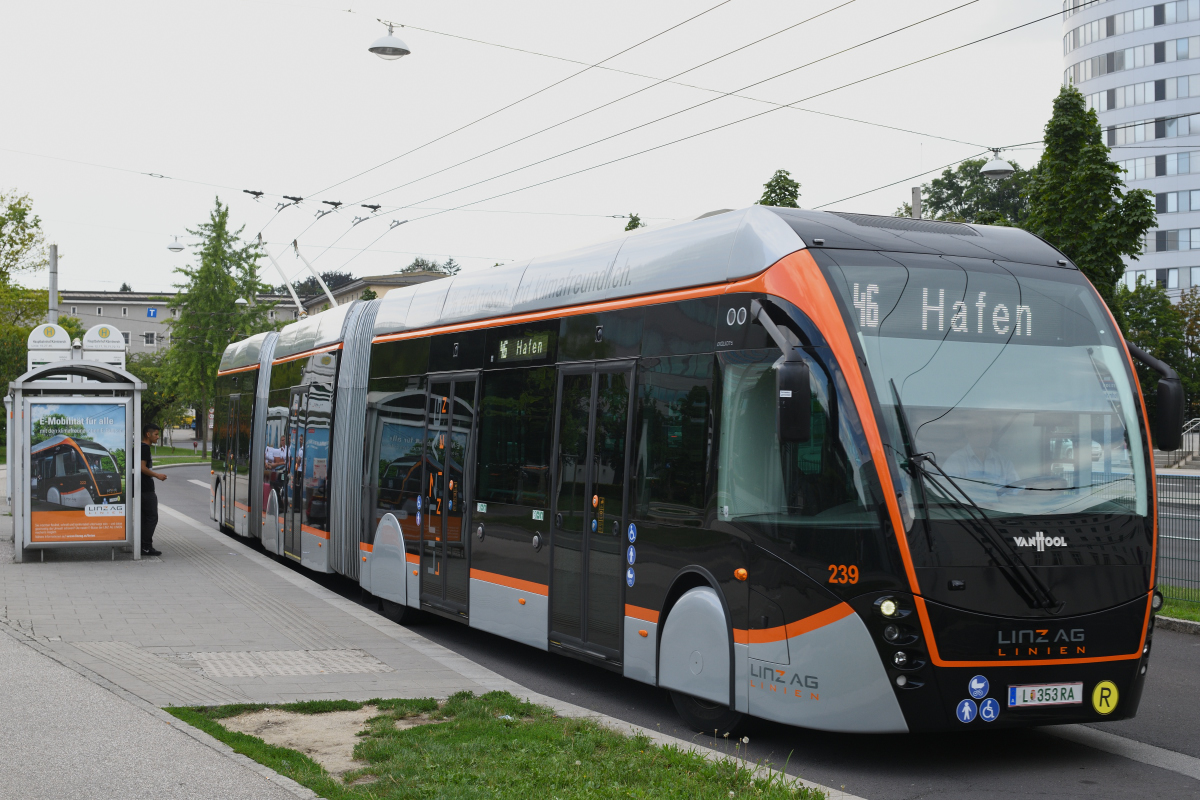
- A Van Hool trolleybus on route 46, 2019

Operation
- Locale: Linz, Austria
- Open: 15 May 1944
- Status: Open
- Routes: 5 (41, 43, 45, 45a, 46)
- Owner: Linz AG
- Operator: Linz AG

Infrastructure
- Electrification: 600 V DC
- Depot: 1
- Stock: 20 articulated trolleybuses

Statistics
- Route length: 28.32 km (17.60 mi)
Overview
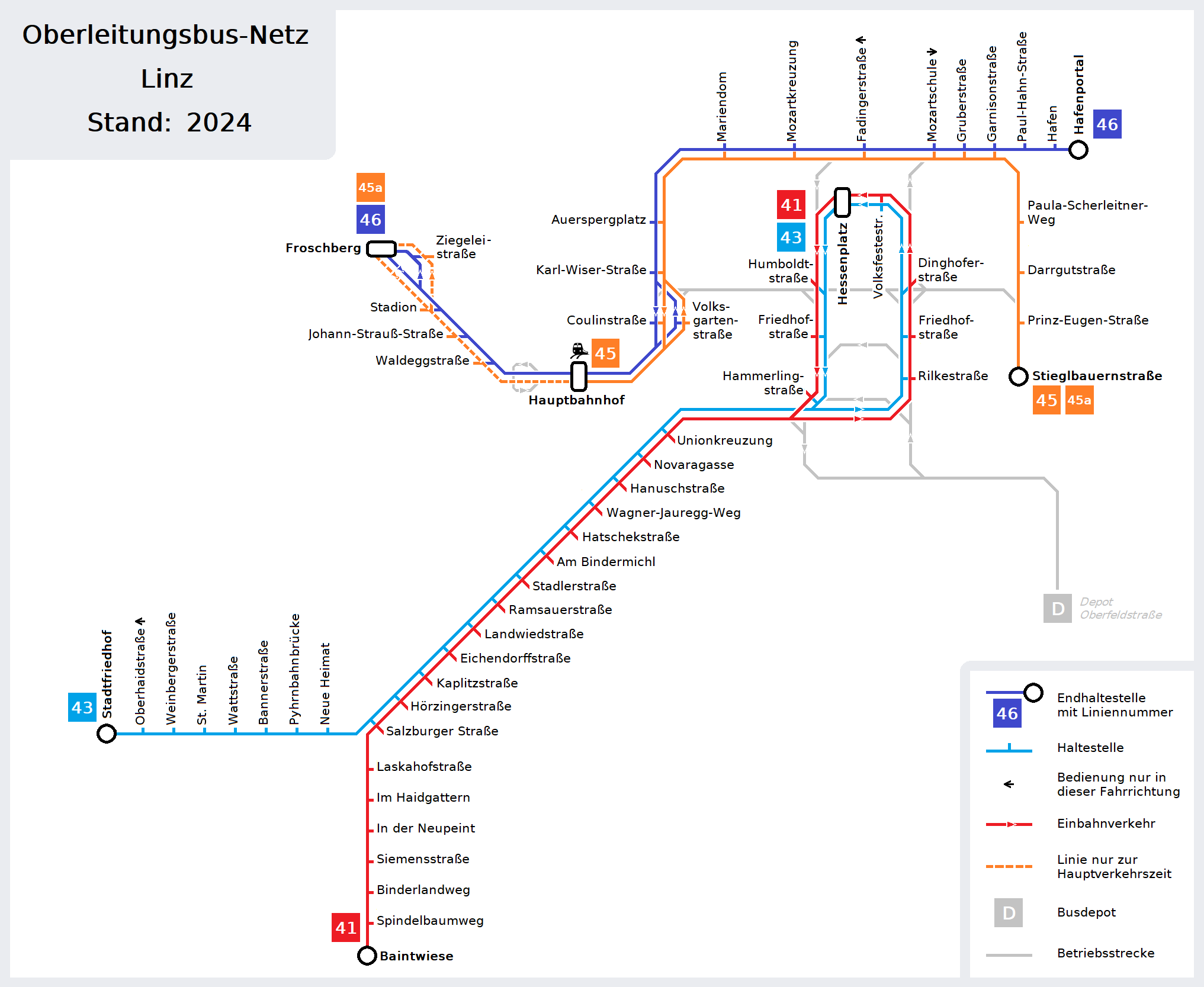
Linz trolleybus system map, 2024

The Linz trolleybus system forms part of the public transport network serving Linz, capital of the federal state of Upper Austria, in Austria. Trolleybus service began in 1944, and in 2025 the system comprises four routes, plus an evening variant of one.

== History ==
On 15 May 1944, trolleybus service was introduced in Linz on the Hessenplatz–St. Martin route, which is now part of route 43. On 28 September 1949, Froschberg–Volksgarten (now part of the route 46) route came into operation. Route 21 (Hafen–Hauptbahnhof) opened in 1991. It was replaced by route 46 in 2002.

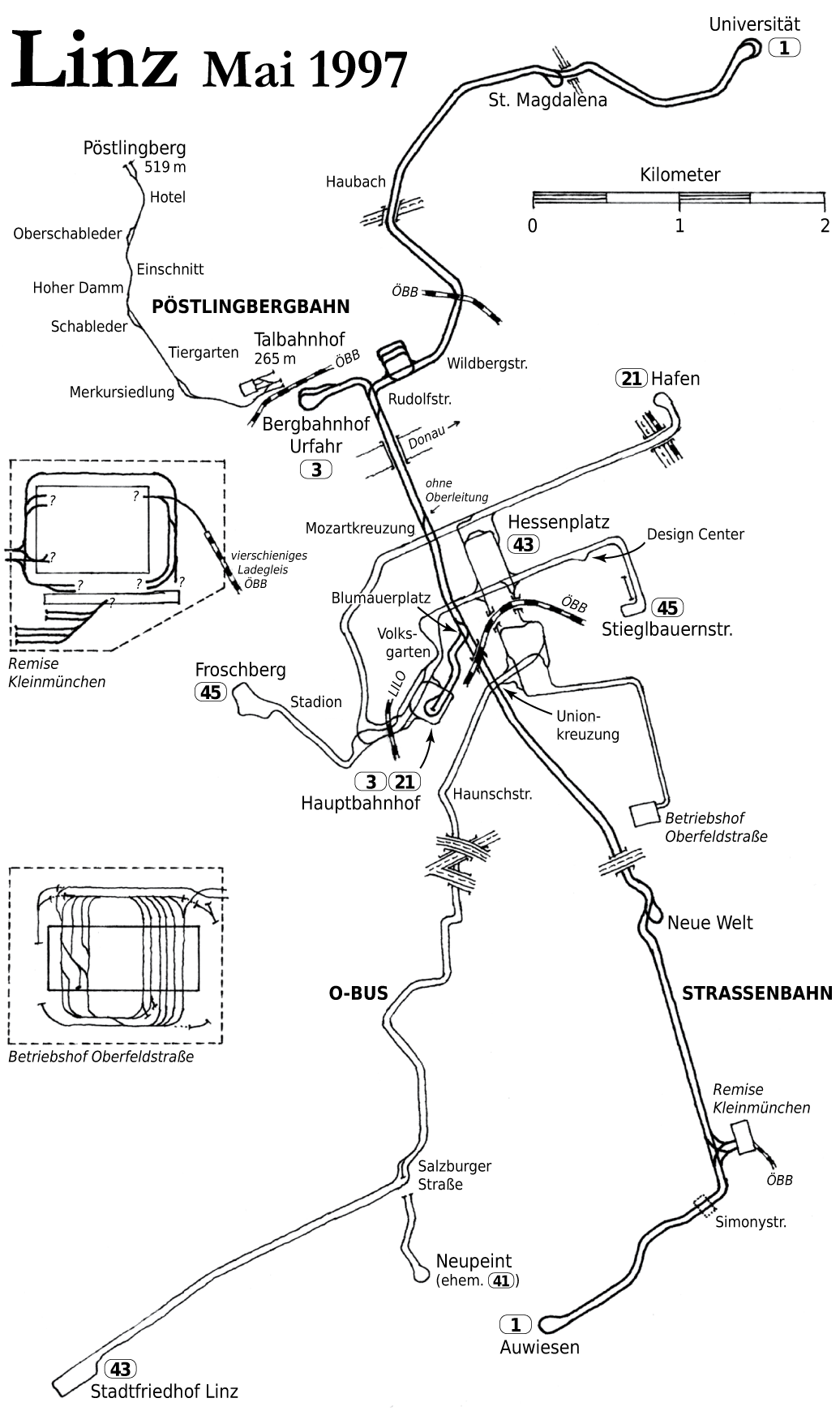
System map (tram and trolleybus lines), 1997

== Services ==
The five routes of the present Linz trolleybus system are as follows:

41	Hessenplatz – Unionkreuzung – Baintwiese	
43	Hessenplatz – Unionkreuzung – Stadtfriedhof St. Martin	
45	Stieglbauernstraße – Mozartkreuzung – Hauptbahnhof	from 1991 to 2002 part of route 21
45a	Stieglbauernstraße – Mozartkreuzung – Hauptbahnhof – Froschberg	operates only in the evening instead of route 45
46	Hafenportal – Mozartkreuzung – Hauptbahnhof – Froschberg	from 1991 to 2002 part of route 21

== Proposed expansion ==
In December 2019, plans for new extensions were presented. It is proposed to run a new route 48 from Karlhof via Kepler Klinikum and Bulgariplatz to Wiener Straße (WIFI/Linz AG).

== Fleet ==
=== Past fleet ===
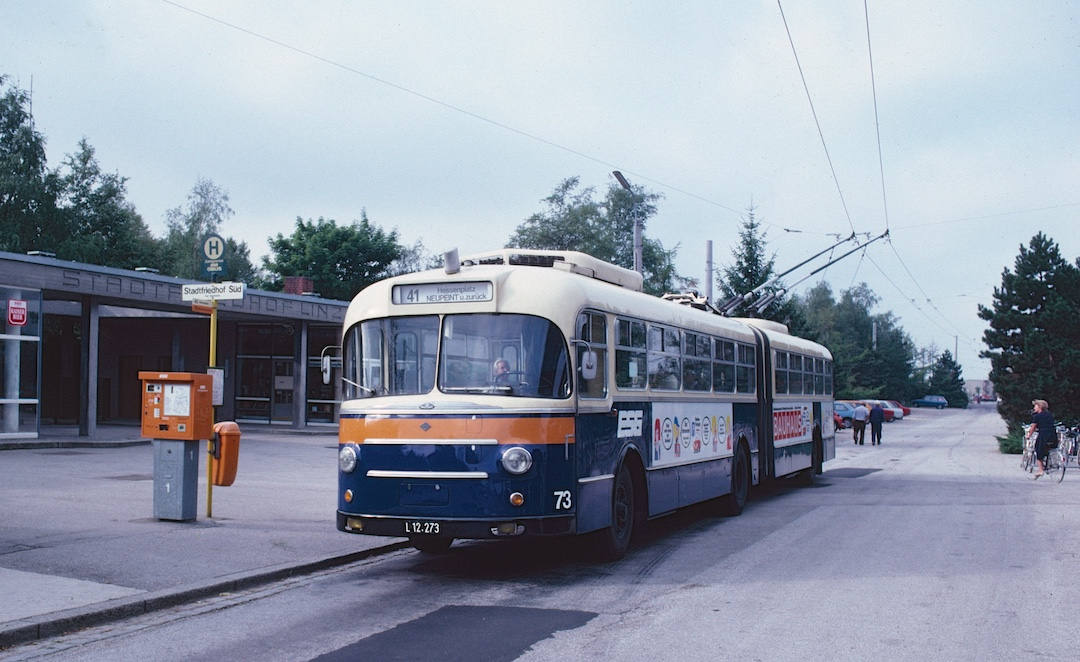
Gräf & Stift trolleybus 73 (built 1963) at Stadtfriedhof (City Cemetery) terminus in 1983

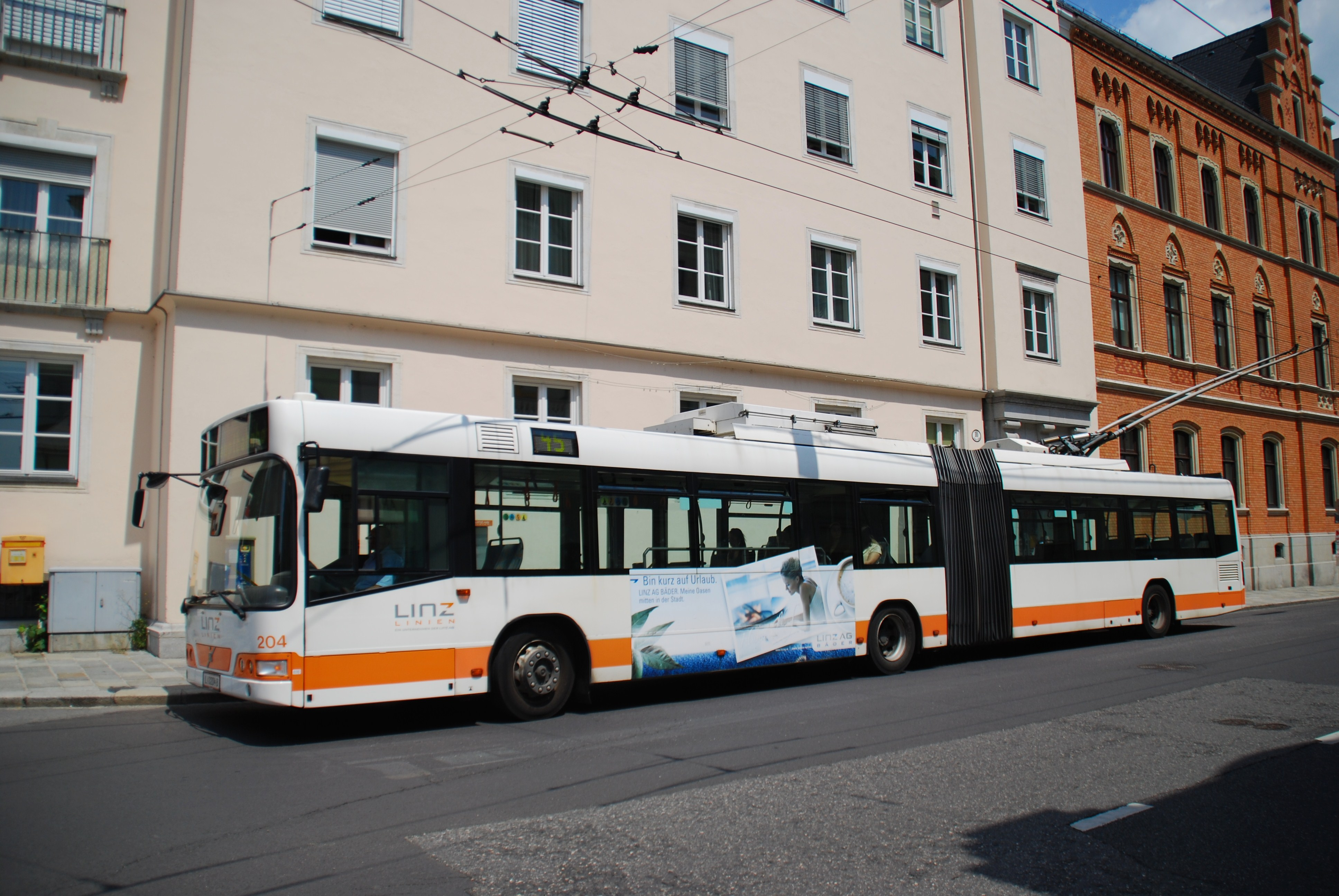
Volvo trolleybus 204 in 2009

After initially being composed of Italian-built trolleybuses diverted from Italian systems, until 1988 the Linz system's past fleet mostly comprised trolleybuses built in Austria by Gräf & Stift. A small number built by Steyr Bus entered service in 1988, and a larger batch built by Volvo Buses renewed the fleet in the early 2000s. When articulated vehicles comprised the majority of the fleet, from the 1960s to the 2000s (when the last non-articulated vehicles were retired), the two-axle trolleybuses were normally used on route 45, while the other routes used articulated vehicles.

- 10 Isotta Fraschini TSC40 two-axle vehicles, built 1937–1938, from either the Milan trolleybus system or the Livorno trolleybus system.
- 3 Alfa Romeo 110AF three-axle vehicles, nos. 11–13, built 1943, from the Rome trolleybus system. No. 13 was renumbered 10 in 1945, after the original no. 10 was destroyed in an airstrike.
- 20 Gräf & Stift/Brown, Boveri & Company (BBC) two-axle vehicles, nos. 13–32, built 1949. Most were retired by 1965, but nos. 29 and 22 were withdrawn in late 1966 and late 1967, respectively.
- 5 Gräf & Stift/BBC two-axle vehicles, nos. 33–37, built 1955 (first unit) and 1959. Retired between 1966 (no. 33) and 1975.
- 7 Gräf & Stift/BBC two-axle vehicles, nos. 41–47, built 1961/63.
- 3 Gräf & Stift/Kiepe two-axle vehicles, nos. 48–50, built 1969. These trolleybuses were withdrawn in 1988 and were the last Gräf & Stift vehicles in service in Linz.
- 18 Gräf & Stift/BBC articulated, nos. 51–68, built 1960/63.
- 2 Gräf & Stift/Kiepe articulated, nos. 69–70, built 1968.
- 3 Gräf & Stift/Kiepe articulated, nos. 71–73, built 1963.
- 3 Gräf & Stift/Kiepe articulated, nos. 74–76, built 1967.
- 1 Gräf & Stift/Kiepe articulated, no. 77, built 1969. After retirement in 1984, 19 of the 27 trolleybuses of series 51–77 were sold the to Sofia trolleybus system, in Bulgaria, for use there.
- 20 Gräf & Stift/Kiepe articulated, nos. 201–220, built 1983–1985, replacing all remaining 1960s-era articulated trolleybuses in the fleet (series 51–77) by the end of 1984. The last three active units from this series were withdrawn around August 2001, and 14 were sold to the Vologda trolleybus system, in Russia, later that year.
- 4 Steyr/Kiepe two-axle vehicles, nos. 240–243, built 1988. Entered service in 1988. Last units withdrawn in 2003, and in 2005 were sold to the Rostov-on-Don trolleybus system, in Russia.
- 19 Volvo B7000/Kiepe (also referred to as model V 7000 AT) low-floor, articulated, nos. 201–219, built 2000–2001. First units entered service in 2000. The last Volvo trolleybuses were retired in 2019, their last day of service being 26 March 2019. At least seven were sold to the Ivano-Frankivsk trolleybus system, in Ukraine.

=== Current fleet ===
The present fleet comprises 20 Van Hool ExquiCity 24T double-articulated, low-floor trolleybuses numbered 221–240, built in 2017–2019. The first two examples were delivered in 2017 and no. 222 entered service on 28 November 2017. Delivery of the others began in June 2018, and the last of the 20 had arrived by March 2019.
