= PlusCity =

Shopping centre Upper Austria, Austria

Coordinates: 48°14′36″N 14°14′10″E

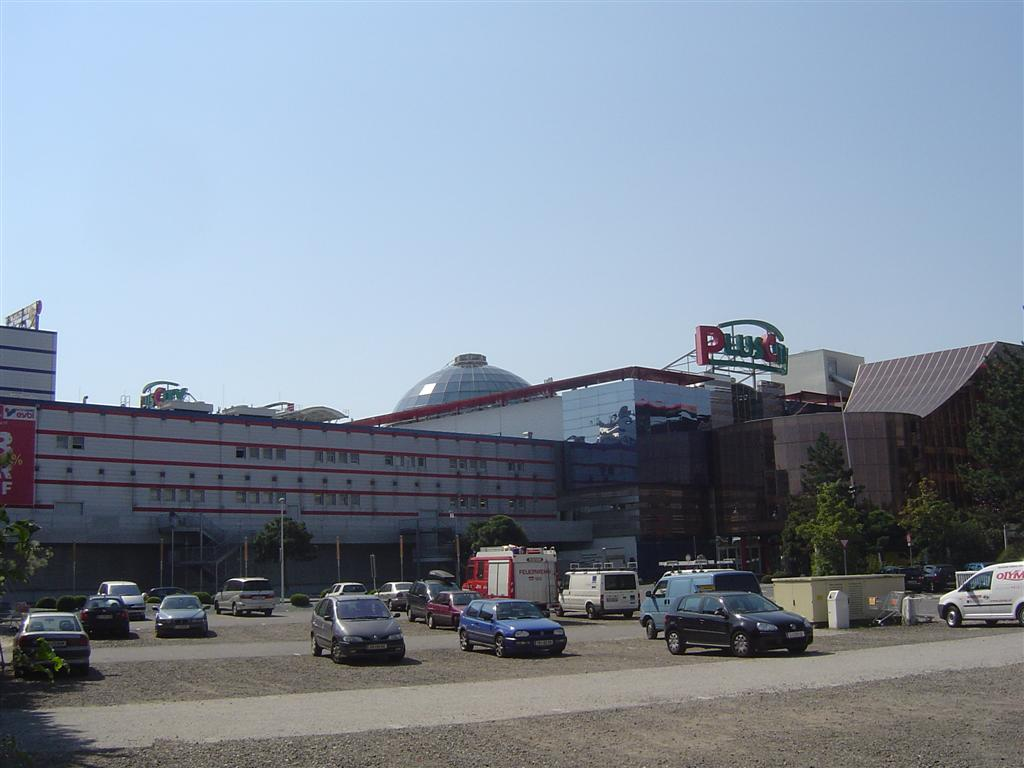
PlusCity backside parking lot and entrance

PlusCity is a shopping centre in Pasching in Upper Austria. It is located southwest of Linz and opened in October 1989.

It has a total retail floor area of approximately 70,000 square meters on two main floors, which makes it the fifth largest mall in Austria. It houses about 200 stores and offers employment for 2,100 people.

There are 4,200 parking spaces. Customer frequency is approximately 20,000 per day.
