= Linz AG =

Austrian public utility company

- Company type: Aktiengesellschaft
- Industry: Energy supply; Municipal services; Public transport
- Predecessor: Elektrizitäts-, Fernwärme und Verkehrsbetriebe AG; Stadtbetriebe Linz
- Founded: 2000
- Headquarters: Linz, Austria
- Area served: Linz and neighbouring parts of Upper Austria
- Website: https://www.linzag.at/

Linz AG, or LINZ AG, is a city-owned company providing energy supply, municipal services and public transport in the city of Linz and another 115 municipalities in Upper Austria. It was created in October 2000 from the former individual companies Elektrizitäts-, Fernwärme und Verkehrsbetriebe AG and Stadtbetriebe Linz. Besides the holding company, there are a number of subsidiary companies covering different operations. These include Linz Strom Gas Wärme Gmbh, Linz Netz Gmbh, Linz Service Gmbh and Linz Linien Gmbh.

== Operations ==
=== Energy supply ===
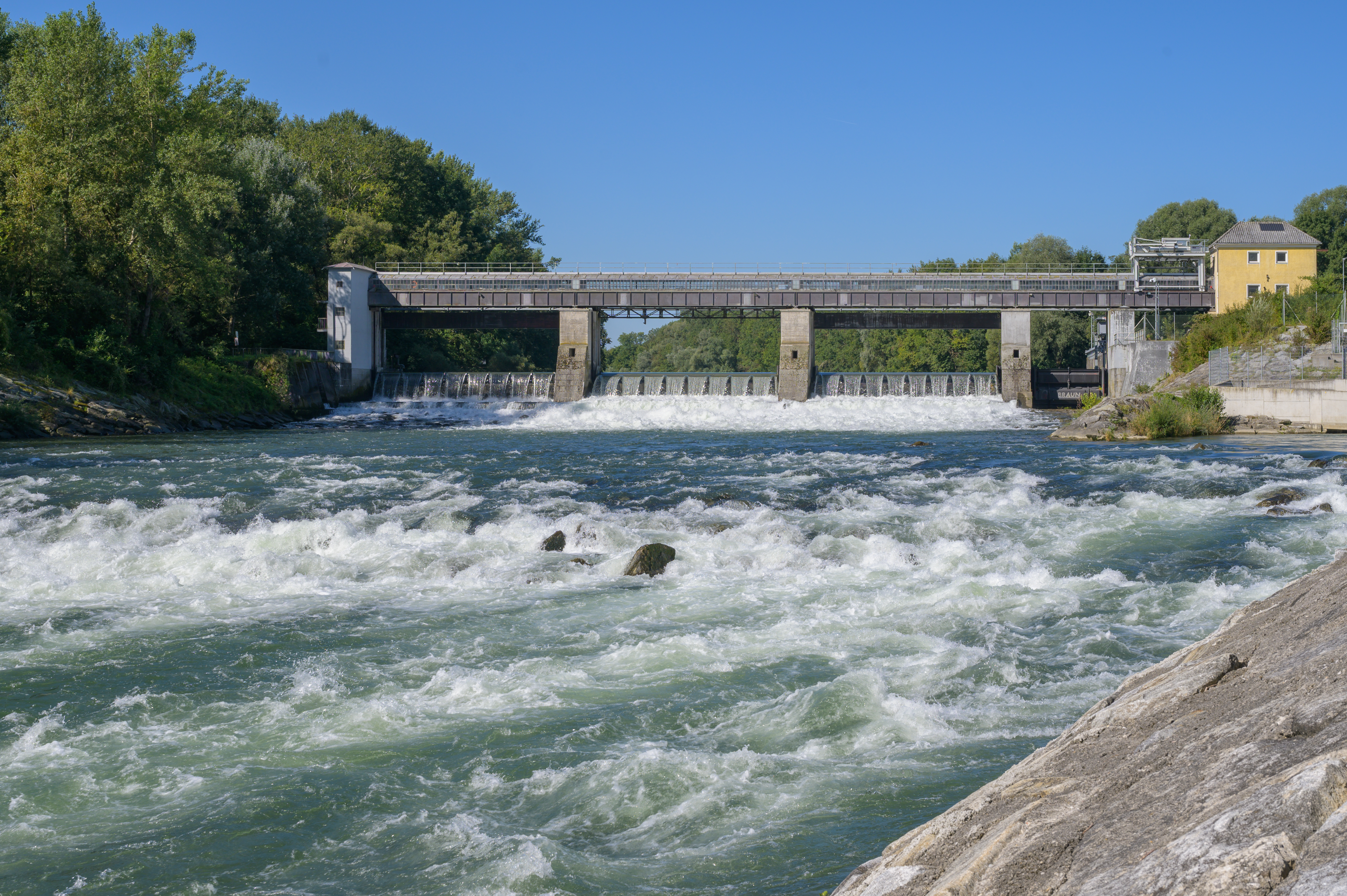
One of Linz AG's hydro-electric plants

The Linz Strom Gas Wärme Gmbh subsidiary of Linz AG includes an energy trading business, which markets the electricity generation and gas storage capabilities of the group. The company also operates a number of combined heat a power plants, district heating plants and hydro-electric power plants, together with a biomass fuelled power plant and a residual material heating plant fuelled by waste. The Linz Netz Gmbh subsidiary of Linz AG is responsible for the supply and delivery of electricity and natural gas to consumers.

=== Municipal services ===
The Linz Service Gmbh subsidiary of Linz AG is responsible for water supply and sewage disposal, as well as other municipal services including baths, funerals and cemeteries. It also operates the Port of Linz.

=== Public transport ===
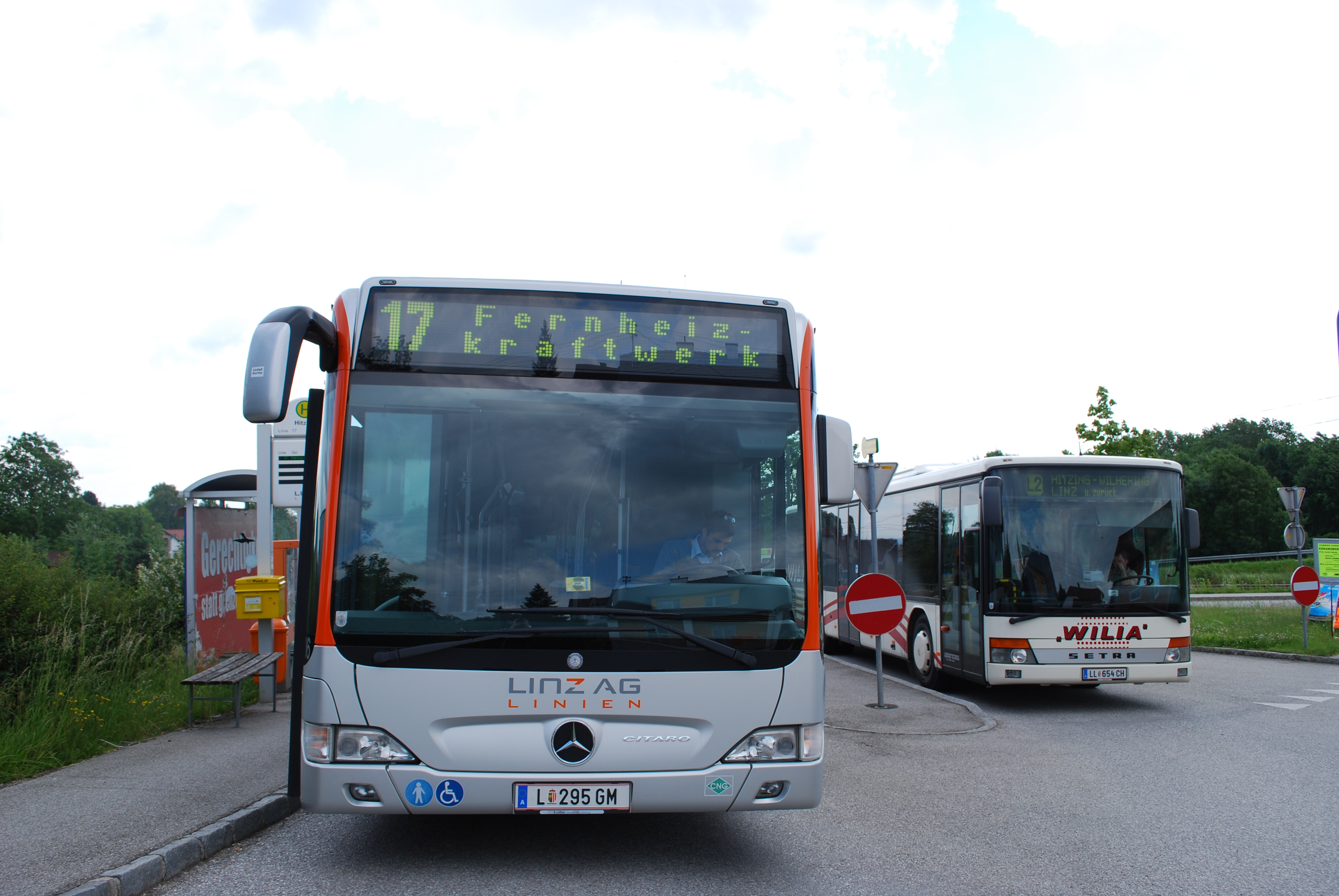
One of Linz AG's buses

The Linz Linien Gmbh subsidiary of Linz AG is responsible for operating the Linz tram network, the Linz trolleybus network and the Linz citybus network. The tram network consists of four lines, including the Pöstlingbergbahn mountain tramway, whilst there are five trolleybus lines, 11 regular bus routes, and five express bus routes.
