= Two-thousander =

Mountains between 2000 and 3000 meters high

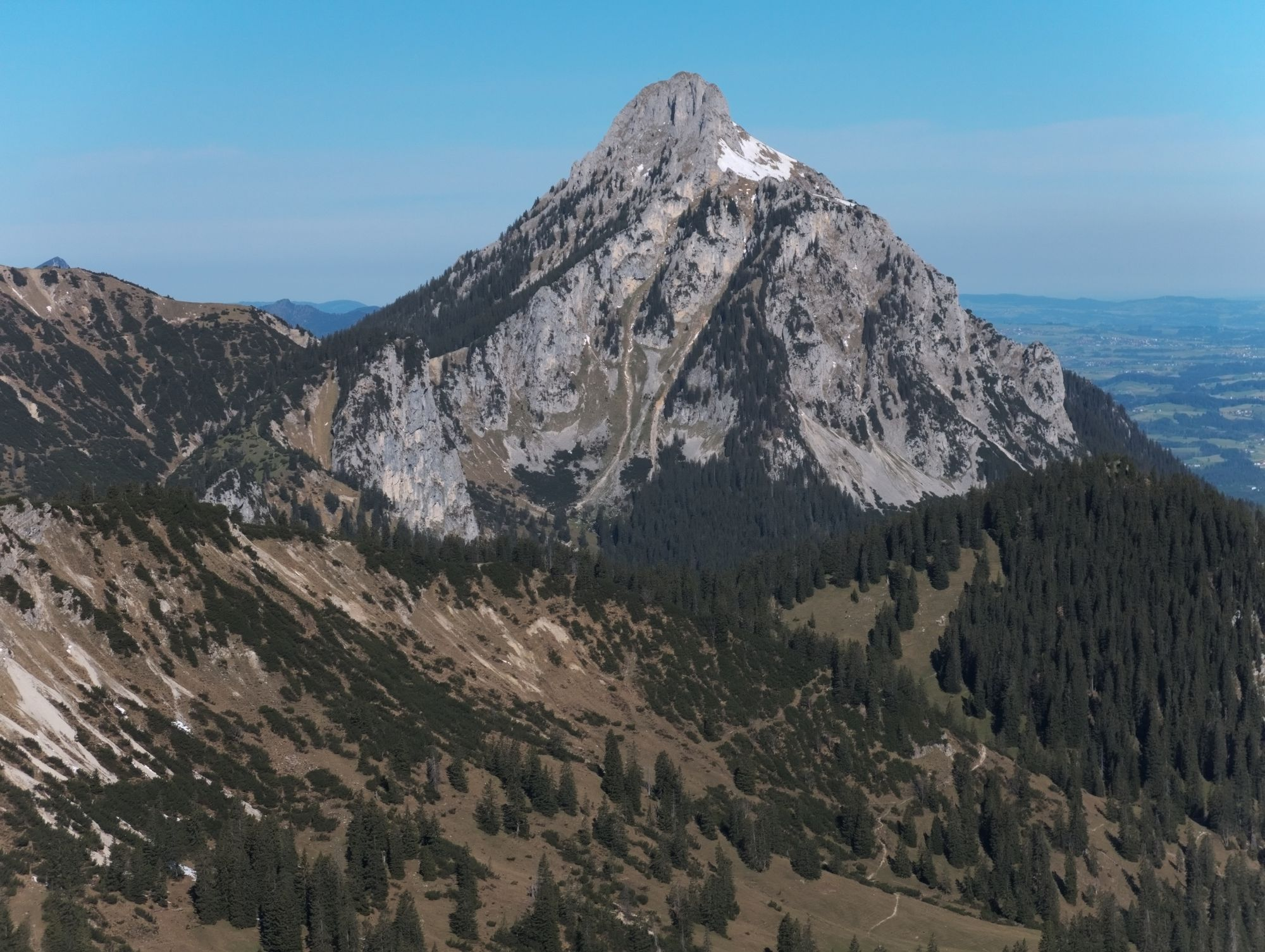
The Säuling in the Ammergau Alps (east flank) (2,047 m)

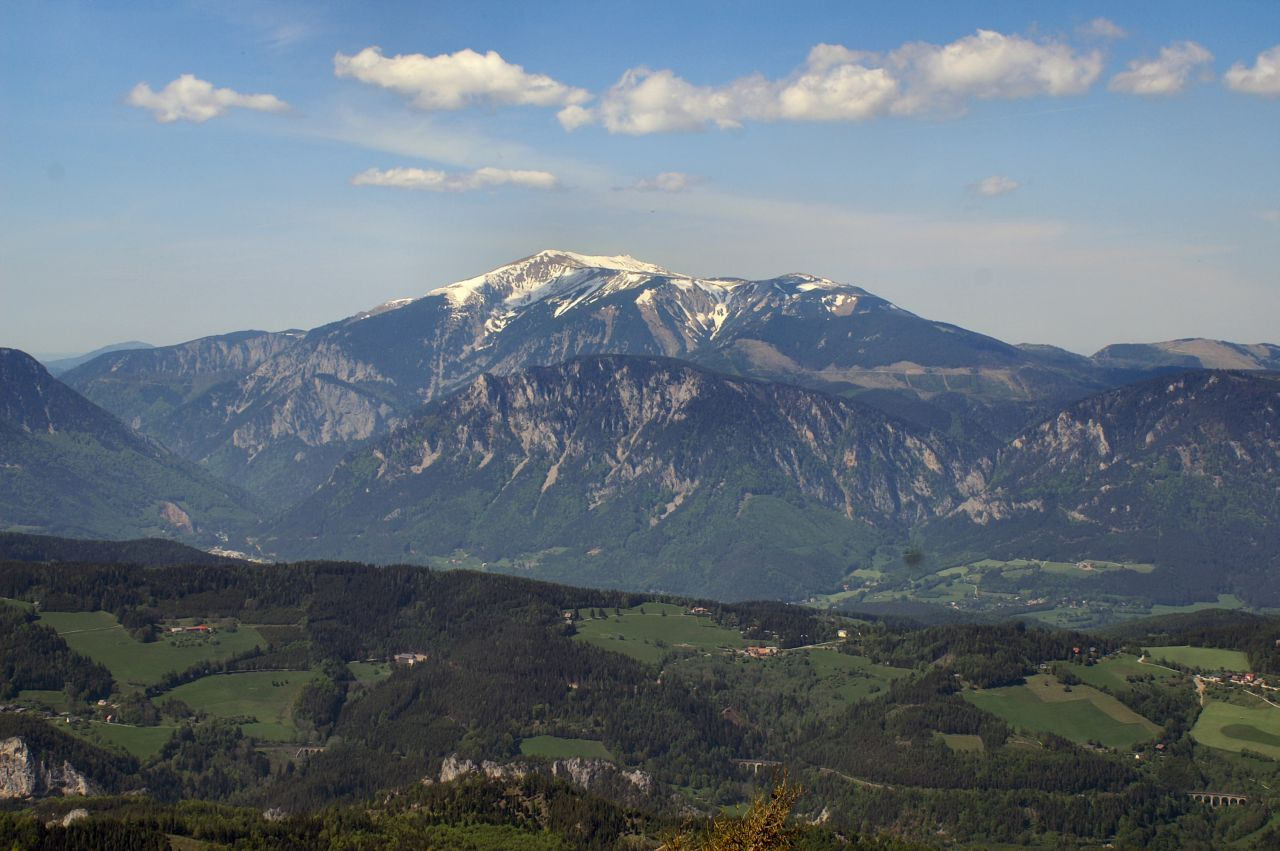
The Schneeberg (2,076 m), seen from the south (Semmering)

Two-thousanders are mountains that have a height of at least 2,000 metres above sea level, but less than 3,000 metres. The term is used in Alpine circles, especially in Europe (e.g. German: Zweitausender).

The two photographs show two typical two-thousanders in the Alps, illustrating different types of mountain. The Säuling (top) is a prominent, individual peak, whereas the Schneeberg (bottom) is an elongated limestone massif.

In ranges like the Allgäu Alps, the Gesäuse or the Styrian-Lower Austrian Limestone Alps the mountain tour descriptions for mountaineers or hikers commonly include the two-thousanders, especially in areas where only a few summits exceed this level. Examples from these regions of the Eastern Alps are:

- the striking Nebelhorn (2,224 m) near Oberstdorf or the Säuling (2,047 m) near Neuschwanstein,
- the Admonter Reichenstein (2,251 m), Eisenerzer Reichenstein (2,165 m), Großer Pyhrgas (2,244 m) or Hochtor (2,369 m),
- the Hochschwab (2,277 m) and Vienna's local mountains, the Schneeberg (2,076 m) and the Rax (2,007 m).

The last-mentioned two are also the easternmost two-thousanders in the Alps, before their foothills descend to the Carpathians and into the Pannonian Plain. Analogous examples may also be found in the Western Alps, but are rarer as the peaks are generally higher. In the Carpathians, two-thousanders dominate large regions of highland, for example in Slovakia (including mountains in the High Tatra, Beskids and Low Tatra).

There are no mountains in the UK that reach 2,000 metres. However the term is sometimes used there to refer to mountains over 2,000 ft (610 m) in height.

== See also ==
- Three-thousanders
- Four-thousanders
- Eight-thousanders
