= Gustav Jahn =

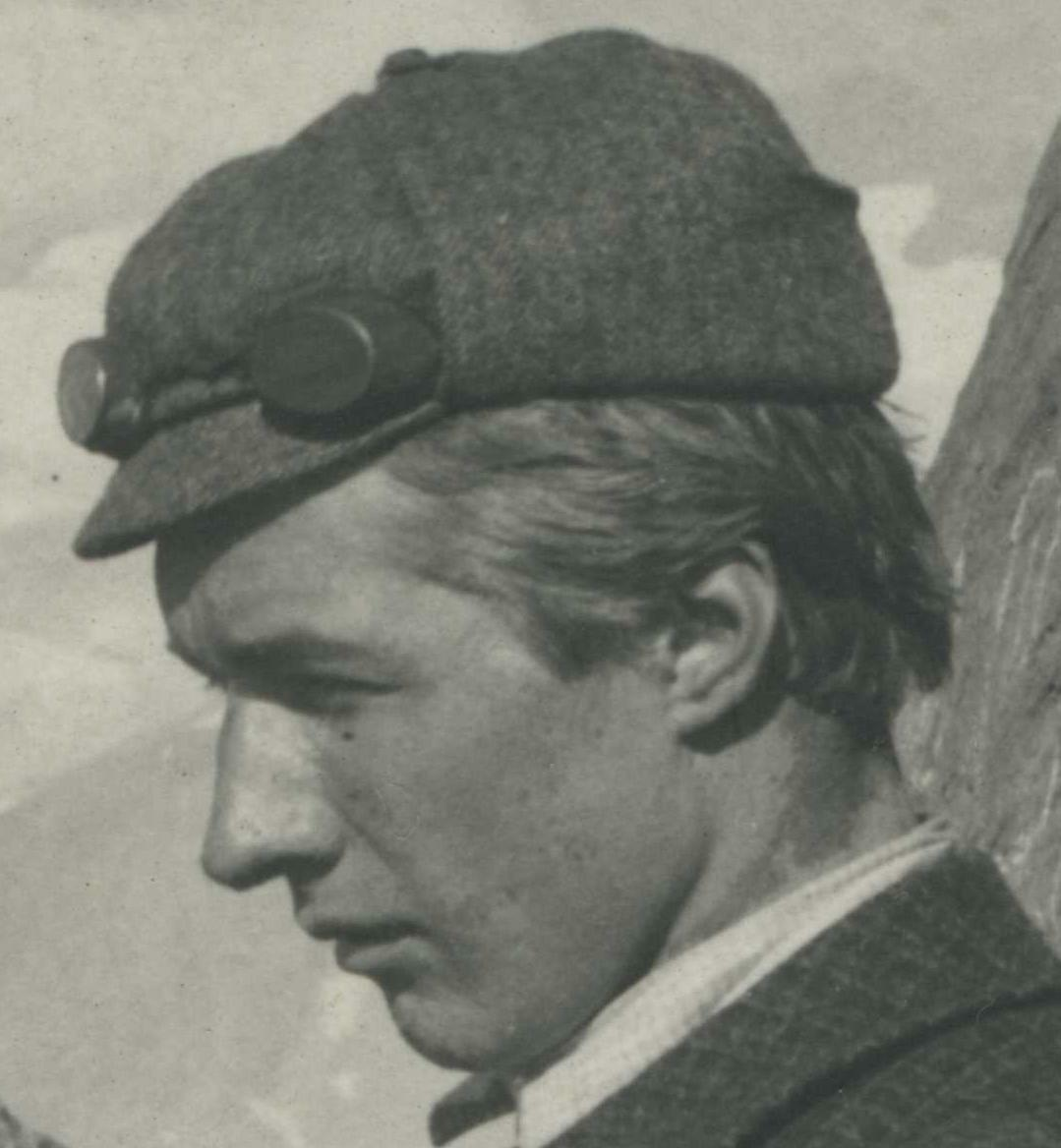
- Jahn in 1905

Personal information
- Nationality: Austrian
- Born: 17 May 1879 Vienna, Austria-Hungary
- Died: 17 August 1919 (aged 40)

Gustav Jahn (17 May 1879 – 17 August 1919) was an Austrian landscape painter, poster artist and mountaineer.

== Early life and education ==
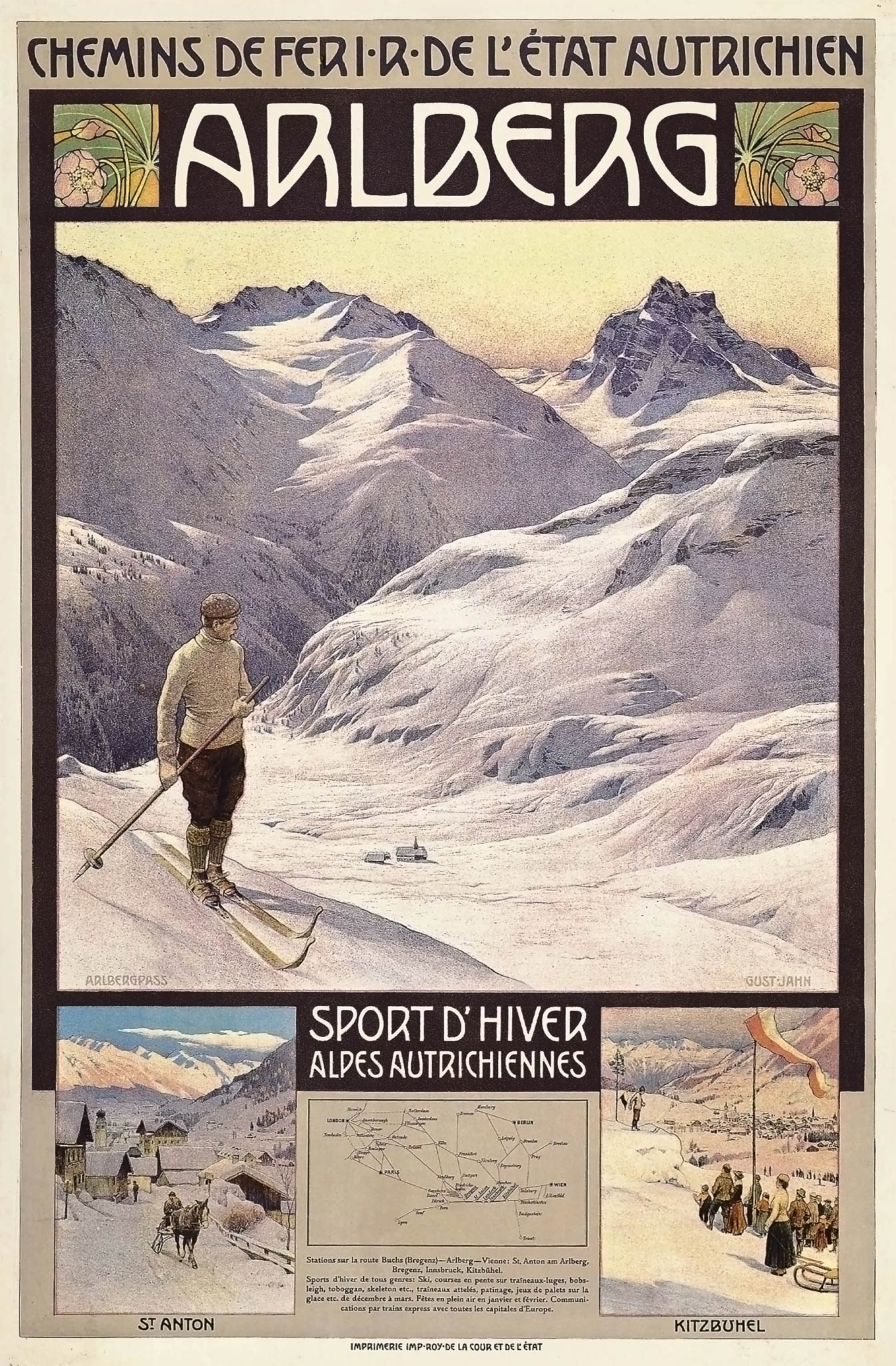
State Railways Poster

Gustav Jahn was born in 1879 in Vienna. From his youth, his true passion was mountaineering. He attended the private art school operated by Adolf Kaufmann starting in 1895. Then in 1896, at age 16, he was admitted to the Academy of Fine Arts, Vienna, studying with August Eisenmenger and Alois Delug. He was awarded the Gundel-Prize for excellence in 1899.

From 1900 to 1904, he studied with genre painter Franz Rumpler, and he became a member of the prestigious Austrian Alpine Club in 1901. He combined his interests by specializing in landscapes and genre scenes of the high mountains. As part of the Rome Prize, he won a Kenyon study scholarship in 1904, which he used more for climbing in the Mont Blanc area than painting.

== Career ==
Within ten weeks Jahn painted twelve large-format paintings depicting Austrian life and scenery with people in traditional costumes, which won awards at the World Fair of Saint Louis in 1904. The cycle is lost except for one copy. Starting in 1898 as a student, he furnished the illustrations for the catalogs of "Bergsporthaus", a store selling mountaineering equipment owned by ski racer Mizzi Langer-Kauba, which was the first of its kind in Vienna. Jahn was close friends with the painter Otto Barth, who also was an enthusiastic mountaineer.

In 1907, the 28-year-old painter and graphic artist was so well known, that he was awarded a major contract to advertise newly completed Alpine railway lines for the Imperial Royal Austrian State Railways. Jahn presented these in Art Nouveau style, as was typical in Austria for public contracts. While his sheets still had the effect of paintings and were not really flat and "poster like", their design was intended for indoor advertising at stations, for which the decorative character was in the foreground. 16 of the series have been preserved.

His favorite mountaineering areas were the Rax and Schneeberg, Gesäuse, Dachstein and the Dolomites. He participated in the first ascent of the Große Bischofsmütze.

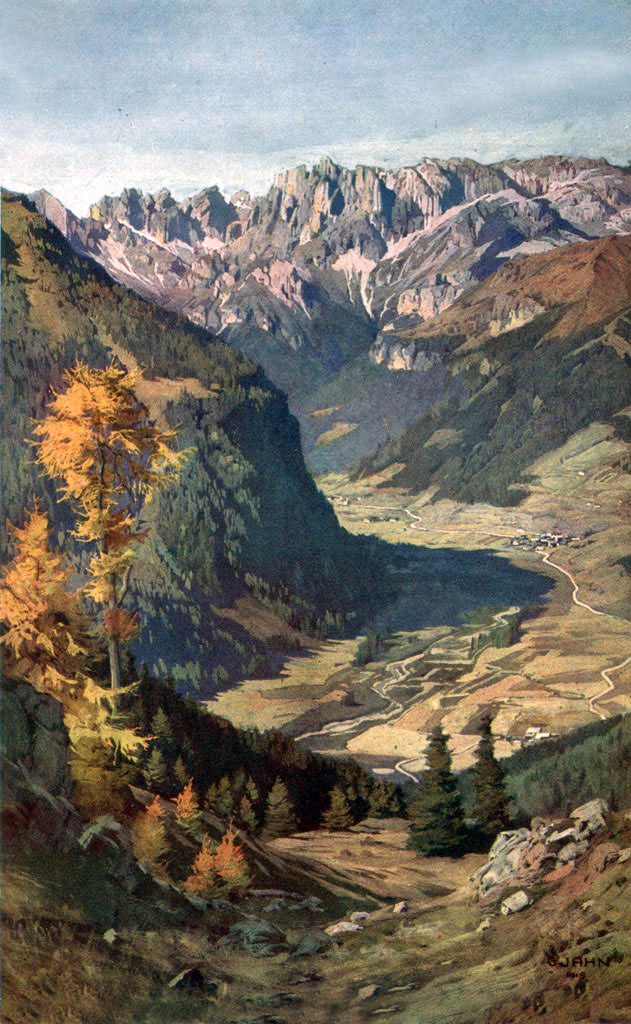
Fassa Valley with a view of the Rosengarten Group

Jahn was a committed skier and ski jumper winning over twenty-eight awards during the course of his career. These achievements led to his serving as an instruction officer during World War I teaching mountain warfare in the Dolomites, a time during which he also painted on the side.

In August 1919, he and his climbing partner, Michael Kofler rode the train to Gstatterboden for a climbing tour. After successfully climbing the Hochtor north face, the two wanted to climb the northwest ridge of the Ödstein, but suffered a fatal fall of 400 meters. The cause of their fall remains unclear. It probably occurred at a key point of the wall, the Preuss crossing, which is difficult to secure (climbing grade IV-V). He was buried at the Bergsteigerfriedhof in Johnsbach.

== Legacy ==
Jahn inspired younger painters to paint like him, for example Stoibner or Emmerich Schaffran. He popularized mountaineering at a time when wider society made fun of rock climbing.

A climbing route on the North face of the Hochtor is named after him (Jahnweg), as well as on the south face of the Große Bischofsmütze.
