= Ennstal Alps =

- German: Ennstaler Alpen
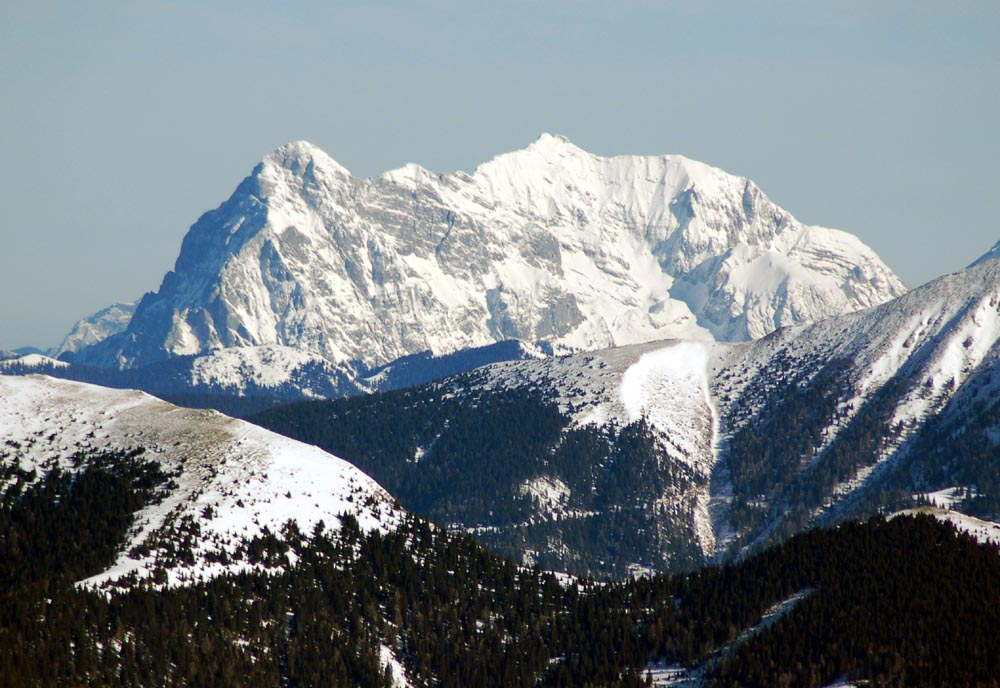
- Hochtor - Ödstein Group (Gesäuse) (from right to left) as seen from Hoher Zinken in the south

Highest point
- Peak: Hochtor
- Elevation: 2,369 m (7,772 ft)
- Coordinates: 47°33′42″N 14°37′50″E

Geography
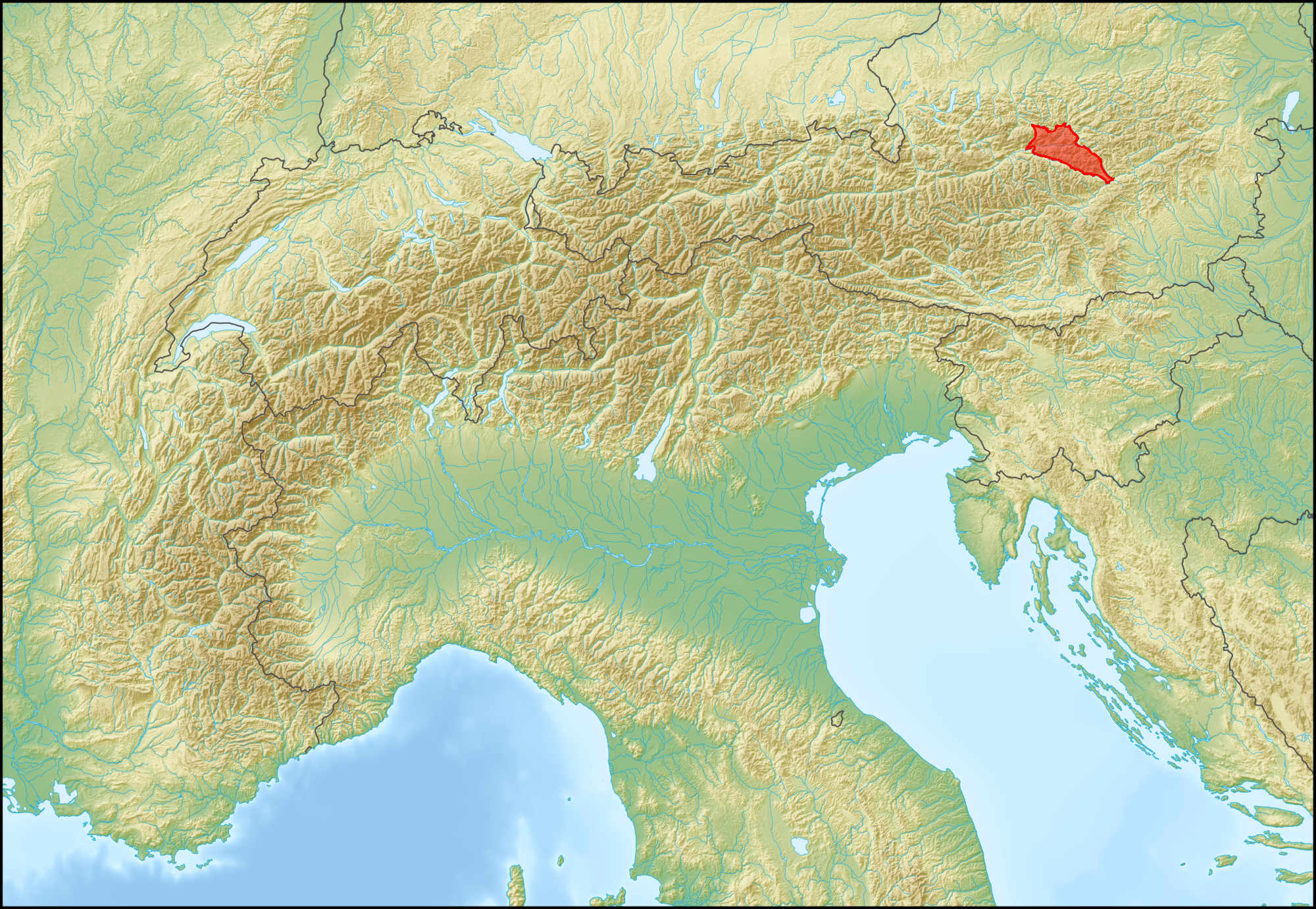
- Ennstal Alps (in red) within the Alps. The borders of the range according to Alpine Club classification of the Eastern Alps
- Country: Austria
- States: Styria and Upper Austria
- Range coordinates: 47°37′N 14°35′E
- Parent range: Northern Limestone Alps

The Ennstal Alps (German Ennstaler Alpen), the Alps of the Enns valley, are a mountain range of the Northern Limestone Alps System. They are located primarily in the Austrian state of Styria, and also into the state of Upper Austria.

The most famous scenery in the Ennstal Alps is the Gesäuse, a valley where the Enns river cuts through the limestone.

== Geography ==
The Ennstal Alps range is defined by:

- the lineup of Liezen, Pyhrn Pass, and Windischgarsten on the west.
- Hengst Pass and the Laussabach on the north.
- the lineup of the River Enns (from Altenmarkt bei Sankt Gallen to Hieflau), Erzbach, and Vordernbergerbach on the east
- the lineup of the Mur river (from Leoben to Sankt Michael in Obersteiermark), Liesing, and Palten on the south

=== Peaks + mountain groups ===
Mountain groups that are part of the Ennstal Alps include:

- Haller Mauern (highest summit: Großer Pyhrgas, 2,244 m)
- Gesäuse Mountains, including the Buchstein Group (2,224 m), Reichenstein Group (2.251 m) and Hochtor Group (Hochtor, 2,369 m) and the Lugauer (2,217 m).
- Eisenerzer Reichenstein 2,165 m (Eisenerz Alps), with the preceding massifs of Reiting (including the Gößeck its main summit, 2,214 m) (in the south) and the Kaiserschild (2,105 m) in the north.

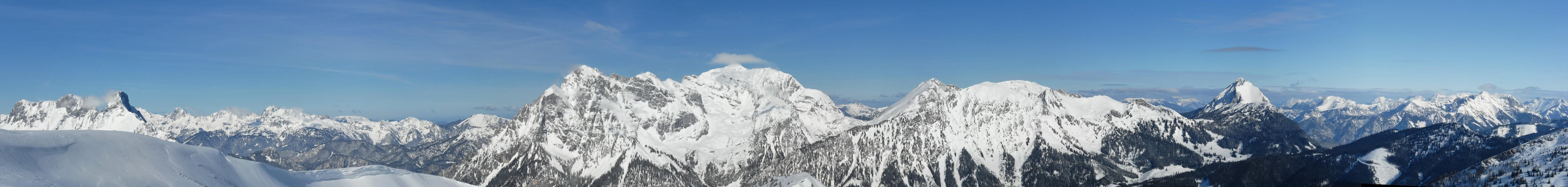
Panoramic view of the Ennstal Alps.

=== Gesäuse − Enns river valley ===
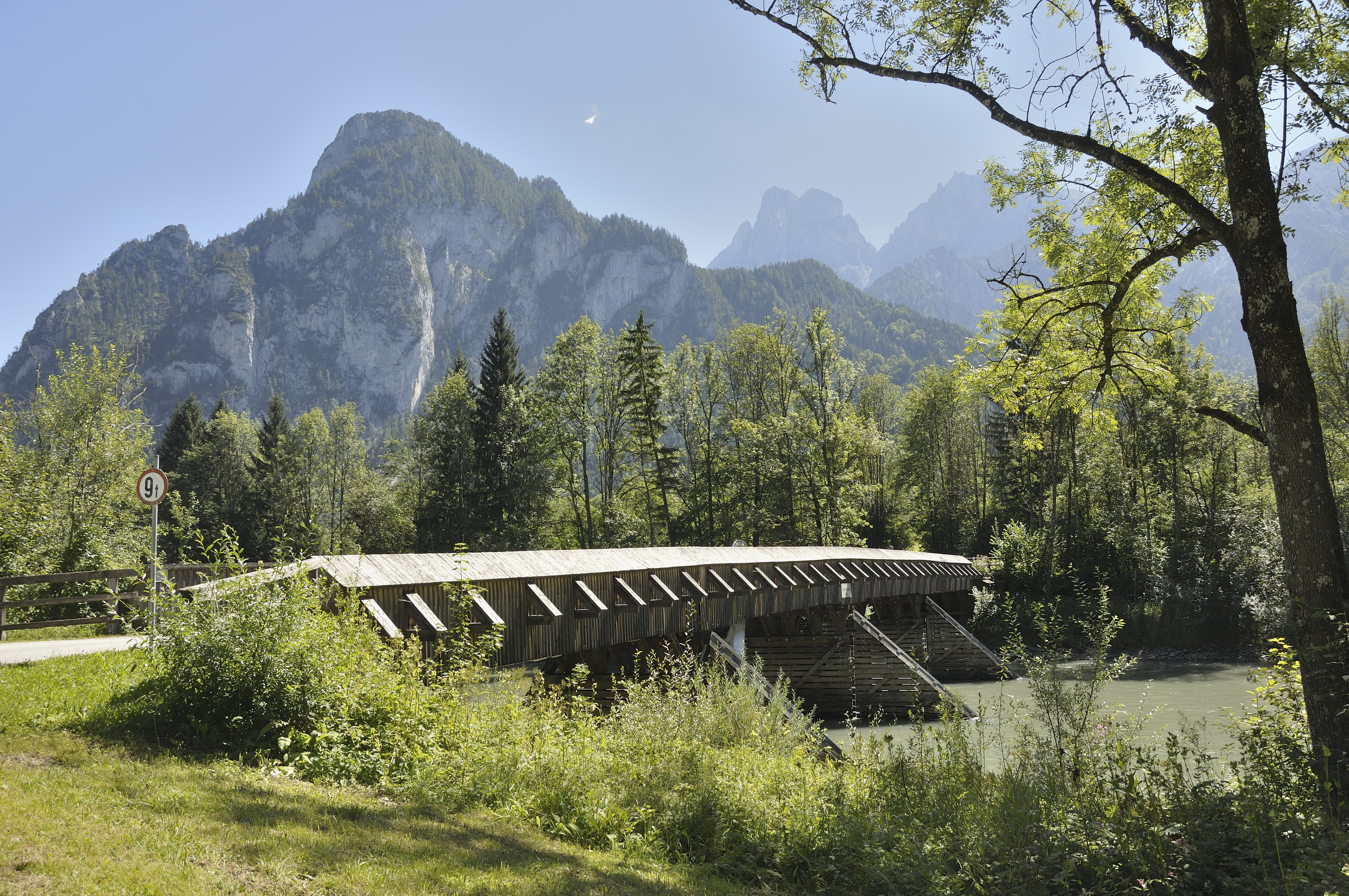
Gesäuse, the Enns river valley in the Ennstal Alps.

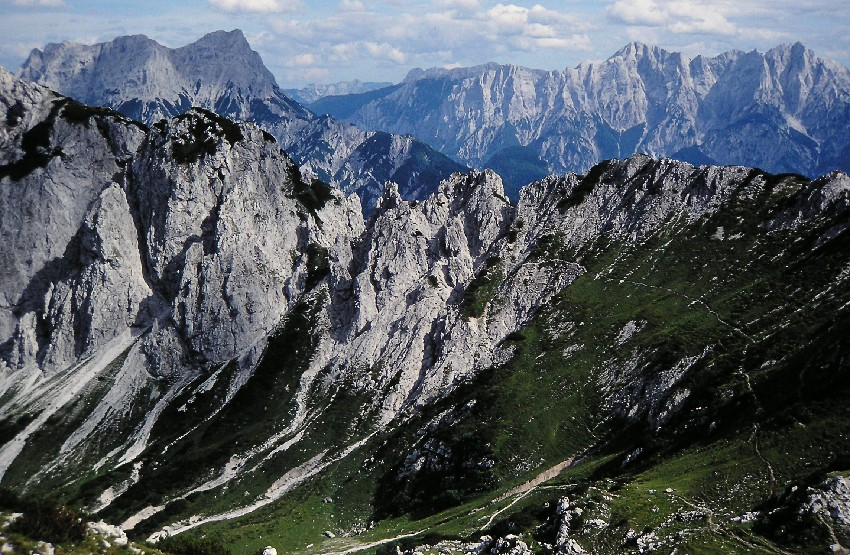
View over the ridge of the Haller Mauern (Admonter Warte) to the Gesäuse Mountains.

The Ennstal Alps range is pierced in the north by the Enns river. The Enns river valley name in German is Gesäuse. The valley is accompanied by the only roads and railway lines that run through the Ennstal Alps.

=== Adjacent mountain ranges ===
Other Alps mountain ranges that border on the Ennstal Alps include:

- Upper Austrian Prealps (to the north)
- Ybbstal Alps (to the northeast)
- Hochschwab (to the east)
- Lavanttal Alps (to the southeast)
- Seckauer Tauern (to the south)
- Rottenmanner and Wölzer Tauern (to the southwest)
- Totes Gebirge (to the west)

=== Settlements ===
Settlement within the range is restricted to the Gesäuse and several mountain valleys.

- The main villages within the Gesäuse are Admont, Hieflau, and Großreifling.
- Settlements in the mountain valleys include: Radmer, Johnsbach, and St. Gallen.

Towns in valleys around the perimeter of the range include: Leoben, Liezen, and Eisenerz.

== See also ==
- Limestone Alps
- Mountain ranges of the Alps

Media related to Ennstaler Alpen at Wikimedia Commons
