= Hall bei Admont =

Hall
- Former municipality
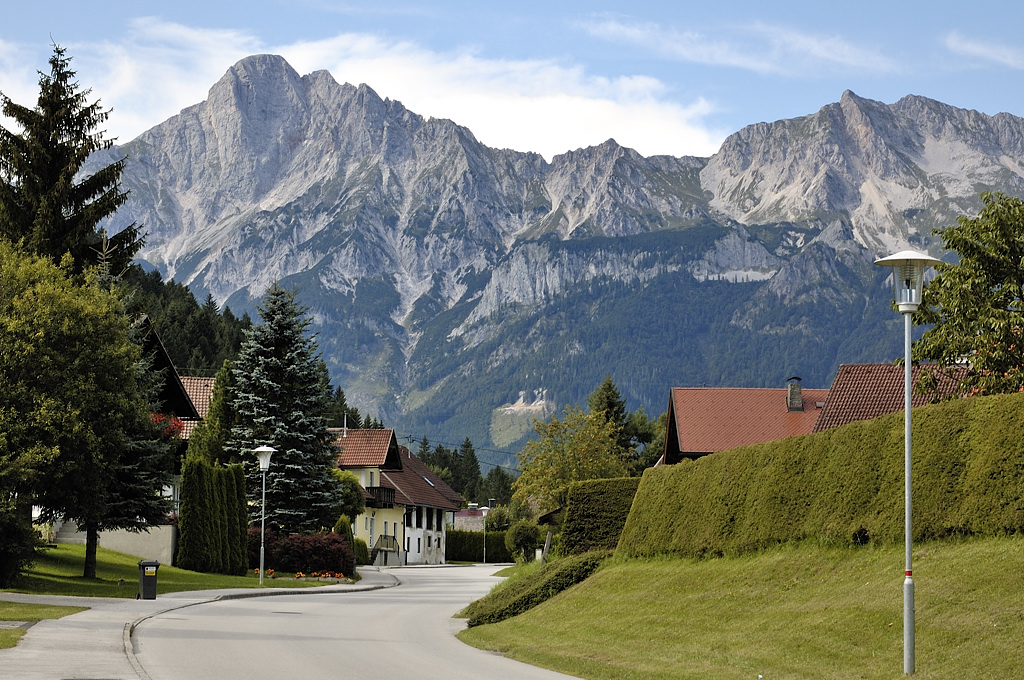

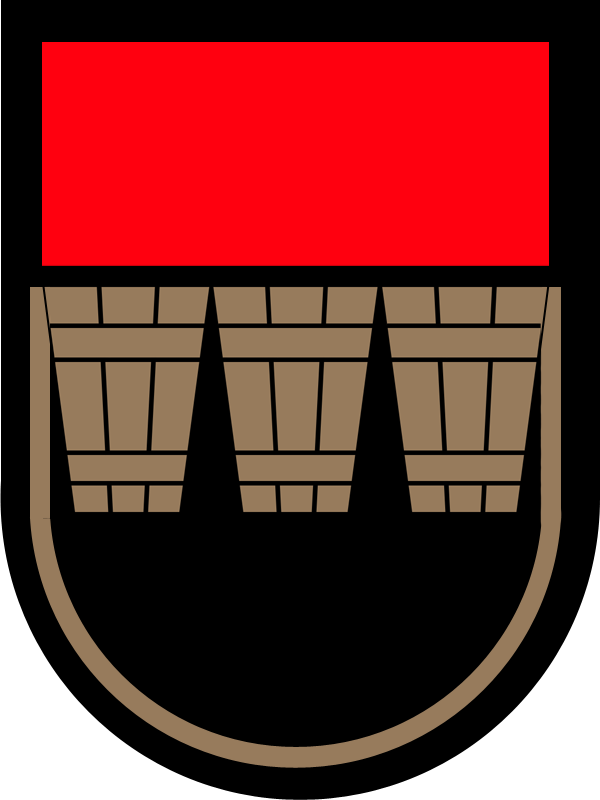
- Coat of arms

- Location within Austria
- Coordinates: 47°35′56″N 14°27′34″E
- Country: Austria
- State: Styria
- District: Liezen

Area
  - Total: 50.72 km^{2} (19.58 sq mi)
- Elevation: 634 m (2,080 ft)

Population (1 January 2016)
  - Total: 1,744
  - Density: 34.38/km^{2} (89.06/sq mi)
- Time zone: UTC+1 (CET)
  - Summer (DST): UTC+2 (CEST)
- Postal code: 8911
- Area code: 03613
- Vehicle registration: LI
- Website: www.gemeinde-hall.at/

Hall bei Admont is a former municipality in Liezen district in the Austrian Styria at the foot of the Haller Mauern on the Enns River. Since the 2015 Styria municipal structural reform, it is part of the municipality Admont.

It has the oldest salt mine in Styria, as mentioned in a 931 document, which operated until 1543.

== Geography ==
Hall lies on the left bank of the Enns just across from Admont.
