= Reinstein =

Reinstein is a surname. Notable people with the surname include:

- Dan Reinstein (born 1962), Peruvian-born ophthalmic surgeon and specialist ophthalmologist in the US, Canada and the UK
- Josh Reinstein, Director of the Knesset Christian Allies Caucus and President of the Israel Allies Foundation
- Julia Boyer Reinstein (1906–1998), American teacher and historian
- Kathi-Anne Reinstein, former American state legislator in the Massachusetts House of Representatives
- Linda Reinstein (born 1955), co-founder of the Asbestos Disease Awareness Organization (ADAO)
- Michael Reinstein, American businessman, lawyer, private equity executive and founder and Chairman of Regent, L.P.
- William Reinstein (1939–1998), American politician, member of the Massachusetts House of Representatives and Mayor of Revere, Massachusetts

== See also ==
- Reinstein Woods Nature Preserve, located near the city of Buffalo in the Town of Cheektowaga in Erie County, New York, USA
- Reichenstein (disambiguation)
- Reifenstein (disambiguation)
- Reiffenstein
- Reitzenstein
