= Reichenstein =

Reichenstein may refer to:

== Places ==
- Reichenstein, in Silesia, now Złoty Stok, Poland
- Reichenstein, in Bohemia, now Rejštejn, Czech Republic
- Reichenstein, in Zweisimmen, Bernese Oberland, Switzerland
- Lordship of Reichenstein, a lordship in the Lower Rhenish–Westphalian Circle of the Holy Roman Empire
- Golden Mountains (Sudetes), on the border of Czech Republic and Poland
- Eisenerzer Reichenstein in the Ennstal Alps, Styria, Austria, the location of the Reichenstein Smeltery
- Admonter Reichenstein in the Ennstal Alps, Styria, Austria

== Buildings ==
- Burg Reichenstein (Oberpfalz), a castle in Stadlern, Bavaria, Germany
- Reichenstein Castle (Trechtingshausen), a castle in Rhineland-Palatinate, Germany
- Reichenstein Castle (Arlesheim), a castle in Arlesheim, Basel Canton, Switzerland
- Reichenstein Castle (Westerwald), a castle in Rhineland-Palatinate
- Schloss Reichenstein, a water castle in Inzlingen, Baden-Wüttemberg, Germany

== People with the surname ==
- Franz-Joseph Müller von Reichenstein (c. 1741 – c. 1825 or 1826), Austrian mineralogist
- William Reichenstein (born 1947), British sprint canoer

== See also ==
- Reichensteiner, a white wine grape
