= Admonter Reichenstein =

Mountain in the Ennstal Alps, Austria

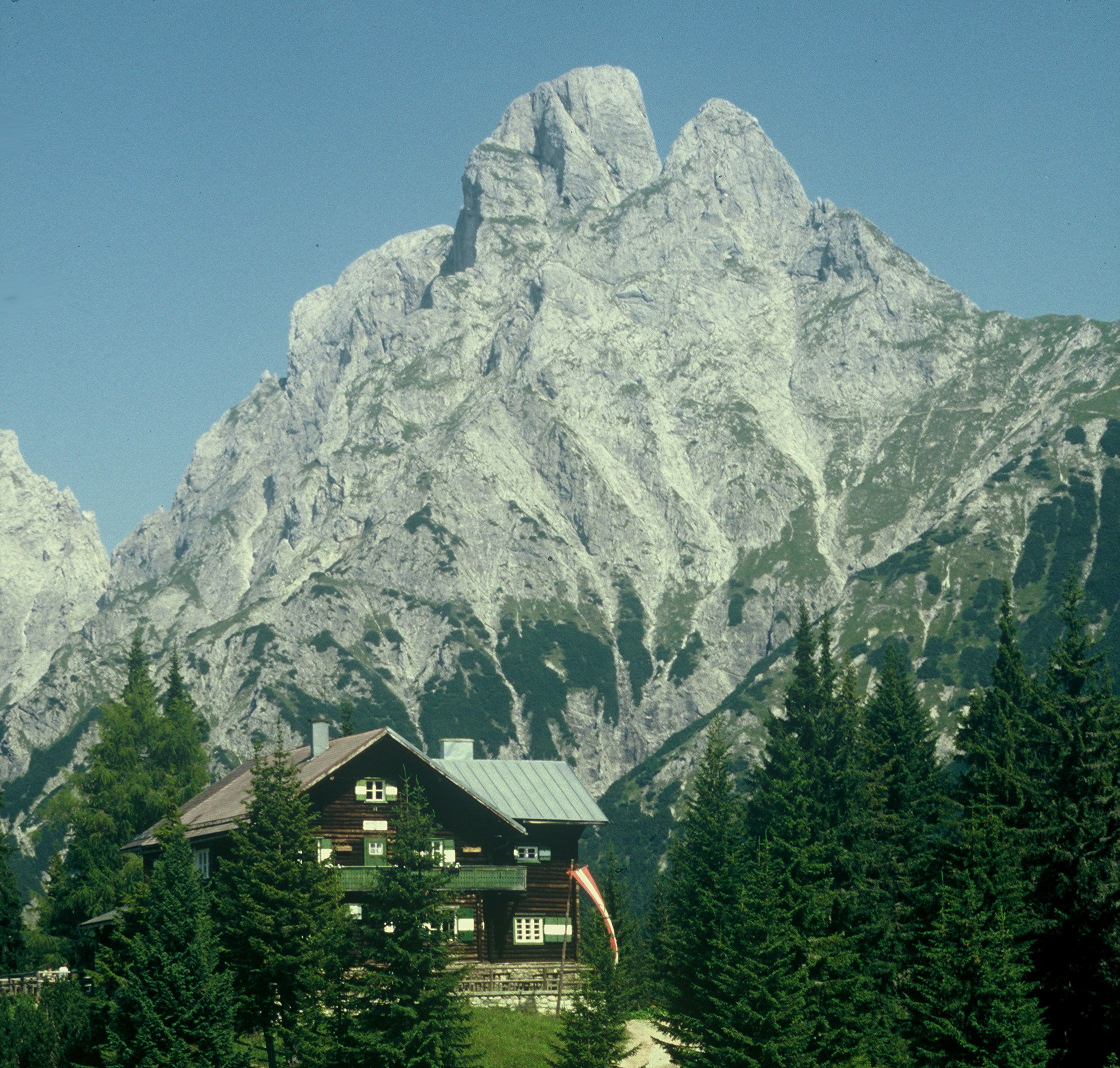
- View from the southeast of the Admonter Reichenstein. Right of the main summit is the Totenköpfl. In the foreground is the Mödlinger Hut.

Highest point
- Elevation: 2,251 m (AA) (7,385 ft)
- Coordinates: 47°32′57″N 14°32′36″E

Geography
- Location within Austria
- Location: Gesäuse, Styria, Austria
- Parent range: Ennstal Alps

Geology
- Rock age(s): Triassic, Norian
- Mountain type: rock summit
- Rock type: Dachstein corallian limestone

Climbing
- First ascent: on 23 July 1873 by Johannes Frischauf, F. v. Juraschek with M. Spreitz
- Normal route: From the Mödlinger Hut through the South Ravine (Südschlucht)

The Admonter Reichenstein is a mountain in the Ennstal Alps and the highest and easternmost peak in the Reichenstein Group. An ascent of the mountain requires climbing ability sufficient to handle UIAA grade II climbs.

== Topography ==
The Admonter Reichenstein has three summits. From west to east these are: the Admonter Horn 2,184 m, the Reichenstein main summit 2,251 m above sea level (AA) and the Totenköpfl 2,178 m. The Admonter Horn is separated from the main summit by the Reichenstein Saddle (Reichensteinsattel, 2,170 m). The Totenköpfl is separated from the main summit by the notch of the Reichensteinscharte 2,100 m. The mountain is surrounded on all sides by steep rock faces and drops. The Reichenstein is separated from the Sparafeld in the west by the wind gap of the Wildscharte 1,903 m.

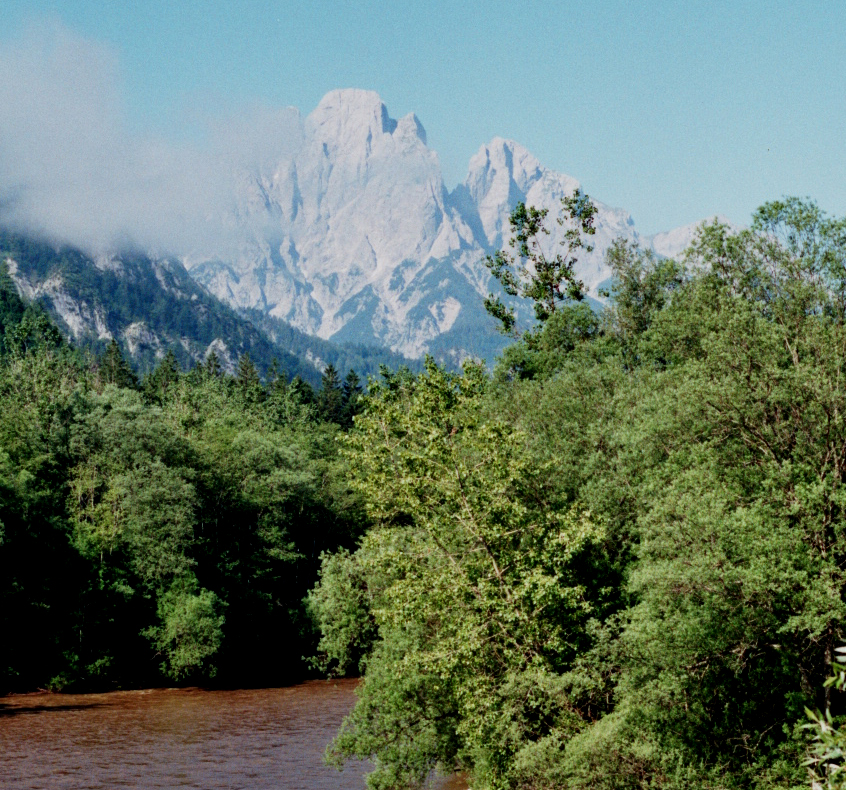
The Admonter Reichenstein with the Totenköpfl, Reichenstein main summit and Admonter Horn from the bridge over the Enns near Gstatterboden. Right of the Reichenstein: the Sparafeld.

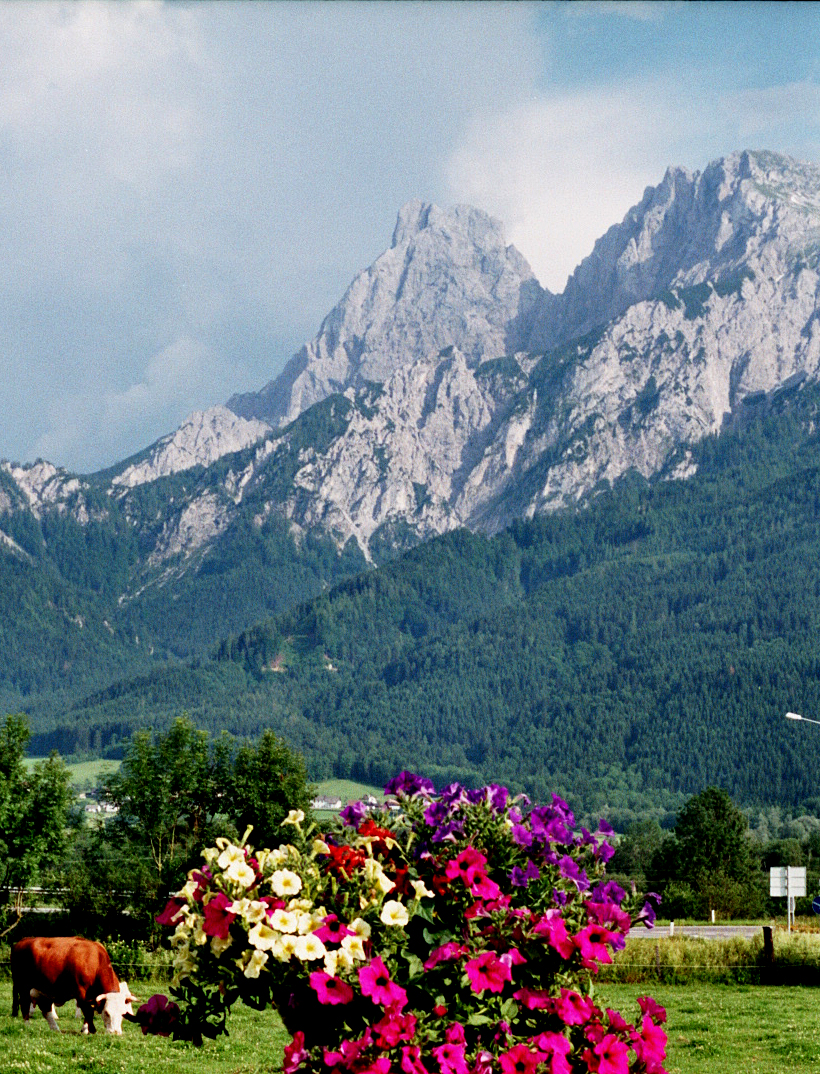
View from Weng towards the south to the Admonter Reichenstein (left) and Sparafeld (right)

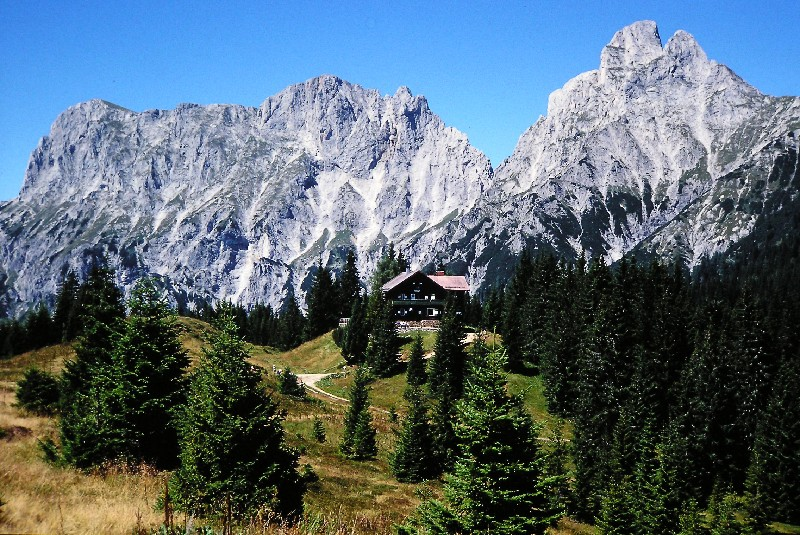
View from SE of the Reichenstein Group. Right: the Admonter Reichenstein, right of the main summit: the Totenköpfl, left of the Reichenstein: the Sparafeld, and far left: the Kalbling. In the foreground is the Mödlinger Hut.

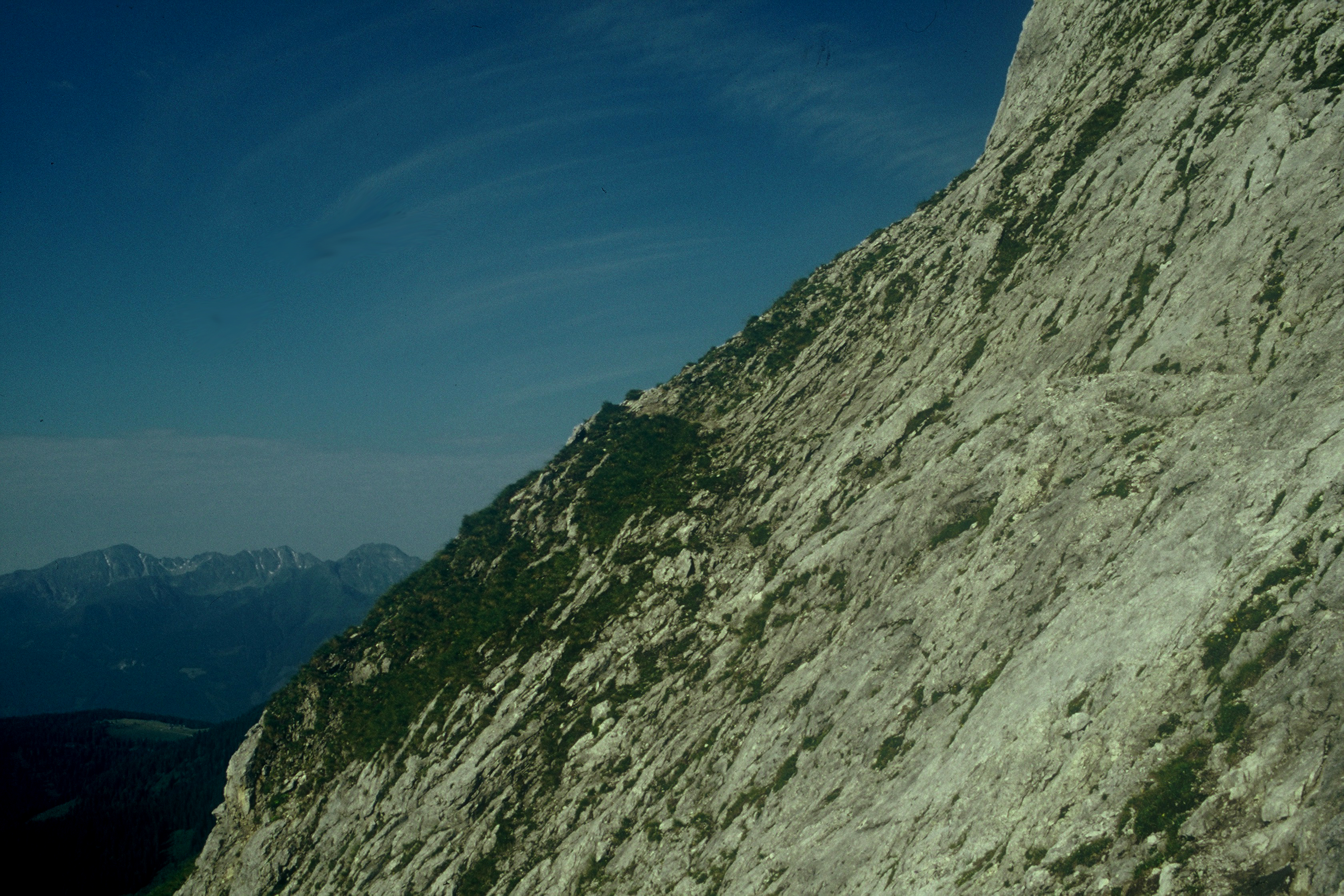
The Herzmann Kupfer Platte. Crossing this slab is one of the key points of the normal route.
