= Otto Barth =

Otto Barth may refer to:

- Otto Barth (artist) (1876–1916), Austrian artist
- Otto Barth (general) (1891–1963), German general in the Wehrmacht during World War II
