= Carloman =

Carloman (German: Karlmann) may refer to:

- Carloman (fl. late 6th century), father of Pepin of Landen
- Carloman (mayor of the palace) (ruled 741–47)
- Carloman I, king of the Franks (768–71)
- Carloman, birth name of Pepin of Italy (781–810)
- Carloman, son of Charles the Bald (died 876)
- Carloman of Bavaria (ruled 876–80)
- Carloman II, king of the Franks (879–84)

== See also ==
- Carlmann Kolb
- Claes-Göran Carlman
- Karlmann Geiß
- Kaliman I of Bulgaria (ruled 1241–46)
- Kaliman II of Bulgaria (ruled 1256–57)
