= Hans Kronberger (politician) =

Austrian politician (1951–2018)

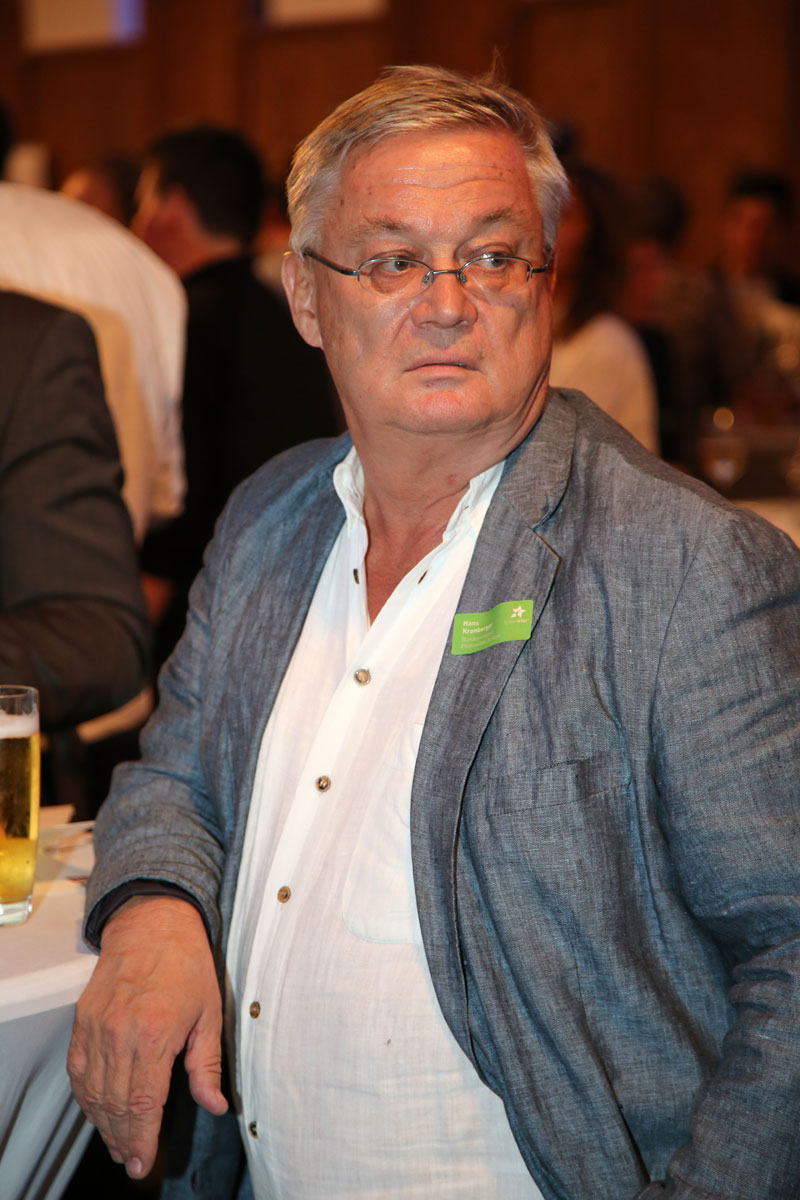

Member of European Parliament
- In office 11 November 1996 – 19 July 2004

Personal details
- Born: 8 August 1943 Hall bei Admont, Styria, Germany
- Died: 13 July 2018 (aged 74) Vienna, Austria
- Party: Austria; Freedom Party of Austria; European Union; Alliance of Liberals and Democrats for Europe

Hans Kronberger (9 May 1951 – 14 July 2018) was an Austrian politician who was Member of the European Parliament. He was a parliamentary member of the Freedom Party of Austria, although was officially considered non-attached. After his unsuccessful candidacy in the 2004 European Parliament election, Kronberger contested his fellow Freedom Party of Austria member, Andreas Mölzer's election in the Constitutional Court of Austria.

Hans Kronberger was born on 9 May 1951 at Hall bei Admont, Austria. Kronberger was first elected to the European Parliament on 11 November 1996. Prior to his election to the European Parliament, Kronberger had worked as a television journalist, and had become well known as an expert in environmental policy. During his time as a Member of the European Parliament, Kronberger sat on the Committee on the Environment, Public Health and Consumer Protection, the Delegation to the EU-Poland Joint Parliamentary Committee, the Delegation to the EU-Slovak Republic Joint Parliamentary Committee and the Delegation to the EU-Russia Parliamentary Cooperation Committee. He also served as a substitute on the Committee on Agriculture and Rural Development, the Committee on Transport and Tourism, the Committee on Culture, Youth, Education and the Media and the Committee on Employment and Social Affairs.

Although Kronberger was re-elected on 20 July 1999, he was not re-elected during the 2004 election due to the flow of preference votes being directed towards the other Freedom Party of Austria candidate, Andreas Mölzer. Kronberger challenged the result in the Constitutional Court of Austria, but his claim was rejected as he did not file his dispute within the time limit for the contesting of election results.
