= Erzbach (Enns) =

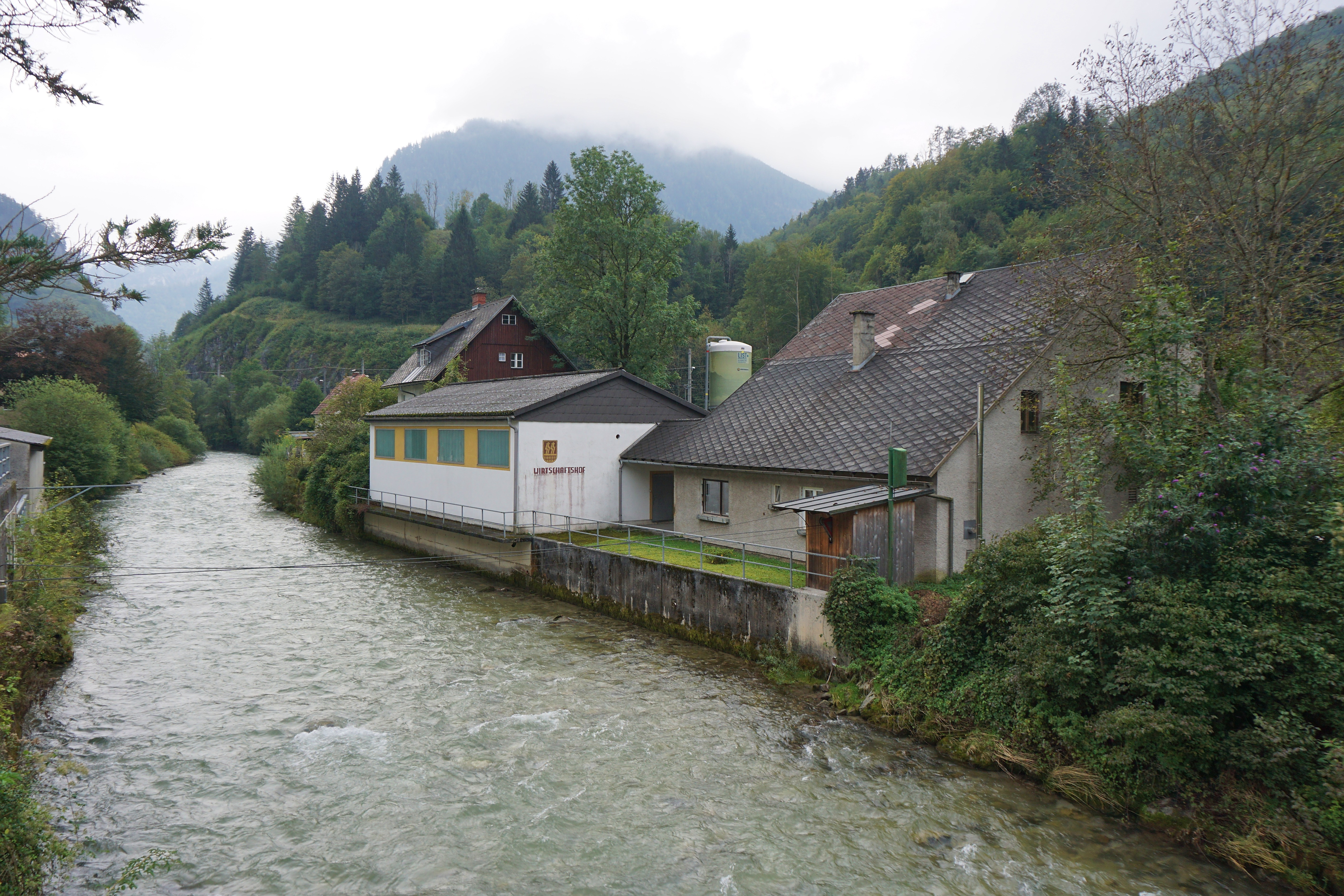

Location
- Country: Austria
- State: Styria

Physical characteristics
- Mouth
  - location: Enns
  - coordinates: 47.6080°N 14.7427°E
- Basin size: 256 km^{2} (99 sq mi)

Basin features
- Progression: Enns→ Danube→ Black Sea

Erzbach is a river of the state Styria in Austria. It is a right tributary of the Enns at Hieflau. Its drainage basin is 256 km^{2} (99 sq mi).
