= Carlmann Kolb =

German priest, organist, and composer

Carlmann Kolb (29 January 1703 – 15 January 1765) was a German priest, organist, and composer.

He was born in Kösslarn, Griesbach, Lower Bavaria, and educated in Asbach and Landshut. He was ordained a priest in 1729 at the Benedictine Asbach Abbey, and was also appointed organist there. He acted as tutor to the family of the Count of Tattenbach-Reinstein in Munich, and received his patronage. He died in Munich.

His known works are the Sinfonia in F major for harpsichord and strings, which is lost, and the Certamen aonium (Augsburg, 1733), composed of a prelude, three verses in the form of short fughettas and a cadenza on each of the church modes. The style shows influence by Franz Xaver Murschhauser and Gottlieb Muffat. Modern editions have been published in Altötting, 1959, ed. R. Walter, and Heidelberg, 1960.

== Sources ==
- Hugh J. McLean, "Kolb, Carlmann", Grove Music Online ed. L. Macy (Accessed 2007-06-10)
