= Gesäuse National Park =

Austrian national park

- IUCN category II (national park)
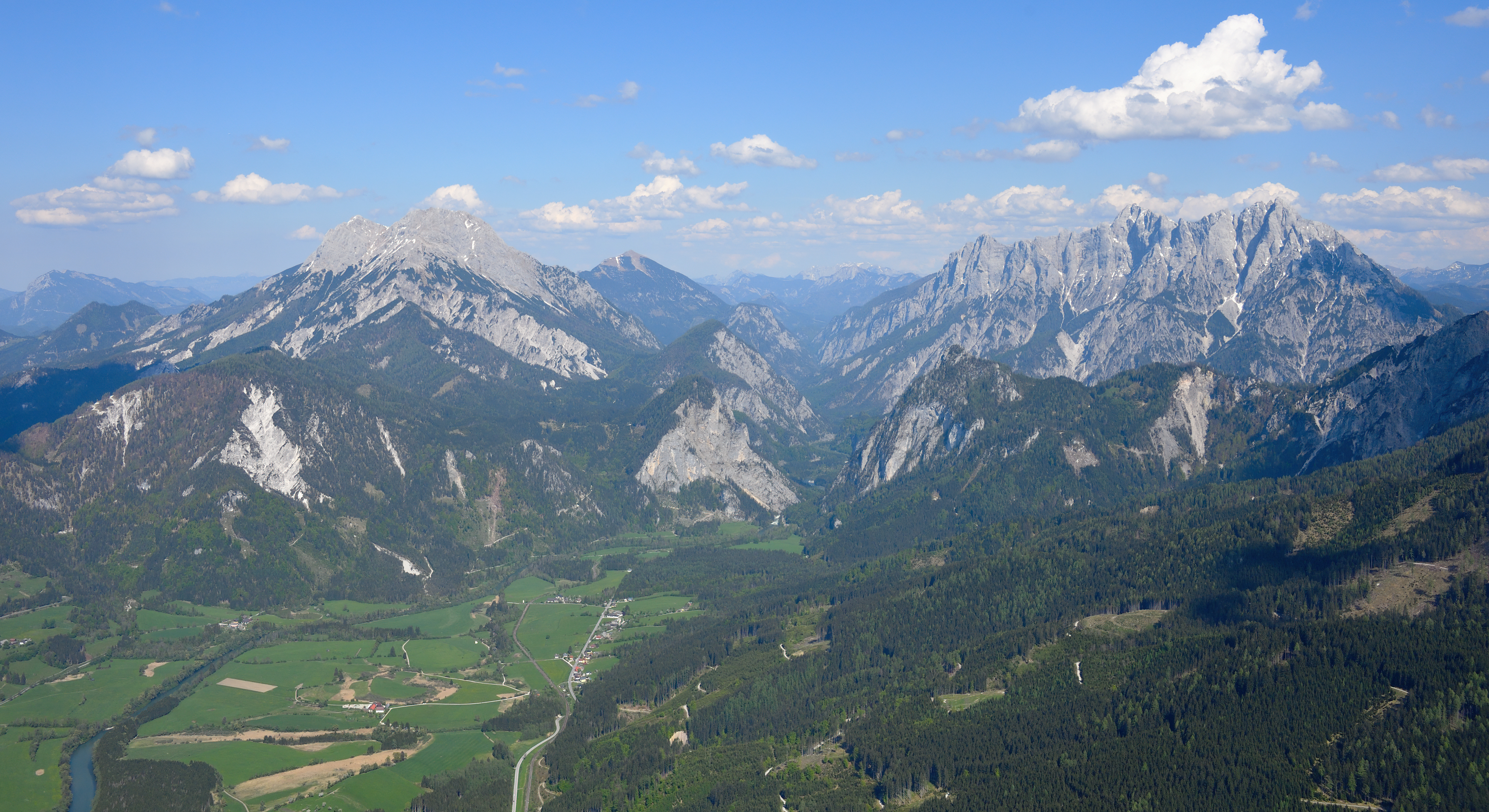
- Aerial view from the west

- Location within Austria
- Location: Styria, Austria
- Nearest city: Graz
- Coordinates: 47°36′0″N 14°45′0″E
- Area: 110 km^{2} (42 sq mi)
- Established: 26 October 2002

Gesäuse National Park is a national park in the Austrian state of Styria. Located in the mountainous Upper Styrian region, it covers large parts of the Gesäuse range within the Ennstal Alps and the steep water gap of the Enns river between Admont and Hieflau. The area also covers parts of the municipal areas of Johnsbach, Weng, Landl, and Sankt Gallen.

The national park currently covers 110 km^{2} (42 sq mi), with another 15 km^{2} (5.8 sq mi) planned. It was established on 26 October 2002.

The highest mountain is Hochtor at 2,369 metres (7,772 ft).
