= Enns (river) =

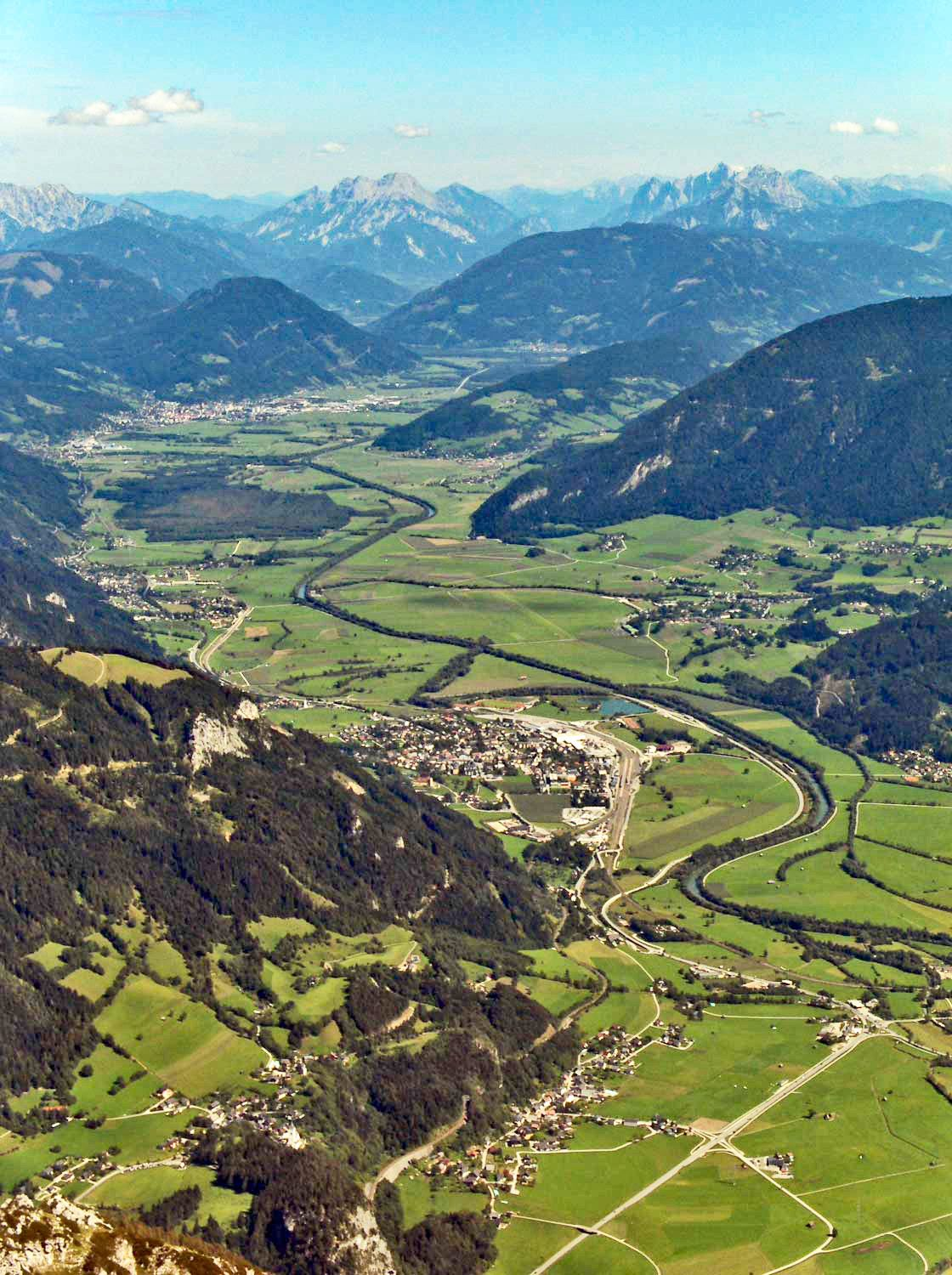
- The Ennstal in Styria between Stainach and Liezen

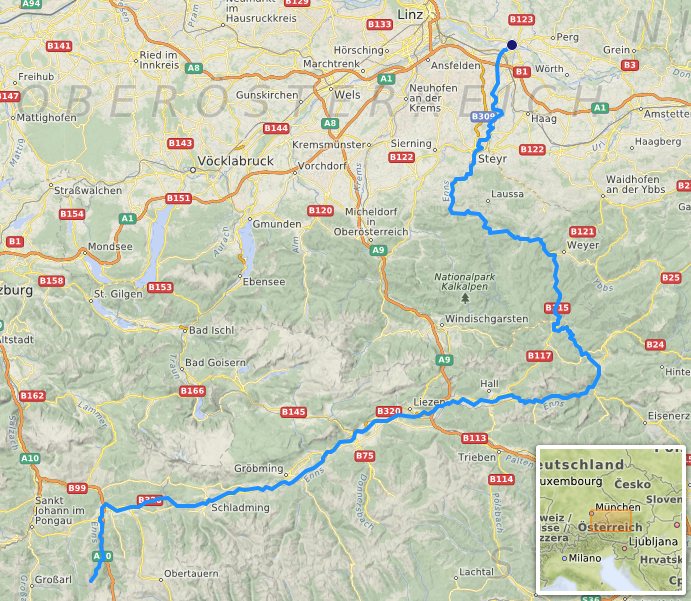
- Etymology: Latin Anisus, Anasus

Location
- Country: Austria

Physical characteristics
- Source
  - location: Radstädter Tauern (mountains)
- Mouth
  - location: Danube at Mauthausen
  - coordinates: 48.2369°N 14.5190°E
- Length: 253.4 km (157.5 mi)
- Basin size: 6,084 km^{2} (2,349 sq mi)
- Discharge
  - location: mouth
  - average: 200 m^{3}/s (7,100 cu ft/s)

Basin features
- Progression: Danube→ Black Sea

The Enns (German pronunciation: [ɛns]) is a southern tributary of the river Danube in Austria, joining northward at the city of Enns. It forms parts of the border between the states of Lower Austria and Upper Austria. The Enns spans 253 kilometres (157 mi), in a flat-J-shape. It flows from its source near the village Flachau, generally eastward through Radstadt, Schladming, and Liezen, then turns north near Hieflau, to flow past Weyer and Ternberg through Steyr, and further north to the Danube at Enns (see map in References).

== Name ==
It was known in Latin as Anisus or Anasus, of uncertain origin; Anreiter et al. tried to link it to an Indo-European *on- and the hydronymic suffix *-is-. Later sources call it Ensa or Enisa. Others have linked it to Upper Danubian Vasconic *an, "water." Another possible link is Greek ᾰ̓νῠστός (anystos, "useful"). The West Slavic languages have different names for the river: in Czech it is called the Enže; in Slovak, the Enža; and in Polish, the Aniza.

== Geography ==
The Enns has its source in the Radstädter Tauern mountains in the Austrian state of Salzburg. It flows though an ancient valley (Ennstal) which developed along the structural axis of the Alps (thus an intramontane trough, extending from the Inn and Salzach), and was enlarged during the ice age. It follows the border between the Northern Limestone Alps and the Central Eastern Alps on an eastern trajectory through Styria, where it passes the Dachstein group at its southern side. Between Admont and Hieflau, it takes a turn to the North and passes through the Gesäuse, a gorge of a length of 15 km (9.3 mi), where it penetrates the limestone of the Ennstaler Alpen. Flowing to the north from there on, it reaches the state of Upper Austria at the mouth of the Laussabach. North of Steyr, it forms the border between Upper Austria and Lower Austria (formerly also known as Austria above the Enns and Austria below the Enns). Finally, it meets the Danube at Mauthausen and the city of Enns. It is the longest river solely in Austria.

The Enns is a typical wild water river and draws its water from an area of 6,084 km^{2} (2,349 sq mi), which makes it the fifth-largest in Austria. Its average discharge at the mouth is 200 m^{3}/s (7,100 cu ft/s).

The Anisian Age in the Triassic Period of geological time is named from Anisus, the Latin name of the river Enns.

== History ==
During the Diocletianic Persecution of Christians, Saint Florian was drowned in the river by Roman soldiers for refusing to make a sacrifice to the Roman gods in accordance with Roman religion.

In the middle of the 19th century, canals began to be built along the 70 km (43 mi) between Weißenbach and the Gesäuse, in order to make use of the water for agriculture and forestry.

In total, ten power plants with a total generative power of 345 megawatts have been built by the Ennskraftwerke AG.

== Towns along the river ==
=== in Salzburg ===
- Radstadt

=== in Styria ===
- Schladming
- Gröbming
- Liezen
- Selzthal
- Admont

=== in Upper Austria ===
- Großraming
- Ternberg
- Garsten
- Steyr
- Enns

== Hydroelectric power stations ==
Currently, there are 15 hydroelectric power stations on the Enns. The power stations are listed beginning at the headwaters:

Dam	Nameplate capacity (MW)	Annual generation (Mio. kwh)
Gstatterboden	2	6.8
Hieflau	63	388
Landl	25	135.5
Krippau	30	173.5
Altenmarkt	26	165.9
Schönau	30	122.8
Weyer	37	159.6
Großraming	72	270.7
Losenstein	39	170
Ternberg	40	169.7
Rosenau	34	145.5
Garsten-St. Ulrich	38	162.5
Staning	43	203.2
Mühlrading	25	111.8
St. Pantaleon	52	261.6

== Tributaries ==
The most important inflows are the Palten, the Salza and the Steyr. Other tributaries are the Northern Taurach and the Erzbach.

== Transport ==
A major transit route connecting Germany and Slovenia through Austria runs through the Enns valley. The so-called Eisenstraße ("iron road") runs along the river between Hieflau and Enns, along which iron ore has been transported from the Styrian Erzberg ("ore mountain") to the steel mill in Linz. The 263 km Enns Radweg cyclepath follows the river starting at Flachauwinkl and finishing where the Enns enters the Danube.
