= Garsten-St. Ulrich Hydroelectric Power Station =

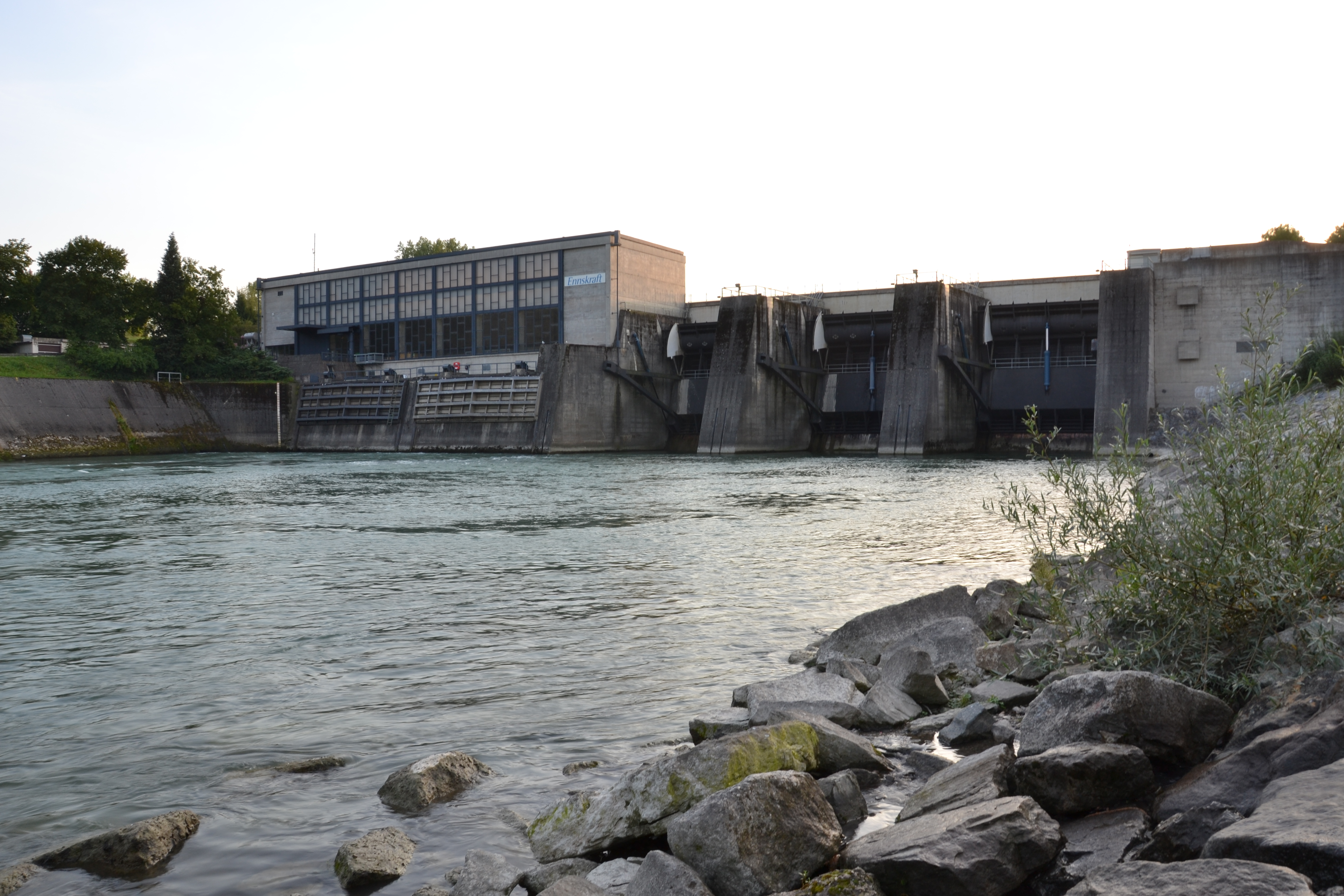

- Location within Austria
- Official name: Kraftwerk Garsten-St. Ulrich
- Location: Garsten, Upper Austria, Austria
- Coordinates: 48.018248°N 14.411740°E
- Purpose: Power
- Status: Operational
- Construction began: 1965
- Opening date: 1967
- Owner: Ennskraftwerke AG
- Operator: Ennskraftwerke AG

Dam and spillways
- Type of dam: Concrete gravity dam
- Impounds: Enns
- Spillway type: Over the dam

Power Station
- Commission date: 1967
- Hydraulic head: 13.3 m
- Turbines: Kaplan turbines 2 × 15.5 MW, 1 × 1.943 MW
- Installed capacity: 35.3 MW
- Annual generation: 157 GWh

Garsten-St. Ulrich Hydroelectric Power Station (German: Kraftwerk Garsten-St. Ulrich) is a run-of-the-river hydroelectric power station on the Enns. It is located in Garsten municipality, state of Upper Austria, Austria.

Construction of the power station began in 1965. It was operational in 1967. Garsten-St. Ulrich is owned and operated by Ennskraftwerke AG.

== Dam ==
Garsten-St. Ulrich dam consists of a weir with 3 sluice gates on the left side and a machine hall (length 50 m, width 48,2 m, height 36,5 m) on the right side.

== Reservoir ==
The dam creates a small reservoir.

== Power station ==
The power station contains 3 Kaplan turbine-generators, two with 15.5 MW each and one with 1.943 MW. The total nameplate capacity is 35.3 MW. Its average annual generation is 157 GWh. The turbines were provided by Andritz and Escher Wyss; the generators by ELIN and Wiener Starkstromwerke.

The maximum hydraulic head is 13.3 m. The maximum flow for all turbines is 286 m³/s.
