= Großer Pyhrgas =

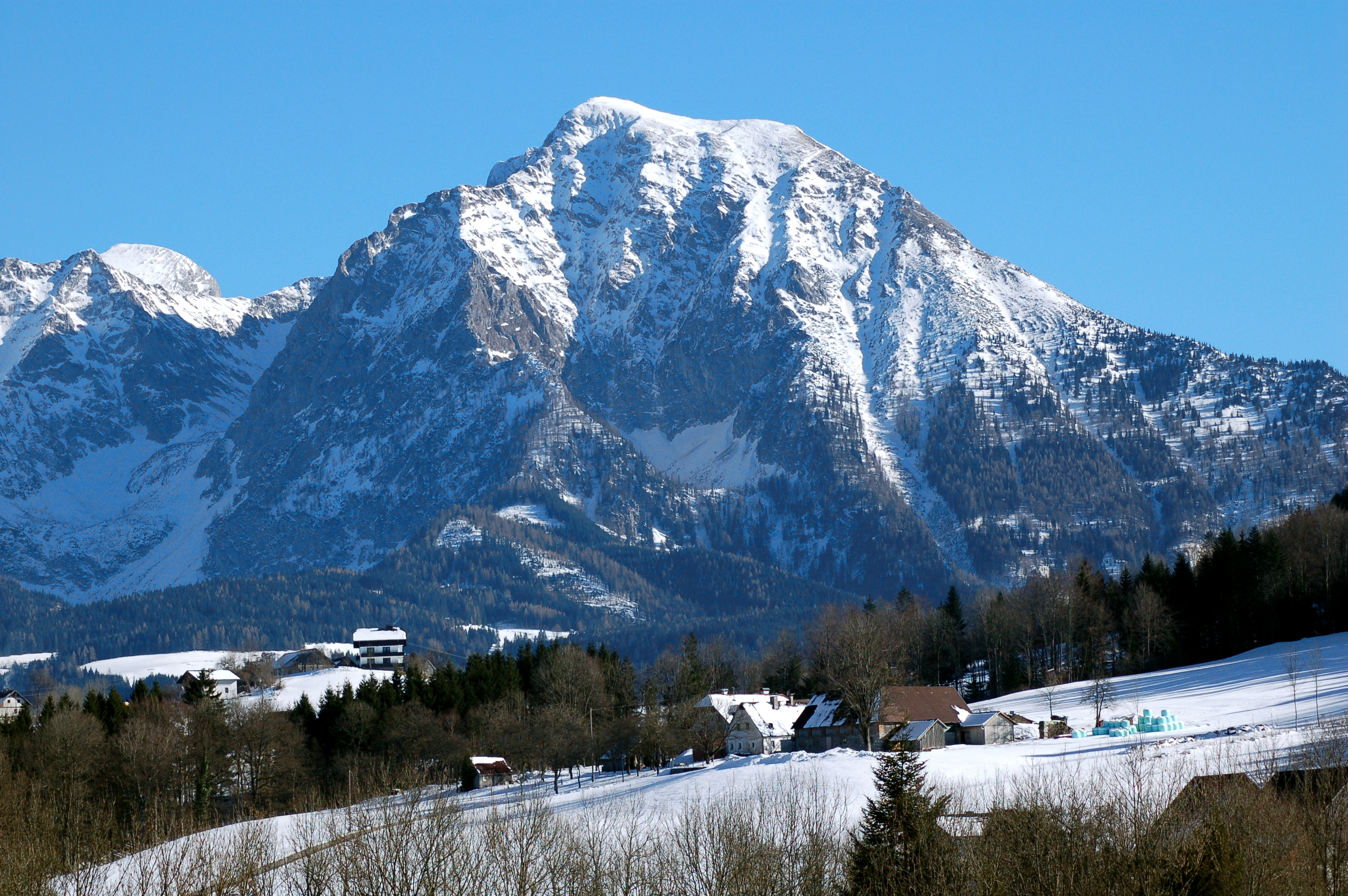
- Großer Pyhrgas

Highest point
- Elevation: 2,244 m (7,362 ft)
- Prominence: 1,290 m (4,230 ft)
- Listing: Highest peak in the Haller Mauern
- Coordinates: 47°39′11″N 14°23′54″E

Geography
- Location within Austria
- Location: Upper Austria / Styria, Austria
- Parent range: Haller Mauern, Ennstal Alps

Climbing
- Easiest route: Hiking trail

The Großer Pyhrgas is a mountain in the Ennstal Alps on the border between Upper Austria and Styria. At a height of 2,244 m above sea level (AA) it is the highest summit and western buttress of the Haller Mauern range.

Alpine huts on the Großer Pyhrgas are, on the Upper Austrian side, the Hofalm Hut (1,305 m), the Rohrauerhaus (1,308 m) and the Bosruck Hut (1,036 m).

== Sources ==
- Gerald Radinger: Wandererlebnis Kalkalpen. Die 50 schönsten Touren im Nationalpark. Residenz Verlag, 2009, ISBN 3-7017-3133-0
