= Otto Barth (artist) =

Austrian artist (1876–1916)

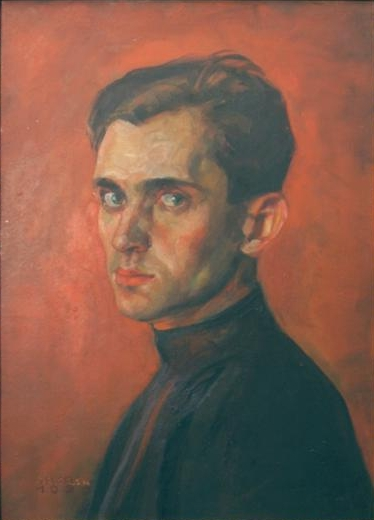
Self-portrait

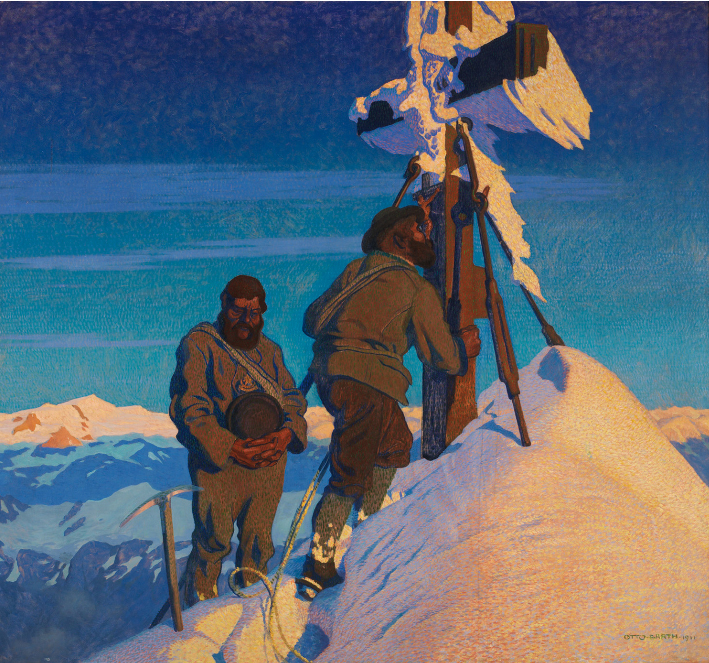
Morning prayer of the Mountain Guides on the Großglockner

Otto Barth (3 October 1876 – 9 August 1916) was an Austrian painter, graphic artist and mountaineer.

== Biography ==
He was born in Vienna. His father was an ornamental gardener. As a child, he was weak and sickly and worked to strengthen himself through mountain climbing. After showing some talent for sketching, he attended a drawing school and later enrolled at the Academy of Fine Arts.

He was close friends with the painter, Gustav Jahn, who was also an enthusiastic mountaineer. They went on several expeditions together, some of which were first ascents. The two seemed to be a mismatched pair, as Jahn was always in a good mood, whereas Barth was generally gloomy and dissatisfied with his work.

He was a member of the Hagenbund and co-founded an artists' group known as "Phalanx". He also received several commissions for paintings in public buildings, such as the new wing of the Salzburg Hauptbahnhof and a new hotel in Baden.

Although aged only 39, he began to suffer from coronary problems. After some extensive investigation, it was determined that he was probably being poisoned by lead vapors, emanating from the paints in his studio, where he generally slept. He continued to deteriorate and died in 1916 in Waidhofen. His friend, Jahn, died in a climbing-related accident three years later.

== Sources ==
- Gustav Schmidt: Nachruf zum Tode Otto Barths in the Österreichische Alpenzeitung (Österreichischer Alpenklub) from 5 Oktober 1916 Online
- Hanns Barth: Der Alpenmaler Otto Barth, Zeitschrift des Deutschen und Österreichischen Alpenvereins, Verlag d. D. Ö. A. Bruckmann, Munich 1931
