= Reifenstein =

Reifenstein may refer to:

- Reifenstein Abbey, a Cistercian abbey near the present village of Kleinbartloff, Germany
- Reifenstein Castle, a castle in Freienfeld, northern Italy
- Burgruine Reifenstein, a castle in Styria, Austria
- Reifenstein syndrome or partial androgen insensitivity syndrome, a condition that results in the partial inability of the cell to respond to androgens.
