= Reiffenstein =

Reiffenstein is a surname. Notable people with the surname include:

- Carl Theodor Reiffenstein (1820–1893), German landscape and architecture painter
- George Reiffenstein (1883–1932), Canadian rower
- Johann Friedrich Reiffenstein (1719–1793), German cicerone for grand tourists, painter, antiquarian and agent for art collectors in Rome
