= Weng im Gesäuse =

- Former municipality
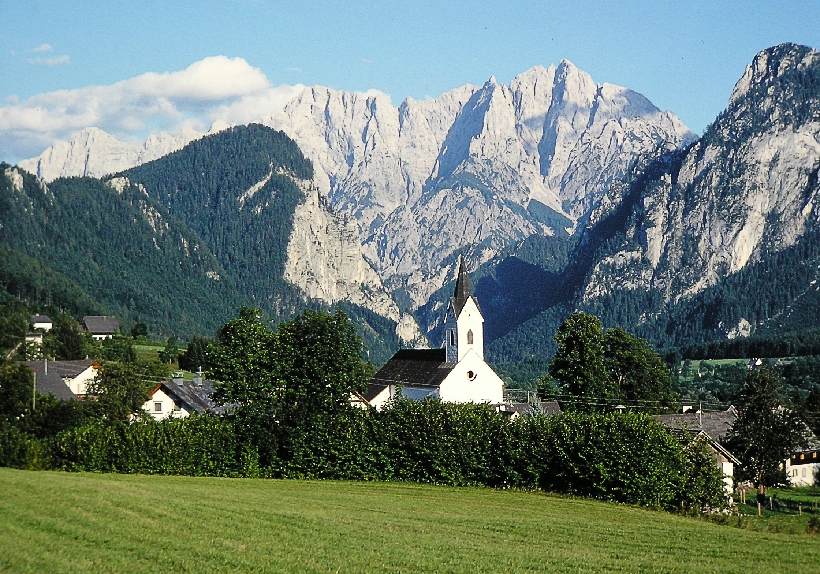

- Location within Austria
- Coordinates: 47°35′57″N 14°30′10″E
- Country: Austria
- State: Styria
- District: Liezen

Area
  - Total: 75.63 km^{2} (29.20 sq mi)
- Elevation: 608 m (1,995 ft)

Population (1 January 2016)
  - Total: 586
  - Density: 7.75/km^{2} (20.1/sq mi)
- Time zone: UTC+1 (CET)
  - Summer (DST): UTC+2 (CEST)
- Postal code: 8913
- Area code: 03613
- Vehicle registration: LI
- Website: www.weng.at

Weng im Gesäuse is a former municipality in the district of Liezen in the Austrian state of Styria. Since the 2015 Styria municipal structural reform, it is part of the municipality Admont.

== Geography ==
Weng im Gesäuse lies in the eastern Admont basin in the Gesäuse National Park.
