= Haller Mauern =

Coordinates: 47.6500°N 14.4500°E

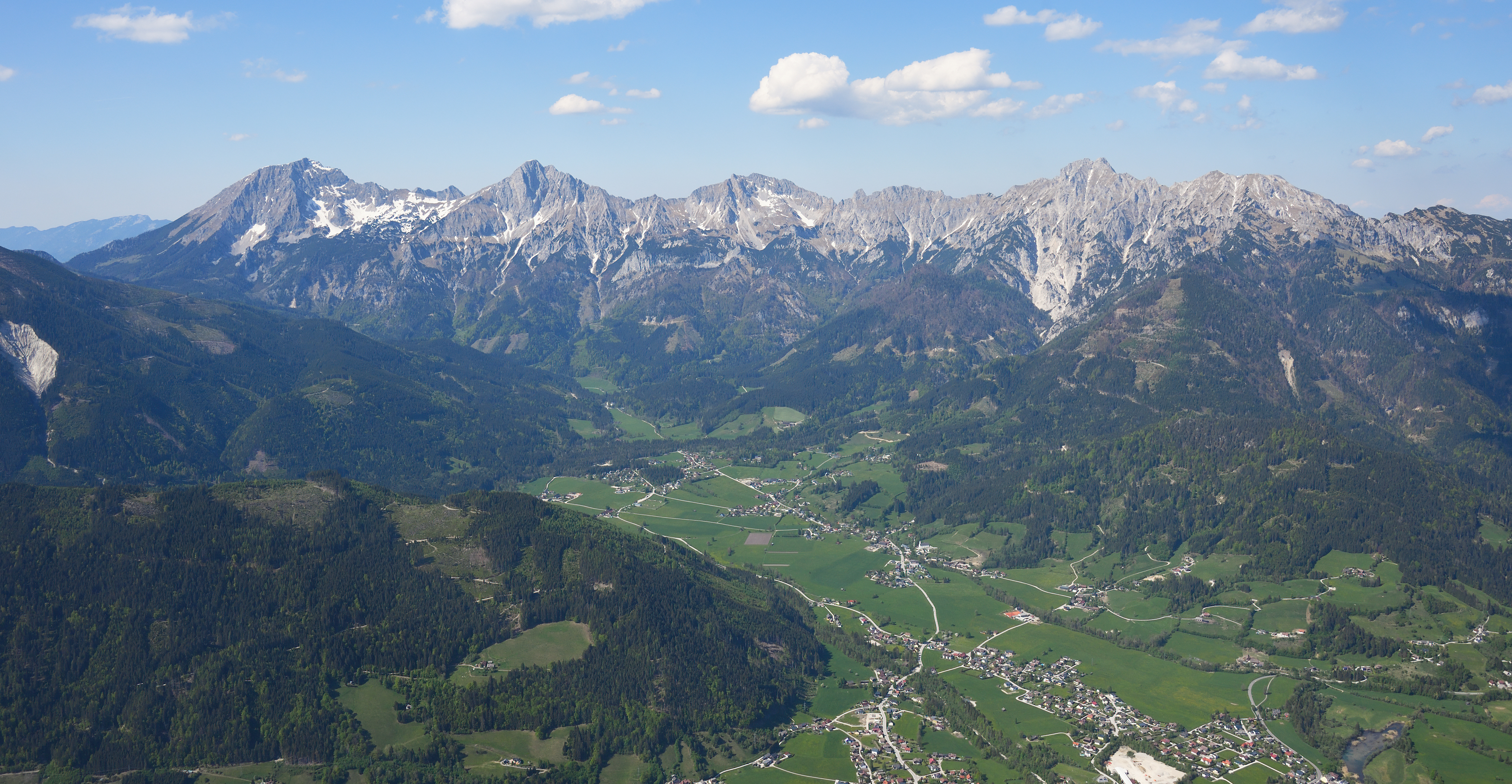
Aerial view from the south

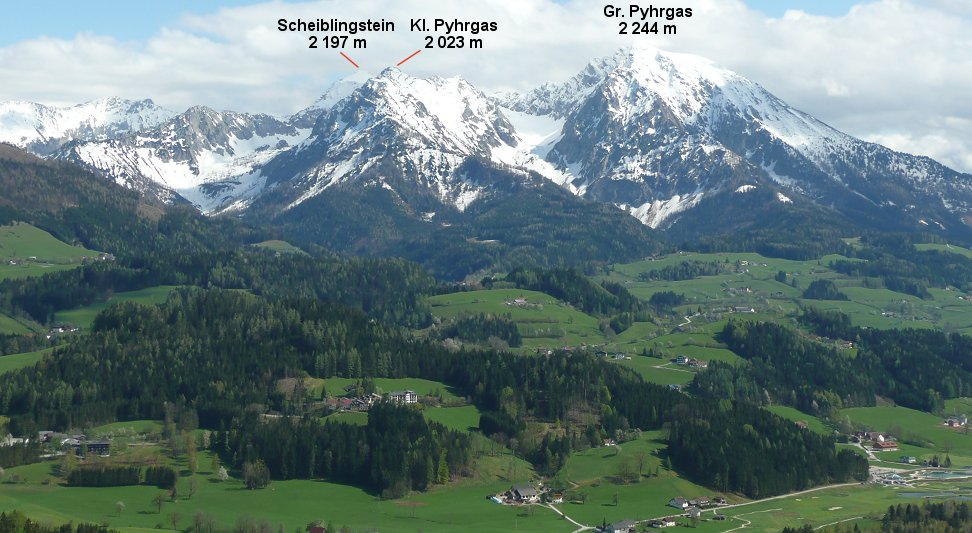
View from the Wurbauerkogel in Windischgarsten of the Haller Mauern

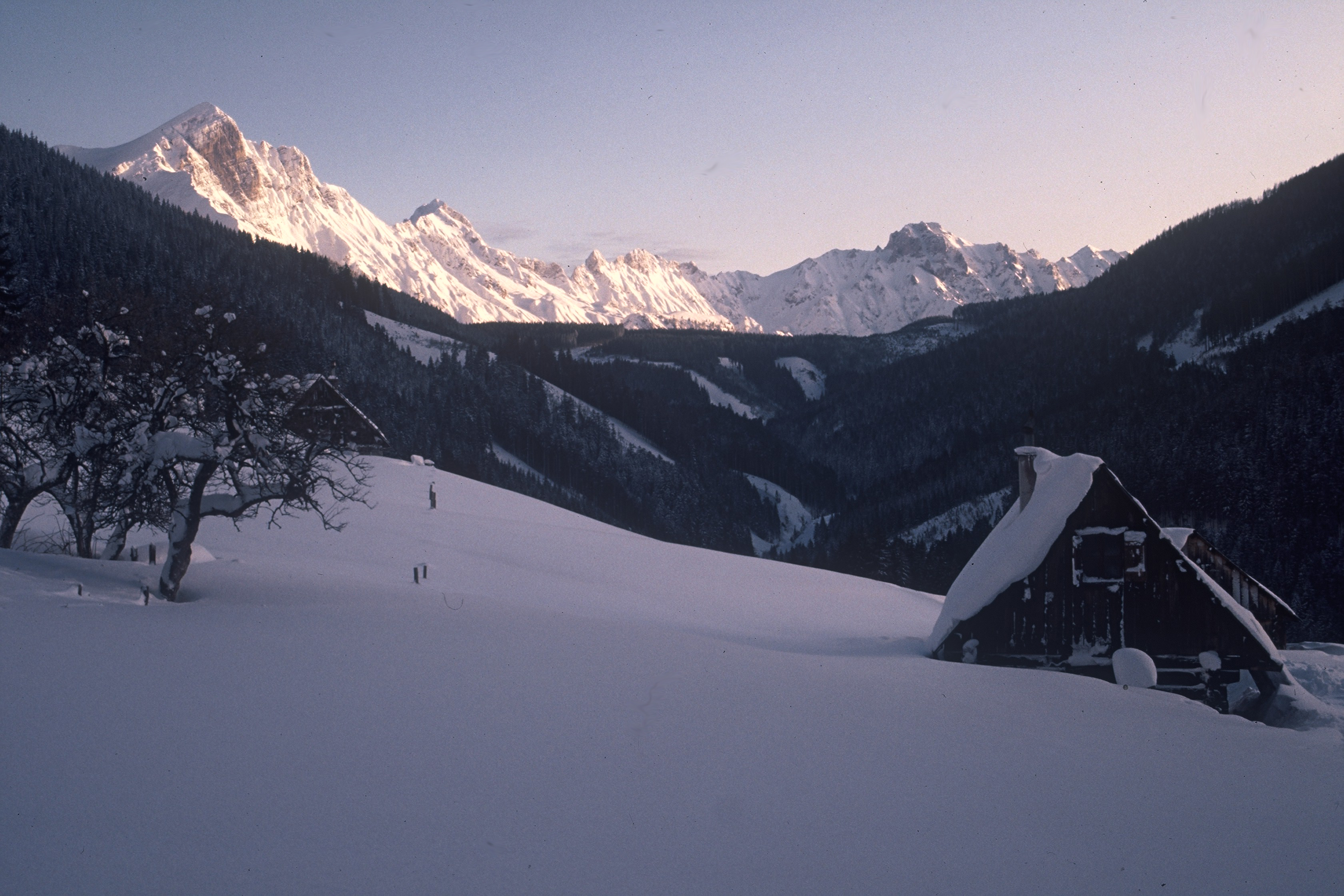
View from the Ardningalm looking northeast towards the Haller Mauern from Scheiblingstein (left) to the Natterriegl (right)

The Haller Mauern is a small mountain chain, part of the larger Northern Limestone Alps.

The western buttress of the main ridge is formed by the 2,244 m high Großer Pyhrgas. This mountain is also the highest peak in the Haller Mauern. Its summit offers fine views and may be relatively easily climbed on the so-called normal route, although sure-footedness is required.

== Sources ==
- Günter und Luise Auferbauer: Gesäuse mit Eisenerzer Alpen. Wanderführer, Bergverlag Rother, Ottobrunn 2001, ISBN 3-7633-4213-3.
- Willi End: Gesäuseberge - Ennstaler Alpen. Alpenvereinsführer, Berverlag Rother, Ottobrunn 1988, ISBN 3-7633-1248-X.
- Ernst Kren: Gesäuse. Steirische Verlagsgesellschaft, Graz 2002, ISBN 3-85489-081-8.
- Gerald Radinger: Wandererlebnis Kalkalpen, Die 50 schönsten Touren im Nationalpark. Wanderführer, Residenz Verlag, St. Pölten 2009, ISBN 3-7017-3133-0.
- Hubert Walter: Gesäuse mit Admont. Gebiets- und Auswahlführer, Bergverlag Rudolf Rother, Munich, 1989, ISBN 3-7633-3248-0.
