= Johnsbach =

- Former municipality
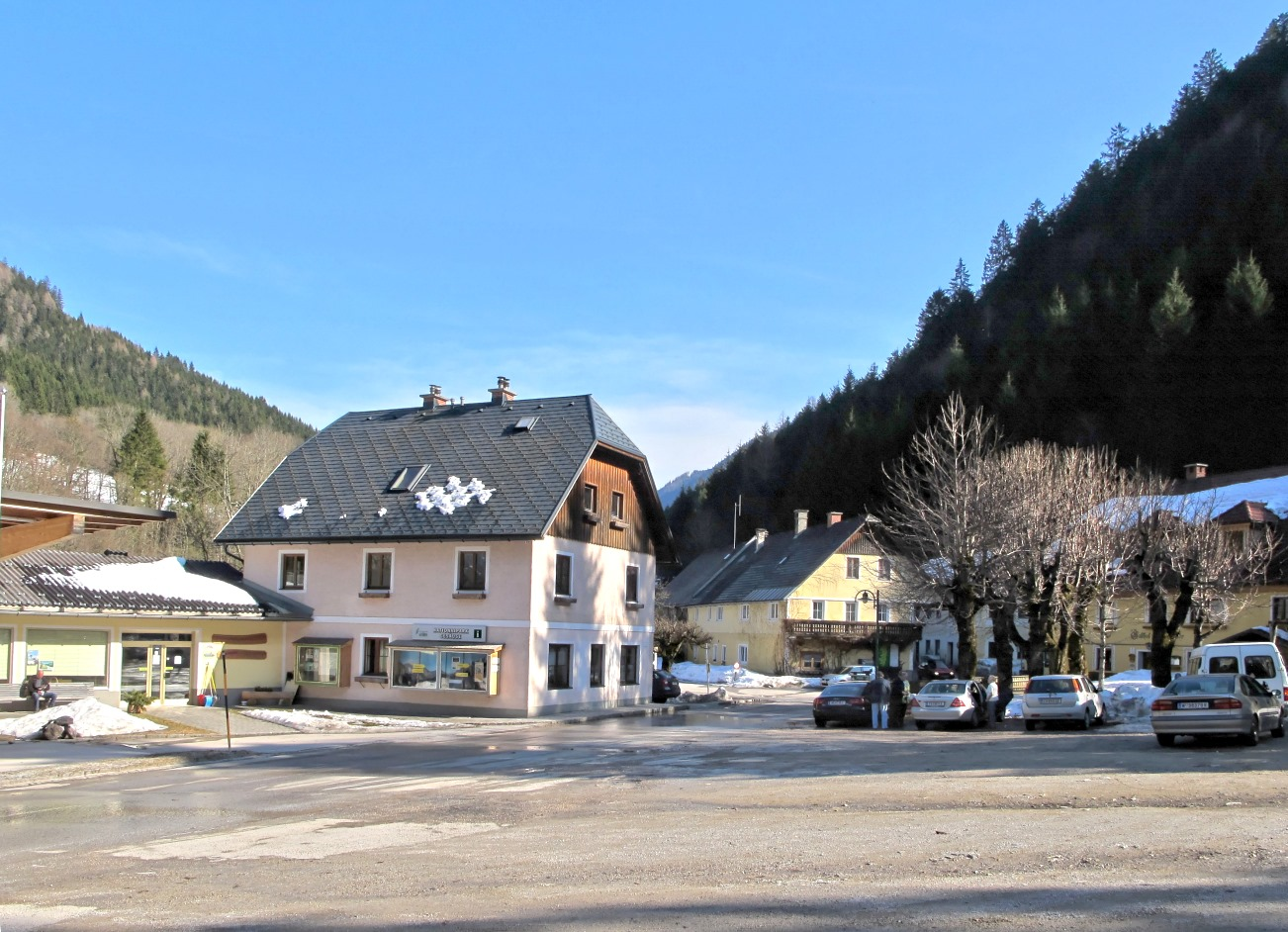
- Centre of Johnsbach

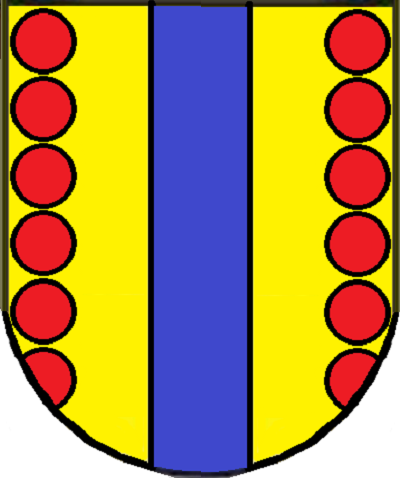
- Coat of arms

- Location within Austria
- Coordinates: 47°32′23″N 14°35′04″E
- Country: Austria
- State: Styria
- District: Liezen

Area
  - Total: 97.71 km^{2} (37.73 sq mi)
- Elevation: 853 m (2,799 ft)

Population (1 January 2016)
  - Total: 150
  - Density: 1.5/km^{2} (4.0/sq mi)
- Time zone: UTC+1 (CET)
  - Summer (DST): UTC+2 (CEST)
- Postal code: 8912
- Area code: 03611
- Vehicle registration: LI
- Website: www.johnsbach.at

Johnsbach is a former municipality in the Austrian state of Styria. Since the 2015 Styria municipal structural reform, it is part of the municipality Admont.

== Population ==
Historical population
Year	Pop.	±%
1869	269	—
1880	324	+20.4%
1890	357	+10.2%
1900	326	−8.7%
1910	293	−10.1%
1923	282	−3.8%
1934	266	−5.7%
1939	285	+7.1%
1951	279	−2.1%
1961	246	−11.8%
1971	237	−3.7%
1981	203	−14.3%
1991	188	−7.4%
2001	173	−8.0%
2011	144	−16.8%
