= Hochtor =

Mountain in the Ennstal Alps in Styria, Austria

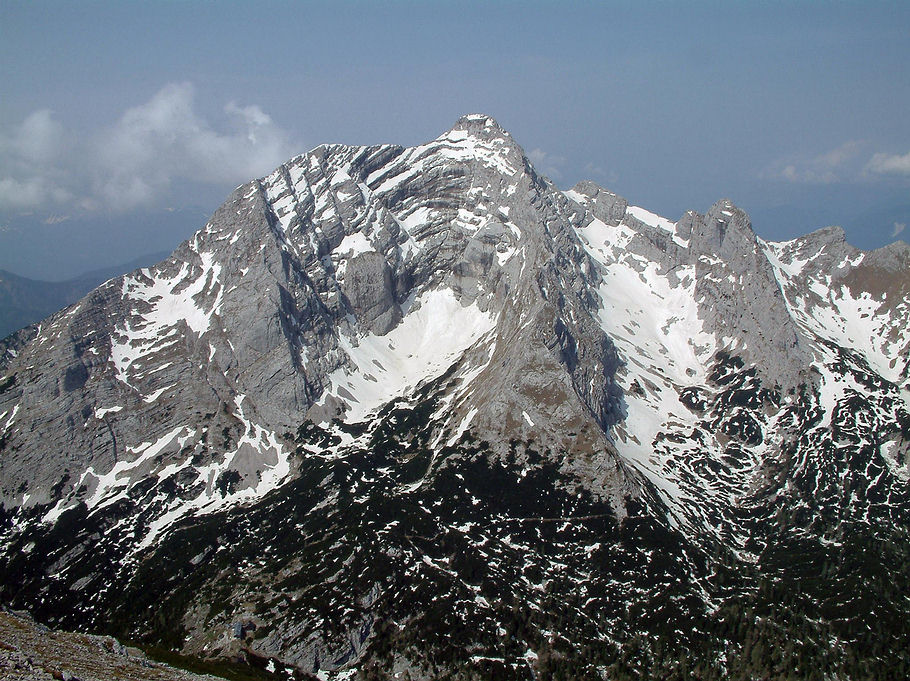
- Hochtor viewed from the east

Highest point
- Elevation: 2,369 m (7,772 ft)
- Prominence: 1,520 m (4,990 ft)
- Listing: Ultra
- Coordinates: 47°33′42″N 14°37′58″E

Geography
- Location within Alps
- Location: Styria, Austria
- Parent range: Ennstaler Alps (Northern Limestone Alps)

Hochtor, at 2,369 m (7,772 ft), is the highest mountain in the Ennstaler Alps, part of the Northern Limestone Alps, in Styria, Austria.

The mountain is protected as part of Gesäuse National Park, the third largest National Park in Austria.

== Gallery ==
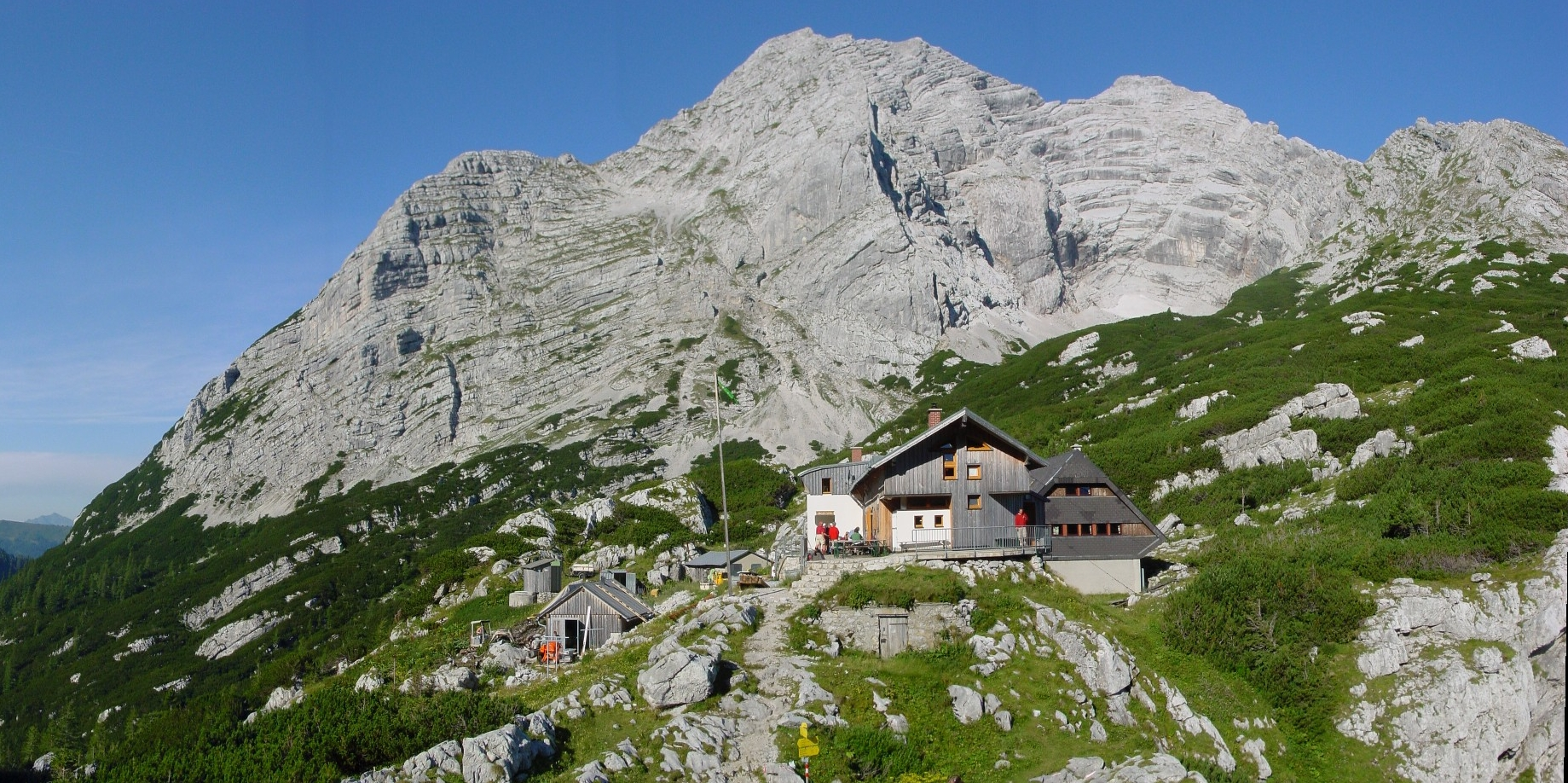
Hochtor with the Hesshütte, an alpine hut in the foreground

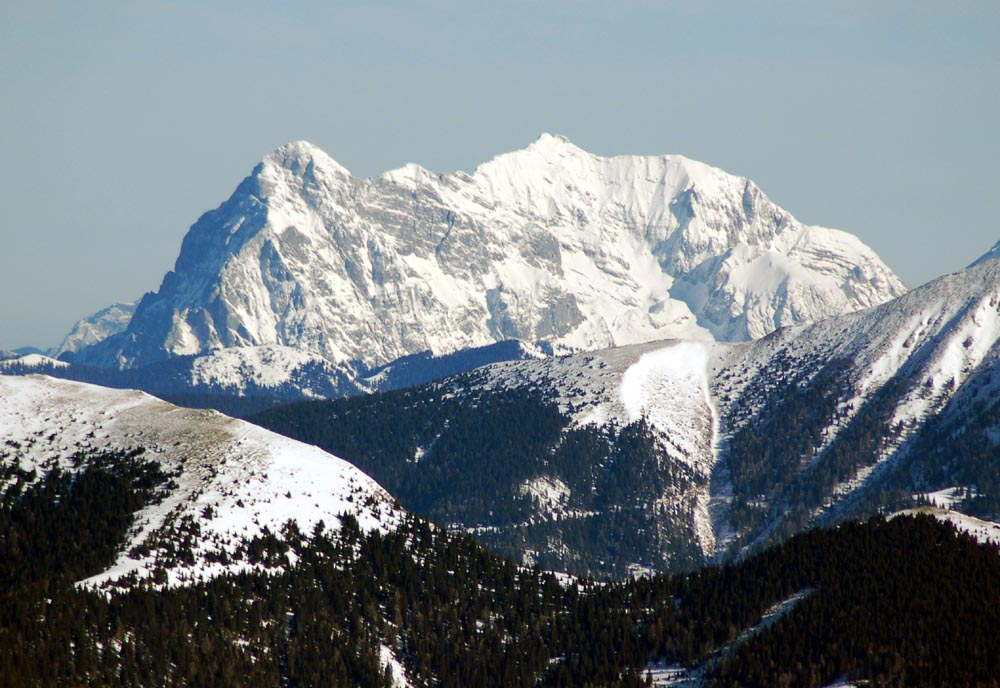
Hochtor - Ödstein Group (from right to left) as seen from Hoher Zinken in the south

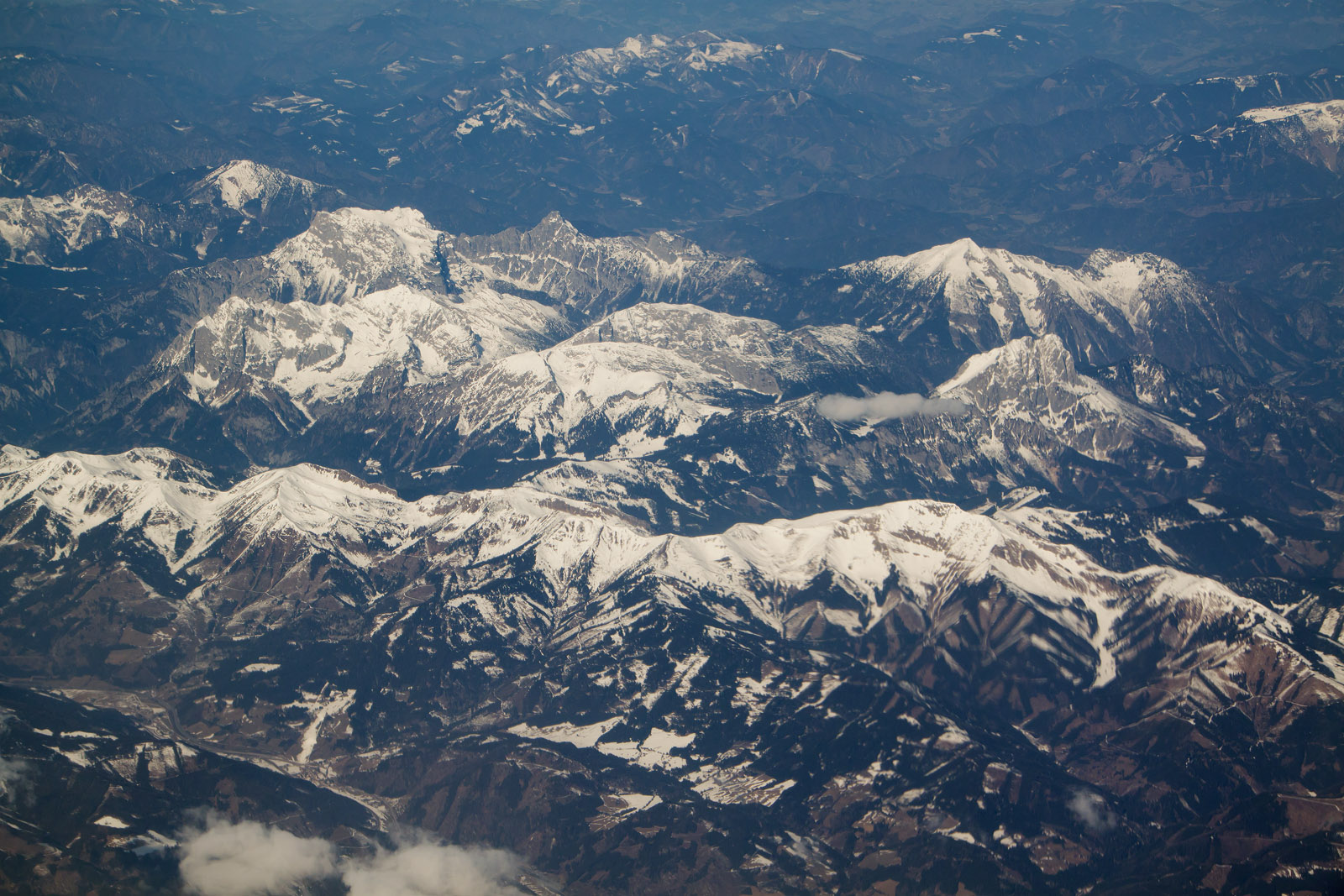
Ennstal Alps from 10 000 m

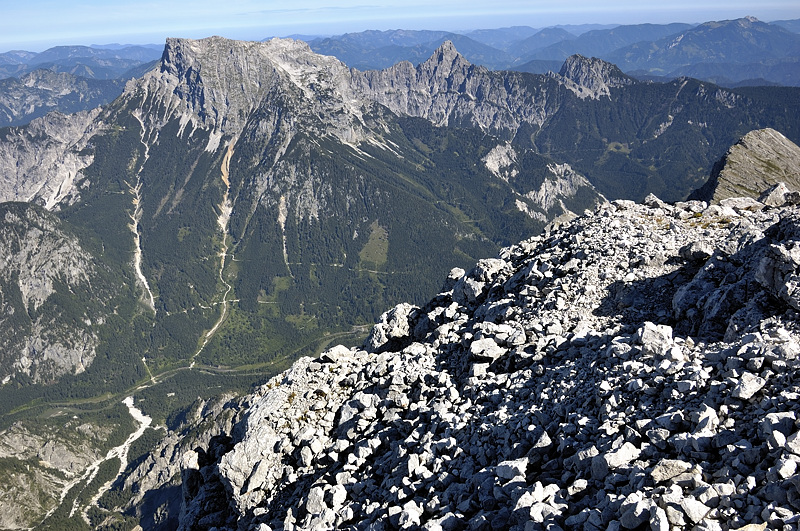
View from Hochtor

== See also ==
- List of Alpine peaks by prominence
