= Eisenerzer Reichenstein =

Mountain in the Ennstal Alps

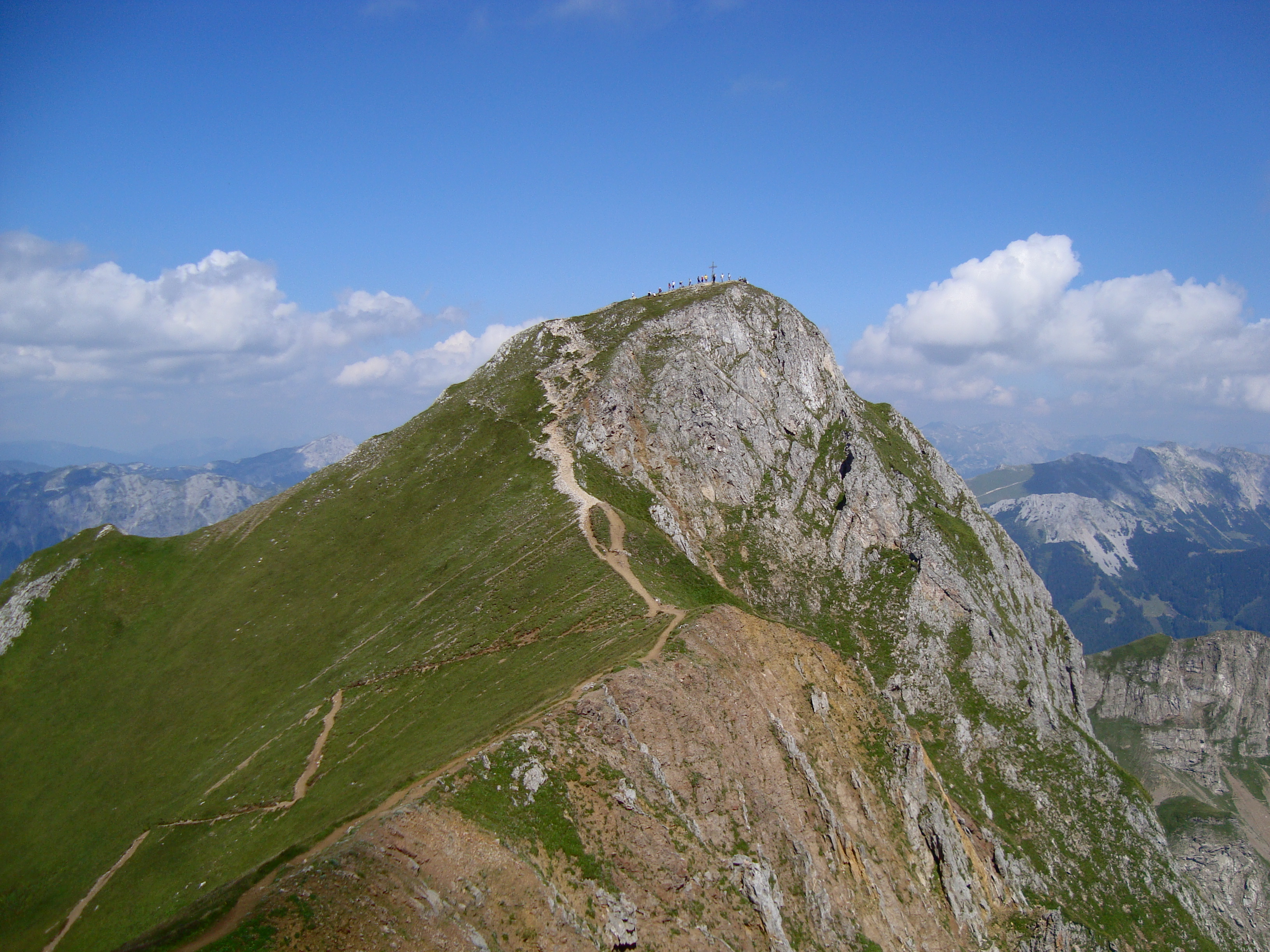
- Northeast summit of the Eisenerzer Reichenstein, seen from the Reichenstein Hut

Highest point
- Elevation: 2,165 m (7,103 ft)
- Prominence: 660 m (2,170 ft)
- Coordinates: 47°30′10″N 14°56′03″E

Geography
- Location within Austria
- Location: Styria, Austria
- Parent range: Ennstal Alps

Geology
- Rock age: Devonian
- Mountain type: Limestone

Climbing
- Normal route: From Präbichl via the Rösselhals

The Eisenerzer Reichenstein is a mountain in the Ennstal Alps in the Austrian federal state of Styria. It lies south of the Erzberg near Eisenerz.

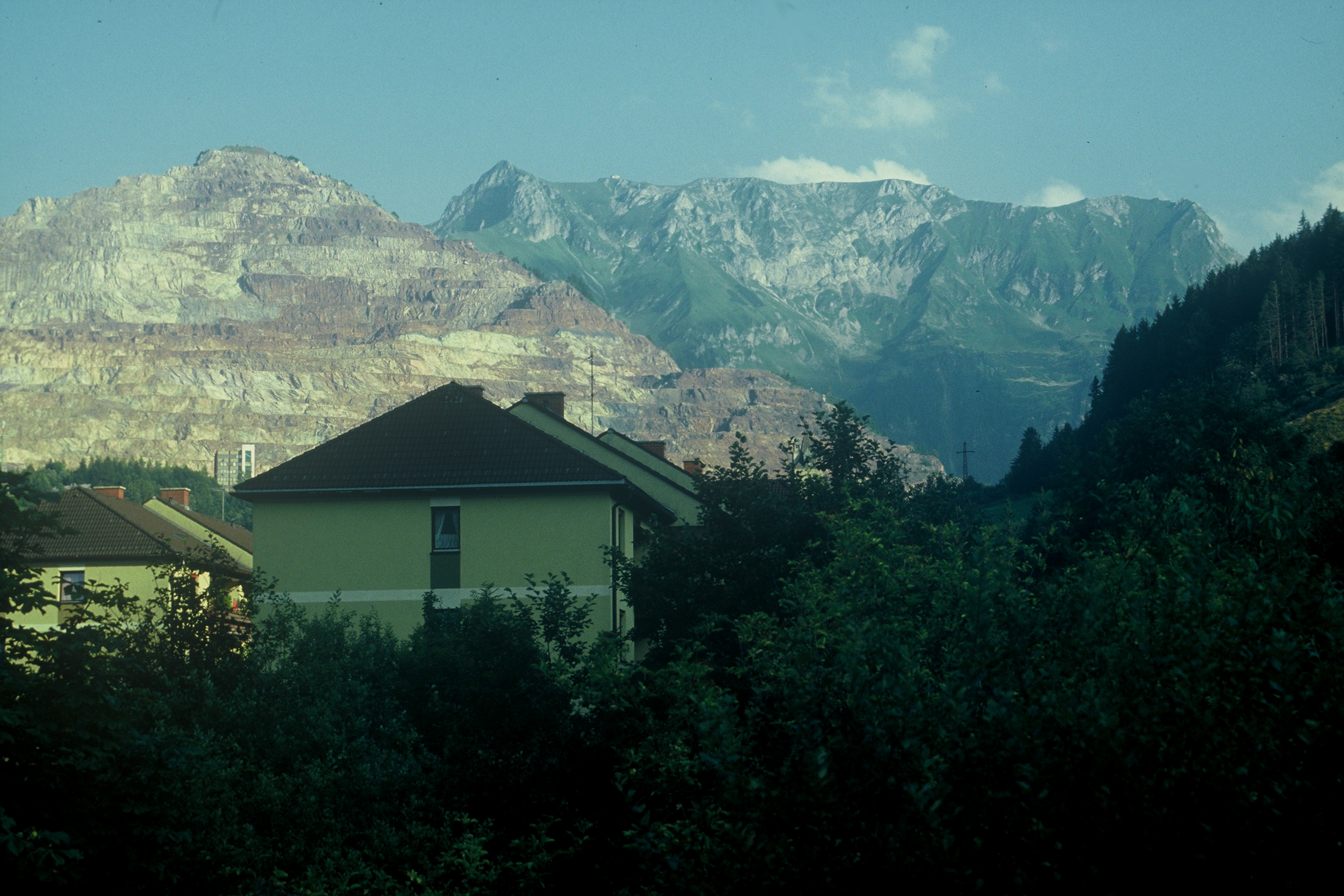
Eisenerzer Reichenstein from Eisenerz

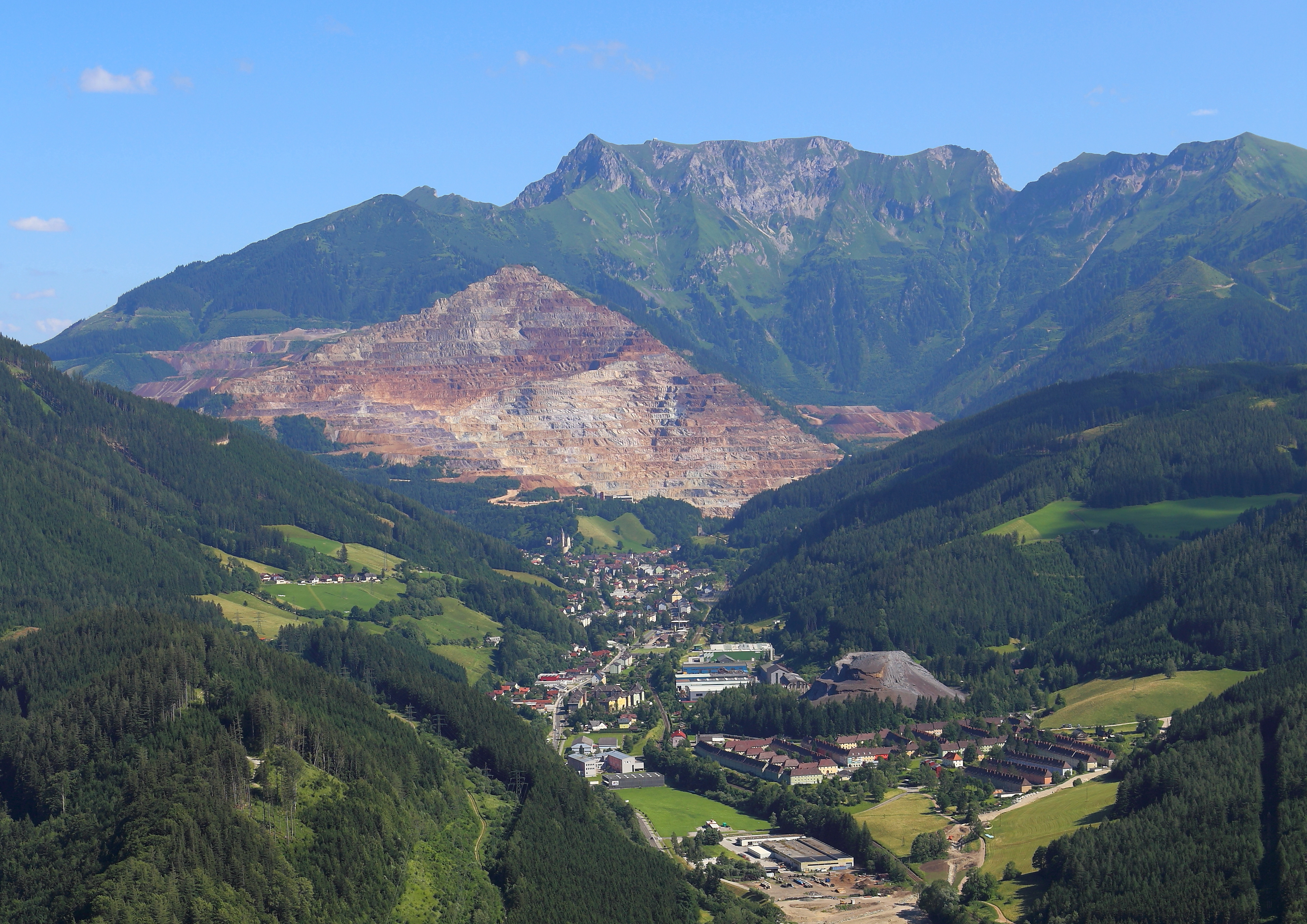
Eisenerzer Reichenstein from Seemauersteig
