= Admont =

- Municipality
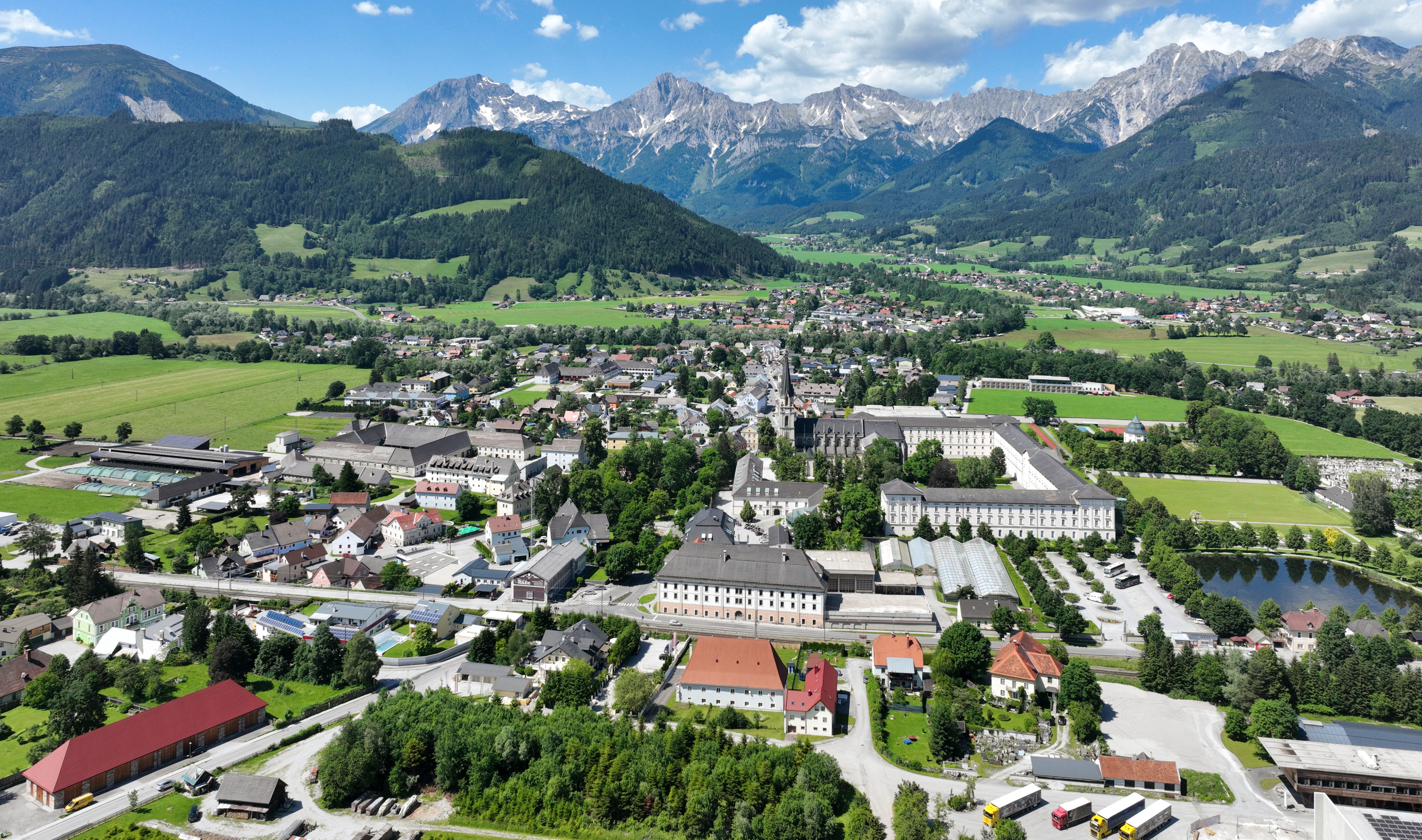
- South view of Admont

- Coat of arms

- Location within Austria
- Coordinates: 47°34′23″N 14°27′40″E
- Country: Austria
- State: Styria
- District: Liezen

Government
  - Mayor: Christian Haider (ÖVP)

Area
  - Total: 300.03 km^{2} (115.84 sq mi)
- Elevation: 640 m (2,100 ft)

Population (2018-01-01)
  - Total: 5,010
  - Density: 16.7/km^{2} (43.2/sq mi)
- Time zone: UTC+1 (CET)
  - Summer (DST): UTC+2 (CEST)
- Postal code: 8911, 8912, 8913
- Area code: 03613
- Vehicle registration: LI
- Website: www.admont.at

Admont (German: [ˈaːd.mɔnt]) is a town in the Austrian state of Styria. It is historically most notable for Admont Abbey, a monastery founded in 1074.

Gesäuse National Park, in which Admont lies, is an area of outstanding beauty. The town is situated in the middle of the Ennstal Alps, in the valley of the Enns River.
