= Hieflau =

- Former municipality
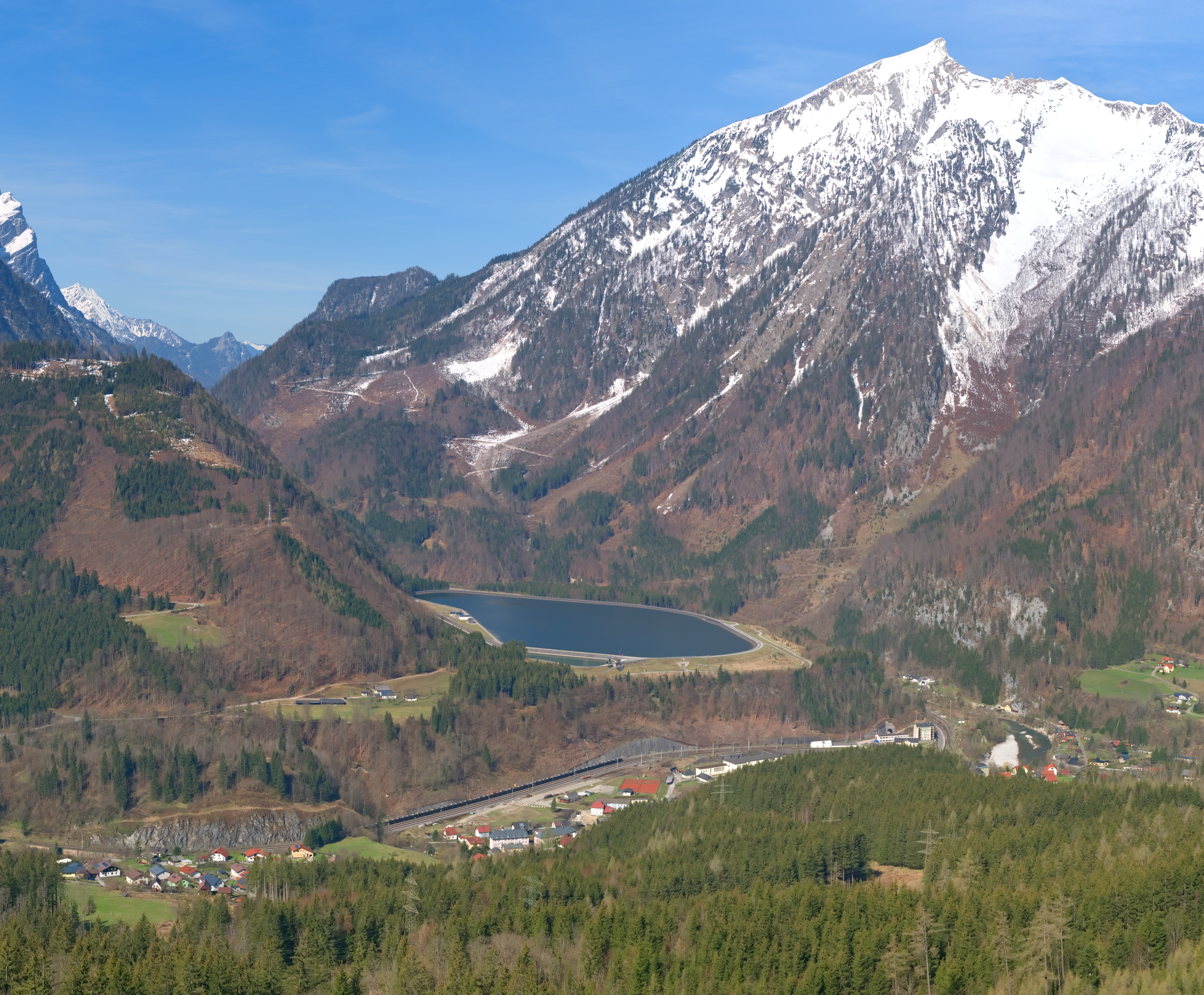
- Hieflau viewed from Rotmauer

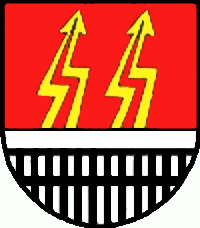
- Coat of arms
- Interactive map of Hieflau
- Location within Austria
- Coordinates: 47°36′00″N 14°45′00″E
- Country: Austria
- State: Styria
- District: Liezen

Area
  - Total: 46.97 km^{2} (18.14 sq mi)
- Elevation: 503 m (1,650 ft)

Population (1 January 2016)
  - Total: 730
  - Density: 16/km^{2} (40/sq mi)
- Time zone: UTC+1 (CET)
  - Summer (DST): UTC+2 (CEST)
- Postal code: 8920
- Area code: 03634
- Vehicle registration: LN
- Website: www.hieflau.steiermark.at

Hieflau is a former municipality in the district of Leoben in Styria, Austria. Since the 2015 Styria municipal structural reform, it is part of the municipality Landl, in the Liezen District.
