= List of prominent mountains of the Alps (2000–2499 m) =

This article contains a table listing by elevation, mountains of the Alps that are between 2000 and 2499 metres high and which also have a topographic prominence of at least 300 metres (984 ft). The list is a continuation of the List of prominent mountains of the Alps (2500–2999 m) and List of prominent mountains of the Alps above 3000 m, which contains an introduction with statistics and an explanation of the criteria.

== Mountains of the Alps between 2000 and 2500 m ==
Rank (Note: Unranked summits have a topographic prominence between 293 and 299 m l. They are included given the uncertainties in estimating these values.)	Mountain	Height (m)	Drop (m) (Note: Numbers in italics are estimates when a precise height for the key col is lacking. For example, maps often provide heights for the place where a route passes over a ridge rather than for the lowest point in the ridge.)	Coordinates	Range (Note: For the Eastern Alps the range names are according to the Alpine Club classification of the Eastern Alps)	Range (Note: SOIUSA codes, representing a proposal for a new classification system of the Alps. The codes usually but not always correspond to established ranges. Sorting on this tab puts the mountains in a geographic order, roughly from the southwest to the east.)	Region (Note: State in Austria and Germany, department in France, province in Italy, and canton in Switzerland)	Country
1052	Marchkopf	2499	372	47°15′04″N 11°48′22″E	Tux Alps	II/B-23.I-B	North Tyrol	AT
1053	Castello di Moschesin	2499	314	46°17′50″N 12°07′58″E	Dolomites – SE	II/C-31.II-B	Belluno	IT
1054	Monte Croce	2496	533	46°10′10″N 11°23′32″E	Fiemme Mountains	II/C-31.V-B	Trentino	IT
1055	Mittlere Kreuzspitze	2496	456	47°20′10″N 10°35′34″E	Lechtal Alps	II/B-21.I-B	North Tyrol	AT
1056	Les Grands Moulins	2495	307	45°24′26″N 06°11′54″E	Belledonne	I/A-05.II.B	Savoie	FR
1057	Wannig	2493	704	47°20′13″N 10°51′44″E	Mieminger Chain	II/B-21.III-A	North Tyrol	AT
1058	Pizzo Camino	2491	525	45°58′54″N 10°10′39″E	Bergamasque Prealps	II/C-29.II-C	Bergamo / Brescia	IT
1059	Fulen	2491	311	46°55′07″N 08°42′53″E	Schwyz Alps	I/B-14.IV-A	Schwyz / Uri	CH
1060	Viezzena	2490	435	46°20′15″N 11°40′32″E	Dolomites – NW	II/C-31.III-B	South Tyrol	IT
1061	Zanggen / Pala di Santa	2488	498	46°20′45″N 11°30′43″E	Fiemme Mountains	II/C-31.V-A	South Tyrol / Trentino	IT
1062	Creton di Clap Grant	2487	518	46°31′45″N 12°40′14″E	Carnic Alps	II/C-33.I-C	Belluno	IT
1063	Piz di Sagron	2486	349	46°10′33″N 11°55′42″E	Dolomites - S	II/C-31.IV-B	Belluno/Trentino	IT
1064	Cima di Pinadee	2486	455	46°30′48″N 08°58′37″E	Adula Alps	I/B-10.III-B	Ticino	CH
1065	Grand Arc	2484	693	45°34′00″N 06°21′53″E	Lauzière Massif	I/B-07.II-F	Savoie	FR
1066	Étale (mountain)	2483	997	45°51′00″N 06°26′52″E	Aravis Range	I/B-08.IV-A	Haute-Savoie / Savoie	FR
1067	Monte Bertrand	2483	385	44°07′04″N 07°40′31″E	Ligurian Alps	I/A-01.II-A	Alpes-Maritimes / Cuneo	FR/IT
1068	Rammelstein	2483	304	46°50′04″N 12°03′11″E	Rieserferner Group	II/A-17.III-A	South Tyrol	IT
1069	Hochkarspitze	2482	662	47°26′51″N 11°21′02″E	Karwendel	II/B-21.IV-A	North Tyrol / Bavaria	AT/DE
1070	Rauchberg	2480	483	47°18′15″N 10°45′32″E	Lechtal Alps	II/B-21.I-B	North Tyrol	AT
1071	Monte Pramaggiore	2478	550	46°21′54″N 12°33′12″E	Carnic Prealps	II/C-33.III-A	Pordenone / Udine	IT
1072	Monte Ziolera	2478	345	46°10′19″N 11°27′18″E	Fiemme Mountains	II/C-31.V-B	Trentino	IT
1073	Spillgerte	2476	453	46°32′12″N 07°26′48″E	Bernese Alps	I/B-14.II-A	Bern	CH
1074	Rettelkirchspitze	2475	687	47°15′35″N 14°07′40″E	Wölz Tauern	II/A-18.III-A	Styria	AT
1074	Bivare / Monte Bìvera	2475	696	46°26′29″N 12°38′31″E	Carnic Alps	II/C-33.I-C	Udine	IT
1076	Greim	2474	686	47°14′52″N 14°09′06″E	Wölz Tauern	II/A-18.III-A	Styria	AT
1077	Monte Rinaldo	2473	675	46°35′56″N 12°39′29″E	Carnic Alps	II/C-33.I-A	Belluno	IT
1078	Pierre Avoi	2473	300	46°07′05″N 07°12′01″E	Pennine Alps	I/B-09.I-D	Valais	CH
	Špik	2473	291	46°26′55″N 13°48′52″E	Julian Alps	II/C-34.I-D	Slovenia	SI
1079	Rappenspitze	2472	305	47°14′12″N 10°11′51″E	Lechtal Alps	II/B-21.I-A	North Tyrol / Vorarlberg	AT
1080	Col Nudo	2471	1644	46°13′39″N 12°24′10″E	Venetian Prealps	II/C-32.II-B	Belluno / Pordenone	IT
1081	Loreakopf	2471	907	47°21′15″N 10°46′18″E	Lechtal Alps	II/B-21.I-B	North Tyrol	AT
1082	Cime de l'Aspre	2471	468	44°10′32″N 06°48′35″E	Maritime Alps	I/A-02.I-D	Alpes-Maritimes	FR
1083	Lungauer Kalkspitze	2471	412	47°16′20″N 13°37′31″E	Schladming Tauern	II/A-18.II-A	Salzburg	AT
1084	Ochsenkopf	2470	352	47°16′31″N 12°04′44″E	Kitzbühel Alps	II/B-23.II-A	North Tyrol / Salzburg	AT
1084	Salzachgeier	2470	352	47°17′37″N 12°06′13″E	Kitzbühel Alps	II/B-23.II-A	North Tyrol / Salzburg	AT
1086	Sasso di Bosconero	2468	938	46°20′11″N 12°16′07″E	Dolomites – SE	II/C-31.II-A	Belluno	IT
1087	Cima Scanaiol	2467	479	46°12′54″N 11°45′57″E	Fiemme Mountains	II/C-31.V-B	Trentino	IT
1088	Gamskarkogel	2467	376	47°09′40″N 13°09′31″E	Ankogel Group	II/A-17.II-F	Salzburg	AT
1089	Hauts-Forts	2466	546	46°10′07″N 06°46′39″E	Chablais Alps	I/B-08.III-A	Haute-Savoie	FR
1090	Pizzo La Scheggia	2466	339	46°11′03″N 08°24′55″E	Ticino Alps	I/B-10.II-B	V-C-O	IT
1091	Creta Forata	2462	857	46°32′33″N 12°44′09″E	Carnic Alps	II/C-33.I-C	Belluno / Udine	IT
1092	Silberspitze	2461	349	47°11′03″N 10°34′22″E	Lechtal Alps	II/B-21.I-A	North Tyrol	AT
1093	Mont Mirantin	2460	571	45°41′03″N 06°29′58″E	Beaufortain Massif	I/B-07.VI-A	Savoie	FR
1093	Pointe de la Grande Journée	2460	571	45°40′03″N 06°30′04″E	Beaufortain Massif	I/B-07.VI-A	Savoie	FR
1095	Rauchkofel	2460	322	46°37′10″N 12°53′00″E	Carnic Alps	II/C-33.I-A	Carinthia	AT
	Cima dei Lasteri	2459	295	46°10′37″N 10°56′54″E	Brenta Dolomites	II/C-28.IV-A	Trentino	IT
1096	Große Bischofsmütze	2458	612	47°29′38″N 13°30′40″E	Dachstein Mts	II/B-25.I-A	Salzburg	AT
1097	Gummfluh	2458	574	46°26′26″N 07°11′42″E	Vaud Alps	I/B-14.I-A	Bern / Vaud	CH
1098	Sonnjoch	2457	625	47°24′44″N 11°36′18″E	Karwendel	II/B-21.IV-A	North Tyrol	AT
1099	Hohniesen	2454	371	46°34′38″N 07°35′00″E	Bernese Alps	I/B-14.II-A	Bern	CH
	Rumer Spitze	2454	296	47°19′13″N 11°25′33″E	Karwendel	II/B-21.IV-A	North Tyrol	AT
1100	Rocher Rond	2453	365	44°41′51″N 05°49′46″E	Dévoluy Mountains	I/A-06.I-B	Drôme / Hautes-Alpes	FR
1101	Gamsjoch	2452	658	47°25′06″N 11°32′56″E	Karwendel	II/B-21.IV-A	North Tyrol	AT
1102	Monte Bussaia	2451	300	44°13′05″N 07°28′05″E	Maritime Alps	I/A-02.I-A	Cuneo	IT
1103	Pomagagnon	2450	370	46°34′26″N 12°08′25″E	Dolomites – NE	II/C-31.I-D	Belluno	IT
1104	Cima Cadi	2449	589	46°13′25″N 10°17′40″E	Ortler Alps	II/C-28.I-B	Brescia / Sondrio	IT
1105	Großer Bösenstein	2448	634	47°26′36″N 14°24′16″E	Rottenmann Tauern	II/A-18.III-B	Styria	AT
1106	Spitzmauer	2446	516	47°41′43″N 14°03′44″E	Totes Gebirge	II/B-25.III-A	Upper Austria	AT
1107	Monte Spondone	2445	306	45°58′50″N 09°47′41″E	Bergamasque Prealps	II/C-29.II-B	Bergamo	IT
1108	Kröndlhorn	2444	461	47°17′56″N 12°09′53″E	Kitzbühel Alps	II/B-23.II-A	North Tyrol / Salzburg	AT
1109	Monte Siera	2443	344	46°32′57″N 12°42′39″E	Carnic Alps	II/C-33.I-C	Belluno / Udine	IT
1110	Eisenhut	2441	800	46°57′07″N 13°55′44″E	Nock Mountains	II/A-19.I-A	Styria	AT
1111	Mürtschenstock	2441	601	47°04′12″N 09°08′39″E	Glarus Alps	I/B-13.II-C	Glarus	CH
1112	Großer Rosennock	2440	657	46°52′39″N 13°42′45″E	Nock Mountains	II/A-19.I-A	Carinthia	AT
1113	Schwarzhorn	2439	637	46°20′05″N 11°27′17″E	Fiemme Mountains	II/C-31.V-A	South Tyrol	IT
1114	Pointe Blanche	2438	825	45°59′58″N 06°27′35″E	Bornes Massif	I/B-08.IV-B	Haute-Savoie	FR
1115	Gufelstock	2436	423	47°01′30″N 09°08′48″E	Glarus Alps	I/B-13.II-A	Glarus	CH
	Kraxenkogel	2436	296	47°15′14″N 13°21′26″E	Radstadt Tauern	II/A-18.I-A	Salzburg	AT
1116	Altmann	2435	313	47°14′22″N 09°22′18″E	Appenzell Alps	I/B-14.V-B	Appenzell / St. Gallen	CH
1117	Laugenspitze	2434	636	46°32′05″N 11°05′10″E	Nonsberg Group	II/C-28.II-A	South Tyrol	IT
1118	Seehorn	2434	567	46°10′57″N 08°06′56″E	Pennine Alps	I/B-09.V-C	Valais	CH
1119	Deneck	2433	359	47°17′28″N 14°03′00″E	Schladming Tauern	II/A-18.II-A	Styria	AT
1120	Cornettes de Bise	2432	1061	46°19′57″N 06°47′05″E	Chablais Alps	I/B-08.III-B	Valais / Haute-Savoie	CH/FR
1121	Mont de Grange	2432	768	46°15′45″N 06°46′51″E	Chablais Alps	I/B-08.III-A	Haute-Savoie	FR
1122	Raz de Bec	2431	535	44°40′05″N 05°59′17″E	Dévoluy Mountains	I/A-06.I-A	Hautes-Alpes	FR
1122	L'Ouillon	2431	367	45°14′24″N 06°12′54″E	Dauphiné Alps	I/A-05.I-B	Isère	FR
1123	Monte Azzarini	2431	331	46°03′35″N 09°38′33″E	Bergamo Alps	II/C-29.I-A	Bergamo / Sondrio	IT
1124	Raucheck	2430	1463	47°29′57″N 13°13′36″E	Tennen Mountains	II/B-24.IV-A	Salzburg	AT
1125	Laliderer Falk	2427	654	47°26′06″N 11°31′09″E	Karwendel	II/B-21.IV-A	North Tyrol	AT
1126	Monte Ferrante	2427	357	45°58′29″N 10°01′43″E	Bergamasque Prealps	II/C-29.II-C	Bergamo	IT
1127	Sforniòi di Mezzo	2425	362	46°20′55″N 12°16′02″E	Dolomites – SE	II/C-31.II-A	Belluno	IT
1128	Großer Galtenberg	2424	513	47°20′12″N 11°58′35″E	Kitzbühel Alps	II/B-23.II-A	North Tyrol	AT
1129	Col della Croce	2423	376	46°09′55″N 11°38′19″E	Fiemme Mountains	II/C-31.V-B	Trentino	IT
1130	Oberwölzer Schoberspitze	2423	333	47°17′21″N 14°09′40″E	Wölz Tauern	II/A-18.III-A	Styria	AT
1131	L'Argentine	2422	393	46°16′24″N 07°7′51″E	Vaud Alps	I/B-12.III-A	Vaud	CH
1132	Monte Cimon	2422	374	46°33′05″N 12°45′47″E	Carnic Alps	II/C-33.I-C	Udine	IT
1133	Monte Capezzone	2421	603	45°56′42″N 08°12′32″E	Monte Rosa Alps	I/B-09.III-C	V-C-O / Vercelli	IT
1134	Geierhaupt	2417	1172	47°22′29″N 14°38′11″E	Seckau Tauern	II/A-18.IV-A	Styria	AT
1135	Monte Alto di Pelsa	2417	455	46°21′21″N 11°59′59″E	Dolomites – SE	II/C-31.II-A	Belluno	IT
1136	Ehrwalder Sonnenspitze	2417	417	47°22′03″N 10°55′19″E	Mieminger Chain	II/B-21.III-A	North Tyrol	AT
1137	Pizzo Erra	2417	301	46°26′28″N 08°53′27″E	Saint-Gotthard Massif	I/B-10.I-B	Ticino	CH
1138	Karhorn	2416	706	47°14′53″N 10°09′04″E	Lechquellen Mts	II/B-21.II-A	Vorarlberg	AT
1139	Hochreichart	2416	336	47°21′48″N 14°40′55″E	Seckau Tauern	II/A-18.IV-B	Styria	AT
1140	Hoh Brisen	2413	489	46°53′51″N 08°27′57″E	Uri Alps	I/B-12.I-B	Nidwalden / Uri	CH
1141	Crodon di Tiarfin	2413	446	46°27′57″N 12°35′30″E	Carnic Alps	II/C-33.I-C	Udine	IT
1142	Schafberg	2413	403	47°10′09″N 09°57′05″E	Lechquellen Mts	II/B-21.II-A	Vorarlberg	AT
1143	Sassolungo di Cibiana	2413	335	46°21′32″N 12°16′58″E	Dolomites – SE	II/C-31.II-A	Belluno	IT
1144	Bleikogel	2411	334	47°30′51″N 13°17′54″E	Tennen Mountains	II/B-24.IV-A	Salzburg	AT
1145	Grignone	2409	1686	45°57′12″N 09°23′15″E	Bergamasque Prealps	II/C-29.II-A	Lecco	IT
1146	Cima di Pramper	2409	540	46°17′48″N 12°10′01″E	Dolomites – SE	II/C-31.II-B	Belluno	IT
1147	Mont Charvin	2409	449	45°48′09″N 06°25′12″E	Aravis Range	I/B-08.IV-A	Haute-Savoie / Savoie	FR
1148	Kilnprein	2408	450	46°59′07″N 13°50′34″E	Nock Mountains	II/A-19.I-A	Salzburg / Styria	AT
1149	Monte Pezza	2408	364	46°24′21″N 11°55′14″E	Dolomites – NW	II/C-31.III-B	Belluno	IT
1150	Sasso Bianco	2407	386	46°24′45″N 11°57′34″E	Dolomites – NW	II/C-31.III-B	Belluno	IT
1151	Zirmebenjoch	2407	310	47°17′38″N 10°32′18″E	Lechtal Alps	II/B-21.I-A	North Tyrol	AT
1152	Monte San Lucano	2406	411	46°18′39″N 11°57′36″E	Dolomites – S	II/C-31.IV-A	Belluno	IT
1153	Erlspitze	2405	607	47°19′12″N 11°17′08″E	Karwendel	II/B-21.IV-A	North Tyrol	AT
1154	Cresta di Enghe	2405	324	46°31′15″N 12°38′04″E	Carnic Alps	II/C-33.I-C	Belluno	IT
1155	Saile	2404	412	47°11′31″N 11°19′31″E	Stubai Alps	II/A-16.II-B	North Tyrol	AT
1156	Bric Costa Rossa	2403	345	44°15′03″N 07°36′00″E	Ligurian Alps	I/A-01.II-B	Cuneo	IT
1157	Zitterklapfen	2403	573	47°16′05″N 09°58′16″E	Lechquellen Mts	II/B-21.II-A	Vorarlberg	AT
1158	Lopa	2402	335	46°22′13″N 13°29′39″E	Julian Alps	II/C-34.I-B	Udine / Slovenia	IT/SI
1159	Fundelkopf	2401	375	47°06′36″N 09°40′35″E	Rätikon	II/A-15.VIII-A	Vorarlberg	AT
1160	Monte Susino	2397	301	45°59′26″N 10°11′12″E	Bergamasque Prealps	II/C-29.II-C	Bergamo / Brescia	IT
1161	Seckauer Zinken	2397	377	47°20′21″N 14°44′10″E	Seckau Tauern	II/A-18.IV-B	Styria	AT
1162	Hochkünzelspitze	2397	352	47°16′19″N 10°01′49″E	Lechquellen Mts	II/B-21.II-A	Vorarlberg	AT
1163	Cima d'Oltro	2397	311	46°13′14″N 11°54′25″E	Dolomites – S	II/C-31.IV-A	Trentino	IT
1164	Zirbitzkogel	2396	1502	47°03′49″N 14°34′02″E	Lavanttal Alps	II/A-19.II-A	Styria	AT
1165	Veliko Špičje	2396	333	46°20′37″N 13°46′00″E	Julian Alps	II/C-34.I-E	Slovenia	SI
1166	Cima di Sette Selle / Sasso Rotto	2396	325	46°07′42″N 11°23′54″E	Fiemme Mountains	II/C-31.V-B	Trentino	IT
1167	Planjava	2394	491	46°21′24″N 14°36′36″E	Kamnik Alps	II/C-35.II-A	Slovenia	SI
1168	Croda di Mezzodi	2394	346	46°31′58″N 12°34′40″E	Carnic Alps	II/C-33.I-C	Belluno	IT
1169	Montagne de Boules	2391	357	44°10′26″N 06°30′02″E	Provence Alps	I/A-03.II-A	Alpes-de-Haute-Provence	FR
1170	Kampspitze	2390	438	47°17′38″N 13°38′34″E	Schladming Tauern	II/A-18.II-A	Styria	AT
1171	Vanil Noir	2389	1120	46°31′43″N 07°08′54″E	Fribourg Prealps	I/B-14.I-B	Fribourg / Vaud	CH
1172	Le Tabor	2389	1022	44°58′38″N 05°51′21″E	Taillefer Massif	I/A-05.IV-A	Isère	FR
1173	Großer Hochkasten	2389	342	47°40′25″N 14°02′51″E	Totes Gebirge	II/B-25.III-A	Styria	AT
1174	Warscheneck	2388	655	47°39′09″N 14°14′29″E	Totes Gebirge	II/B-25.III-B	Upper Austria	AT
1175	Elferkopf	2387	451	47°18′08″N 10°10′40″E	Allgäu Alps	II/B-22.II-A	Vorarlberg	AT
1176	Gamskögel	2386	522	47°21′57″N 14°32′54″E	Seckau Tauern	II/A-18.IV-A	Styria	AT
1177	Gamsberg	2385	1358	47°08′8″N 09°22′34″E	Appenzell Alps	I/B-14.V-A	St. Gallen	CH
1178	Roc de Garnesier	2383	393	44°39′38″N 05°47′33″E	Dévoluy Mountains	I/A-06.I-B	Drôme / Hautes-Alpes	FR
1179	Rudiger	2382	310	47°19′45″N 10°42′06″E	Lechtal Alps	II/B-21.I-B	North Tyrol	AT
1180	Monte Cimone	2379	399	46°25′25″N 13°23′07″E	Julian Alps	II/C-34.I-A	Udine	IT
1181	Monte Ponteranica	2378	375	46°01′45″N 09°35′44″E	Bergamo Alps	II/C-29.I-B	Bergamo / Sondrio	IT
1182	Gartnerwand	2377	434	47°23′06″N 10°49′16″E	Lechtal Alps	II/B-21.I-B	North Tyrol	AT
1183	Knittelkarspitze	2376	1017	47°22′32″N 10°39′04″E	Lechtal Alps	II/B-21.I-B	North Tyrol	AT
1184	Vilan	2376	416	47°00′46″N 09°36′11″E	Rätikon	II/A-15.VIII-A	Graubünden	CH
1185	Pizzo di Campel	2376	332	46°19′55″N 09°15′42″E	Adula Alps	I/B-10.III-D	Graubünden	CH
1186	Hochweberspitze	2375	335	47°18′32″N 14°12′02″E	Wölz Tauern	II/A-18.III-A	Styria	AT
1187	Reither Spitze	2374	300	47°19′23″N 11°14′10″E	Karwendel	II/B-21.IV-A	North Tyrol	AT
1188	La Croix de Cassini	2373	371	45°04′24″N 06°08′03″E	Dauphiné Alps	I/A-05.I-B	Isère	FR
1189	Plenge	2373	303	46°39′09″N 12°54′01″E	Carnic Alps	II/C-33.I-A	Carinthia	AT
1190	Reißkofel	2371	1390	46°41′09″N 13°08′50″E	Gailtal Alps	II/C-33.II-D	Carinthia	AT
1191	Tschirgant	2370	1263	47°14′30″N 10°47′47″E	Mieminger Chain	II/B-21.III-A	North Tyrol	AT
1192	Hohe Pressing	2370	485	46°56′16″N 13°41′32″E	Nock Mountains	II/A-19.I-A	Carinthia	AT
1193	Hochtor	2369	1520	47°33′42″N 14°37′58″E	Ennstal Alps	II/B-26.I-B	Styria	AT
1194	Monte Pegherolo	2369	350	46°01′29″N 09°42′49″E	Bergamo Alps	II/C-29.I-B	Bergamo	IT
1195	Gehrenspitze	2367	319	47°23′12″N 11°08′06″E	Wetterstein	II/B-21.III-B	North Tyrol	AT
1196	Großer Rettenstein	2366	680	47°19′58″N 12°17′49″E	Kitzbühel Alps	II/B-23.II-A	North Tyrol / Salzburg	AT
1197	Croda de R'Ancona	2366	338	46°36′51″N 12°07′04″E	Dolomites – NE	II/C-31.I-B	Belluno	IT
1198	Geißstein	2363	1089	47°20′15″N 12°29′44″E	Kitzbühel Alps	II/B-23.II-C	North Tyrol / Salzburg	AT
1199	Pusterwalder Hohenwart	2363	375	47°19′44″N 14°14′11″E	Wölz Tauern	II/A-18.III-A	Styria	AT
1200	Niesen	2362	407	46°38′46″N 07°39′09″E	Bernese Alps	I/B-14.II-A	Bern	CH
1201	Wistätthorn	2362	370	46°27′15″N 07°23′11″E	Bernese Alps	I/B-14.II-A	Bern	CH
	Cima Brica	2362	299	46°22′49″N 12°32′01″E	Carnic Prealps	II/C-33.III-A	Udine	IT
1202	Großes Teufelshorn	2361	341	47°29′21″N 13°02′10″E	Berchtesgaden Alps	II/B-24.III-B	Salzburg / Bavaria	AT/DE
1203	Poncione Piancascia	2360	325	46°17′55″N 08°44′01″E	Ticino Alps	I/B-10.II-D	Ticino	CH
1204	Vigna Soliva	2356	403	46°00′25″N 09°59′13″E	Bergamasque Prealps	II/C-29.II-C	Bergamo	IT
1205	Großer Rosszahn	2356	317	47°23′14″N 10°28′08″E	Allgäu Alps	II/B-22.II-C	North Tyrol	AT
1206	Grimming	2351	1518	47°31′14″N 14°01′1″E	Dachstein Mts	II/B-25.I-C	Styria	AT
1207	La Tournette	2351	1514	45°49′38″N 06°17′11″E	Bornes Massif	I/B-08.IV-B	Haute-Savoie	FR
1208	Brienzer Rothorn	2350	1342	46°47′14″N 08°02′49″E	Emmental Alps	I/B-14.II-C	Bern / Lucerne / Obwalden	CH
1209	Wittenberghorn	2350	465	46°24′58″N 07°12′36″E	Vaud Alps	I/B-14.I-A	Bern / Vaud	CH
1210	Seekarspitze	2350	324	47°16′22″N 13°32′38″E	Schladming Tauern	II/A-18.II-A	Salzburg	AT
1211	Kahlersberg	2350	315	47°31′53″N 13°01′56″E	Berchtesgaden Alps	II/B-24.III-B	Salzburg / Bavaria	AT/DE
1211	Cima di Canogia	2350	315	46°12′29″N 08°24′49″E	Ticino Alps	I/B-10.II-B	V-C-O	IT
1213	Bavški Grintavec	2347	357	46°22′08″N 13°40′15″E	Julian Alps	II/C-34.I-C	Slovenia	SI
1214	Pletzen	2345	448	47°19′59″N 14°37′02″E	Seckau Tauern	II/A-18.IV-A	Styria	AT
1215	Cimon del Teverone	2345	417	46°12′33″N 12°24′10″E	Venetian Prealps	II/C-32.II-B	Belluno / Pordenone	IT
1216	Ellmauer Halt	2344	1551	47°33′44″N 12°18′11″E	Kaiser Mountains	II/B-21.VI-A	North Tyrol	AT
1217	Kellerjoch (Kreuzjoch)	2344	669	47°19′08″N 11°46′15″E	Tux Alps	II/B-23.I-B	North Tyrol	AT
1218	Steinfeldspitze	2344	542	47°15′58″N 13°27′07″E	Radstadt Tauern	II/A-18.I-A	Salzburg	AT
1219	Monte Chétif	2343	389	45°47′59″N 06°56′56″E	Graian Alps	I/B-07.III-B	Aosta Valley	IT
1220	Briceljk	2343	363	46°23′41″N 13°37′55″E	Julian Alps	II/C-34.I-C	Slovenia	SI
1221	Grand Veymont	2341	1165	44°52′12″N 05°31′36″E	Vercors Massif	I/A-06.III-A	Isère	FR
1222	Thaneller	2341	992	47°25′35″N 10°43′29″E	Lechtal Alps	II/B-21.I-B	North Tyrol	AT
1223	Crève Tête	2341	363	45°27′04″N 06°28′04″E	Vanoise Massif	I/B-07.II-E	Savoie	FR
1224	Wasserbergfirst	2341	325	46°56′22″N 08°47′21″E	Schwyz Alps	I/B-14.IV-A	Schwyz	CH
	Elsighore	2341	296	46°32′05″N 07°38′23″E	Bernese Alps	I/B-14.II-A	Bern	CH
1225	Daniel	2340	1233	47°25′58″N 10°52′49″E	Ammergau Alps	II/B-22.III-A	North Tyrol	AT
1226	Pied Moutet	2339	681	45°00′26″N 06°05′46″E	Massif des Écrins	I/A-05.III-B	Isère	FR
1227	Aserlespitze	2337	329	47°20′26″N 10°45′27″E	Lechtal Alps	II/B-21.I-B	North Tyrol	AT
1228	Großer Grießstein	2337	328	47°23′27″N 14°32′24″E	Seckau Tauern	II/A-18.IV-A	Styria	AT
1229	Cima Dodici	2336	1874	45°59′51″N 11°28′05″E	Vicentine Alps	II/C-32.I-A	Vicenza / Trentino	IT
1230	Hochmölbing	2336	339	47°38′03″N 14°10′41″E	Totes Gebirge	II/B-25.III-B	Styria	AT
1231	Monte Pavione	2335	597	46°06′17″N 11°49′16″E	Dolomites – S	II/C-31.IV-B	Belluno	IT
1232	Pizzo del Moro	2335	516	45°55′49″N 08°07′29″E	Monte Rosa Alps	I/B-09.III-C	V-C-O / Vercelli	IT
1233	Monte Mucrone	2335	309	45°37′13″N 07°56′41″E	Biellese Alps	I/B-09.IV-A	Biella	IT
1234	Monte Terza Piccola	2334	660	46°33′36″N 12°37′29″E	Carnic Alps	II/C-33.I-C	Udine	IT
1235	Rinsennock	2334	435	46°54′32″N 13°51′05″E	Nock Mountains	II/A-19.I-A	Carinthia	AT
1236	Gailtaler Polinik	2332	975	46°37′38″N 12°58′56″E	Carnic Alps	II/C-33.I-B	Carinthia	AT
1237	Maurerberg	2332	469	46°42′15″N 11°49′17″E	Dolomites – NW	II/C-31.III-A	South Tyrol	IT
1238	Tour d'Aï	2331	886	46°22′20″N 07°00′07″E	Vaud Alps	I/B-14.I-A	Vaud	CH
1239	Klomnock	2331	360	46°52′51″N 13°47′17″E	Nock Mountains	II/A-19.I-A	Carinthia	AT
1240	Ackerlspitze	2329	359	47°33′33″N 12°20′51″E	Kaiser Mountains	II/B-21.VI-A	North Tyrol	AT
1241	Bernkogel	2325	330	47°14′55″N 13°02′36″E	Goldberg Group	II/A-17.II-E	Salzburg	AT
1242	Monte Piana	2324	450	46°36′55″N 12°14′33″E	Sexten Dolomites	II/C-31.I-A	Belluno / South Tyrol	IT
1243	Cavallazza	2324	349	46°16′44″N 11°46′35″E	Fiemme Mountains	II/C-31.V-B	Trentino	IT
1244	Cornaget	2323	619	46°18′43″N 12°35′04″E	Carnic Prealps	II/C-33.III-B	Pordenone	IT
1245	Montagne du Cheval Blanc	2323	450	44°07′38″N 06°25′27″E	Provence Alps	I/A-03.II-A	Alpes-de-Haute-Provence	FR
1246	Pointe Noire de Pormenaz	2323	373	45°57′32″N 06°48′05″E	Aiguilles Rouges	I/B-08.I-A	Haute-Savoie	FR
1247	Cima del Fop	2322	325	45°55′59″N 09°51′50″E	Bergamasque Prealps	II/C-29.II-B	Bergamo	IT
	Pizzo Cramalina	2322	297	46°15′19″N 08°37′26″E	Ticino Alps	I/B-10.II-B	Ticino	CH
1248	Seehorn	2321	300	47°31′00″N 12°51′11″E	Berchtesgaden Alps	II/B-24.III-A	Salzburg	AT
1249	Creta di Mimoias	2320	330	46°30′38″N 12°37′29″E	Carnic Alps	II/C-33.I-C	Belluno	IT
1250	Golzentipp	2317	364	46°44′04″N 12°36′14″E	Gailtal Alps	II/C-33.II-A	East Tyrol	AT
1251	Weißhorn	2317	328	46°21′13″N 11°26′41″E	Fiemme Mountains	II/C-31.V-A	South Tyrol	IT
1252	Marmontana	2316	343	46°10′19″N 09°10′13″E	Adula Alps	I/B-10.III-D	Graubünden / Como	CH/IT
1253	Großhansl	2315	304	47°19′07″N 14°15′57″E	Wölz Tauern	II/A-18.III-A	Styria	AT
1254	Nabois Grande	2313	339	46°26′21″N 13°29′18″E	Julian Alps	II/C-34.I-A	Udine	IT
1255	Monte Turlon	2312	482	46°19′19″N 12°30′19″E	Carnic Prealps	II/C-33.III-A	Pordenone	IT
1256	Cima dei Vieres	2310	504	46°18′35″N 12°29′05″E	Carnic Prealps	II/C-33.III-A	Pordenone	IT
1257	Großer Beil	2309	311	47°20′29″N 12°01′38″E	Kitzbühel Alps	II/B-23.II-A	North Tyrol	AT
1258	Hinterrugg	2306	470	47°09′13″N 09°18′17″E	Appenzell Alps	I/B-14.V-A	St. Gallen	CH
1259	Caserine Alte	2306	382	46°18′53″N 12°37′54″E	Carnic Prealps	II/C-33.III-B	Pordenone	IT
1260	Schaufelspitze	2306	312	47°25′23″N 11°36′28″E	Karwendel	II/B-21.IV-A	North Tyrol	AT
1261	Monte Civrari	2302	404	45°11′31″N 07°19′38″E	Graian Alps	I/B-07.I-A	Turin	IT
1262	Monte Togano	2301	1473	46°05′23″N 08°23′39″E	Ticino Alps	I/B-10.II-C	V-C-O	IT
1263	Cima di Menna	2300	449	45°55′47″N 09°45′36″E	Bergamasque Prealps	II/C-29.II-B	Bergamo	IT
1264	Hochiss	2299	1359	47°27′30″N 11°45′54″E	Brandenberg Alps	II/B-21.V-A	North Tyrol	AT
1265	Bruderkogel	2299	475	47°23′16″N 14°25′20″E	Rottenmann Tauern	II/A-18.III-B	Styria	AT
1266	Steinkogel	2299	325	47°17′55″N 12°14′11″E	Kitzbühel Alps	II/B-23.II-A	Salzburg	AT
1267	Mutteristock	2294	744	47°02′54″N 08°56′35″E	Schwyz Alps	I/B-14.IV-C	Glarus / Schwyz	CH
1268	Lastìa de Framónt	2294	361	46°18′51″N 12°02′07″E	Dolomites – SE	II/C-31.II-A	Belluno	IT
1269	Höllwand	2287	494	47°16′57″N 13°09′50″E	Ankogel Group	II/A-17.II-F	Salzburg	AT
1270	Lumkofel	2287	340	46°43′16″N 12°50′32″E	Gailtal Alps	II/C-33.II-B	Carinthia	AT
1271	Stadelhorn	2286	1121	47°35′34″N 12°47′45″E	Berchtesgaden Alps	II/B-24.III-D	Salzburg / Bavaria	AT/DE
1272	Montagne de Coste Longue	2286	382	44°08′02″N 06°29′07″E	Provence Alps	I/A-03.II-A	Alpes-de-Haute-Provence	FR
1273	Ochsenkopf	2286	341	47°06′53″N 09°37′29″E	Rätikon	II/A-15.VIII-A	Vorarlberg / Liechtenstein	AT/LI
1274	Grande Moucherolle	2284	454	45°00′20″N 05°33′57″E	Vercors Massif	I/A-06.III-A	Isère	FR
1275	Rautispitz	2283	465	47°04′16″N 09°01′42″E	Schwyz Alps	I/B-14.IV-C	Glarus	CH
1276	Druesberg	2282	709	47°00′15″N 08°50′01″E	Schwyz Alps	I/B-14.IV-A	Schwyz	CH
1277	Trogkofel	2280	736	46°34′14″N 13°13′01″E	Carnic Alps	II/C-33.I-B	Carinthia / Udine	AT/IT
1278	Großer Daumen	2280	354	47°26′29″N 10°22′32″E	Allgäu Alps	II/B-22.II-C	Bavaria	DE
1279	Brisi	2279	325	47°09′12″N 09°16′36″E	Appenzell Alps	I/B-14.V-A	St. Gallen	CH
1280	Rauer Knöll	2278	330	47°23′13″N 11°37′24″E	Karwendel	II/B-21.IV-A	North Tyrol	AT
1281	Hochschwab	2277	1045	47°37′06″N 15°08′32″E	Hochschwab	II/B-26.II-A	Styria	AT
1282	Jauken (Torkofel)	2276	661	46°42′07″N 13°04′36″E	Gailtal Alps	II/C-33.II-D	Carinthia	AT
1283	Kronplatz (Spitzhörnle)	2275	513	46°44′20″N 11°57′29″E	Dolomites – NE	II/C-31.I-B	South Tyrol	IT
1284	Leilachspitze	2274	423	47°26′19″N 10°32′46″E	Allgäu Alps	II/B-22.II-C	North Tyrol	AT
1285	Tosc	2273	300	46°21′24″N 13°52′06″E	Julian Alps	II/C-34.I-E	Slovenia	SI
1286	Rotgschirr	2270	376	47°42′06″N 13°59′47″E	Totes Gebirge	II/B-25.III-A	Styria / Upper Austria	AT
1287	Monte Chiadin	2269	540	46°35′50″N 12°44′18″E	Carnic Alps	II/C-33.I-A	Belluno / Udine	IT
1288	Monte Vacalizza	2266	326	46°18′18″N 12°28′36″E	Carnic Prealps	II/C-33.III-A	Pordenone	IT
1289	Hochschottwies	2262	344	47°30′51″N 13°07′29″E	Berchtesgaden Alps	II/B-24.III-B	Salzburg	AT
1290	Cima Carega	2259	1185	45°43′27″N 11°07′48″E	Venetian Prealps	II/C-32.II-B	Trentino	IT
1291	Höfats	2259	478	47°22′01″N 10°20′59″E	Allgäu Alps	II/B-22.II-C	Bavaria	DE
1292	Croix de Rougny	2259	305	44°51′33″N 05°59′58″E	Massif des Écrins	I/A-05.III-D	Isère	FR
1293	Soiernspitze	2257	833	47°28′54″N 11°21′27″E	Karwendel	II/B-21.IV-B	Bavaria	DE
1294	Monte Cadria	2254	1434	45°56′19″N 10°41′53″E	Garda Prealps	II/C-30.II-A	Trentino	IT
1295	Dent de Savigny	2252	853	46°32′59″N 07°13′36″E	Fribourg Prealps	I/B-14.I-B	Fribourg / Vaud	CH
1296	Hirschkopf	2252	305	47°13′57″N 12°56′33″E	Goldberg Group	II/A-17.II-E	Salzburg	AT
1297	Admonter Reichenstein	2251	812	47°32′57″N 14°32′39″E	Ennstal Alps	II/B-26.I-B	Styria	AT
1298	Cimon del Cavallo	2251	380	46°08′00″N 12°29′47″E	Venetian Prealps	II/C-32.II-B	Belluno / Pordenone	IT
1299	Punta Setteventi	2250	358	45°51′37″N 10°23′34″E	Brescia Prealps	II/C-30.I-A	Brescia	IT
1300	Morgenberghorn	2249	370	46°37′20″N 07°47′37″E	Bernese Alps	I/B-14.II-B	Bern	CH
1301	Hochkogel	2249	311	47°19′42″N 12°37′01″E	Kitzbühel Alps	II/B-23.II-C	Salzburg	AT
1302	Rötelstein	2247	424	47°27′26″N 13°33′19″E	Dachstein Mts	II/B-25.I-B	Salzburg	AT
1303	Gaishorn	2247	388	47°28′12″N 10°28′37″E	Allgäu Alps	II/B-22.II-C	North Tyrol	AT
1304	Sparafeld	2247	361	47°32′58″N 14°31′49″E	Ennstal Alps	II/B-26.I-B	Styria	AT
1305	Pizzo di Gino	2245	367	46°07′25″N 09°08′42″E	Lugano Prealps	I/B-11.I-A	Como	IT
1306	Großer Pyhrgas	2244	1290	47°39′09″N 14°23′53″E	Ennstal Alps	II/B-26.I-A	Styria / Upper Austria	AT
1307	Roc d'Enfer	2244	1081	46°11′23″N 06°36′43″E	Chablais Alps	I/B-08.III-C	Haute-Savoie	FR
1308	Krn	2244	609	46°15′58″N 13°39′30″E	Julian Alps	II/C-34.I-F	Slovenia	SI
1309	Piz di Mezzodì	2240	1248	46°13′08″N 12°02′10″E	Dolomites – SE	II/C-31.II-B	Belluno	IT
	Rosskofel /M Cavallo di Pontebba	2239	297	46°33′02″N 13°14′25″E	Carnic Alps	II/C-33.I-B	Carinthia / Udine	AT/IT
1310	Köllenspitze	2238	1088	47°29′56″N 10°37′49″E	Allgäu Alps	II/B-22.II-E	North Tyrol	AT
1311	Hochstuhl / Veliki Stol	2237	1021	46°26′01″N 14°10′29″E	Karawanks	II/C-35.I-A	Carinthia / Slovenia	AT/SI
1312	Monte Larone	2237	415	46°13′09″N 08°21′46″E	Ticino Alps	I/B-10.II-A	V-C-O	IT
1313	Latschur	2236	1268	46°44′18″N 13°23′48″E	Gailtal Alps	II/C-33.II-E	Carinthia	AT
1314	Croise Baulet	2236	435	45°53′56″N 06°33′10″E	Aravis Range	I/B-08.IV-A	Haute-Savoie	FR
1315	Schafberg	2235	726	46°38′13″N 07°18′59″E	Fribourg Prealps	I/B-14.I-B	Bern / Fribourg	CH
1316	Pasubio (Cima Palon)	2232	1070	45°47′32″N 11°10′35″E	Vicentine Alps	II/C-32.I-B	Trentino	IT
1317	Pointe d'Almet	2232	511	45°58′53″N 06°31′19″E	Bornes Massif	I/B-08.IV-B	Haute-Savoie	FR
1318	Geierkogel	2231	326	47°23′59″N 14°29′59″E	Seckau Tauern	II/A-18.IV-A	Styria	AT
1319	Hoher Ifen	2230	478	47°21′16″N 10°06′00″E	Allgäu Alps	II/B-22.II-A	Vorarlberg / Bavaria	AT/DE
1320	Monte Messer	2230	328	46°10′31″N 12°27′18″E	Venetian Prealps	II/C-32.II-B	Belluno / Pordenone	IT
1321	Monte Lavanech	2229	336	45°57′05″N 10°32′36″E	Adamello-Presanella Alps	II/C-28.III-A	Trentino	IT
1322	Monte Borga	2228	438	46°17′37″N 12°20′58″E	Carnic Prealps	II/C-33.III-A	Belluno / Pordenone	IT
1323	Gumpeneck	2226	356	47°23′50″N 14°00′53″E	Wölz Tauern	II/A-18.III-A	Styria	AT
1324	Großer Buchstein	2224	1363	47°36′32″N 14°36′15″E	Ennstal Alps	II/B-26.I-B	Styria	AT
1325	Kalški Greben	2224	431	46°19′53″N 14°32′17″E	Kamnik Alps	II/C-35.II-B	Slovenia	SI
1326	Rappenspitze	2223	323	47°24′08″N 11°38′45″E	Karwendel	II/B-21.IV-A	North Tyrol	AT
1327	Sosto	2221	524	46°32′54″N 08°57′07″E	Adula Alps	I/B-10.III-B	Ticino	CH
1328	Dent d'Oche	2221	306	46°21′12″N 06°43′52″E	Chablais Alps	I/B-08.III-B	Haute-Savoie	FR
1329	Hochrettelstein	2220	341	47°25′29″N 14°13′58″E	Wölz Tauern	II/A-18.III-A	Styria	AT
1330	Hochkarfelderkopf	2219	320	47°31′09″N 13°21′20″E	Tennen Mountains	II/B-24.IV-A	Salzburg	AT
1331	Cima Valdritta	2218	1950	45°43′35″N 10°50′38″E	Garda Mountains	II/C-30.II-C	Verona / Trentino	IT
1332	Pointe d'Arcalod	2217	1713	45°40′54″N 06°13′42″E	Bauges	I/B-08.V-A	Savoie	FR
1333	Lugauer	2217	659	47°33′13″N 14°43′22″E	Ennstal Alps	II/B-26.I-B	Styria	AT
1334	Kleiner Rettenstein	2216	503	47°20′11″N 12°20′30″E	Kitzbühel Alps	II/B-23.II-A	North Tyrol	AT
1335	Les Jumelles	2215	365	46°21′07″N 06°48′44″E	Chablais Alps	I/B-08.III-B	Valais	CH
1336	Steinbergstein	2215	313	47°20′29″N 12°11′25″E	Kitzbühel Alps	II/B-23.II-A	North Tyrol	AT
1337	Gößeck	2214	832	47°26′53″N 14°53′59″E	Ennstal Alps	II/B-26.I-C	Styria	AT
1338	Schwarzwand	2214	480	47°00′27″N 13°41′35″E	Nock Mountains	II/A-19.I-A	Carinthia / Salzburg	AT
1339	Aineck	2210	515	47°03′20″N 13°38′18″E	Nock Mountains	II/A-19.I-A	Carinthia / Salzburg	AT
1340	Würflinghöhe	2210	460	47°00′27″N 13°57′06″E	Nock Mountains	II/A-19.I-A	Styria	AT
1341	Monte La Palazza	2210	417	46°18′38″N 12°21′21″E	Carnic Prealps	II/C-33.III-A	Belluno / Pordenone	IT
1342	Rombon	2208	310	46°22′02″N 13°33′14″E	Julian Alps	II/C-34.I-B	Slovenia	SI
1343	Mont Charvin	2207	457	45°13′03″N 06°17′06″E	Dauphiné Alps	I/A-05.I-A	Savoie	FR
1344	Hoher Trieb	2199	415	46°35′49″N 13°03′42″E	Carnic Alps	II/C-33.I-B	Carinthia / Udine	AT/IT
1345	Pointe de la Sambuy	2198	466	45°41′30″N 06°15′56″E	Bauges	I/B-08.V-A	Haute-Savoie	FR
1346	Galinakopf	2198	357	47°09′06″N 09°37′15″E	Rätikon	II/A-15.VIII-A	Vorarlberg / Liechtenstein	AT/LI
1347	Cima di Vanerle	2198	306	46°03′05″N 10°16′53″E	Bergamasque Prealps	II/C-29.II-C	Brescia	IT
1348	Pécloz	2197	679	45°37′55″N 06°13′50″E	Bauges	I/B-08.V-A	Savoie	FR
1349	Hohgant	2197	636	46°47′17″N 07°54′06″E	Emmental Alps	I/B-14.II-C	Bern	CH
1350	Scheiblingstein	2197	323	47°39′12″N 14°25′26″E	Ennstal Alps	II/B-26.I-A	Styria / Upper Austria	AT
1351	Große Arnspitze	2196	993	47°23′51″N 11°13′22″E	Wetterstein	II/B-21.III-B	North Tyrol / Bavaria	AT/DE
1352	Chrüz	2196	589	46°57′18″N 09°46′30″E	Rätikon	II/A-15.VIII-A	Graubünden	CH
1353	Hochschwung	2196	342	47°24′26″N 14°20′22″E	Rottenmann Tauern	II/A-18.III-B	Styria	AT
1354	Zuc dal Bôr / Zuc del Bor	2195	1112	46°26′58″N 13°15′31″E	Carnic Alps	II/C-33.I-D	Udine	IT
1355	Gartnerkofel	2195	665	46°34′17″N 13°18′15″E	Carnic Alps	II/C-33.I-B	Carinthia	AT
1356	Hochwipfel	2195	412	46°35′40″N 13°10′36″E	Carnic Alps	II/C-33.I-B	Carinthia	AT
1357	Guffert	2194	1143	47°32′46″N 11°47′21″E	Brandenberg Alps	II/B-21.V-A	North Tyrol	AT
1358	Cima della Laurasca	2193	371	46°03′29″N 08°28′34″E	Ticino Alps	I/B-10.II-C	V-C-O	IT
1359	Hochzinödl	2191	495	47°33′57″N 14°39′59″E	Ennstal Alps	II/B-26.I-B	Styria	AT
1360	Stockhorn	2190	399	46°41′38″N 07°32′15″E	Bernese Alps	I/B-14.II-A	Bern	CH
1361	Hinterer Geißstein	2190	351	47°18′24″N 13°32′19″E	Schladming Tauern	II/A-18.II-A	Salzburg	AT
1362	Blayeul	2189	949	44°14′50″N 06°18′44″E	Provence Alps	I/A-03.I-A	Alpes-de-Haute-Provence	FR
1363	Gros Van	2189	528	46°23′47″N 07°04′09″E	Vaud Alps	I/B-14.I-A	Vaud	CH
1364	Gridone	2188	1231	46°07′25″N 08°38′53″E	Ticino Alps	I/B-10.II-C	V-C-O / Ticino	CH/IT
1365	Ochsen	2188	384	46°41′56″N 07°25′07″E	Bernese Alps	I/B-14.II-A	Bern	CH
1366	Ameringkogel	2187	1232	47°04′24″N 14°48′29″E	Lavanttal Alps	II/A-20.I-A	Styria	AT
1367	Monte Sernio	2187	941	46°28′30″N 13°08′15″E	Carnic Alps	II/C-33.I-D	Udine	IT
1368	Pizzocco	2187	324	46°08′24″N 12°00′34″E	Dolomites – S	II/C-31.IV-B	Belluno	IT
1369	Kreuzspitze	2185	1182	47°31′36″N 10°55′06″E	Ammergau Alps	II/B-22.III-A	Bavaria	DE
1370	Monte Misa	2184	389	45°54′04″N 10°26′39″E	Adamello-Presanella Alps	II/C-28.III-A	Brescia	IT
1371	Monte Rite	2183	618	46°23′04″N 12°15′29″E	Dolomites – SE	II/C-31.II-A	Belluno	IT
1372	Pizzo Stagno	2183	342	46°04′38″N 08°27′33″E	Ticino Alps	I/B-10.II-C	V-C-O	IT
1373	Trélod	2181	686	45°41′34″N 06°11′47″E	Bauges	I/B-08.V-A	Savoie / Haute-Savoie	FR
1374	Monte Bondone (Cornetto)	2180	1679	45°59′17″N 11°01′53″E	Garda Mountains	II/C-30.II-C	Trentino	IT
1375	Wertatscha / Vrtača	2180	340	46°26′23″N 14°12′45″E	Karawanks	II/C-35.I-A	Carinthia / Slovenia	AT/SI
1376	Lüschgrat	2178	332	46°42′06″N 09°20′41″E	Adula Alps	I/B-10.III-C	Graubünden	CH
1377	Grignetta	2177	377	45°55′18″N 09°23′25″E	Bergamasque Prealps	II/C-29.II-A	Lecco	IT
1378	Pointe d'entre Deux Pertuis	2176	398	46°14′03″N 06°43′52″E	Chablais Alps	I/B-08.III-A	Haute-Savoie	FR
1379	Signal de l'Homme	2176	361	45°04′01″N 06°05′08″E	Dauphiné Alps	I/A-05.I-B	Isère	FR
1380	Bulacia / Puflatsch	2174	329	46°33′50″N 11°36′54″E	Dolomites – NW	II/C-31.III-A	South Tyrol	IT
1381	Hexenturm	2172	358	47°38′45″N 14°28′52″E	Ennstal Alps	II/B-26.I-A	Styria	AT
1382	Goldachnock	2171	787	47°02′05″N 14°03′27″E	Gurktal Alps	II/A-19.I-B	Styria	AT
1383	Monte Crot	2169	364	46°25′38″N 12°05′59″E	Dolomites – SE	II/C-31.II-A	Belluno	IT
1384	Monte Chiarescons	2168	332	46°20′52″N 12°37′35″E	Carnic Prealps	II/C-33.III-B	Pordenone / Udine	IT
1385	Dobratsch	2166	1233	46°36′12″N 13°40′16″E	Gailtal Alps	II/C-33.II-F	Carinthia	AT
1386	Col Rosa	2166	432	46°35′10″N 12°05′51″E	Dolomites – NE	II/C-31.I-D	Belluno	IT
1387	Eisenerzer Reichenstein	2165	660	47°30′09″N 14°56′04″E	Ennstal Alps	II/B-26.I-C	Styria	AT
1388	Gehrenspitze	2163	305	47°30′01″N 10°39′19″E	Allgäu Alps	II/B-22.II-E	North Tyrol	AT
1389	Geierköpfe	2161	495	47°31′11″N 10°52′30″E	Ammergau Alps	II/B-22.III-A	North Tyrol	AT
1390	Monte Massone	2161	411	45°56′49″N 08°20′17″E	Monte Rosa Alps	I/B-09.III-C	V-C-O	IT
1391	Pic de Gleize	2161	362	44°38′04″N 06°02′38″E	Dévoluy Mountains	I/A-06.I-A	Hautes-Alpes	FR
1392	Zuccone Campelli	2159	507	45°57′12″N 09°31′01″E	Bergamasque Prealps	II/C-29.II-A	Lecco	IT
1393	Monte Zeda	2156	348	46°02′44″N 08°32′07″E	Ticino Alps	I/B-10.II-C	V-C-O	IT
1394	Dosso della Torta	2156	305	45°58′00″N 10°45′50″E	Garda Prealps	II/C-30.II-A	Trentino	IT
1395	Frudiger	2153	431	46°58′08″N 10°34′46″E	Ötztal Alps	II/A-16.I-C	North Tyrol	AT
1396	Monte Padrio	2153	309	46°11′12″N 10°13′39″E	Ortler Alps	II/C-28.I-B	Brescia / Sondrio	IT
1397	Hochmatt	2152	428	46°34′33″N 07°13′12″E	Fribourg Prealps	I/B-14.I-B	Fribourg	CH
1398	Becco di Filadonna	2150	943	45°57′49″N 11°11′35″E	Vicentine Alps	II/C-32.I-A	Trentino	IT
1399	Cresta Le Coraie	2149	474	46°12′35″N 12°04′39″E	Dolomites – S	II/C-31.IV-A	Belluno	IT
1400	Pizzo Camino	2148	323	45°58′39″N 08°14′04″E	Monte Rosa Alps	I/B-09.III-C	V-C-O	IT
1401	Wöllaner Nock	2145	1042	46°46′36″N 13°49′47″E	Gurktal Alps	II/A-19.I-C	Carinthia	AT
1402	Mittagskogel / Kepa	2143	705	46°30′24″N 13°57′10″E	Karawanks	II/C-35.I-A	Carinthia / Slovenia	AT/SI
1403	Monte Zermula	2143	591	46°33′41″N 13°09′05″E	Carnic Alps	II/C-33.I-B	Udine	IT
1404	Goldeck	2142	417	46°45′31″N 13°27′34″E	Gailtal Alps	II/C-33.II-E	Carinthia	AT
1405	Großer Speikkogel	2140	971	46°47′15″N 14°58′18″E	Lavanttal Alps	II/A-20.I-B	Carinthia	AT
1406	Gstoder	2140	906	47°08′33″N 13°59′33″E	Schladming Tauern	II/A-18.II-B	Salzburg / Styria	AT
1407	Hochobir / Ojstrc	2139	1071	46°30′21″N 14°29′16″E	Karawanks	II/C-35.I-B	Carinthia	AT
1408	Kammspitz	2139	658	47°28′34″N 13°53′06″E	Dachstein Mts	II/B-25.I-C	Styria	AT
1409	Strimskogel	2139	400	47°18′43″N 13°28′15″E	Radstadt Tauern	II/A-18.I-A	Salzburg	AT
1410	Koschutnikturm /Košutnikov turn	2136	767	46°26′46″N 14°24′38″E	Karawanks	II/C-35.I-A	Carinthia / Slovenia	AT/SI
1411	Dôme de Barrot	2136	456	44°02′13″N 06°55′02″E	Maritime Alps	I/A-02.I-D	Alpes-Maritimes	FR
1412	Cime de Marta / Cima Marta	2135	535	44°01′06″N 07°39′25″E	Ligurian Alps	I/A-01.II-A	Alpes-Maritimes	FR
1413	Monte Colli	2135	319	46°01′55″N 10°12′05″E	Bergamasque Prealps	II/C-29.II-C	Bergamo	IT
1414	Glatthorn	2134	648	47°15′55″N 09°52′47″E	Bregenz Forest Mts	II/B-22.I-A	Vorarlberg	AT
1415	Monte Serva	2133	478	46°12′01″N 12°13′58″E	Dolomites – SE	II/C-31.II-B	Belluno	IT
1416	Storžič	2132	667	46°21′00″N 14°24′19″E	Kamnik Alps	II/C-35.II-A	Slovenia	SI
1417	Monte Birrone	2131	436	44°32′33″N 07°15′08″E	Cottian Alps	I/A-04.I-A	Cuneo	IT
1418	Pilatus (Tomlishorn)	2128	585	46°58′26″N 08°14′28″E	Emmental Alps	I/B-14.III-A	Nidwalden / Obwalden	CH
1419	Elm	2128	388	47°40′25″N 13°57′47″E	Totes Gebirge	II/B-25.III-A	Styria	AT
1420	Kordeschkopf / Kordeževa glava	2126	882	46°30′00″N 14°46′50″E	Karawanks	II/C-35.I-C	Carinthia / Slovenia	AT/SI
1421	Jerebica	2126	425	46°23′53″N 13°33′54″E	Julian Alps	II/C-34.I-B	Udine / Slovenia	IT/SI
1422	Paganella (Cima Roda)	2124	1099	46°08′36″N 11°02′15″E	Brenta Dolomites	II/C-28.IV-A	Trentino	IT
1423	Kuhgrat	2123	681	47°10′00″N 09°33′39″E	Rätikon	II/A-15.VIII-A	Liechtenstein	LI
1424	Montagne du Carton	2123	362	44°10′53″N 06°27′39″E	Provence Alps	I/A-03.II-A	Alpes-de-Haute-Provence	FR
1425	Ebenstein	2123	348	47°36′21″N 15°01′42″E	Hochschwab	II/B-26.II-A	Styria	AT
1426	Zeiritzkampel	2120	559	47°29′29″N 14°43′34″E	Ennstal Alps	II/B-26.I-C	Styria	AT
	Monte Tinisa	2120	298	46°24′49″N 12°43′07″E	Carnic Alps	II/C-33.I-C	Udine	IT
1427	Spitzegel	2119	1045	46°39′18″N 13°24′38″E	Gailtal Alps	II/C-33.II-D	Carinthia	AT
1428	Wildseeloder	2119	338	47°25′55″N 12°31′55″E	Kitzbühel Alps	II/B-23.II-C	North Tyrol	AT
1429	Hundstein	2117	827	47°20′17″N 12°54′41″E	Salzburg Slate Alps	II/B-24.II-A	Salzburg	AT
1430	Roen	2116	753	46°21′38″N 11°11′31″E	Nonsberg Group	II/C-28.II-A	South Tyrol / Trentino	IT
1431	Almkogel	2116	375	47°37′10″N 14°05′35″E	Totes Gebirge	II/B-25.III-B	Styria / Upper Austria	AT
	Gsuchmauer	2116	295	47°32′56″N 14°40′03″E	Ennstal Alps	II/B-26.I-B	Styria	AT
1432	Les Monges	2115	769	44°15′47″N 06°11′41″E	Provence Alps	I/A-03.II-B	Hautes-Alpes	FR
1433	Montagne de Cordœil	2114	955	44°04′06″N 06°31′48″E	Provence Alps	I/A-03.I-A	Alpes-de-Haute-Provence	FR
	Pointe de Chalune	2113	295	46°10′49″N 06°35′00″E	Chablais Alps	I/B-08.III-C	Haute-Savoie	FR
1434	Sommet de Clot Ginoux	2112	754	44°17′47″N 06°12′46″E	Provence Alps	I/A-03.II-B	Hautes-Alpes	FR
1435	Le Chamossaire	2112	377	46°19′36″N 07°03′41″E	Vaud Alps	I/B-14.I-A	Vaud	CH
1436	Mirnock	2110	1343	46°45′32″N 13°42′56″E	Gurktal Alps	II/A-19.I-C	Carinthia	AT
1437	Trentski Pelc	2109	313	46°23′09″N 13°42′34″E	Julian Alps	II/C-34.I-C	Slovenia	SI
1438	Millstätter Alpe (P 2108)	2108	443	46°51′26″N 13°34′42″E	Nock Mountains	II/A-19.I-A	Carinthia	AT
1439	Testa di Comagna	2106	467	45°44′42″N 07°43′19″E	Monte Rosa Alps	I/B-09.III-B	Aosta Valley	IT
1440	Mondscheinspitze	2106	457	47°28′00″N 11°36′49″E	Karwendel	II/B-21.IV-B	North Tyrol	AT
1441	Les Cluots	2106	425	44°02′49″N 07°00′17″E	Maritime Alps	I/A-02.I-D	Alpes-Maritimes	FR
1442	Schluchberg	2106	364	46°52′00″N 08°20′02″E	Uri Alps	I/B-12.I-B	Nidwalden / Obwalden	CH
1443	Hochkogel	2105	800	47°32′20″N 14°48′55″E	Ennstal Alps	II/B-26.I-C	Styria	AT
1444	Schopfenspitz / Gros Brun	2104	537	46°37′21″N 07°15′02″E	Fribourg Prealps	I/B-14.I-B	Fribourg	CH
1445	Schönberg	2104	318	47°07′49″N 09°35′35″E	Rätikon	II/A-15.VIII-A	Liechtenstein	LI
1446	Mont Chalancha	2102	598	44°02′06″N 07°12′46″E	Maritime Alps	I/A-02.I-B	Alpes-Maritimes	FR
1447	Schafreuter	2102	562	47°30′33″N 11°29′15″E	Karwendel	II/B-21.IV-B	North Tyrol / Bavaria	AT/DE
1448	Pizzo Proman	2099	371	46°01′27″N 08°23′41″E	Ticino Alps	I/B-10.II-C	V-C-O	IT
1449	Zwölferkogel	2099	354	47°42′34″N 13°57′09″E	Totes Gebirge	II/B-25.III-A	Styria / Upper Austria	AT
1450	Simmering	2096	315	47°16′41″N 10°52′01″E	Mieminger Chain	II/B-21.III-A	North Tyrol	AT
1451	Himmeleck	2096	302	47°25′36″N 14°36′11″E	Seckau Tauern	II/A-18.IV-A	Styria	AT
1452	Damülser Mittagsspitze	2095	609	47°18′37″N 09°53′02″E	Bregenz Forest Mts	II/B-22.I-A	Vorarlberg	AT
1453	Schönberg / Wildenkogel	2093	495	47°42′45″N 13°47′37″E	Totes Gebirge	II/B-25.III-A	Styria	AT
1454	Mont Chauffé	2093	399	46°18′33″N 06°45′38″E	Chablais Alps	I/B-08.III-B	Haute-Savoie	FR
1455	Schrattenfluh (Hengst)	2092	776	46°50′03″N 07°57′28″E	Emmental Alps	I/B-14.III-A	Lucerne	CH
1456	Schatzbichl	2090	536	46°43′27″N 12°54′43″E	Gailtal Alps	II/C-33.II-C	Carinthia	AT
1457	Il Palone	2090	529	46°01′37″N 11°03′31″E	Garda Mountains	II/C-30.II-C	Trentino	IT
1458	Pointe d'Angolon	2090	430	46°08′17″N 06°43′51″E	Chablais Alps	I/B-08.III-A	Haute-Savoie	FR
1459	Diedamskopf	2090	303	47°20′47″N 10°01′32″E	Allgäu Alps	II/B-22.II-A	Vorarlberg	AT
1460	Itonskopf	2089	610	47°06′58″N 09°56′00″E	Verwall Alps	II/A-15.VI-C	Vorarlberg	AT
1461	Jôf di Miezegnot	2087	695	46°28′36″N 13°27′12″E	Julian Alps	II/C-34.I-A	Udine	IT
1462	Pic Grillon	2087	407	44°45′05″N 05°55′04″E	Dévoluy Mountains	I/A-06.I-A	Hautes-Alpes / Isère	FR
1463	Krottenkopf	2086	1156	47°32′42″N 11°11′36″E	Bavarian Prealps	II/B-22.IV-A	Bavaria	DE
1464	Montagne Durbonas	2086	393	44°36′40″N 05°45′34″E	Dévoluy Mountains	I/A-06.I-B	Hautes-Alpes	FR
1465	Mont de l'Arpille	2085	557	46°04′38″N 07°00′24″E	Mont Blanc massif	I/B-07.V-C	Valais	CH
1466	Seebergspitze	2085	529	47°27′58″N 11°40′47″E	Karwendel	II/B-21.IV-B	North Tyrol	AT
1467	Mont Aiguille	2085	465	44°50′31″N 05°33′09″E	Vercors Massif	I/A-06.III-A	Isère	FR
1468	Monte Zelo	2083	532	46°15′48″N 12°05′33″E	Dolomites – SE	II/C-31.II-B	Belluno	IT
1469	Zadnjiški Ozebnik	2083	450	46°22′10″N 13°46′56″E	Julian Alps	II/C-34.I-E	Slovenia	SI
	Krofička	2083	291	46°22′28″N 14°38′45″E	Kamnik Alps	II/C-35.II-B	Slovenia	SI
1470	Chamechaude	2082	1771	45°17′17″N 05°47′24″E	Chartreuse Mts	I/B-08.VI-B	Isère	FR
1471	Hochplatte	2082	967	47°33′08″N 10°50′33″E	Ammergau Alps	II/B-22.III-B	Bavaria	DE
1472	Trenchtling (Hochturm)	2081	515	47°32′04″N 15°00′29″E	Hochschwab	II/B-26.II-A	Styria	AT
1473	Breithorn	2081	375	47°12′41″N 09°54′51″E	Lechquellen Mts	II/B-21.II-A	Vorarlberg	AT
1474	Monte Altissimo di Nago	2079	653	45°48′37″N 10°53′20″E	Garda Mountains	II/C-30.II-C	Trentino	IT
1475	Ladinger Spitz	2079	435	46°51′12″N 14°39′03″E	Lavanttal Alps	II/A-19.II-C	Carinthia	AT
1476	Rinderberg	2079	371	46°30′19″N 07°21′25″E	Bernese Alps	I/B-14.II-A	Bern	CH
1477	Turnen	2079	343	46°37′40″N 07°29′33″E	Bernese Alps	I/B-14.II-A	Bern	CH
1478	Vorderunnütz	2078	591	47°30′53″N 11°44′20″E	Brandenberg Alps	II/B-21.V-A	North Tyrol	AT
1479	Klosterwappen	2076	1348	47°46′02″N 15°48′18″E	Rax-Schneeberg Group	II/B-26.II-C	Lower Austria	AT
1480	Cima del Cacciatore / Kamniti Lovec	2071	595	46°27′53″N 13°31′41″E	Julian Alps	II/C-34.I-A	Udine	IT
1481	Stadelstein	2070	418	47°29′23″N 14°51′25″E	Ennstal Alps	II/B-26.I-C	Styria	AT
1482	Monte Coppolo	2069	449	46°04′58″N 11°42′39″E	Fiemme Mountains	II/C-31.V-B	Trentino	IT
1483	Hirscheck	2068	313	47°37′39″N 14°07′23″E	Totes Gebirge	II/B-25.III-B	Styria / Upper Austria	AT
1484	Monte Resettum	2067	635	46°14′23″N 12°34′38″E	Carnic Prealps	II/C-33.III-B	Pordenone	IT
1485	Col Gentile	2067	340	46°27′58″N 12°48′20″E	Carnic Alps	II/C-33.I-C	Udine	IT
1486	Padauner Kogel	2066	475	47°02′34″N 11°30′27″E	Zillertal Alps	II/A-17.I-A	North Tyrol	AT
1487	Dosso Alto	2065	411	45°48′48″N 10°25′01″E	Brescia Prealps	II/C-30.I-B	Brescia	IT
1488	Creta Grauzaria	2065	375	46°28′03″N 13°09′45″E	Carnic Alps	II/C-33.I-D	Udine	IT
1489	Großer Woising	2064	312	47°42′58″N 13°54′14″E	Totes Gebirge	II/B-25.III-A	Styria / Upper Austria	AT
1490	Chateau Lebrun	2064	301	44°48′08″N 06°31′48″E	Massif des Écrins	I/A-05.III-C	Hautes-Alpes	FR
1491	Burgfeldstand	2063	508	46°43′20″N 07°47′41″E	Emmental Alps	I/B-14.II-C	Bern	CH
1492	Dent de Cons	2062	1155	45°43′47″N 06°21′06″E	Bauges	I/B-08.V-A	Savoie / Haute-Savoie	FR
1493	Raduha	2062	803	46°24′35″N 14°44′18″E	Kamnik Alps	II/C-35.II-C	Slovenia	SI
1494	Dent de Crolles	2062	690	45°18′30″N 05°51′25″E	Chartreuse Mts	I/B-08.VI-A	Isère	FR
1495	Monte Dosaip	2062	562	46°17′02″N 12°38′13″E	Carnic Prealps	II/C-33.III-B	Pordenone	IT
1496	Monte Agaro	2062	452	46°05′37″N 11°39′28″E	Fiemme Mountains	II/C-31.V-B	Trentino	IT
1497	Pic Melette	2062	392	44°37′37″N 06°00′53″E	Dévoluy Mountains	I/A-06.I-A	Hautes-Alpes	FR
1498	Begunjščica	2060	518	46°25′17″N 14°13′45″E	Karawanks	II/C-35.I-A	Slovenia	SI
1499	Monte Stivo	2059	489	45°55′14″N 10°57′49″E	Garda Mountains	II/C-30.II-C	Trentino	IT
1500	Monte Toff	2058	481	46°06′24″N 10°47′18″E	Brenta Dolomites	II/C-28.IV-A	Trentino	IT
1501	Oisternig / Ojstrnik	2052	620	46°33′56″N 13°30′00″E	Carnic Alps	II/C-33.I-B	Carinthia / Udine	AT/IT
1502	Mont Jocou	2051	594	44°43′27″N 05°38′51″E	Massif du Diois	I/A-06.III-A	Isère / Drôme	FR
1503	Sigriswiler Rothorn	2051	372	46°43′50″N 07°46′14″E	Emmental Alps	I/B-14.II-C	Bern	CH
1504	Mont Lachat de Chatillon	2050	322	45°57′35″N 06°28′36″E	Bornes Massif	I/B-08.IV-B	Haute-Savoie	FR
1505	Roc Cornafion	2049	420	45°03′48″N 05°36′09″E	Vercors Massif	I/A-06.III-A	Isère	FR
1506	Stoderzinken	2048	318	47°27′34″N 13°49′44″E	Dachstein Mts	II/B-25.I-C	Styria	AT
1507	Säuling	2047	695	47°32′06″N 10°45′21″E	Ammergau Alps	II/B-22.III-B	North Tyrol / Bavaria	AT/DE
1508	Hundsrügg	2047	414	46°33′24″N 07°18′19″E	Fribourg Prealps	I/B-14.I-B	Bern	CH
1509	Mont Colombier	2045	1095	45°38′39″N 06°07′11″E	Bauges	I/B-08.V-B	Savoie	FR
1510	Spielberghorn	2044	725	47°25′56″N 12°37′58″E	Kitzbühel Alps	II/B-23.II-C	North Tyrol / Salzburg	AT
1511	Monte Barone	2044	602	45°44′06″N 08°09′18″E	Biellese Alps	I/B-09.IV-A	Biella	IT
1512	Kanisfluh (Holenke)	2044	410	47°19′54″N 09°55′37″E	Bregenz Forest Mts	II/B-22.I-A	Vorarlberg	AT
1513	Güpfi	2043	381	46°47′46″N 08°11′43″E	Uri Alps	I/B-12.I-B	Obwalden	CH
1514	Rochers de Naye	2042	590	46°25′55″N 06°58′34″E	Vaud Alps	I/B-14.I-A	Vaud	CH
1515	Pointe de Bellevue	2042	355	46°15′27″N 06°53′15″E	Chablais Alps	I/B-08.III-B	Valais	CH
1516	Le Glandasse (Pié Ferré)	2041	403	44°44′14″N 05°28′17″E	Vercors Massif	I/A-06.III-A	Drôme	FR
1517	Fürstein	2040	481	46°53′44″N 08°04′11″E	Emmental Alps	I/B-14.III-A	Lucerne / Obwalden	CH
1518	Saldeiner Spitze	2036	340	47°23′56″N 10°31′56″E	Allgäu Alps	II/B-22.II-C	North Tyrol	AT
	Leobner	2036	297	47°29′39″N 14°39′00″E	Ennstal Alps	II/B-26.I-C	Styria	AT
1519	Tamischbachturm	2035	584	47°36′53″N 14°41′57″E	Ennstal Alps	II/B-26.I-B	Styria	AT
1520	Monte Curie	2035	468	46°35′44″N 12°36′49″E	Carnic Alps	II/C-33.I-A	Belluno	IT
1521	Griesmauerkogel	2034	357	47°33′04″N 14°59′01″E	Hochschwab	II/B-26.II-A	Styria	AT
1522	Tête Grosse	2032	330	44°19′53″N 06°16′26″E	Provence Alps	I/A-03.II-B	Alpes-de-Haute-Provence	FR
1523	Gamsfeld	2027	1070	47°37′23″N 13°28′52″E	Salzkammergut Mts	II/B-25.II-A	Salzburg	AT
1524	Grand Som	2026	887	45°22′16″N 05°48′47″E	Chartreuse Mts	I/B-08.VI-A	Isère	FR
1525	Fleischbank	2026	472	47°28′44″N 11°31′10″E	Karwendel	II/B-21.IV-B	North Tyrol	AT
1526	Pointe d'Aveneyre	2026	405	46°25′02″N 07°00′17″E	Vaud Alps	I/B-14.I-A	Vaud	CH
1527	Raut	2025	524	46°13′20″N 12°38′58″E	Carnic Prealps	II/C-33.III-B	Pordenone	IT
1528	Kosiak / Geißberg	2024	310	46°27′11″N 14°10′54″E	Karawanks	II/C-35.I-A	Carinthia	AT
1529	Mont Lachat	2023	1064	45°55′38″N 06°21′04″E	Bornes Massif	I/B-08.IV-B	Haute-Savoie	FR
1530	Schreckenspitze	2022	342	47°30′00″N 11°38′58″E	Karwendel	II/B-21.IV-B	North Tyrol	AT
1531	Monte Alben	2019	781	45°51′44″N 09°46′55″E	Bergamasque Prealps	II/C-29.II-B	Bergamo	IT
1532	Céüse	2016	1040	44°30′32″N 05°57′43″E	Bochaine	I/A-06.II-A	Hautes-Alpes	FR
1533	Monte Verena	2015	595	45°55′52″N 11°24′49″E	Vicentine Alps	II/C-32.I-A	Vicenza	IT
1534	Dent de Lys	2014	505	46°30′28″N 07°00′11″E	Fribourg Prealps	I/B-14.I-B	Fribourg	CH
1535	Montagne de l'Ubac	2010	448	44°15′40″N 06°24′50″E	Provence Alps	I/A-03.I-A	Alpes-de-Haute-Provence	FR
1536	Bäderhorn	2009	404	46°36′48″N 07°19′39″E	Fribourg Prealps	I/B-14.I-B	Bern	CH
1537	Heukuppe	2007	992	47°41′22″N 15°41′16″E	Rax-Schneeberg Group	II/B-26.II-C	Lower Austria / Styria	AT
1538	Corna Blacca	2006	327	45°47′29″N 10°22′50″E	Brescia Prealps	II/C-30.I-B	Brescia	IT
1539	Dristenkopf	2005	361	47°25′14″N 11°39′51″E	Karwendel	II/B-21.IV-A	North Tyrol	AT
1540	Montagne de Sous Dine	2004	579	46°00′14″N 06°19′43″E	Bornes Massif	I/B-08.IV-B	Haute-Savoie	FR
1541	Golz	2004	443	46°40′17″N 13°21′57″E	Gailtal Alps	II/C-33.II-E	Salzburg	AT
1542	Pizzo Ruscada	2004	330	46°10′39″N 08°35′34″E	Ticino Alps	I/B-10.II-B	Ticino	CH
1543	Brandstein	2003	446	47°36′03″N 14°58′58″E	Hochschwab	II/B-26.II-A	Styria	AT
1544	Moléson	2002	512	46°32′56″N 07°01′02″E	Fribourg Prealps	I/B-14.I-B	Fribourg	CH
1545	Vordere Kesselschneid	2001	603	47°36′24″N 12°16′39″E	Kaiser Mountains	II/B-21.VI-B	North Tyrol	AT
1546	Poludnig / Poludnik	1999	529	46°34′19″N 13°24′37″E	Carnic Alps	II/C-33.I-B	Carinthia / Udine	AT/IT
1547	Monte Venturosa	1999	471	45°55′47″N 09°36′57″E	Bergamo Alps	II/C-29.I-B	Bergamo	IT
1548	Pointe de Marcelly	1999	440	46°07′43″N 06°34′32″E	Chablais Alps	I/B-08.III-C	Haute-Savoie	FR
1549	Monte Scinauz	1999	369	46°31′56″N 13°21′50″E	Carnic Alps	II/C-33.I-B	Udine	IT
1550	Puy de Rent	1996	556	44°01′17″N 06°35′27″E	Maritime Alps	I/A-02.I-E	Alpes-de-Haute-Provence	FR
1551	Kitzbüheler Horn	1996	516	47°28′34″N 12°25′48″E	Kitzbühel Alps	II/B-23.II-C	North Tyrol	AT

== See also ==
- List of mountains of the Alps (2500–2999 m)
- List of Alpine three-thousanders
- List of Alpine four-thousanders
- List of Alpine peaks by prominence
- List of the highest mountains in Austria
- List of the highest mountains in Germany
- List of mountains in Slovenia
- List of mountains of Switzerland

== Sources ==
- Jonathan de Ferranti & Eberhard Jurgalski's map-checked ALPS TO R589m and rough, computer-generated EUROPE TO R150m lists
- Christian Thöni's list of 8875 summits in Switzerland
- Mark Trengrove and Clem Clements' list of German alps above 2000 m,
- Mark Trengrove's lists of several regions of the French Alps.
