= Verena (disambiguation) =

Verena refers to Saint Verena, a 3rd to 4th century saint venerated in Switzerland. It may also refer to:

== People ==
- Verena Altenberger (born 1987), Austrian actress
- Verena Becker (born 1952), West German terrorist
- Verena Bentele (born 1982), blind German Paralympic biathlete and cross-country skier
- Verena Butalikakis (1955–2018), German politician
- Verena Conzett (1861–1947), Swiss magazine publisher, labor activist, and women's rights activist
- Verena Diener (1949–2024), Swiss politician
- Verena Eberhardt (born 1994), Austrian racing cyclist
- Verena Hofer (born 2001), Italian luger
- Verena Holmes (1889–1964), English mechanical engineer and inventor
- Verena Huber-Dyson (1923–2016), Swiss-American mathematician
- Verena Hubertz (born 1987), German politician
- Verena Keller (actress) (born 1945), Swiss actress and writer
- Verena Keller (singer) (1942–2025), German operatic mezzosoprano
- Verena Wagner Lafferentz (1920–2019), granddaughter of composer Richard Wagner
- Verena Nussbaum (born 1970), Austrian politician
- Verena Rehm (born 1984), German backup singer and pianist of the Eurodance dance group Groove Coverage
- Verena Sailer (born 1985), German sprinter
- Verena Schäffer (born 1986), German politician
- Vreni Schneider (born 1964), Swiss alpine skier
- Verena von Strenge (born 1975), dancer and singer with the German band Dune
- Verena Stuffer (born 1984), Italian alpine skier
- Verena von Weymarn (born 1943), German retired medical officer and first woman general in German military history

== Fictional characters ==
- Verena Cardoni, a federal police officer in O Mecanismo
- Verena Tarrant, the protagonist in Henry James' novel The Bostonians

== Other uses ==
- Monte Verena, a mountain in Italy
- St. Verena, a monastic church of Rot an der Rot Abbey

== See also ==
- Varina (disambiguation)
- Vreneli (gold coin)
