= Mont Charvin =

Mont Charvin can refer to:

- Mont Charvin (Aravis), a mountain in Savoie and Haute-Savoie, France
- Mont Charvin (Maurienne), a mountain in Maurienne, Savoie, France
