= List of Alpine two-thousanders =

List of Alpine two-thousanders may refer to:

- List of mountains of the Alps (2500–2999 m)
- List of mountains of the Alps (2000–2499 m)
