= Varina =

Varina may refer to:

== People ==
- Varina Davis (1826–1906), first and only First Lady of the Confederate States of America
- Varina Anne Davis (1864–1898), American author, daughter of Jefferson and Varina Davis
- Varina Tjon-A-Ten (born 1952), Dutch politician

== Places in the United States ==
- Varina, Iowa, a city
- Varina, North Carolina, a constituent town merged in 1963 to form Fuquay-Varina, North Carolina
- Varina, Virginia, a magisterial district in the easternmost portion of Henrico County, Virginia
- Varina Farms, a plantation established by John Rolfe on the James River

== Other uses ==
- Varina (moth), a genus of moths of the family Noctuidae
- Varina High School, Henrico County, Virginia
- USCS Varina, a United States Coast Survey schooner from 1854–1875
- Varina, a 2018 novel by Charles Frazier

== See also ==
- Verena (disambiguation)
- Verina (died 484), Empress of the Byzantine Empire, consort of Leo I
- Verina Morton Jones (1865–1943), African-American physician, suffragist and clubwoman
- Veriña, a district in the municipality of Gijón / Xixón, Asturias, Spain
- Varinia, Spartacus's love interest in the 1960 film Spartacus
