= Himmeleck =

Coordinates: 47°32′N 10°07′E

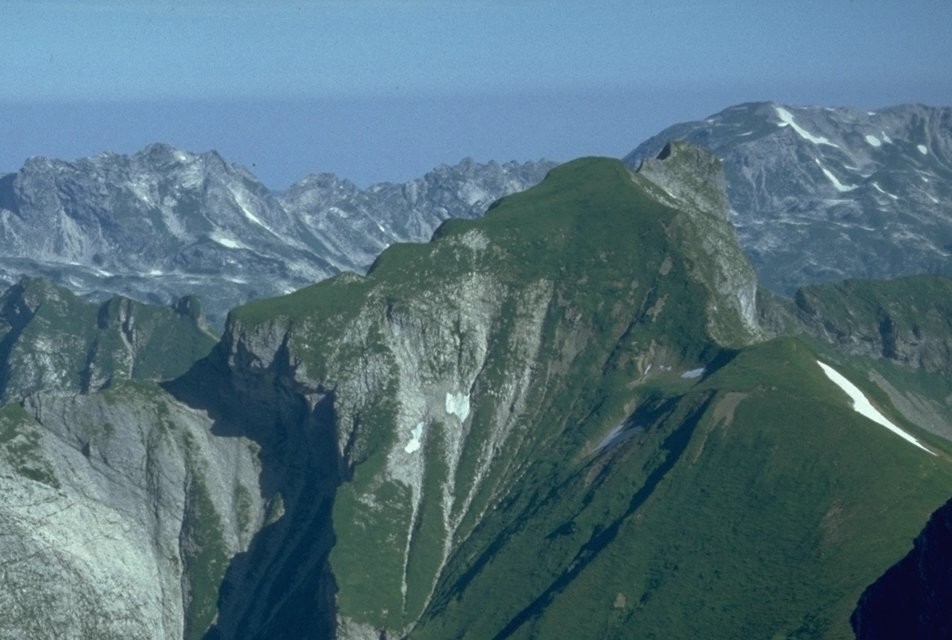
- View of Himmeleck (right foreground) among other mountain tops

Highest point
- Elevation: 2,145 m (7,037 ft)

Geography
- Location: Bavaria, Germany

Himmeleck is a mountain of Bavaria, Germany.
