= Monte Stivo =

Mountain in Italy

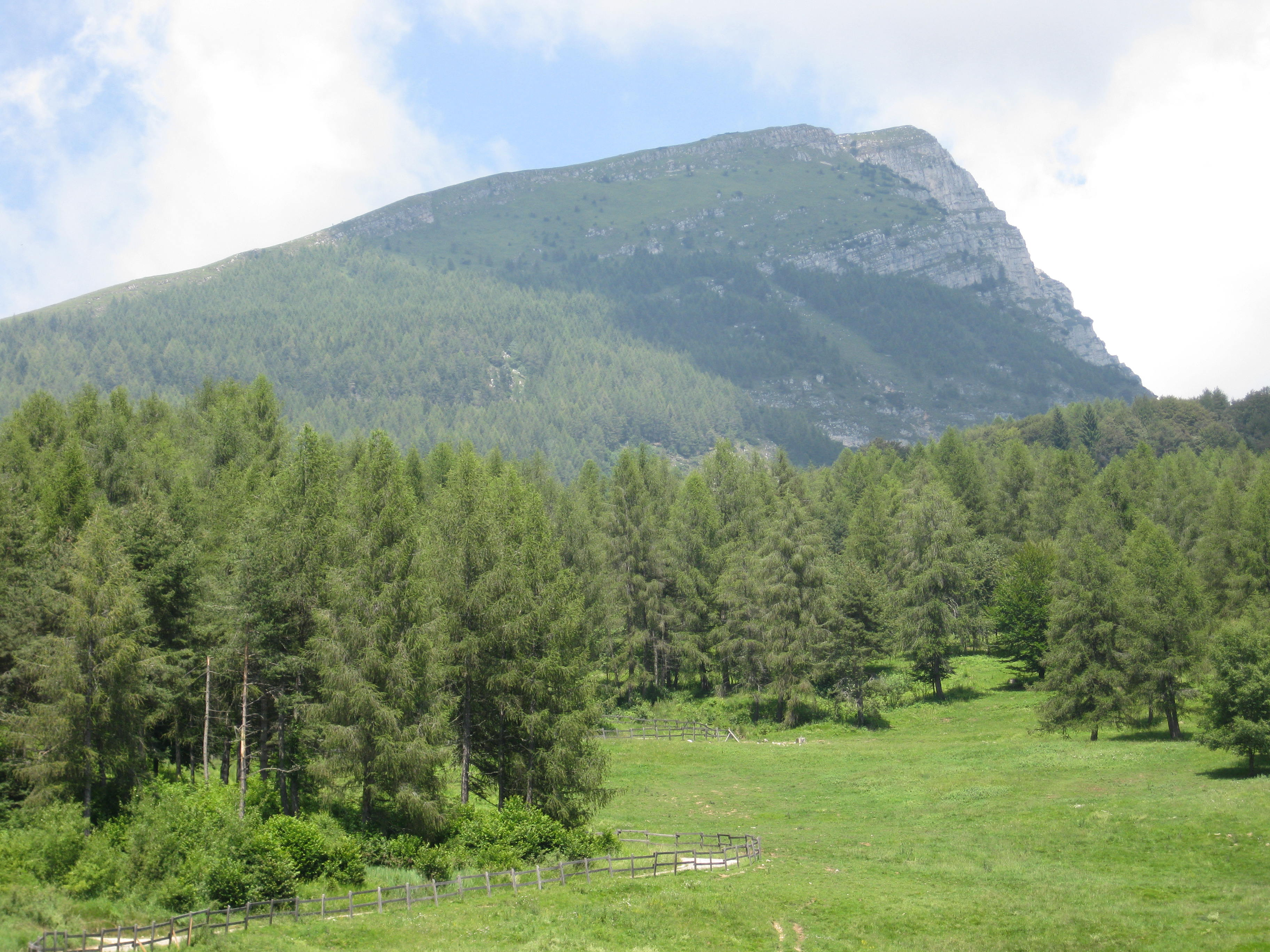
- Monte Stivo, view from the road between Passo S. Barbara and alp le Prese.

Highest point
- Elevation: 2,059 m (6,755 ft)
- Prominence: 490 m (1,610 ft)
- Coordinates: 45°55′16″N 10°57′45″E

Geography
- Location within Alps
- Location: Lake Garda, Italy
- Parent range: Garda Mountains

Monte Stivo is a 2,059 m mountain near Lake Garda, close to the cities of Arco and Riva del Garda in Italy.
