= Monte Pezza (Belluno) =

Mountain in Italy

Monte Pezza is a mountain located in the Province of Belluno in northern Italy. The mountain is part of the Marmolada Group located in the Dolomites. Monte Pezza reaches a height of 2405 meters (7890.42 feet). The nearest livable location would be the commune of Limana, Italy. The mountain is located at the Longitude of 46.24.21 N and Latitude of 11.55.14 E.
