= Monte Padrio =

Mountain in Italy

Coordinates: 46°11′12″N 10°13′39″E

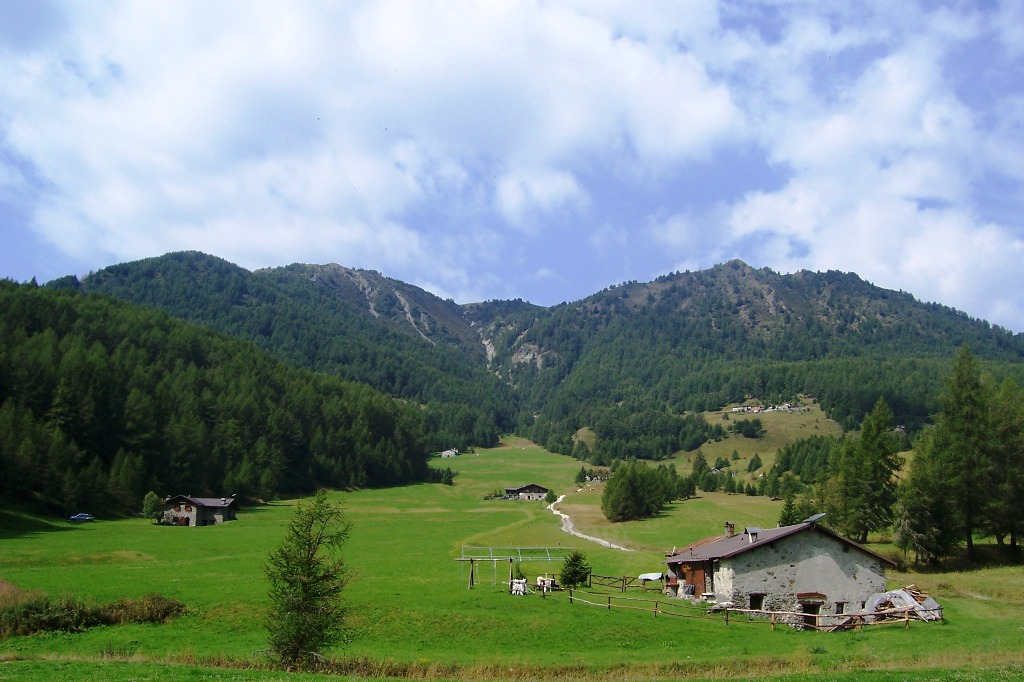

Highest point
- Elevation: 2,153 m (7,064 ft)

Geography
- Location: Lombardy, Italy

Monte Padrio is a mountain of Lombardy, Italy. It has an elevation of 2,153 metres. It is located between the Val Camonica and the Valtellina, in the towns of Tirano and Corteno Golgi. It is visible where the road from Edolo rises to the Aprica Pass, and can be reached through the road from Tirano. Monte Padrio is known for its bicycle, cross-country skiing, and hiking trails.

A refuge near the top of the mountain hosts a winery, gift store, and sandwich shop.

As a tectonic feature, its summit is divided by the Insubric Line, a part of the Periadriatic Seam.
