= Mont Chauffé =

Mountain in Haute-Savoie, France

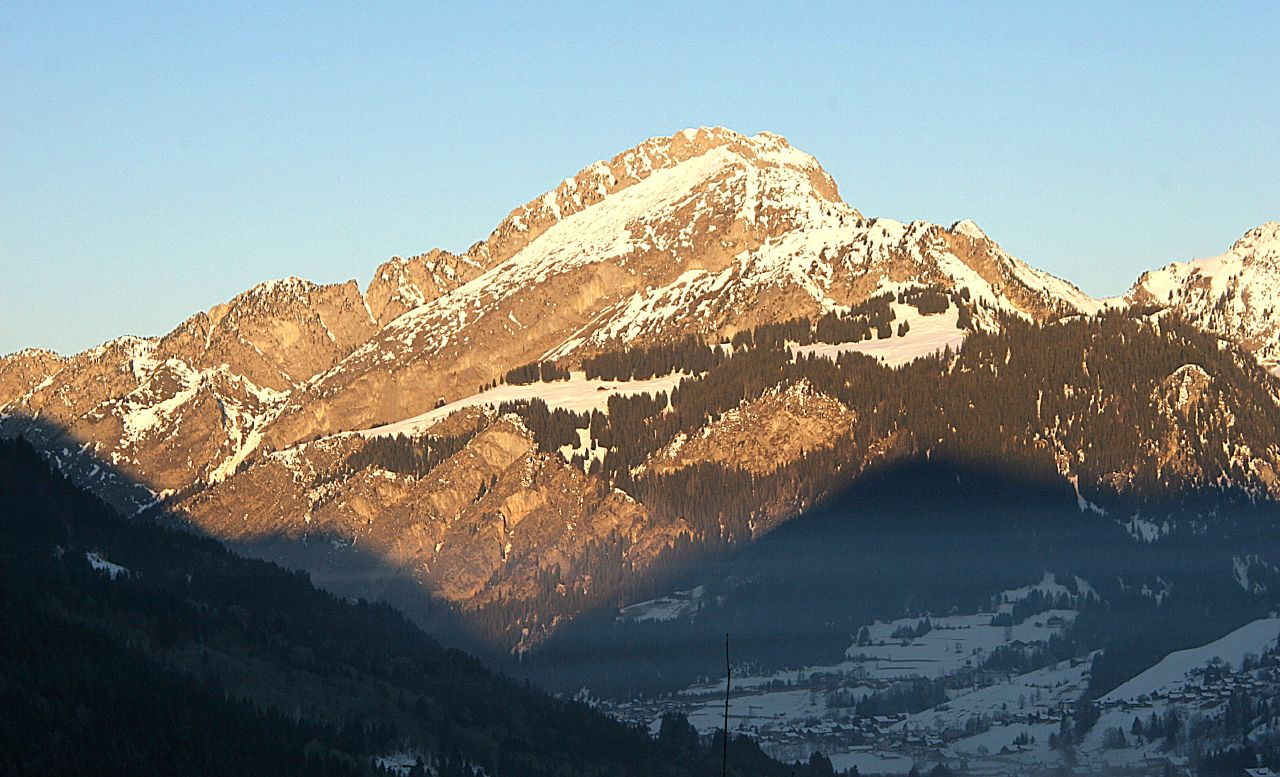

Highest point
- Elevation: 2,093 m (6,867 ft)
- Coordinates: 46°18′34″N 06°45′38″E

Geography
- Location within France
- Location: Haute-Savoie, France
- Parent range: Chablais Alps

Mont Chauffé (French pronunciation: [mɔ̃ ʃofe]; 2,093 m) is a mountain in the Chablais Alps in Haute-Savoie, France.
