= Schönberg (Liechtenstein) =

Mountain in Liechtenstein

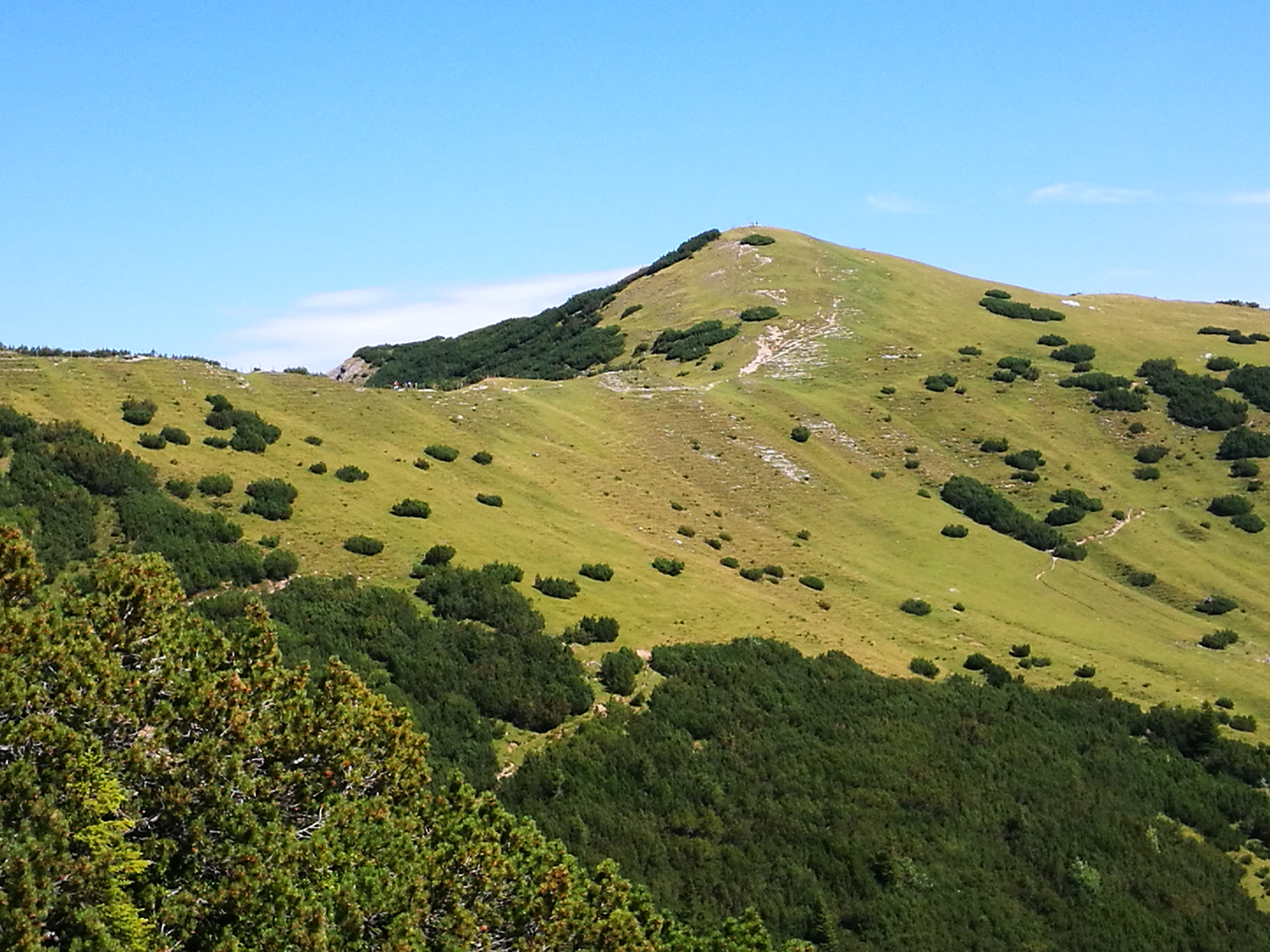
- Schönberg

Highest point
- Elevation: 2,104 m (6,903 ft)
- Coordinates: 47°07′49.3″N 9°35′34.6″E

Geography
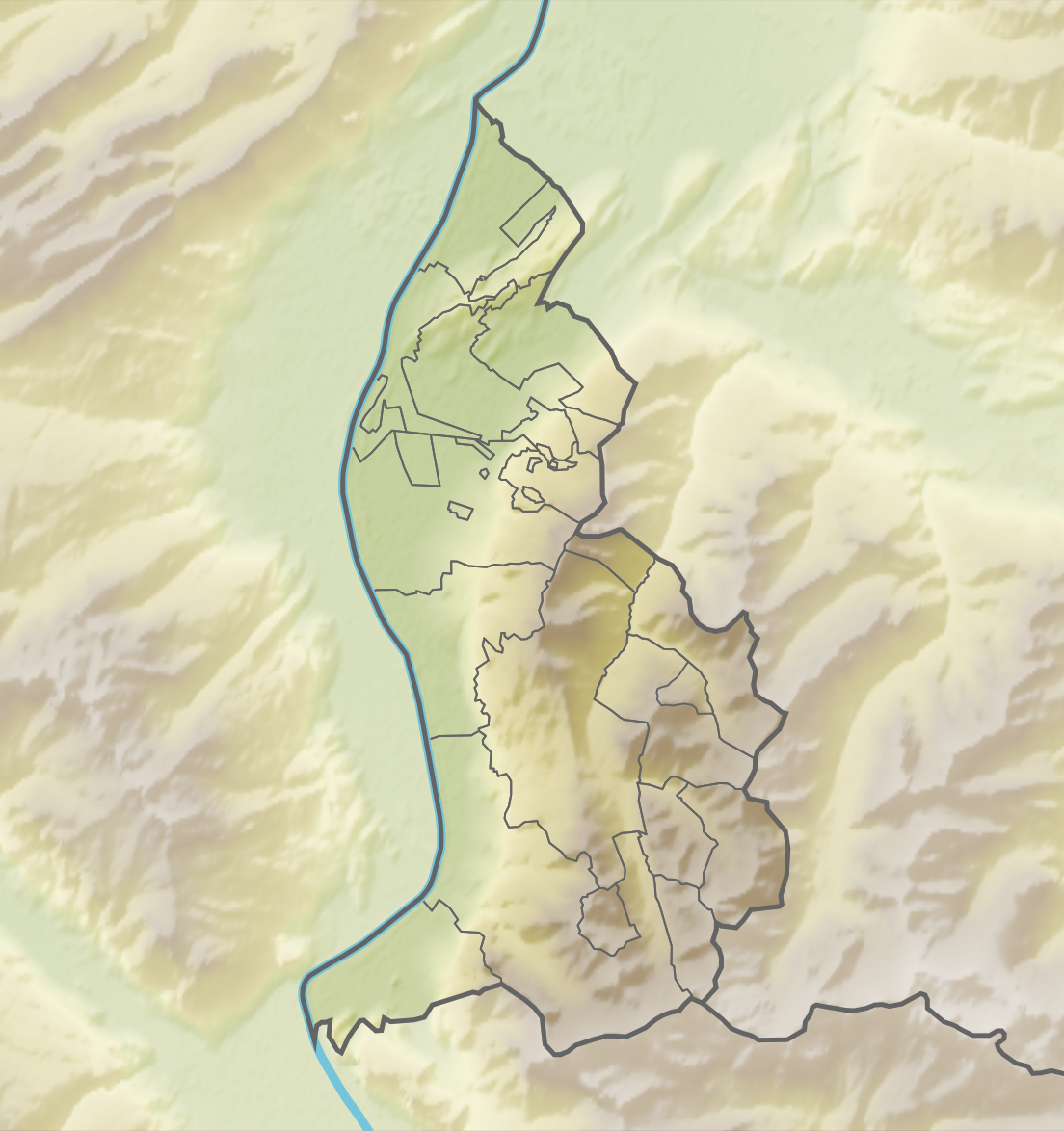
- Location within Liechtenstein
- Location: Location in Liechtenstein
- Parent range: Rätikon, Alps

Schönberg (German pronunciation: [ˈʃøːnbɛʁk]) is a mountain in Liechtenstein in the Rätikon range of the Eastern Alps north-east of the village of Steg, with a height of 2,104 metres (6,903 ft).
