= Cima d'Oltro =

Mountain in Italy

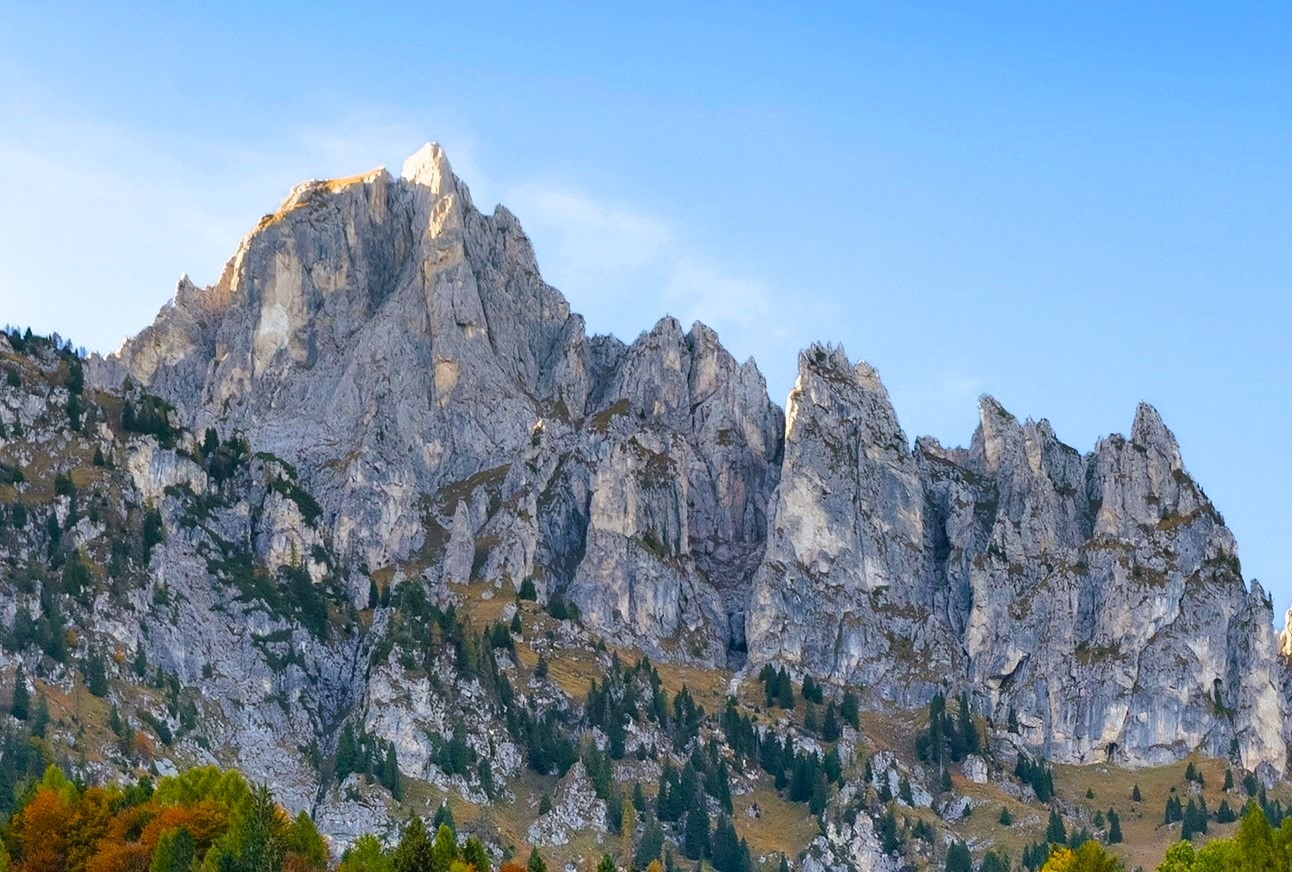
- Southeast aspect

Highest point
- Elevation: 2,396 m (7,861 ft)
- Prominence: 305 m (1,001 ft)
- Parent peak: Vezzana
- Isolation: 1.167 km (0.725 mi)
- Coordinates: 46°13′15″N 11°54′25″E

Geography
- Location within Italy
- Country: Italy
- Region: Trentino-Alto Adige/Südtirol
- Protected area: Paneveggio-Pale di San Martino Natural Park
- Parent range: Dolomites; Pale di San Martino
- Topo map: Tabacco Maps Pale di San Martino

Geology
- Rock age: Triassic
- Rock type: Dolomite

Climbing
- First ascent: 1892

Cima d'Oltro is a mountain in the Trentino-Alto Adige/Südtirol region of northern Italy.

== Description ==
Cima d'Oltro is a 2,396-meter-elevation (7,861-foot) summit in the Pale di San Martino group of the Dolomites. Set in the province of Trentino, the peak is located seven kilometers (4.35 miles) northeast of Primiero San Martino di Castrozza and within Paneveggio-Pale di San Martino Natural Park, a UNESCO World Heritage Site. Precipitation runoff from the mountain's west slope drains into Torrente Canali which is a tributary of the Cismon, whereas the east slope drains into the headwaters of Torrente Mis which is a tributary of the Piave. Topographic relief is significant as the summit rises 1,100 meters (3,609 feet) above the Canali Valley in 1.25 kilometers (0.77 mile), and 1,300 meters (4,265 feet) above the Mis Valley in two kilometers (1.24 miles). The nearest higher neighbor is Cima Sforcelloni, 1.167 kilometers (0.7 mile) to the northeast. The first ascent of Cima d'Oltro was made on July 23, 1892, by Demeter Diamantidi, Peter Kotter, and Giuseppe Zecchini via the southeast slope. The north-northeast ridge was first climbed on June 16, 1897, by Luigi Bernard and Oscar Schuster.

== Climate ==
Based on the Köppen climate classification, Cima d'Oltro is located in an alpine climate zone with long, cold winters, and short, mild summers. Weather systems are forced upward by the mountains (orographic lift), causing moisture to drop in the form of rain and snow. The months of June through September offer the most favorable weather for climbing or visiting this area.

== Gallery ==
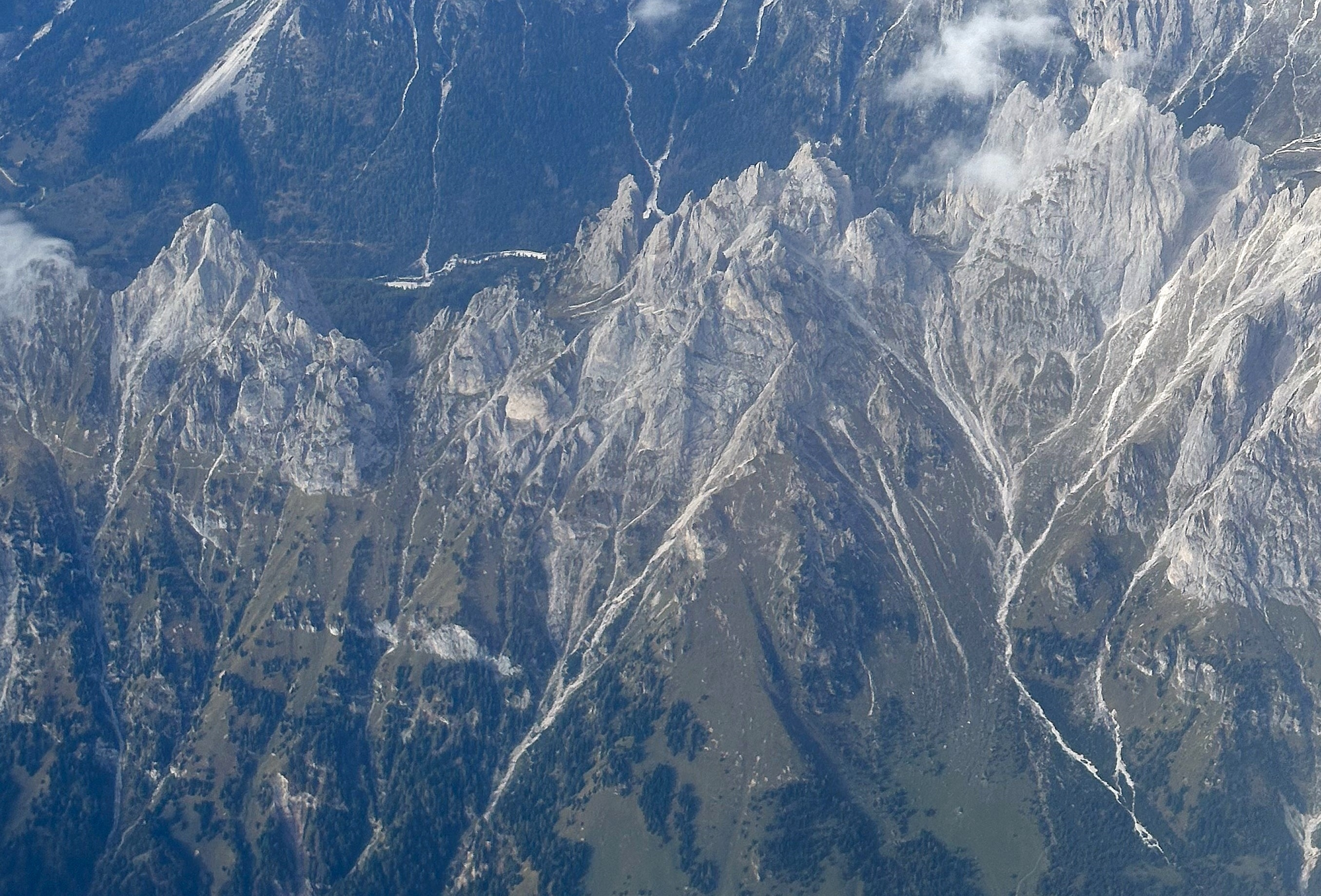
Cima d'Oltro (left) viewed from airliner.
(Sass d'Ortiga in upper right).

== See also ==
- Southern Limestone Alps
