= Monte Fioraro =

Mountain in Lombardy, Italy

Highest point
- Elevation: 2,431 m (7,976 ft)
- Prominence: 332 m (1,089 ft)
- Coordinates: 46°03′35″N 9°38′32″E

Geography
- Location: Lombardy, Italy
- Parent range: Orobic Alps

Monte Fioraro, also known as Monte Azzarini, is a mountain of Lombardy, Italy, with an elevation of 2,431 metres (7,976 ft). It is located in the Orobic Alps, between the provinces of Bergamo and Sondrio, in the municipalities of Averara, Tartano and Albaredo per San Marco.

The mountain divides the Valtellina, to the north, from the Val Brembana, to the south. It is known as Fioraro in the province of Bergamo and as Azzarini in the Valtellina; the latter name derives from the Lombard word laresìn, which means larch.

It lies entirely within the territory of the Bergamasque Alps Regional Park and the Valtellina Orobic Alps Regional Park. Its peak can be reached on a hiking path starting from Passo San Marco.
