= Les Grands Moulins =

Mountain in the French Alps

- Location within Alps

Highest point
- Elevation: 2,495 m (8,186 ft)
- Coordinates: 45.406273°N 6.199023°E

Geography
- Location: Alps

Climbing
- Easiest route: South face

Les Grands Moulins is a mountain in Savoie department in the French Alps. Les Grands Moulins can be climbed by hiking the trail on South face of the mountain.
