= Grand Arc =

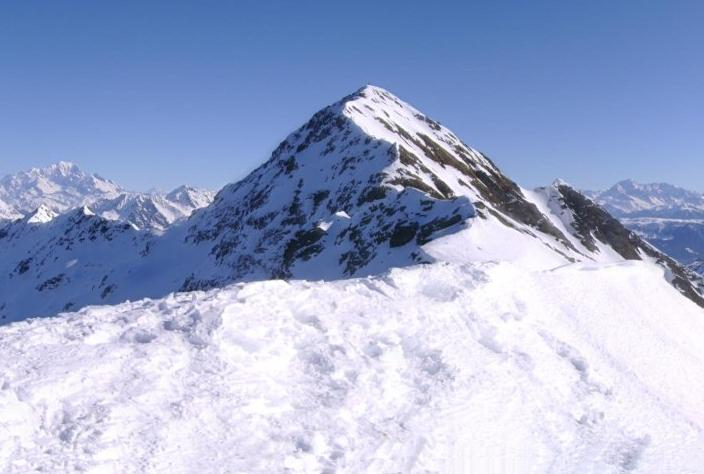
- Le Grand Arc

Highest point
- Elevation: 2,484 m (8,150 ft)
- Prominence: 693 m (2,274 ft)
- Isolation: 7.66 km (4.76 mi)
- Coordinates: 45°33′59″N 06°21′53″E

Geography
- Location within France
- Location: Savoie, France
- Parent range: Vanoise Massif

Grand Arc is a mountain of Savoie, France. It lies in the Massif de la Vanoise range. It has an elevation of 2,484 metres above sea level.
