= Scheiblingstein =

Austrian mountain

Coordinates: 47.652942°N 14.423612°E

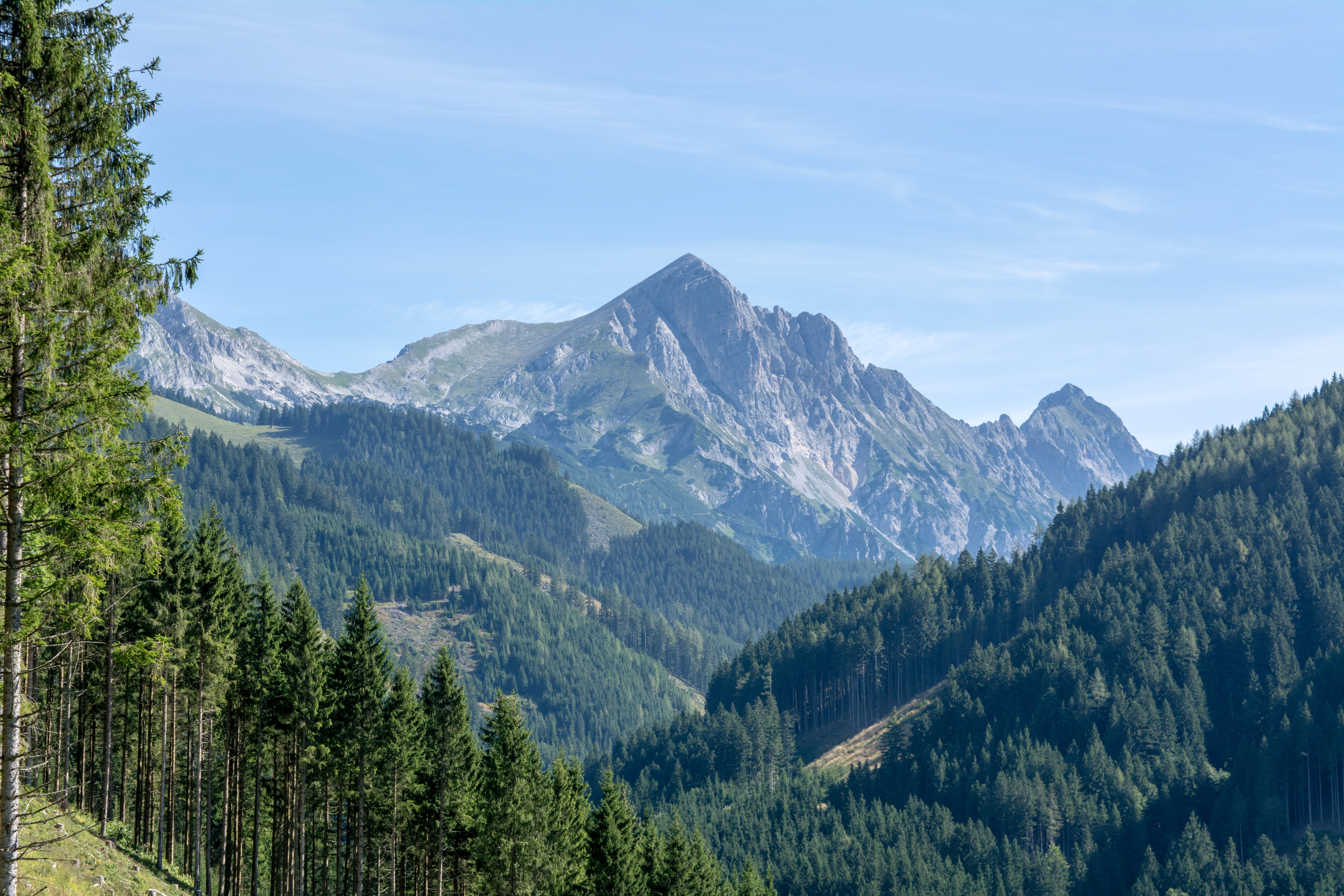
Viem of Scheiblingstein Kreuzmauer mountain tops

Scheiblingstein is a mountain in Styria, Austria at an elevation of 2197m high. It is part of the Haller Mauern.
