= Rotgschirr =

Mountain in Austria

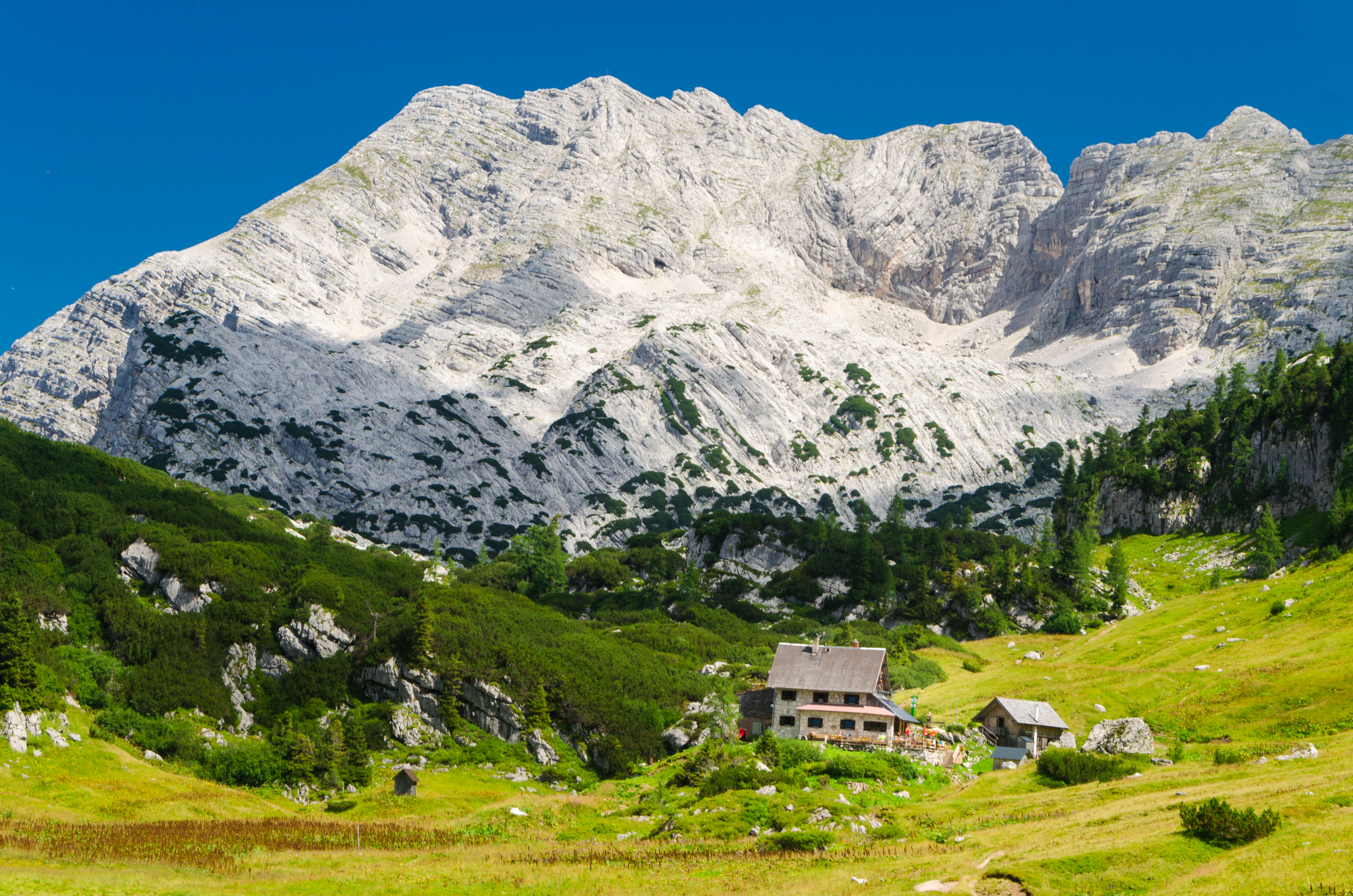
- Southwest aspect

Highest point
- Elevation: 2,270 m (7,448 ft)
- Prominence: 377 m (1,237 ft)
- Parent peak: Großer Priel
- Isolation: 2.25 km (1.40 mi)
- Coordinates: 47°42′06″N 13°59′45″E

Geography
- Location within Austria Location within Alps
- Interactive map of Rotgschirr
- Country: Austria
- State: Styria / Upper Austria
- Parent range: Northern Limestone Alps; Totes Gebirge
- Topo map: Tabacco 50 Totes Gebirge – Ausseerland

Geology
- Rock age: Triassic
- Rock type: Limestone

Rotgschirr is a mountain on the common border between the states of Styria and Upper Austria in Austria.

== Description ==
Rotgschirr is a 2,270-meter-elevation (7,448-foot) summit in the Totes Gebirge which is a subrange of the Northern Limestone Alps. The mountain is located 23 kilometers (14.3 miles) northwest of the municipality of Liezen and 19 kilometers (11.8 miles) northeast of the town of Bad Aussee. Precipitation runoff from the mountain's slopes drains north into tributaries of the Alm and south into tributaries of the Traun. Topographic relief is significant as the summit rises 1,470 meters (4,823 feet) above the northwest slope in 1.5 kilometers (0.93 mile) from the valley. The nearest higher mountain is Feuertalberg, 2.65 kilometers (1.65 miles) to the southeast. Rotgschirr is composed of Dachstein Formation limestone of Triassic age.

== Climate ==
Based on the Köppen climate classification, Rotgschirr is located in an alpine climate zone with long, cold winters, and short, mild summers. Weather systems are forced upwards by the mountains (orographic lift), causing moisture to drop in the form of rain and snow. The months of June, July, and August offer the most favorable weather for visiting or climbing this mountain.

== Gallery ==
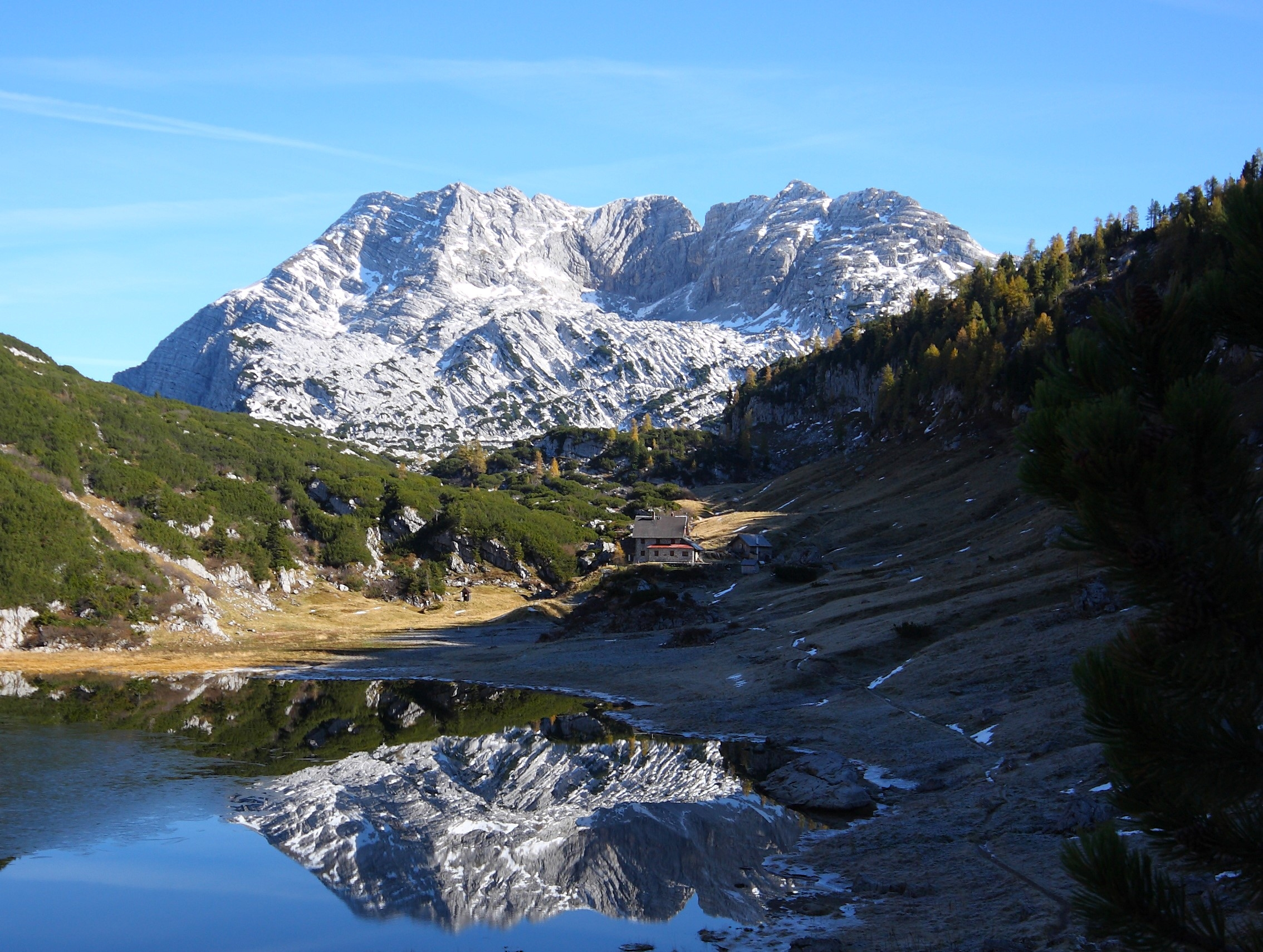
Southwest aspect

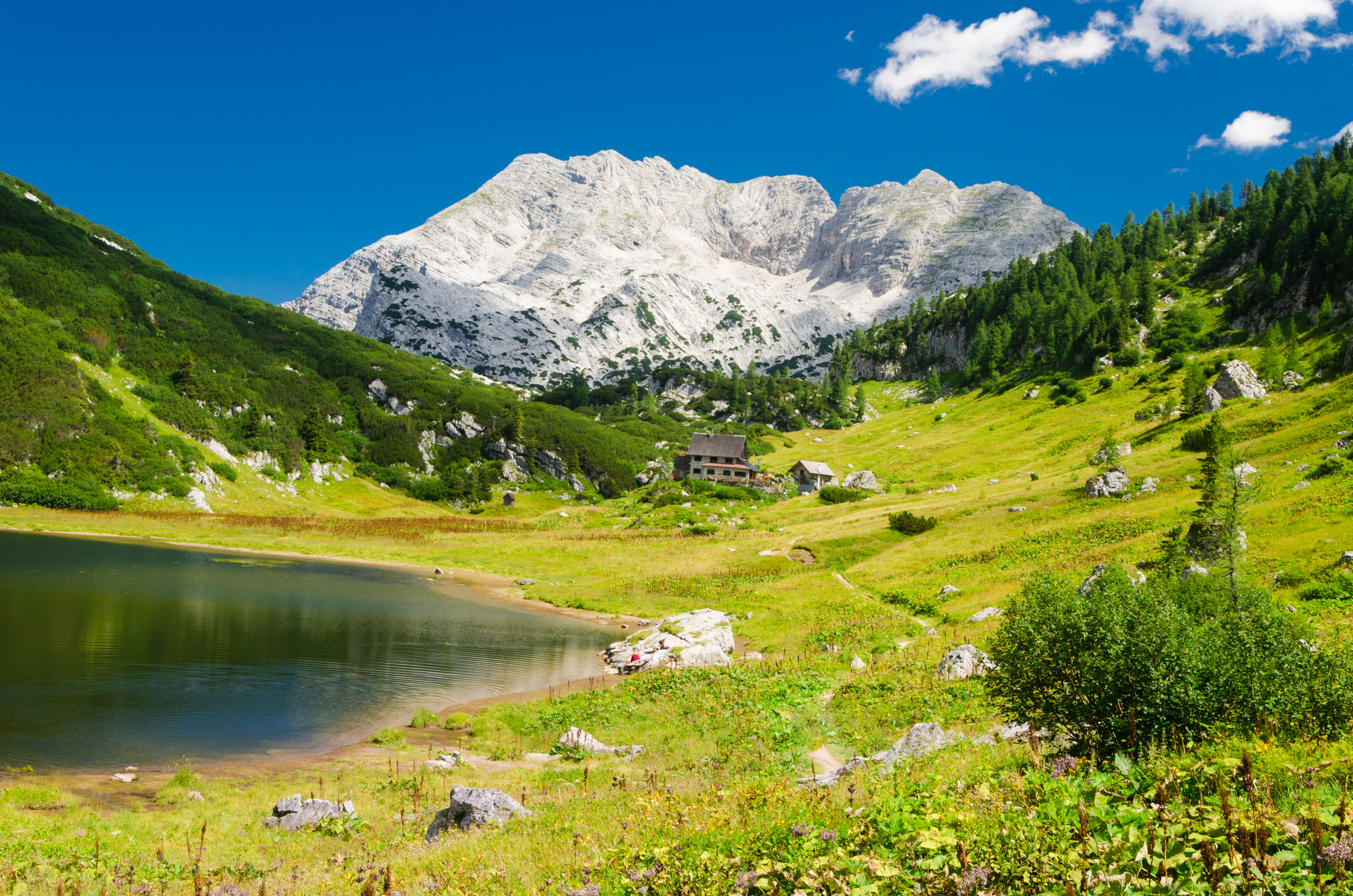
Southwest aspect, from Elmsee Lake

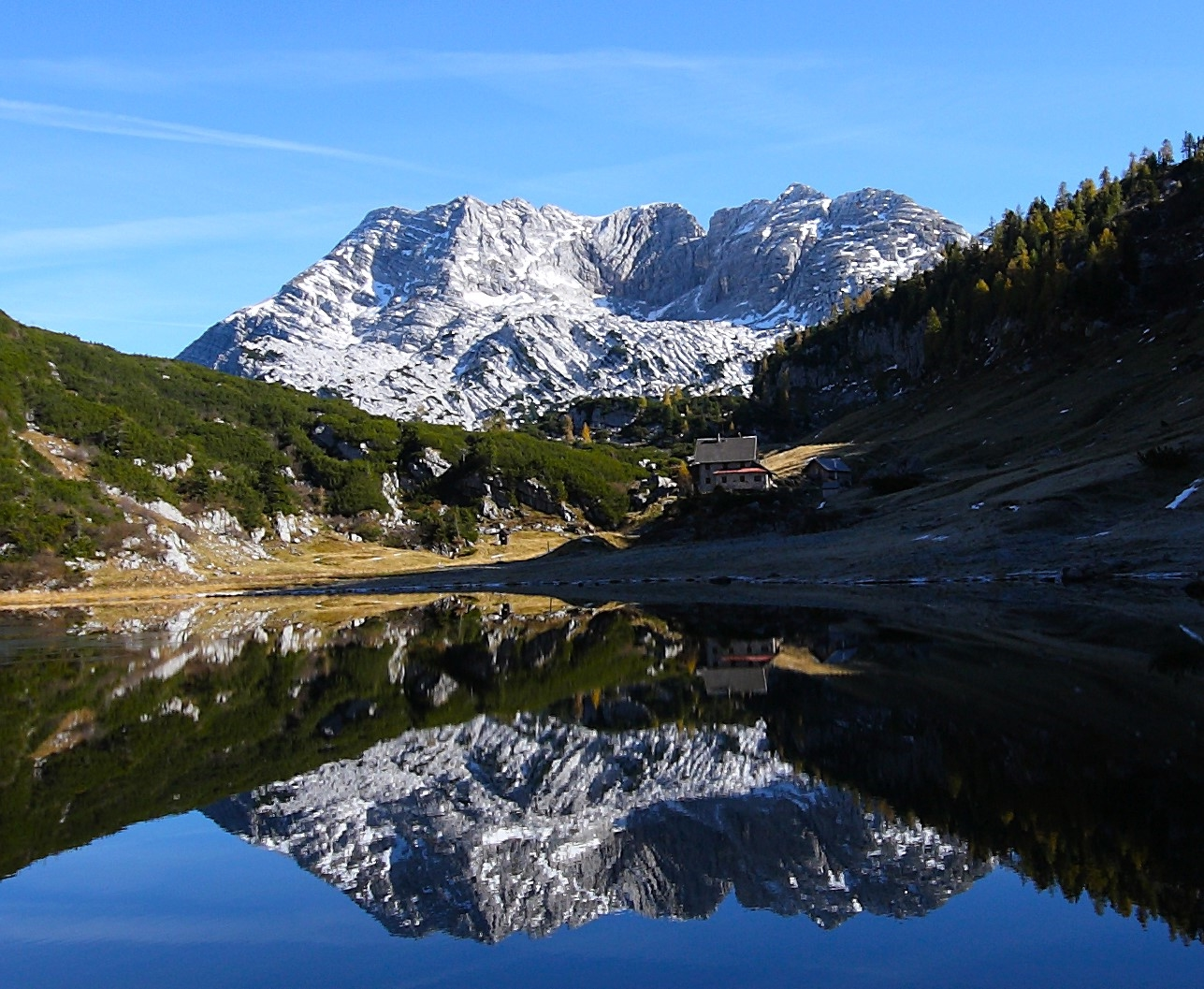
Southwest aspect reflected in Elmsee Lake

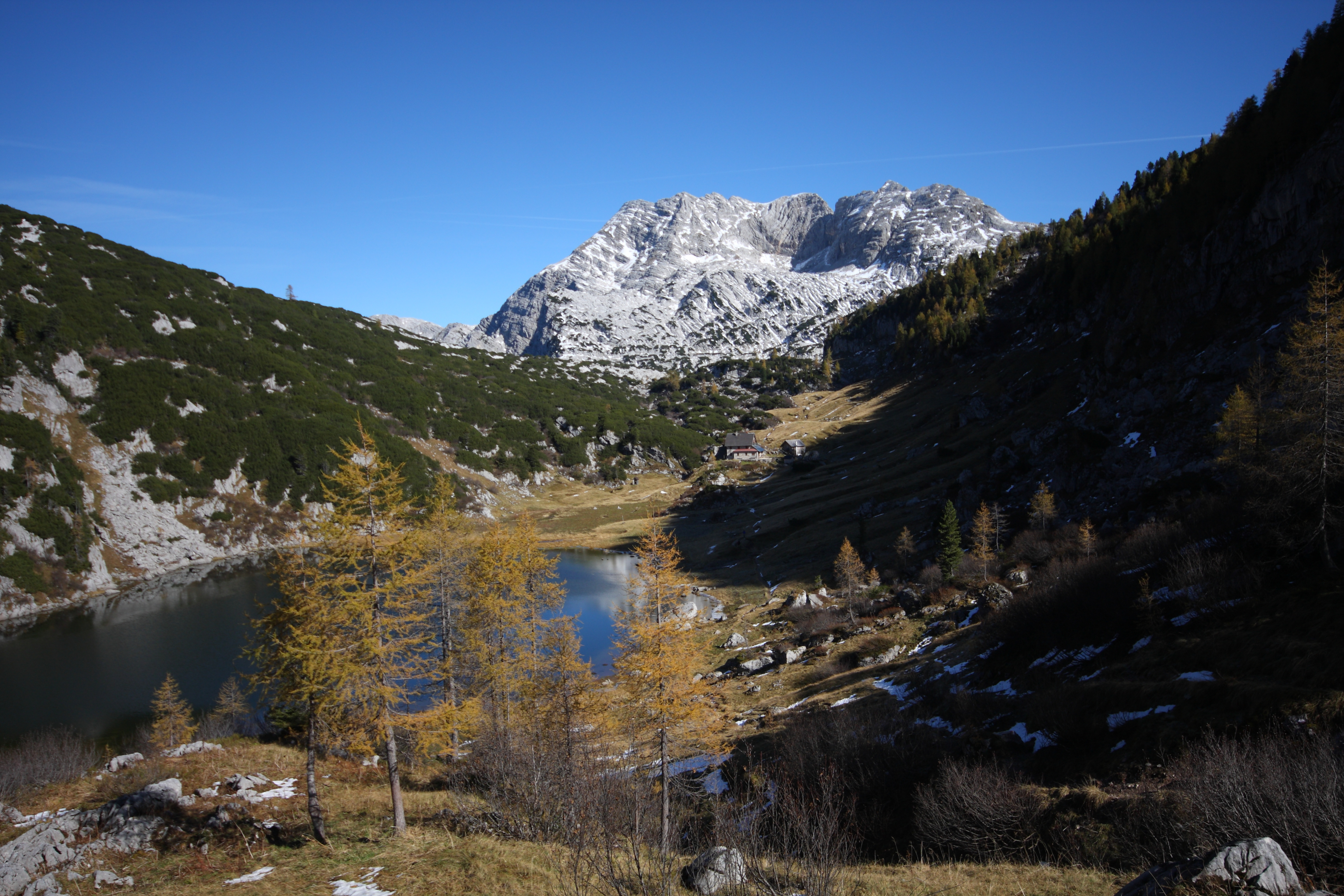
Southwest aspect, with Elmsee Lake

== See also ==
- Geography of the Alps
