= Monte Ferrante =

Mountain in Italy

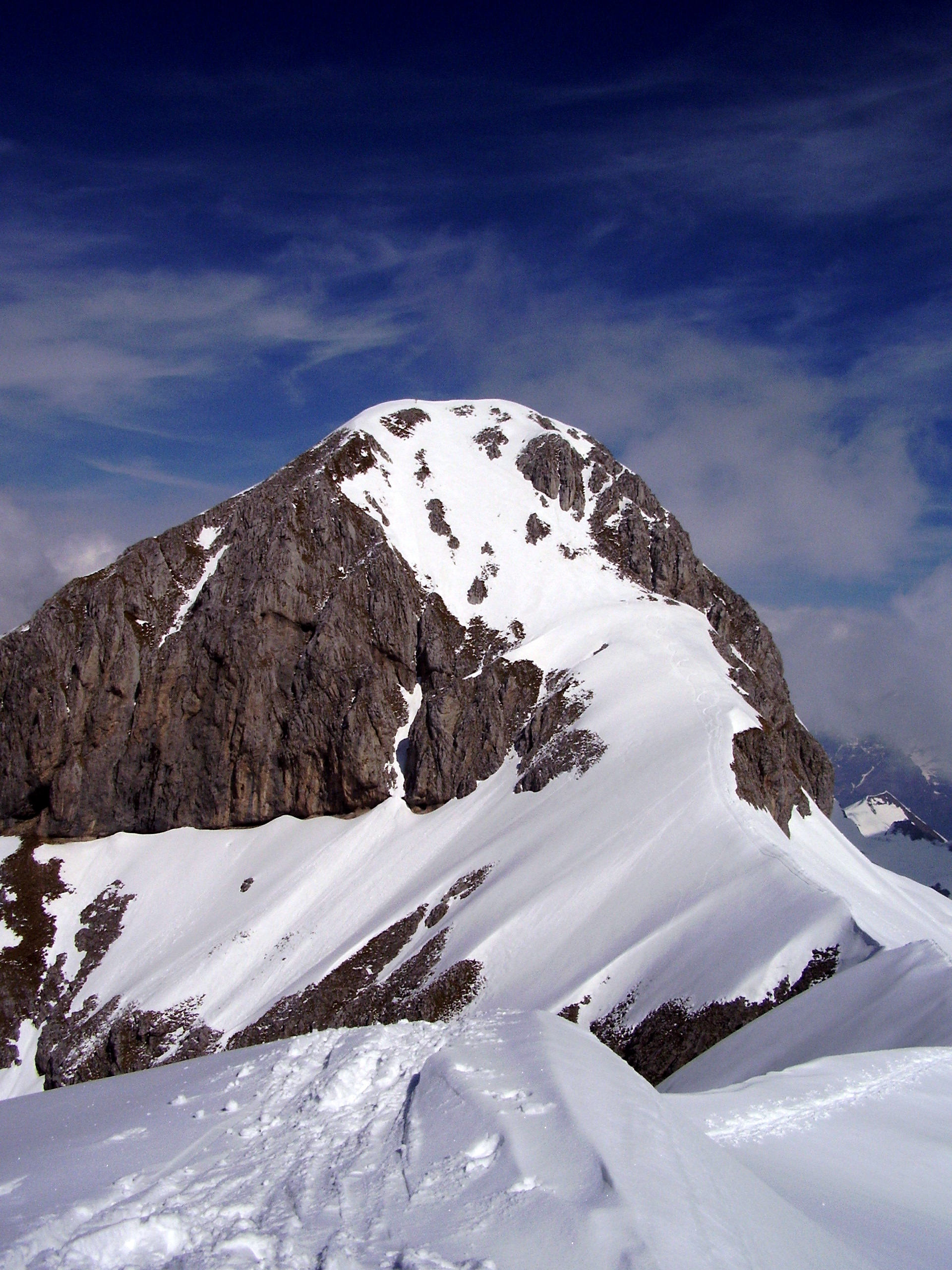
- Monte Ferrante

Highest point
- Elevation: 2,409 m (7,904 ft)
- Coordinates: 45°58′29″N 10°01′44″E

Geography
- Location within Alps
- Location: Lombardy, Italy
- Parent range: Bergamo Alps

Monte Ferrante (2,409 m) is a mountain of Lombardy, Italy. It is located within the Bergamo Alps and lies between the comunes of Vilminore di Scalve and Oltressenda Alta.
