= Golz =

Golz is a surname. Notable people with the surname include:

- Marianne Golz (1895–1943), Austrian opera singer and World War II resistance member
- Richard Golz (born 1968), German football goalkeeper
- Rolf Gölz (born 1962), German cyclist
- Werner Golz (1933–1974), German chess player
