= Monte Verena =

Mountain in Italy

Coordinates: 45°55′51″N 11°24′51″E

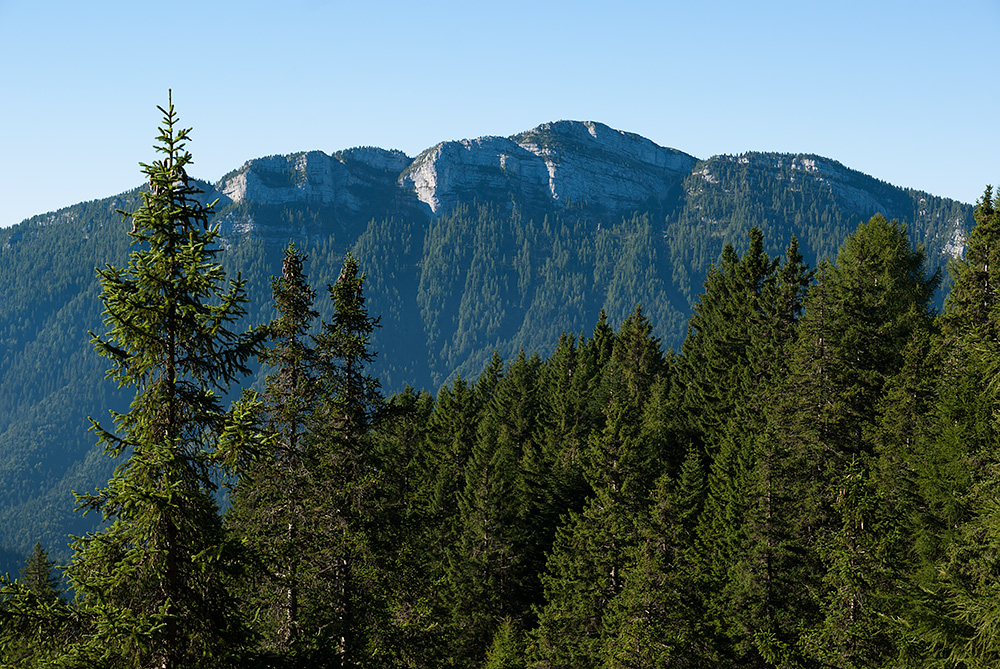
- The northern slope of the Verena.

Highest point
- Elevation: 2,015 m (6,611 ft)
- Prominence: 595 m (1,952 ft)

Geography
- Location: Veneto, Italy

Monte Verena is a mountain of the Veneto, Italy. It has an elevation of 2,015 metres (6,611 ft). It is located in the Sette Comuni Plateau group, in the Venetian Prealps.

It is a popular ski resort, having 3 ski lifts. The mountain is also a place of historical significance: at the summit of the mountain stands Forte Verena, a defensive structure from World War I built from 1910 to 1914.
