= Mont Charvin (Maurienne) =

Mountain in Savoie, France

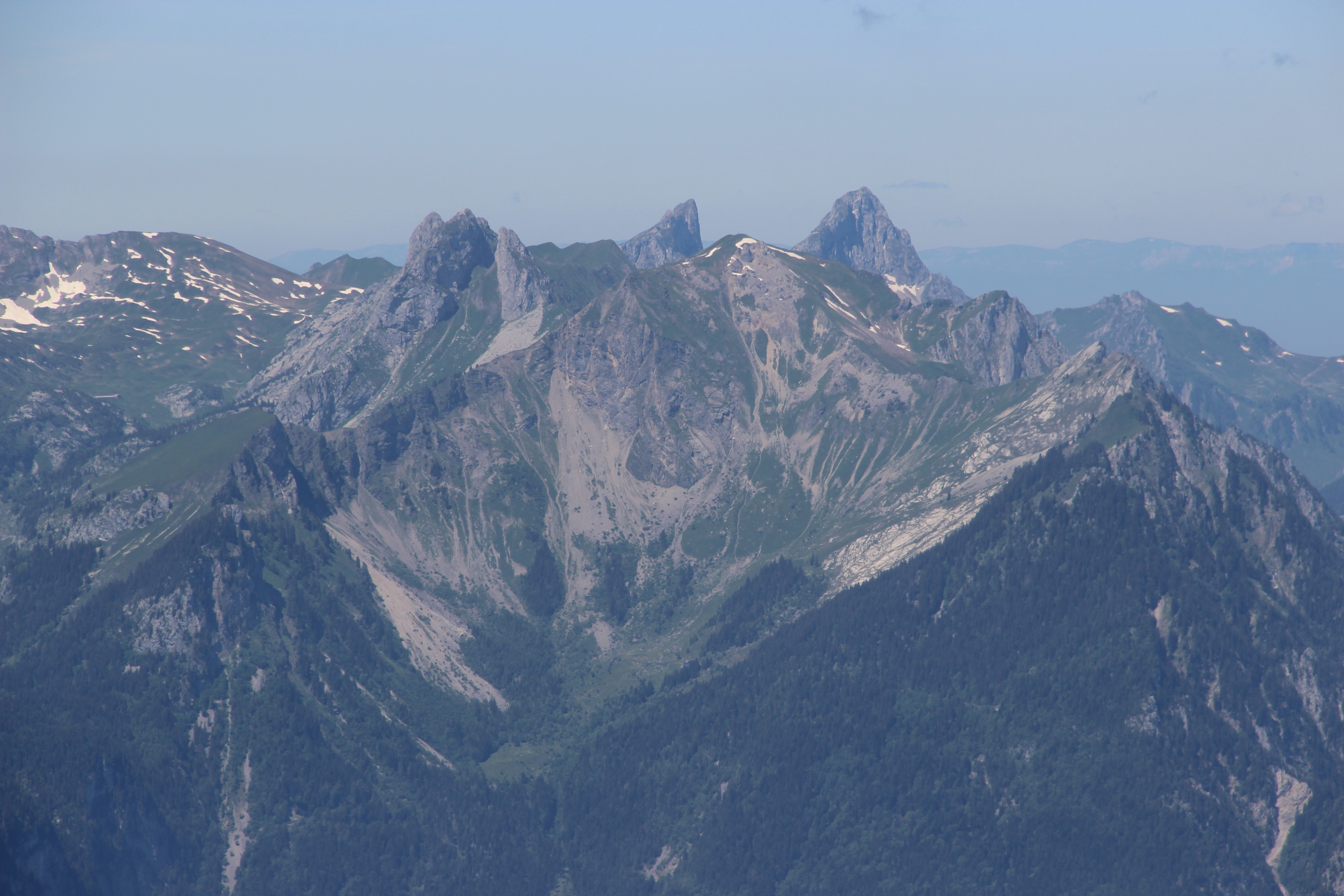

Highest point
- Elevation: 2,207 m (7,241 ft)
- Coordinates: 45°13′02″N 06°17′05″E

Geography
- Location within France
- Location: Savoie, France
- Parent range: Arves Massif

Mont Charvin (French pronunciation: [mɔ̃ ʃaʁvɛ̃]) (2,207 m) is a mountain in the Arves Massif in Savoie, France.
