= Gössenberg =

- Former municipality
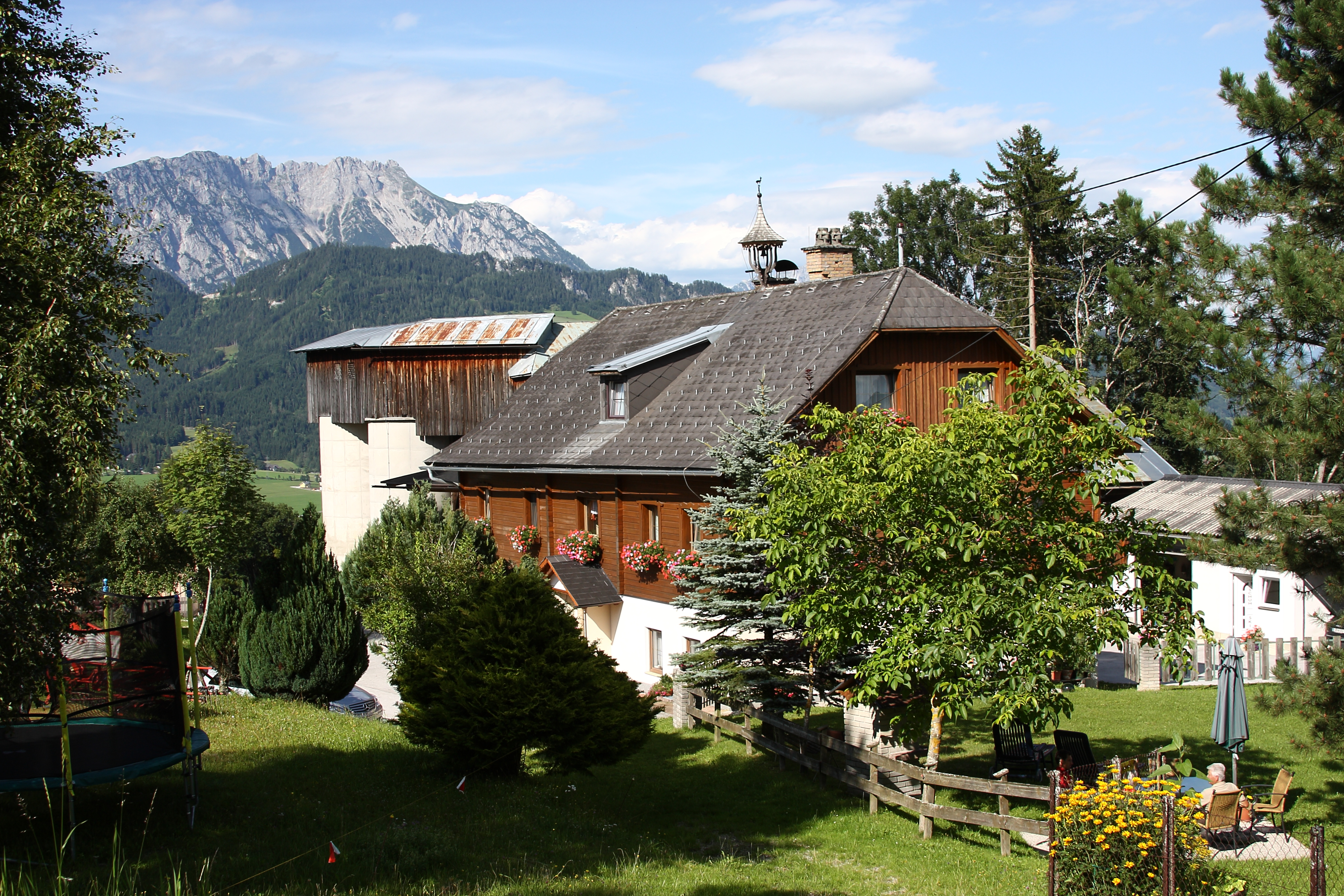
- Farmhouse in Gössenberg

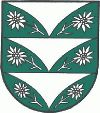
- Coat of arms

- Location within Austria
- Coordinates: 47°25′00″N 13°49′00″E
- Country: Austria
- State: Styria
- District: Liezen

Area
  - Total: 31.91 km^{2} (12.32 sq mi)
- Elevation: 950 m (3,120 ft)

Population (1 January 2016)
  - Total: 285
  - Density: 8.93/km^{2} (23.1/sq mi)
- Time zone: UTC+1 (CET)
  - Summer (DST): UTC+2 (CEST)
- Postal code: 8966
- Area code: 03686
- Vehicle registration: GB
- Website: www.goessenberg.at

Gössenberg is a former municipality in the district of Liezen in Styria, Austria. Since the 2015 Styria municipal structural reform, it is part of the municipality Aich.
