= Stein (Lassing) =

Coordinates: 47°32′N 14°13′E

Stein (German pronunciation: [ʃtaɪn]) is a village in the Austrian state of Styria in the administrative district of Liezen. It is located in the valley of the river Enns, and is part of the municipality Lassing.
