= Niederöblarn =

- Former municipality
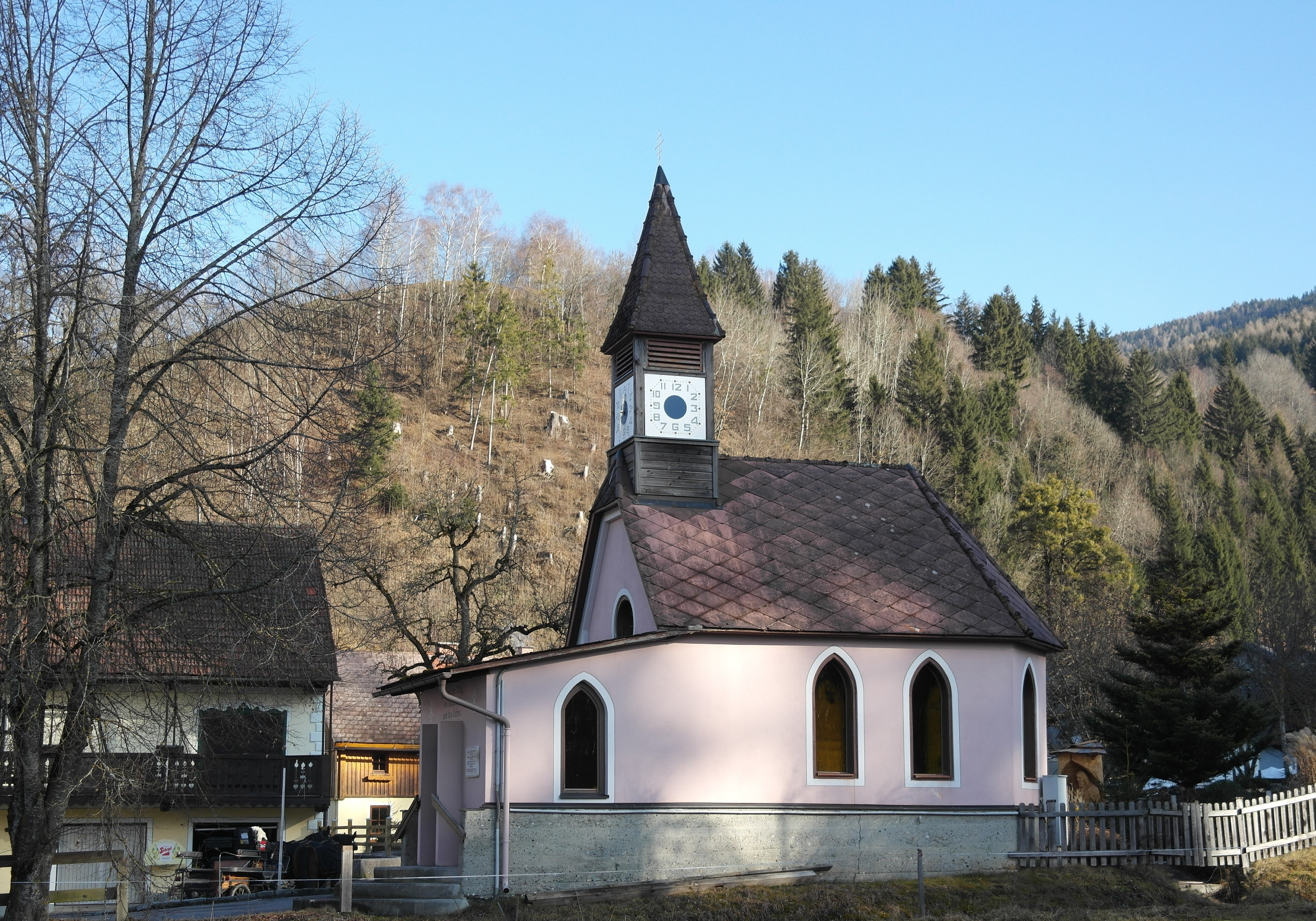
- Chapel in Niederöblarn

- Location within Austria
- Coordinates: 47°28′12″N 14°06′00″E
- Country: Austria
- State: Styria
- District: Liezen

Area
  - Total: 20.95 km^{2} (8.09 sq mi)
- Elevation: 678 m (2,224 ft)

Population (1 January 2016)
  - Total: 598
  - Density: 28.5/km^{2} (73.9/sq mi)
- Time zone: UTC+1 (CET)
  - Summer (DST): UTC+2 (CEST)
- Postal code: 8960
- Area code: 03684
- Vehicle registration: GB
- Website: www.niederoeblarn.at

Niederöblarn is a former municipality in the district of Liezen in Styria, Austria. Since the 2015 Styria municipal structural reform, it is part of the municipality Öblarn.
