= Weißenbach an der Enns =

- Former municipality
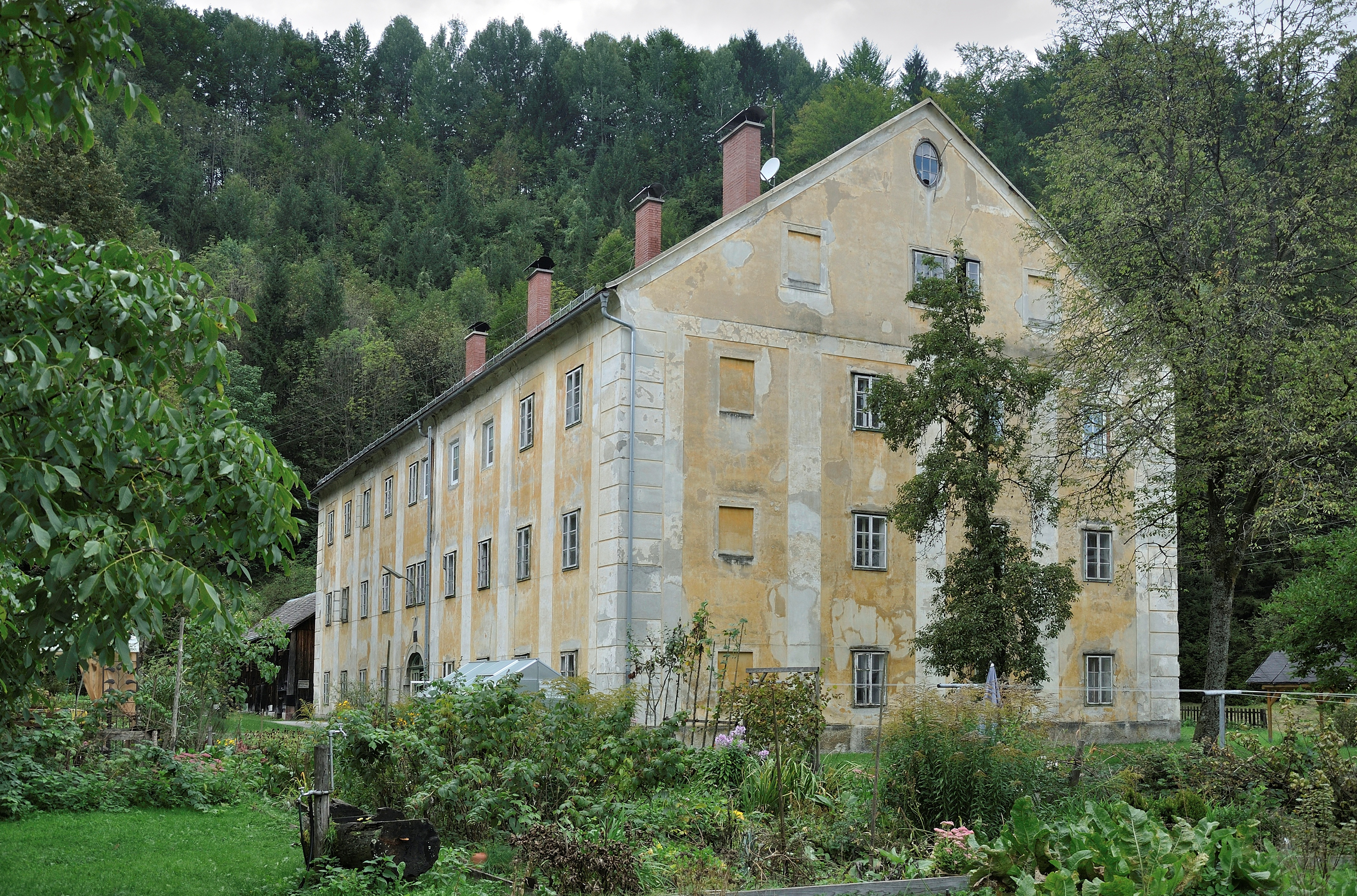
- Granary in Weißenbach an der Enns

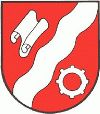
- Coat of arms

- Location within Austria
- Coordinates: 47°42′21″N 14°37′47″E
- Country: Austria
- State: Styria
- District: Liezen

Area
  - Total: 35.82 km^{2} (13.83 sq mi)
- Elevation: 654 m (2,146 ft)

Population (1 January 2016)
  - Total: 483
  - Density: 13.5/km^{2} (34.9/sq mi)
- Time zone: UTC+1 (CET)
  - Summer (DST): UTC+2 (CEST)
- Postal code: 8932
- Area code: 03632
- Vehicle registration: LI
- Website: www.weissenbach-enns.steiermark.at

Weißenbach an der Enns is a former municipality in the district of Liezen in the Austrian state of Styria. Since the 2015 Styria municipal structural reform, it is part of the municipality Sankt Gallen.

== Population ==
Historical population
Year	Pop.	±%
1869	962	—
1880	879	−8.6%
1890	971	+10.5%
1900	1,043	+7.4%
1910	1,115	+6.9%
1923	1,269	+13.8%
1934	1,268	−0.1%
1939	1,177	−7.2%
1951	1,250	+6.2%
1961	1,158	−7.4%
1971	1,004	−13.3%
1981	752	−25.1%
1991	646	−14.1%
2001	566	−12.4%
2011	501	−11.5%
