= Franz Murer =

Austrian-born SS functionary (1912–1994)

- Born: 24 January 1912; Sankt Georgen ob Murau, Styria, Cisleithania, Austro-Hungarian Empire
- Died: 5 January 1994 (aged 81) Gaishorn am See, Austria
- Allegiance: Nazi Germany
- Branch: Schutzstaffel
- Service years: 1938-1945
- Rank: SS-Oberscharführer

Franz Murer (24 January 1912 – 5 January 1994) was an Austrian SS NCO (SS-Oberscharführer). Also known as the "Butcher of Vilnius", he created and ruled the Vilna Ghetto until July 1943, shortly before its liquidation.

== Early life ==
Murer was born in Sankt Georgen ob Murau, Austria, in 1912, and joined the NSDAP at the age of 26. He trained with the Hitler Youth in Nuremberg before being transferred to Vilnius, where between 1941 and 1943 he was the deputy of Territorial Commissioner (Gebietskommissar) Hans Christian Hingst in charge of "Jewish affairs". He was known as a sadist who showed special cruelty towards the Jews. Vilnius, which was known as "the Jerusalem of Lithuania" before the war, had a Jewish population of about 80,000. After the war around 250 Jews were living there. The rest had been murdered by the SS and Murer was instrumental in organizing these killings. On 1 July 1943 Murer was replaced by Gestapo Oberscharführer Bruno Kittel, who was brought in to liquidate the ghetto.

== Post war ==
After the war, Murer moved to Steiermark in Austria. Near his residence in Admont there was a camp for displaced persons. In 1947 one of these DPs recognized Murer and British forces arrested Murer. In December 1948 he was deported to the Soviet Union since Vilnius had been under Soviet jurisdiction. He was found guilty of having murdered Soviet citizens and sentenced to 25 years of hard labor. As a part of the Austrian State Treaty, he was released in 1955 and thus returned to Austria. Simon Wiesenthal managed to get him prosecuted again in 1963. The trial that took place in Graz, Austria, lasted for a week, but ended with Murer's acquittal. The trial was the subject of the 2018 film Murer – Anatomie eines Prozesses (Murer – Anatomy of a Trial).

Murer died in Gaishorn am See, Austria, in 1994.

In 1980, Israeli intelligence had made plans to assassinate Murer. The Mossad planned to raid his farm and shoot him with his own rifle. The never-implemented plan became known in 2018 after former Mossad agent Yossi Chen (Chinitz) published documents on the operation. The Mossad had also planned to assassinate Ernst Lerch, who had had a major role in Operation Reinhard. Neither assassinations were carried out since the new Mossad chief, Yitzhak Hofi, feared that attacks on Austrian soil would endanger relations.
