= Treglwang =

- Former municipality
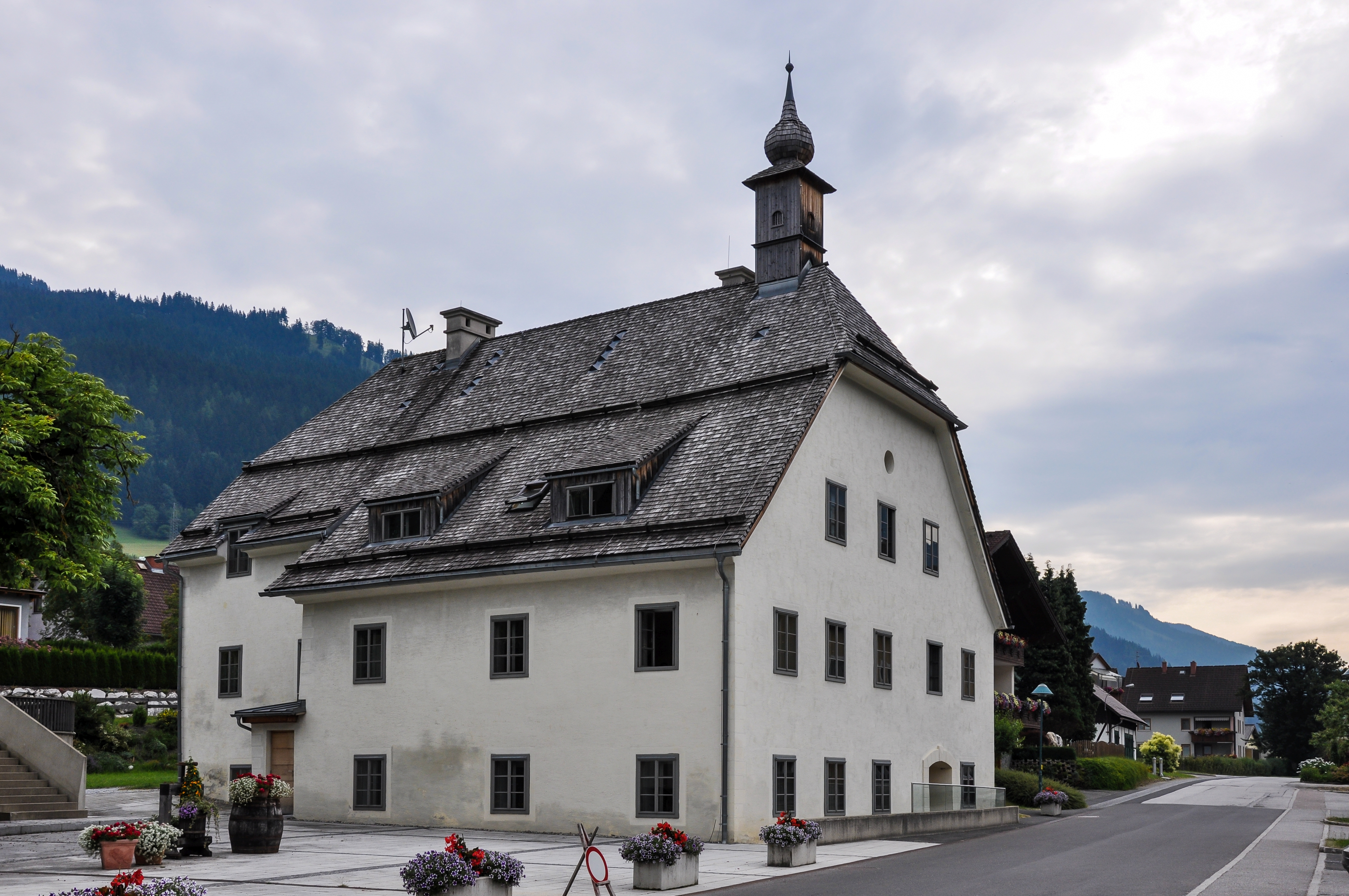
- Former town hall

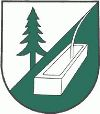
- Coat of arms

- Location within Austria
- Coordinates: 47°47′00″N 14°58′00″E
- Country: Austria
- State: Styria
- District: Liezen

Area
  - Total: 36.24 km^{2} (13.99 sq mi)
- Elevation: 745 m (2,444 ft)

Population (1 January 2016)
  - Total: 366
  - Density: 10.1/km^{2} (26.2/sq mi)
- Time zone: UTC+1 (CET)
  - Summer (DST): UTC+2 (CEST)
- Postal code: 8782
- Area code: 03617
- Vehicle registration: LI
- Website: www.treglwang.com

Treglwang is a former municipality in the district of Liezen in the Austrian state of Styria. Since the 2015 Styria municipal structural reform, it is part of the municipality Gaishorn am See.

== Geography ==
Treglwang lies in the Palten valley.
