= Gams bei Hieflau =

- Former municipality
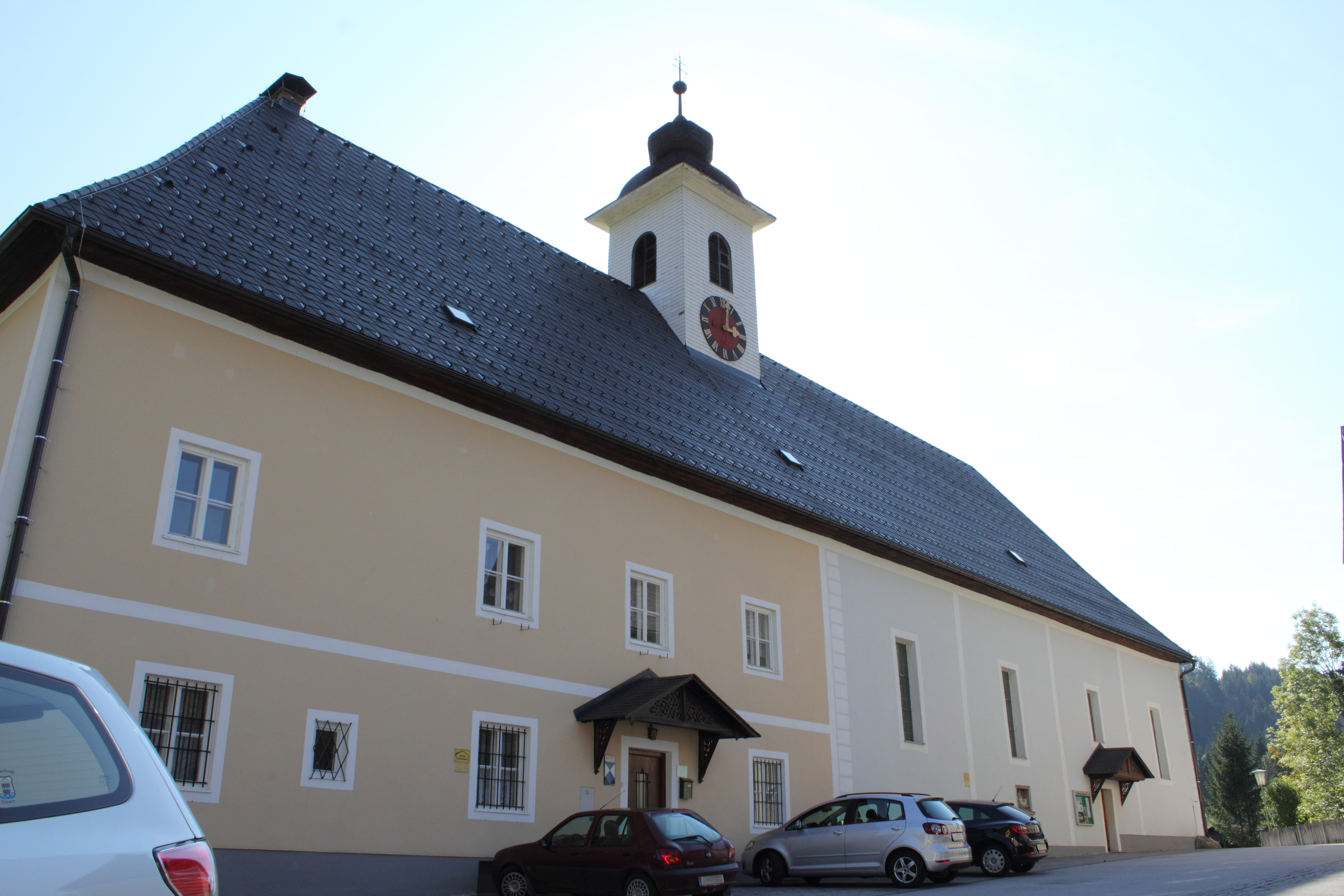
- Gams bei Hieflau parish church

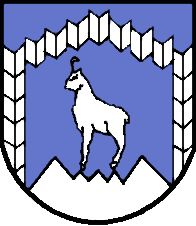
- Coat of arms

- Location within Austria
- Coordinates: 47°40′00″N 14°48′00″E
- Country: Austria
- State: Styria
- District: Liezen

Area
  - Total: 46.23 km^{2} (17.85 sq mi)
- Elevation: 539 m (1,768 ft)

Population (1 January 2021)
  - Total: 504
  - Density: 10.9/km^{2} (28.2/sq mi)
- Time zone: UTC+1 (CET)
  - Summer (DST): UTC+2 (CEST)
- Postal code: 8922
- Area code: +43 3637
- Vehicle registration: LI

Gams bei Hieflau is a former municipality in the district of Liezen in the Austrian state of Styria. Since the 2015 Styria municipal structural reform, it is part of the municipality Landl.

== Geography ==
Gams lies in a tributary valley of the Enns and the Salza in upper Styria. It lies in the western foothills of the Hochschwab.
