= Palfau =

- Former municipality
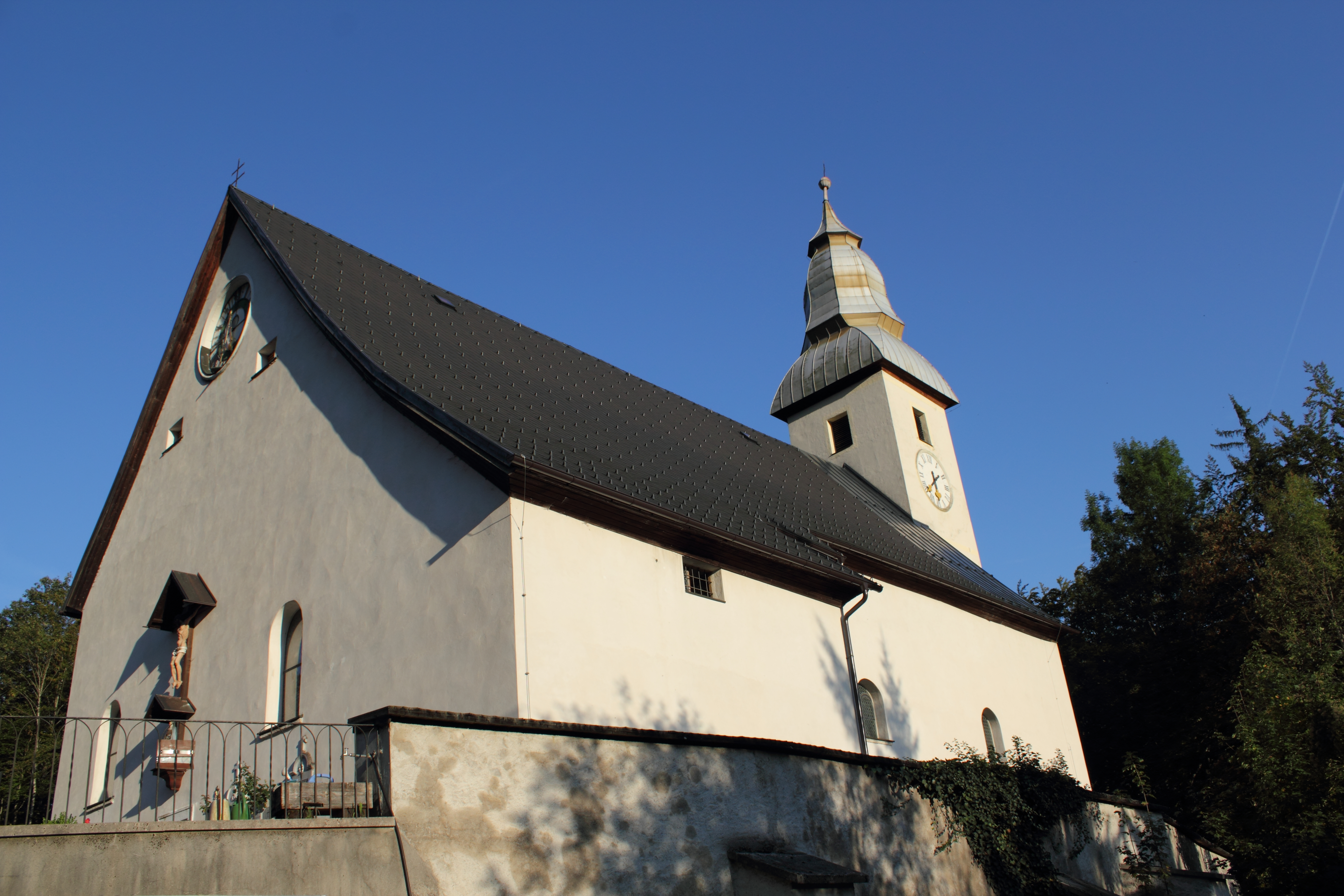
- Palfau Church of All Saints

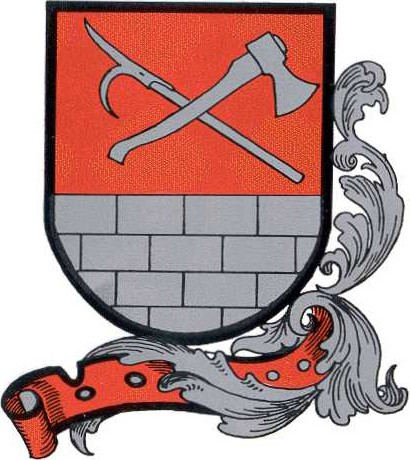
- Coat of arms

- Location within Austria
- Coordinates: 47°42′35″N 14°48′15″E
- Country: Austria
- State: Styria
- District: Liezen

Area
  - Total: 58.07 km^{2} (22.42 sq mi)
- Elevation: 512 m (1,680 ft)

Population (1 January 2016)
  - Total: 394
  - Density: 6.78/km^{2} (17.6/sq mi)
- Time zone: UTC+1 (CET)
  - Summer (DST): UTC+2 (CEST)
- Postal code: 8923
- Area code: 03638
- Vehicle registration: LI
- Website: www.palfau.at

Palfau is a former municipality in the district of Liezen in the Austrian state of Styria. Since the 2015 Styria municipal structural reform, it is part of the municipality Landl.

== Population ==
Historical population
Year	Pop.	±%
1869	655	—
1880	659	+0.6%
1890	637	−3.3%
1900	618	−3.0%
1910	595	−3.7%
1923	560	−5.9%
1934	540	−3.6%
1939	536	−0.7%
1951	543	+1.3%
1961	512	−5.7%
1971	508	−0.8%
1981	512	+0.8%
1991	519	+1.4%
2001	449	−13.5%
2011	405	−9.8%
