= Trieben =

- Municipality
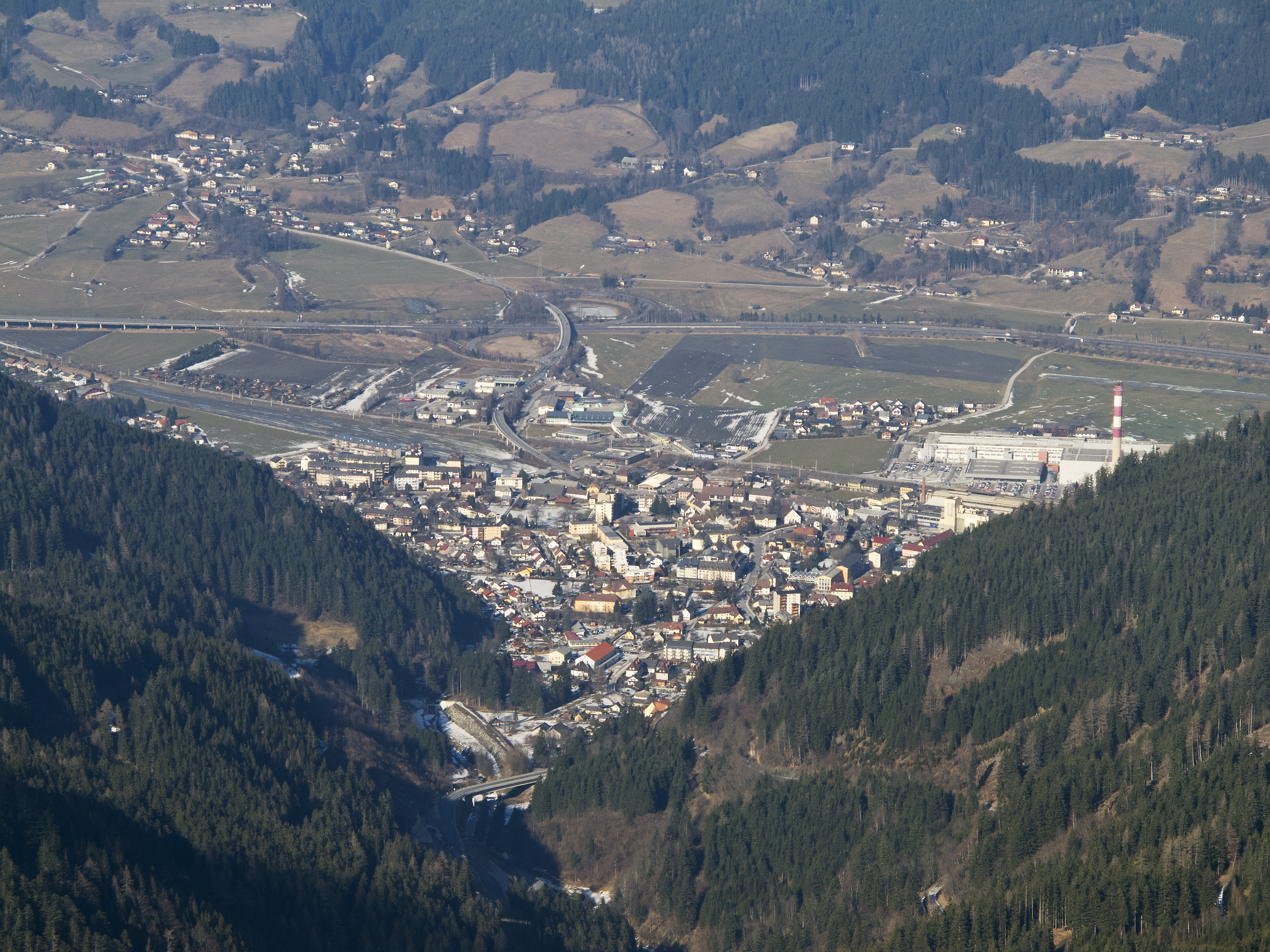
- Trieben seen from Triebenstein

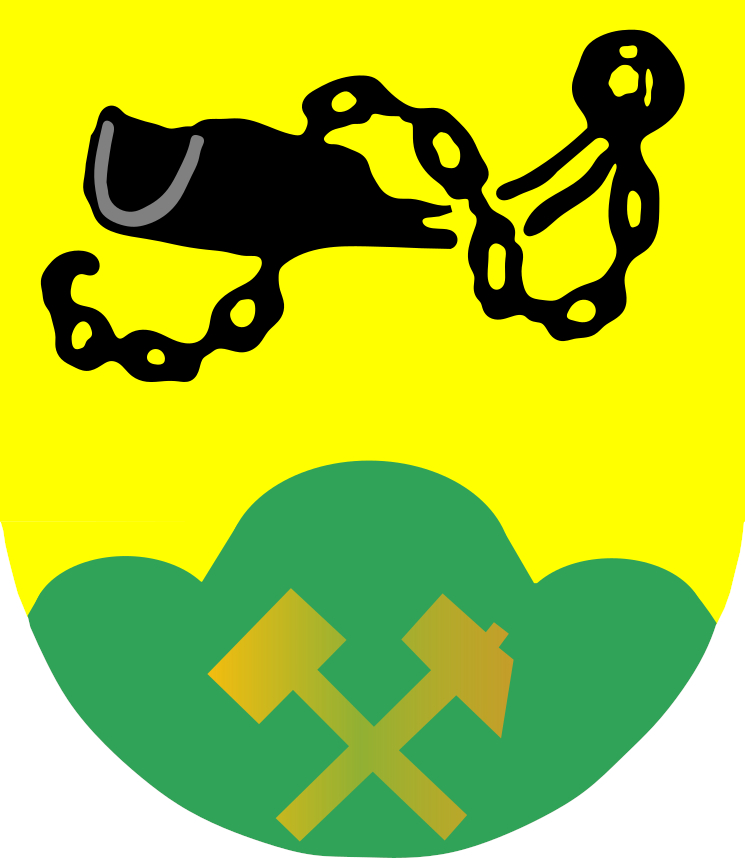
- Coat of arms

- Location within Austria
- Coordinates: 47°29′11″N 14°29′08″E
- Country: Austria
- State: Styria
- District: Liezen

Government
  - Mayor: Helmut Schöttl (SPÖ)

Area
  - Total: 45.51 km^{2} (17.57 sq mi)
- Elevation: 708 m (2,323 ft)

Population (2018-01-01)
  - Total: 3,390
  - Density: 74.5/km^{2} (193/sq mi)
- Time zone: UTC+1 (CET)
  - Summer (DST): UTC+2 (CEST)
- Postal code: 8784
- Area code: 03615
- Vehicle registration: LI
- Website: www.trieben.net

Trieben (German: [ˈtʁiːbn̩]) is a town in Styria in central Austria, in the Palten River Valley. It is a quaint town with a Globe sculpture in the Main Square.

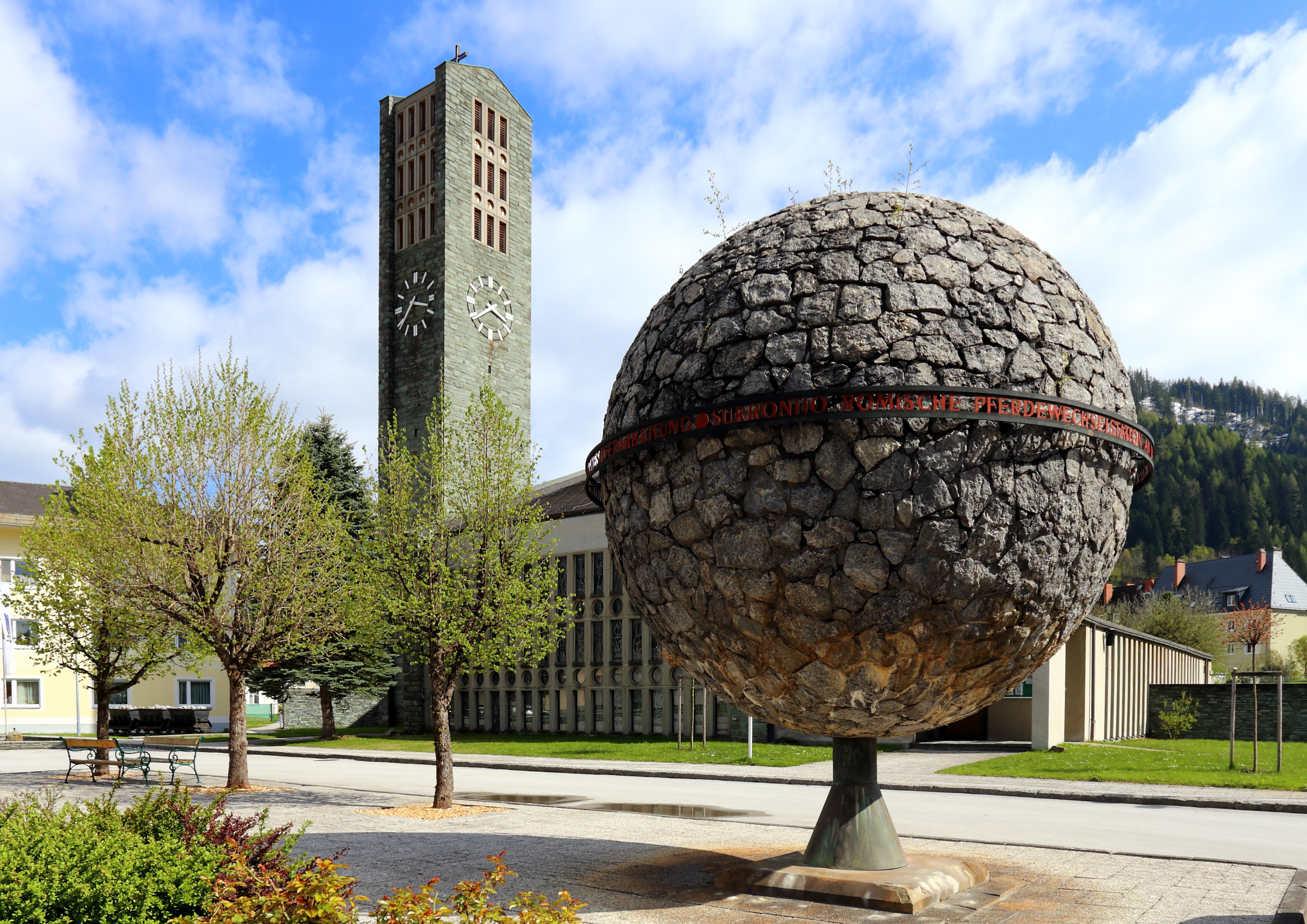
The Globe sculpture

== Population ==
Historical population
Year	Pop.	±%
1869	1,194	—
1880	1,387	+16.2%
1890	1,469	+5.9%
1900	1,669	+13.6%
1910	1,967	+17.9%
1923	2,052	+4.3%
1934	2,438	+18.8%
1939	2,397	−1.7%
1951	2,926	+22.1%
1961	4,023	+37.5%
1971	4,639	+15.3%
1981	4,467	−3.7%
1991	4,026	−9.9%
2001	3,808	−5.4%
2011	3,481	−8.6%
