= Ardning =

- Municipality
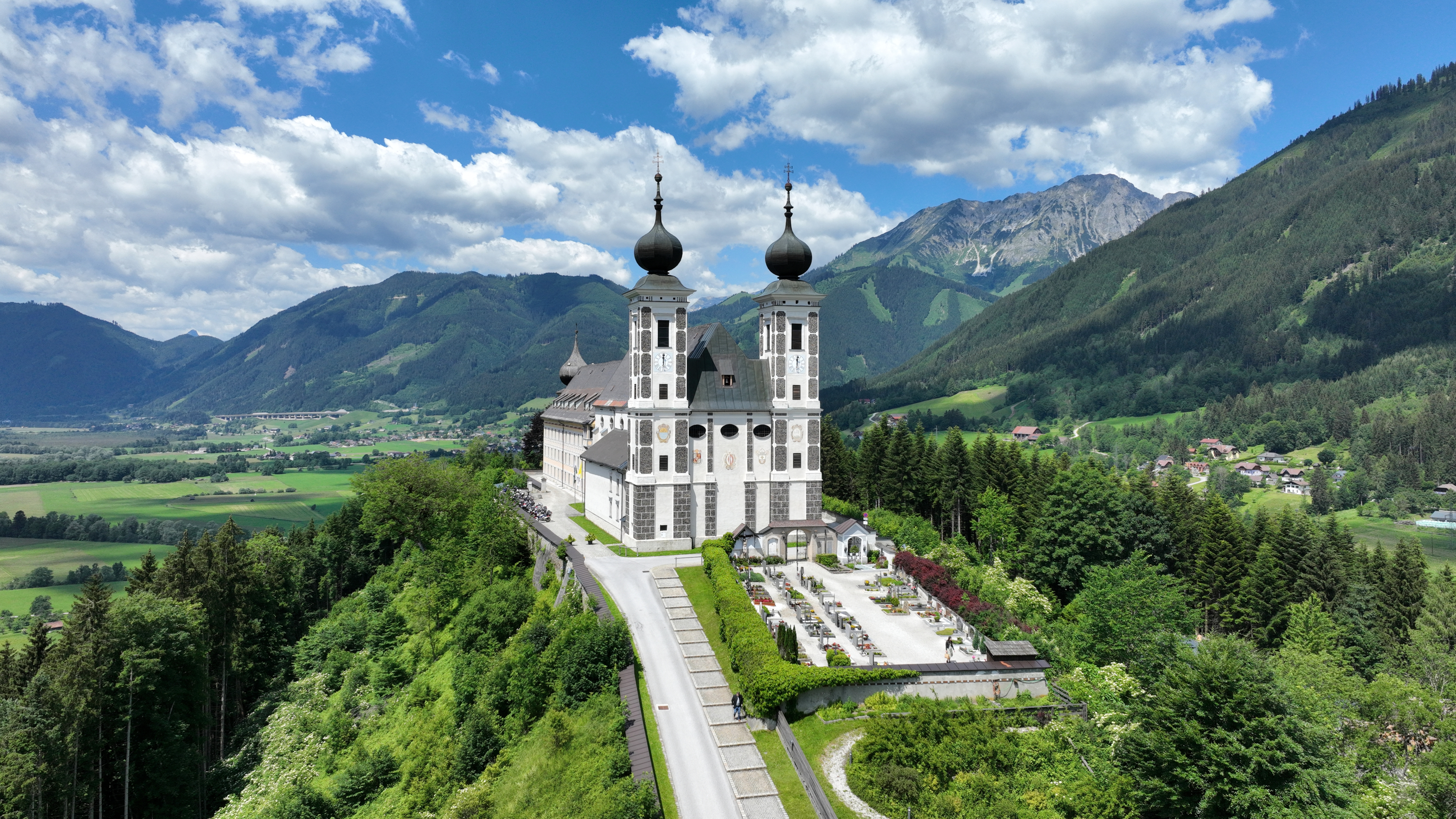
- Parish and pilgrimage church Frauenberg in Ardning

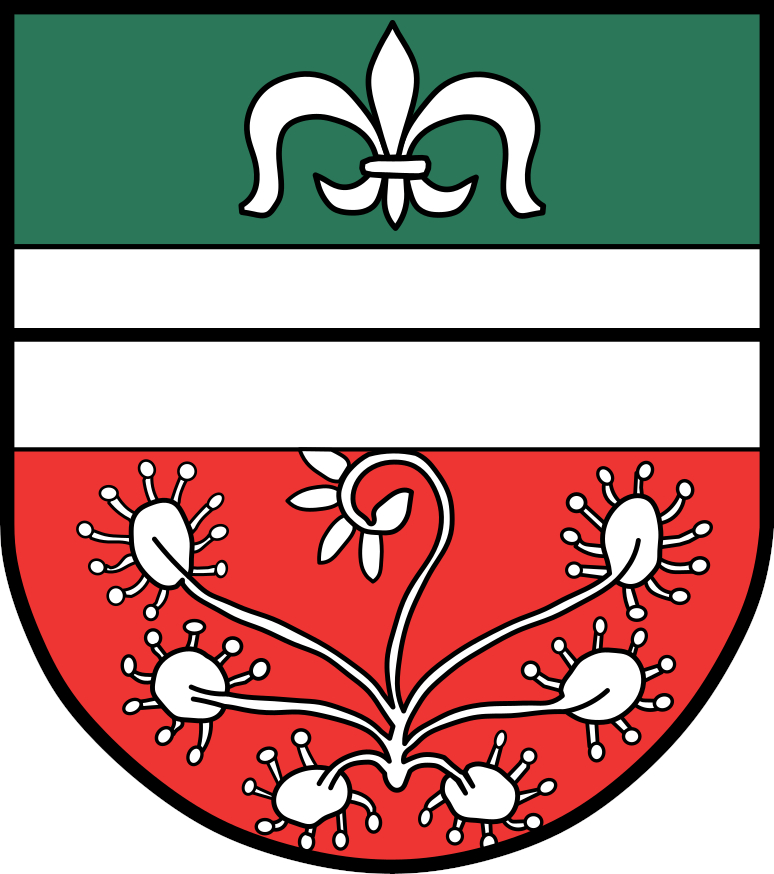
- Coat of arms

- Location within Austria
- Coordinates: 47°35′29″N 14°21′50″E
- Country: Austria
- State: Styria
- District: Liezen

Government
  - Mayor: Johann Egger (SPÖ)

Area
  - Total: 34.04 km^{2} (13.14 sq mi)
- Elevation: 696 m (2,283 ft)

Population (2018-01-01)
  - Total: 1,239
  - Density: 36.40/km^{2} (94.27/sq mi)
- Time zone: UTC+1 (CET)
  - Summer (DST): UTC+2 (CEST)
- Postal code: 8904
- Area code: 03612
- Vehicle registration: LI
- Website: www.irdning.at

Ardning is a municipality in the district of Liezen in the Austrian state of Styria.
