= Pichl-Kainisch =

- Former municipality
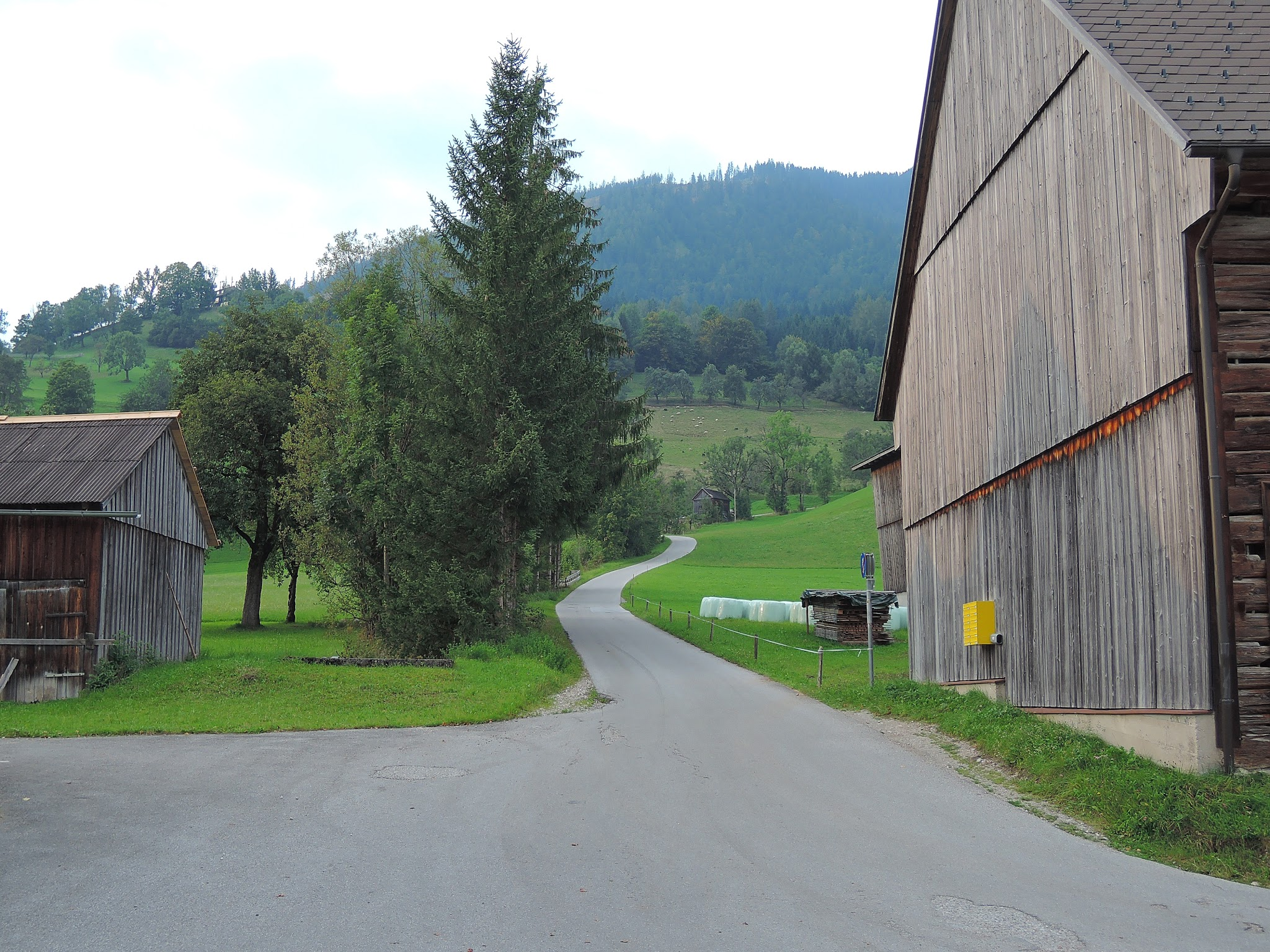
- Street in Pichl-Kainisch

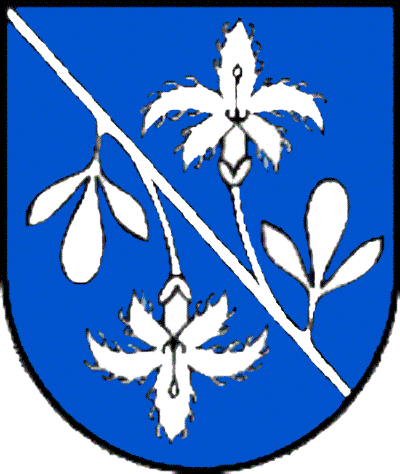
- Coat of arms

- Location within Austria
- Coordinates: 47°34′10″N 13°51′14″E
- Country: Austria
- State: Styria
- District: Liezen

Area
  - Total: 29.84 km^{2} (11.52 sq mi)
- Elevation: 803 m (2,635 ft)

Population (1 January 2016)
  - Total: 743
  - Density: 24.9/km^{2} (64.5/sq mi)
- Time zone: UTC+1 (CET)
  - Summer (DST): UTC+2 (CEST)
- Postal code: 8984
- Area code: 03624
- Vehicle registration: LI
- Website: www.pichl-kainisch.at

Pichl-Kainisch is a former municipality in the Salzkammergut in the Liezen (district) Austrian state of Styria. Since the 2015 Styria municipal structural reform, it is part of the municipality Bad Mitterndorf.

== Population ==
Historical population
Year	Pop.	±%
1971	626	—
1981	659	+5.3%
1991	718	+9.0%
2001	782	+8.9%
2013	759	−2.9%

== Territorial Division ==
The municipal area included four localities (population on January 1, 2017 according to localities):

Outer Kainic (277)

buttons (193)

Muhlreith (75)

Pichl near Aussee (195)

The community consisted of the only cadastral community Pichl.
