= Lassing mining disaster =

Coordinates: 47°32′03″N 14°14′47″E

The mining disaster at Lassing occurred the morning of 17 July 1998. The accident in the Upper Styrian municipality of Lassing was the worst of its kind in Austria since 1945.

== Geological and historic background ==
Lassing is the largest known carbonated talc deposit in the Eastern Alps. Geologically, it is part of the northern greywacke zone in Upper Styria. The deposit consists of two fields, the North and South Field, that latter having no connexion to the surface of the terrain. It is covered by unconsolidated rock, about 60 metres thick.

Lassing talc was discovered in 1891 by the local landowner, Krennmoar, during construction work. He secured the mining rights. In 1901, the firm of Bischetsrieder & Gielow began underground extraction. In the mid-1920s, mining was suspended for a few years due to the bankruptcy of the owner. In 1939, the mine was acquired by the family firm of Talkumwerke Naintsch. In 1988 the pit went into the possession of the Rio Tinto Group. In the 1990s, the mine and its associated processing works produced around 30,000 tonnes of talc per year. At the time of the accident, the company had 34 employees of whom 8 worked underground.

Until the late 1970s, the North Field was worked by caving (Bruchbau). Then the mining operation moved to the South Field. Here, pillar and chamber work was used to extract the talc, using lean concrete. The South Field was opened up via the 204-metre-deep Renée Shaft, sunk in 1978-80. From the shaft, the talc deposit was accessed on ten levels.

== Course of events ==
On 17 July 1998 the roof of an illegal level collapsed. Water poured in and caused a mudslide to break into the mine. At the surface this became evident as a house in the village of Moos, under which the mine was located, slowly began to collapse and sink into the sinkhole being formed. The crater grew larger and deeper and gradually 2 houses were destroyed and 18 damaged. After the accident the houses in the immediate vicinity were demolished.

At this time 34 people worked at the Naintscher Mineralwerke, including Georg Hainzl, who was probably buried in a rest-chamber during the first mudslide.

Initially there was telephone contact to the 24-year-old miner, but then he was cut off. A rescue party of nine miners and a geologist went that same day into the mine. When, around 10 p.m. the second mudslide caused the mine to implode, the "horror in slow motion" began. The crater grew larger, lights went out, lamp posts leaned over at an angle. And in addition, the rescue squad was now missing.

Soon it was reported that there was no way of saving the eleven victims. An order of special drills from Germany was cancelled by the management. Rescue efforts were sluggish. Outside help was not wanted. In charge of drilling was the technician, Leopold Abraham of the OMV.

Then the "Miracle of Lassing" occurred. The first miner to be buried, Georg Hainzl, was rescued after ten days and was found in surprisingly good health. His rescue was achieved by a German company that had previously worked with OMV and had a suitable drill rig available that, unlike the OMV equipment, was suitable for large diameters and rather shallow depths. With the help of logistics and other departments of the OMV the hole was drilled. The decompression chamber specially made to measure by the OMV was not needed, as no overpressure existed in the survival chamber in which Georg Hainzl found himself, something that could only be ascertained after the drilling. The man who subsequently became Lower Austria's fire chief, Josef Buchta, was heavily involved in the construction of this decompression chamber.

The ten men in the rescue team, however, remained in the mine and were declared dead. In 2000, the search for their bodies was called off.

== End of talc mining ==
The pit accident sealed the fate of talc mining here after around 100 years of operation. The mine was closed, the mill works was sold in 2007 to the Paltentaler Holding in Rottenmann. By 2003, the Naintscher Mineralwerke had paid around 30 million euros in rescue costs and compensation to those left behind and to the rescued miner, Georg Hainzl. In addition there were rebuilding costs for the 20 destroyed and damaged houses and compensation for the devaluation of property. At the former sinkhole, into which the houses sank, there is today a memorial to the ten miners who were buried.

== Consequences for Austrian mining ==
In Austria the lessons from Lassing led to far-reaching changes in mining, rescue technology and information policy. There followed legal reforms in 1999, 2002 and 2004. The anachronistic seeming Leoben Local Mining Office (Berghauptmannschaft) which was responsible in the case of Lassing, was disbanded. Some of its duties were taken over by the newly created mining authorities (Montanbehörden). In addition the big mine rescue departments of the nationalized enterprises, which for decades had served nearby small businesses, but had gradually disappeared, were reformed. At the operational level, a mine rescue service was set up, which is coordinated by the Chamber of Commerce.

Because there was no organized psychological health care at that time for victims and their families, the role was taken on by the local parish priest. Only the governor, Landeshauptfrau Waltraud Klasnic, who had travelled quickly to the scene of the accident took care of them. That is why later she organised the Styrian Crisis Intervention Team, which cares for victims of accidents, disasters, etc. As a result of her work in Lassing she gained her nickname of "state mother" (Landesmutter).

== Criticism ==
In the wake of the accident there was fierce criticism of both the company's mining methods and the rescue effort.

The company was alleged to have tunnelled illegally under built-up areas and too close to the surface. As a result, there were no up to date plans so that the rescue work often had to rely purely on the oral statements of miners in the wake of the disaster.

In the face of the publicity the ten miners were sent back into the mine to rescue Hainzl. According to internal sources they should have secured the mine from further collapse first.

The then Minister of Economy Johann Farnleitner was accused of having rejected foreign assistance, which was offered immediately, for too long.

The rescue operations were continued under pressure from the media. According to experts, who assessed there was no chance of survival, they should have called rescue attempts off earlier.

== Literature ==
- Report by the International Committee of Experts on the Lassing mine accident.
