= Pichl-Preunegg =

- Former municipality
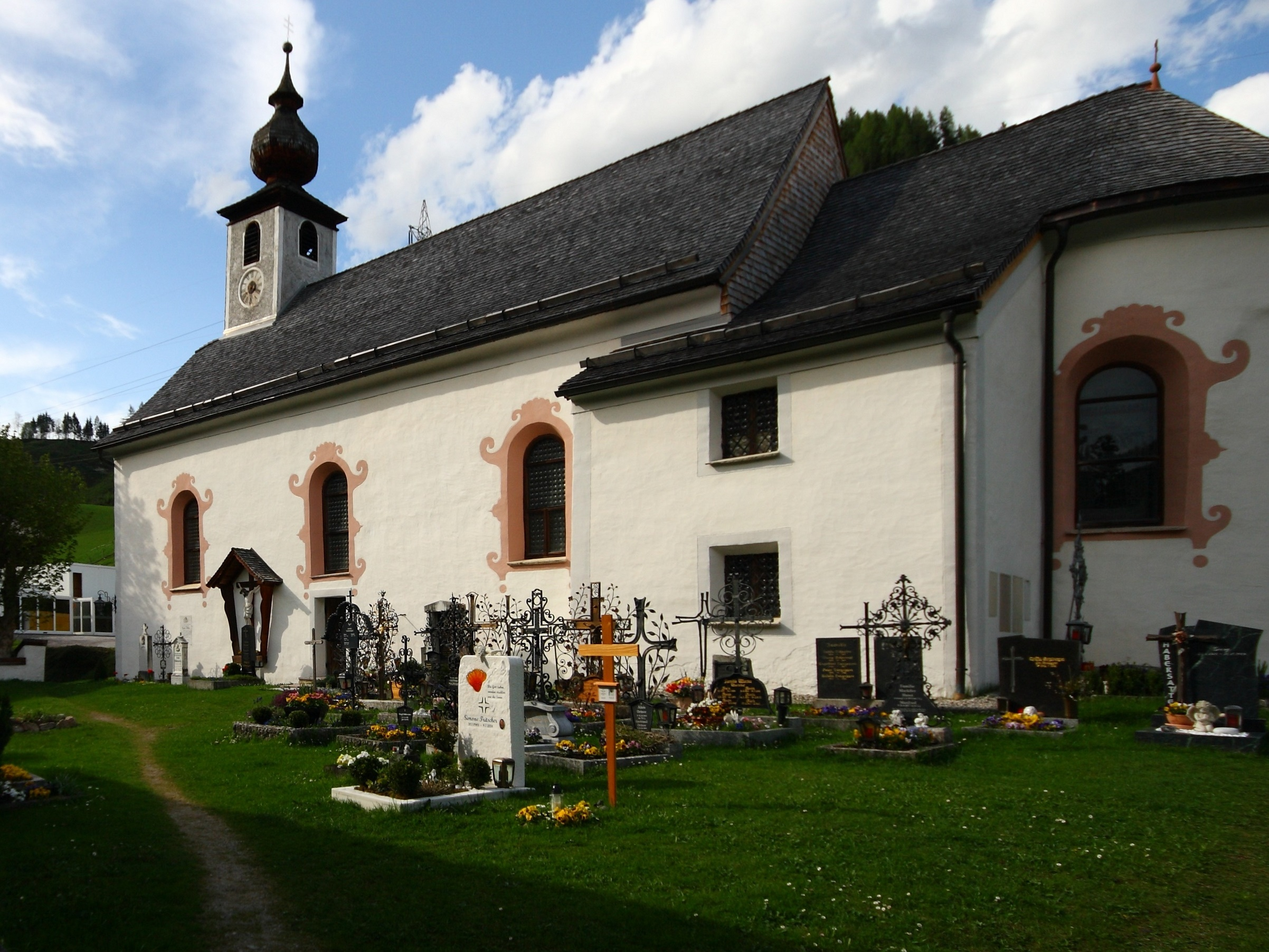
- Pichl-Preunegg parish church

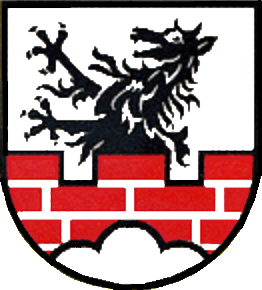
- Coat of arms

- Location within Austria
- Coordinates: 47°24′00″N 13°36′00″E
- Country: Austria
- State: Styria
- District: Liezen

Area
  - Total: 54.34 km^{2} (20.98 sq mi)
- Elevation: 799 m (2,621 ft)

Population (1 January 2016)
  - Total: 898
  - Density: 16.5/km^{2} (42.8/sq mi)
- Time zone: UTC+1 (CET)
  - Summer (DST): UTC+2 (CEST)
- Postal code: 8973
- Area code: 06454
- Vehicle registration: GB
- Website: www.pichl-preunegg.steiermark.at

Pichl-Preunegg is a former municipality in the district of Liezen in Styria, Austria. Since the 2015 Styria municipal structural reform, it is part of the municipality Schladming.
