= Oppenberg =

- Former municipality
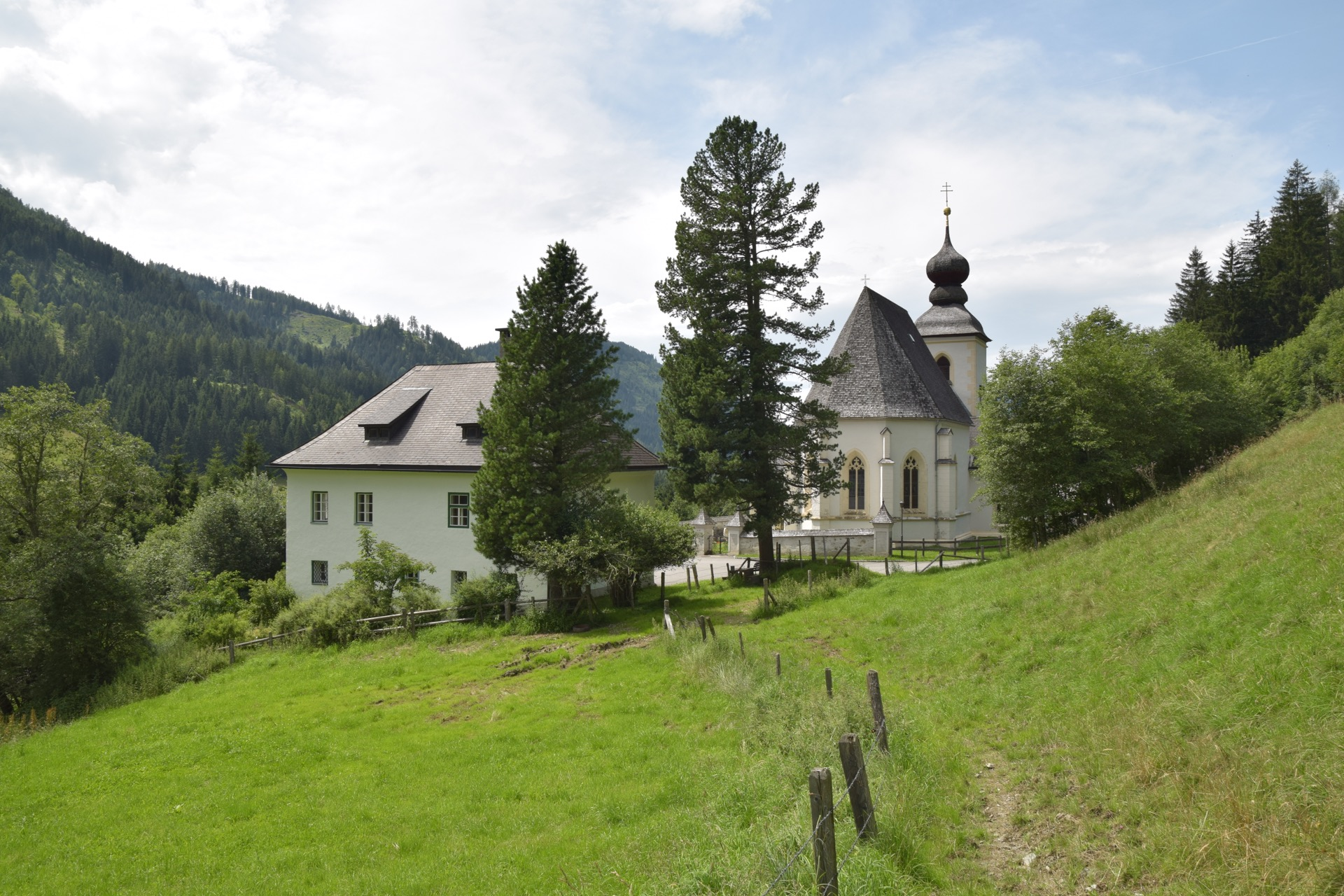
- Oppenberg parish church

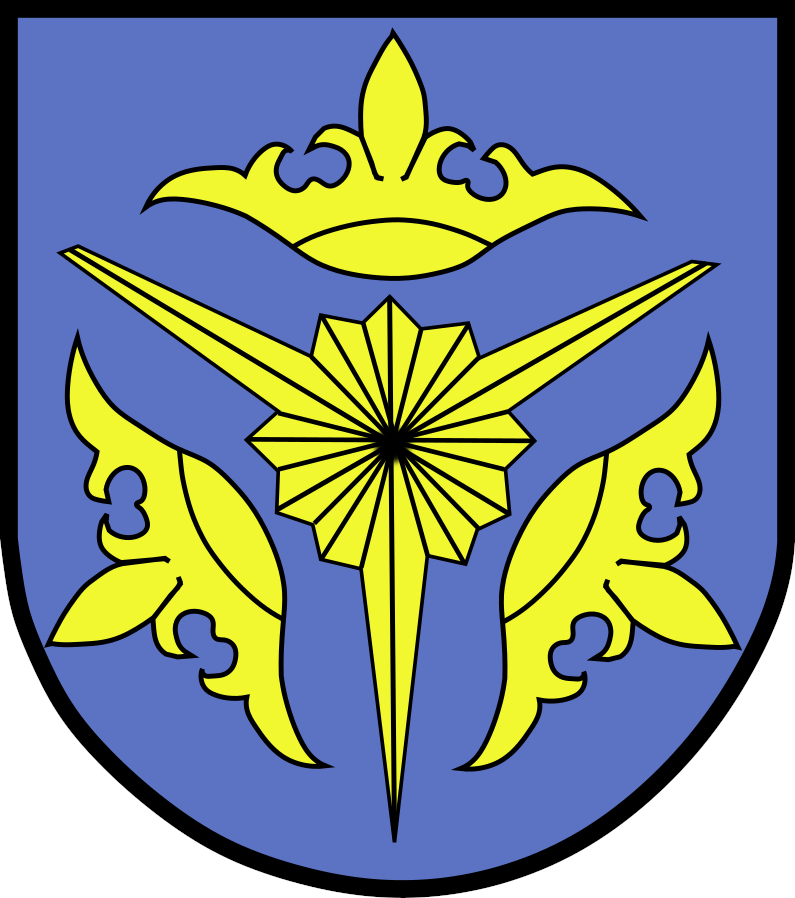
- Coat of arms

- Location within Austria
- Coordinates: 47°48′0″N 14°27′0″E
- Country: Austria
- State: Styria
- District: Liezen

Area
  - Total: 92.81 km^{2} (35.83 sq mi)
- Elevation: 1,006 m (3,301 ft)

Population (1 January 2016)
  - Total: 242
  - Density: 2.61/km^{2} (6.75/sq mi)
- Time zone: UTC+1 (CET)
  - Summer (DST): UTC+2 (CEST)
- Postal code: 8786
- Area code: 03619
- Vehicle registration: LI
- Website: www.oppenberg.at

Oppenberg is a former municipality in the district of Liezen in Styria, Austria. Since the 2015 Styria municipal structural reform, it is part of the municipality Rottenmann.
