= Wildalpen =

- Municipality
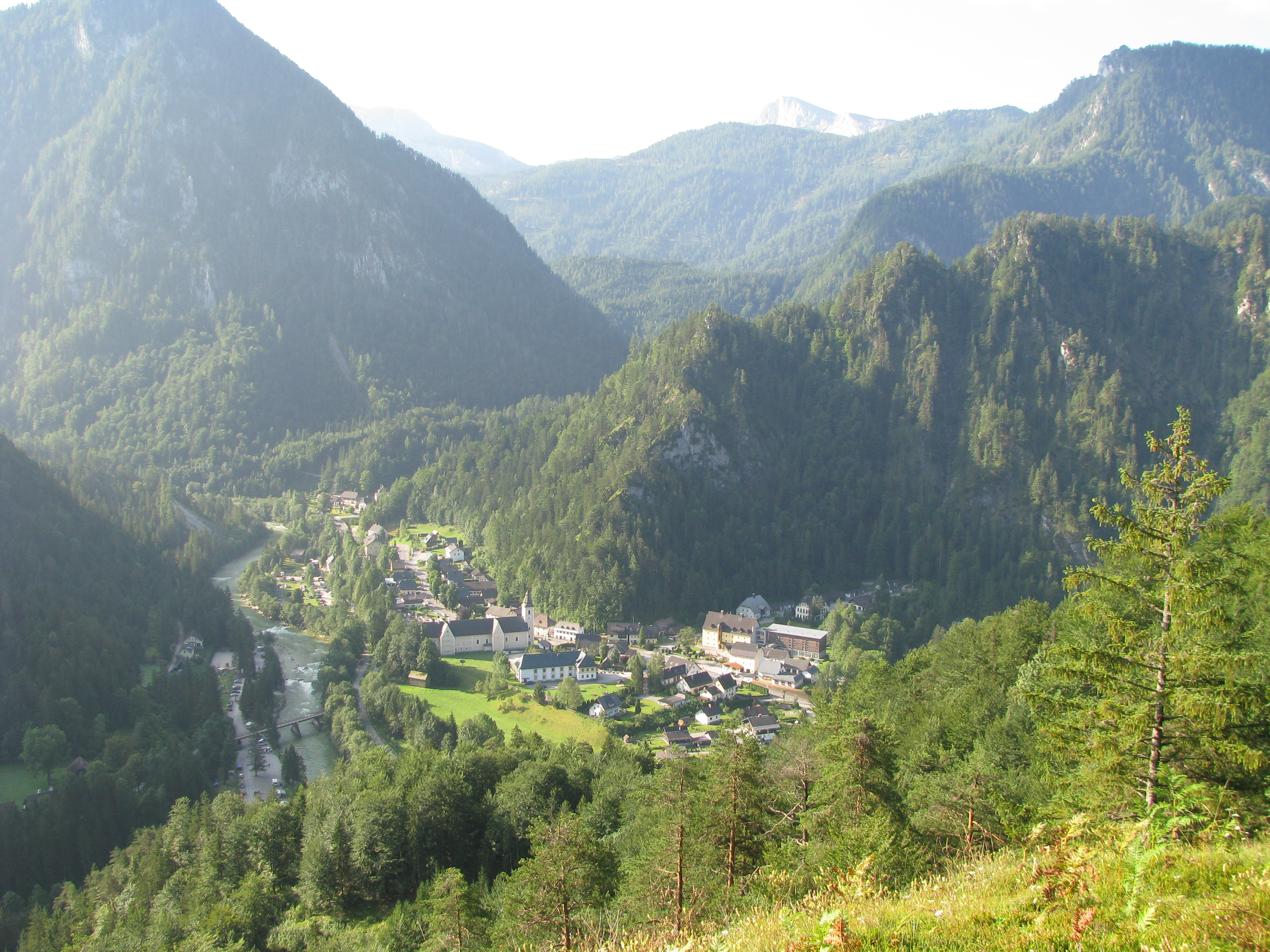
- Wildalpen

- Coat of arms

- Location within Austria
- Coordinates: 47°39′00″N 14°59′00″E
- Country: Austria
- State: Styria
- District: Liezen

Government
  - Mayor: Karin Gulas (SPÖ)

Area
  - Total: 203.11 km^{2} (78.42 sq mi)
- Elevation: 609 m (1,998 ft)

Population (2025)
  - Total: 432
  - Density: 2.13/km^{2} (5.51/sq mi)
- Time zone: UTC+1 (CET)
  - Summer (DST): UTC+2 (CEST)
- Postal code: 8924
- Area code: 03636
- Vehicle registration: LI
- Website: www.wildalpen.at

Wildalpen is a municipality in the district of Liezen in the Austrian state of Styria. As of 2025, the municipality has a population of 432.

== Population ==
Historical population
Year	Pop.	±%
1869	971	—
1880	943	−2.9%
1890	911	−3.4%
1900	911	+0.0%
1910	897	−1.5%
1923	978	+9.0%
1934	773	−21.0%
1939	774	+0.1%
1951	860	+11.1%
1961	854	−0.7%
1971	770	−9.8%
1981	699	−9.2%
1991	640	−8.4%
2001	602	−5.9%
2011	537	−10.8%
2021	447	−16.8%
2025	432	−3.4%
