= Wörschach =

- Municipality
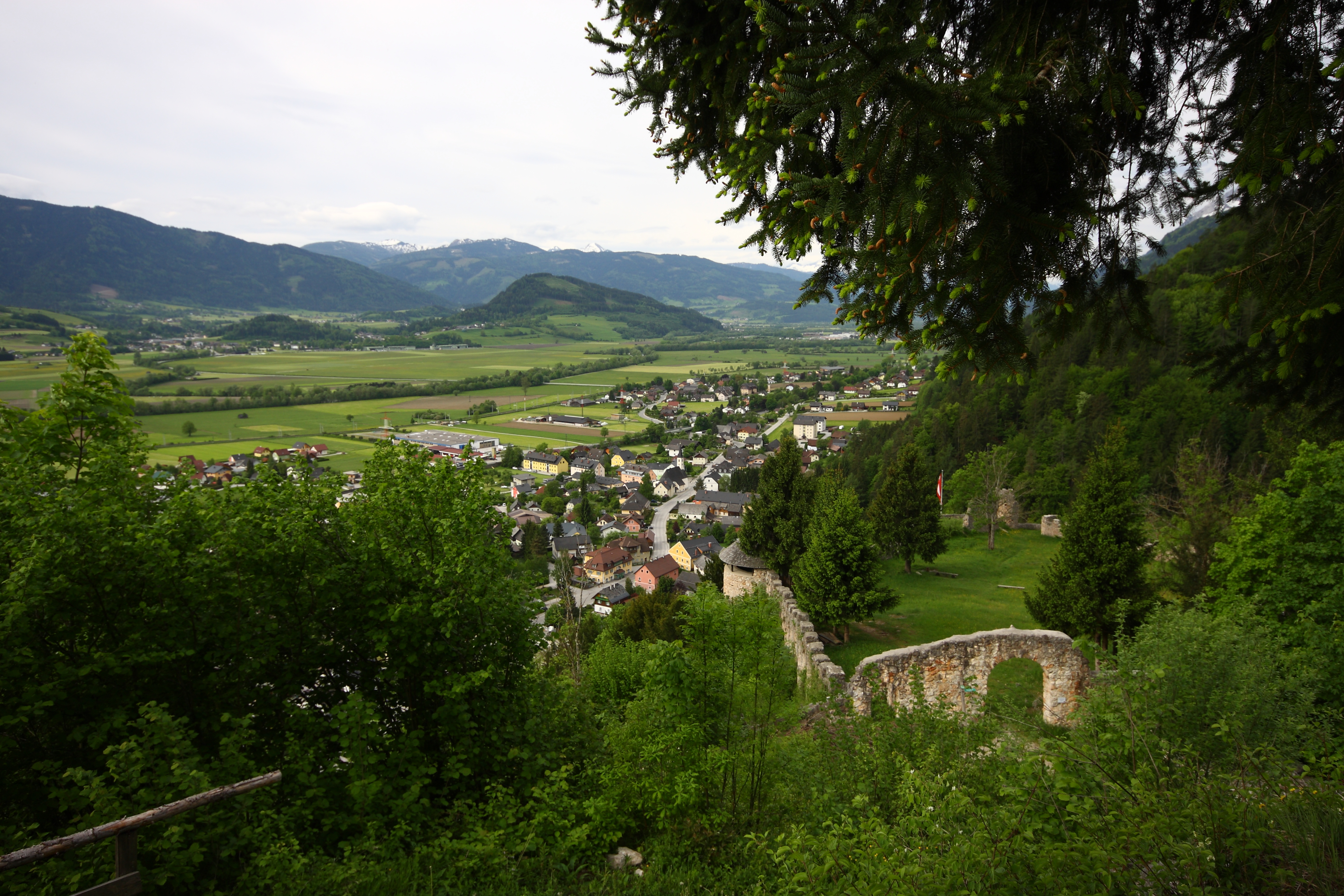
- View of Wörschach

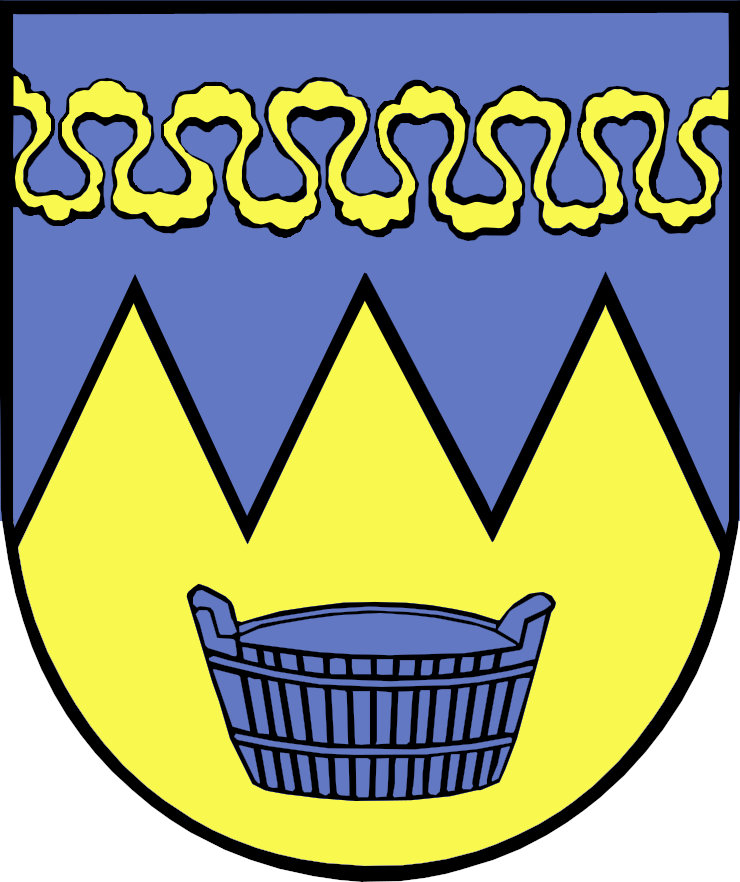
- Coat of arms

- Location within Austria
- Coordinates: 47°33′06″N 14°08′52″E
- Country: Austria
- State: Styria
- District: Liezen

Government
  - Mayor: Franz Lemmerer (ÖVP)

Area
  - Total: 42.89 km^{2} (16.56 sq mi)
- Elevation: 643 m (2,110 ft)

Population (2018-01-01)
  - Total: 1,122
  - Density: 26.16/km^{2} (67.75/sq mi)
- Time zone: UTC+1 (CET)
  - Summer (DST): UTC+2 (CEST)
- Postal code: 8942
- Area code: 03682
- Vehicle registration: LI
- Website: www.woerschach.at

Wörschach (German: [ˈvœɐ̯ʃax]) is a municipality in the district of Liezen in the Austrian state of Styria.

== Geography ==
Wörschach lies on the southern border of Upper Austria.
