= Altenmarkt bei Sankt Gallen =

- Municipality
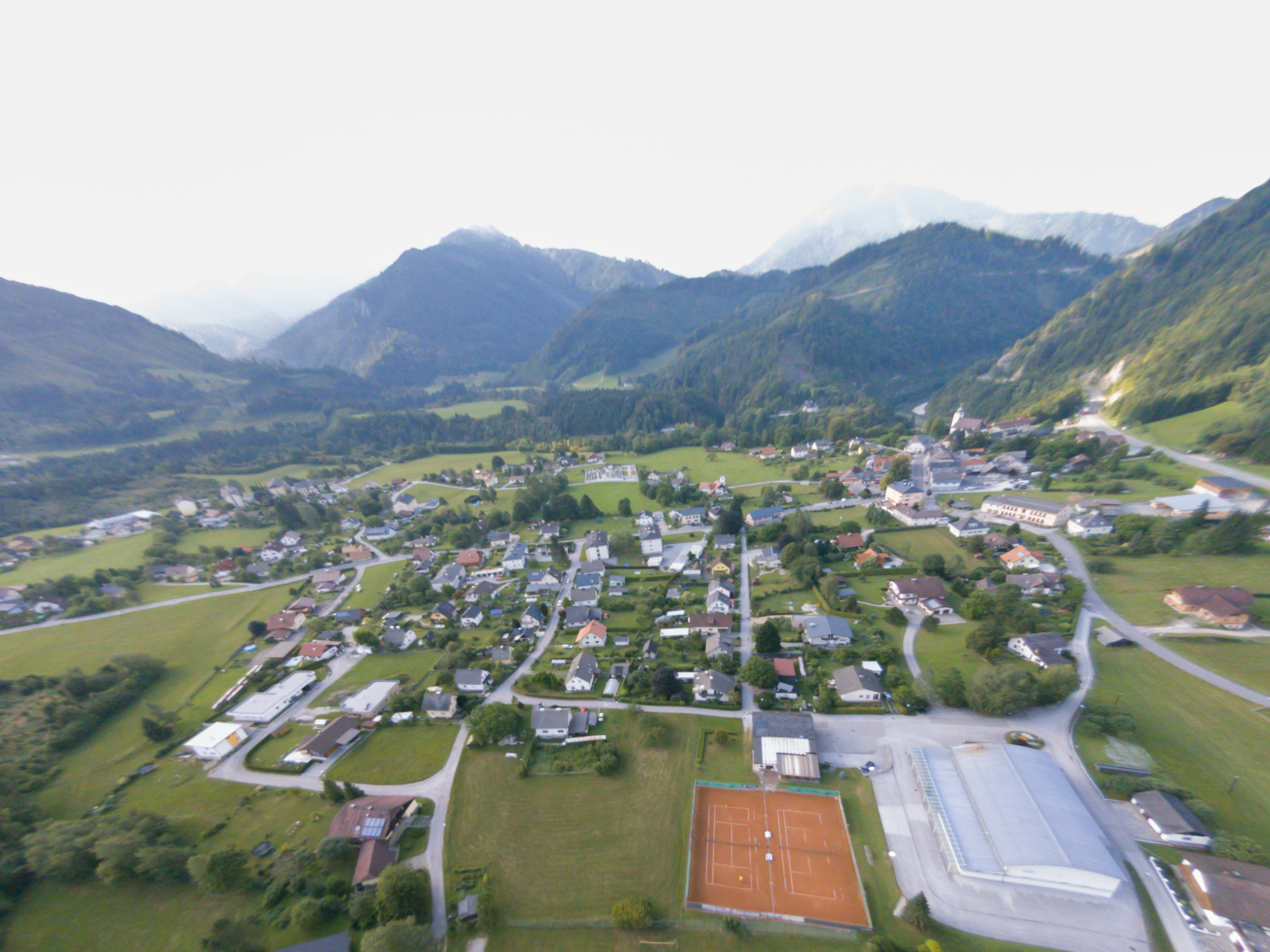
- Aerial view of Altenmarkt

- Coat of arms

- Location within Austria
- Coordinates: 47°43′00″N 14°38′00″E
- Country: Austria
- State: Styria
- District: Liezen

Government
  - Mayor: Hannes Andrae (SPÖ)

Area
  - Total: 43.38 km^{2} (16.75 sq mi)
- Elevation: 467 m (1,532 ft)

Population (2018-01-01)
  - Total: 822
  - Density: 18.9/km^{2} (49.1/sq mi)
- Time zone: UTC+1 (CET)
  - Summer (DST): UTC+2 (CEST)
- Postal code: 8934
- Area code: 03632
- Vehicle registration: LI

Altenmarkt bei Sankt Gallen (Austrian German: [ˈaltn̩ˌmaʁkt baɪ saŋkt ˈɡalən]) is a municipality in the district of Liezen in the Austrian state of Styria.

== Population ==
Historical population
| Year | Pop. | ±% |
|---|---|---|
| 1869 | 666 | — |
| 1880 | 620 | −6.9% |
| 1890 | 584 | −5.8% |
| 1900 | 667 | +14.2% |
| 1910 | 653 | −2.1% |
| 1923 | 684 | +4.7% |
| 1934 | 696 | +1.8% |
| 1939 | 617 | −11.4% |
| 1951 | 590 | −4.4% |
| 1961 | 685 | +16.1% |
| 1971 | 1,008 | +47.2% |
| 1981 | 1,008 | +0.0% |
| 1991 | 1,001 | −0.7% |
| 2001 | 941 | −6.0% |
| 2011 | 854 | −9.2% |
