= Gröbming =

- Municipality
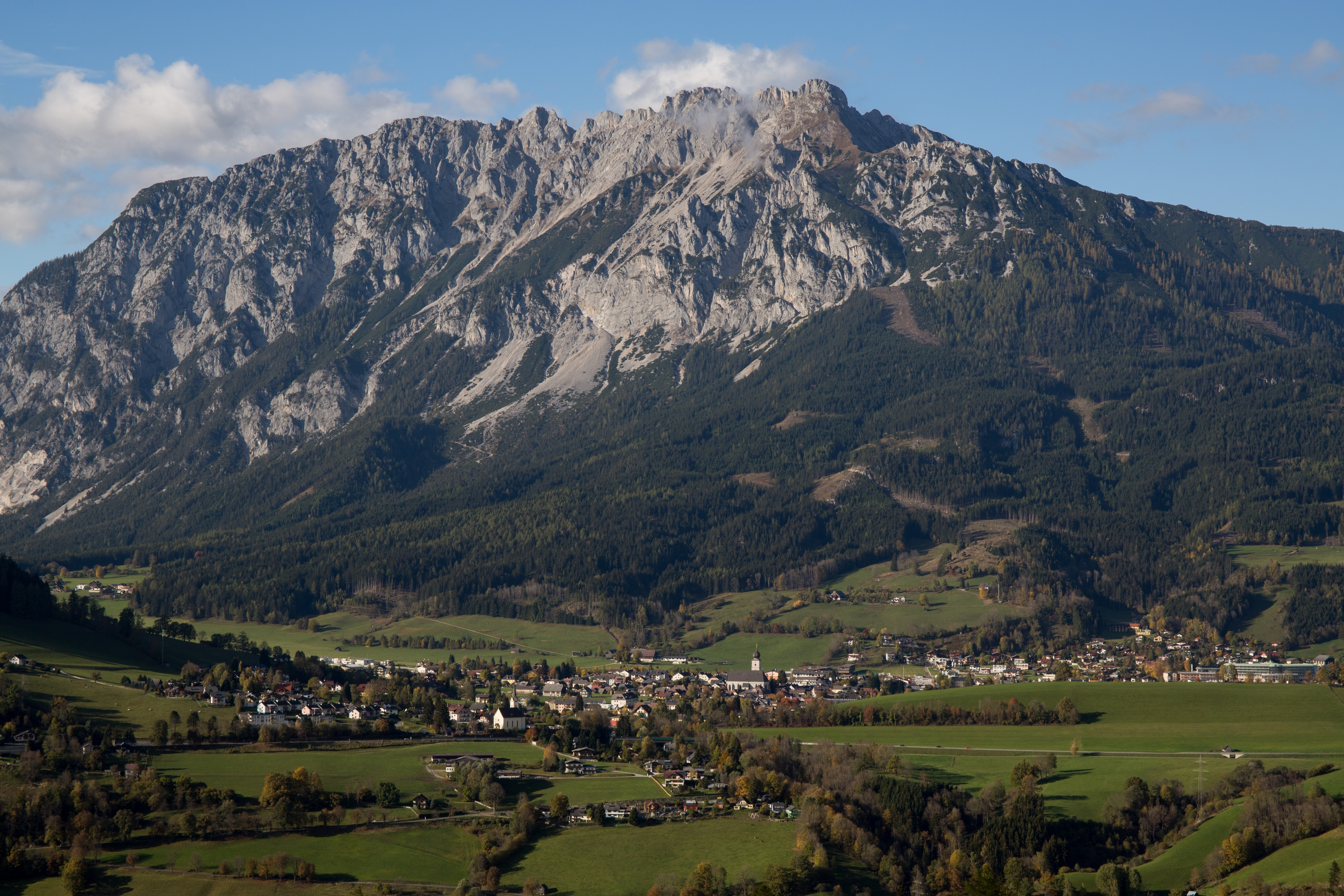

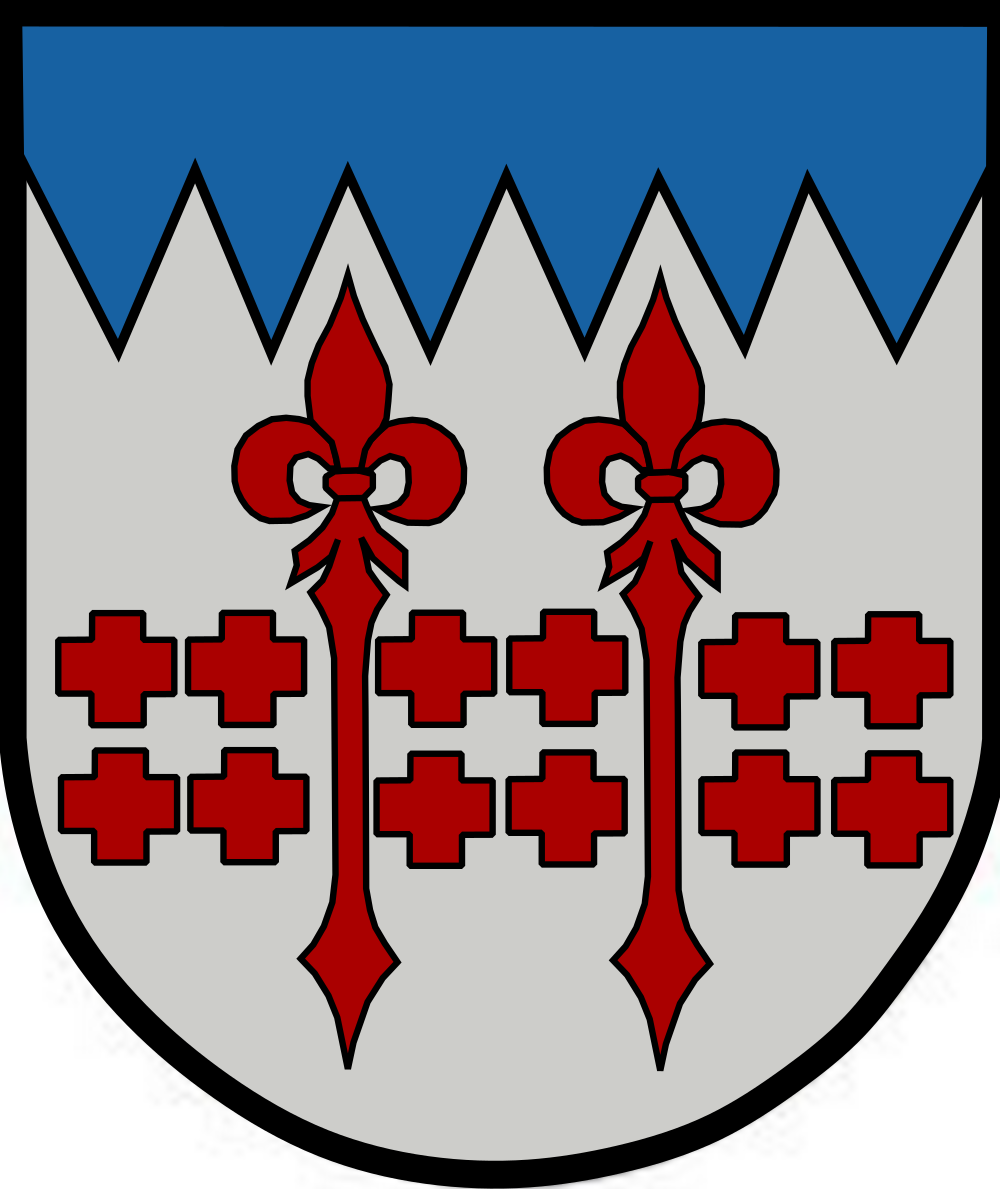
- Coat of arms

- Location within Austria
- Coordinates: 47°26′44″N 13°54′04″E
- Country: Austria
- State: Styria
- District: Liezen

Government
  - Mayor: Thomas Reingruber (SPÖ)

Area
  - Total: 66.94 km^{2} (25.85 sq mi)
- Elevation: 770 m (2,530 ft)

Population (2018-01-01)
  - Total: 3,013
  - Density: 45.01/km^{2} (116.6/sq mi)
- Time zone: UTC+1 (CET)
  - Summer (DST): UTC+2 (CEST)
- Postal code: 8962
- Area code: 03685
- Vehicle registration: GB
- Website: www.groebming.at

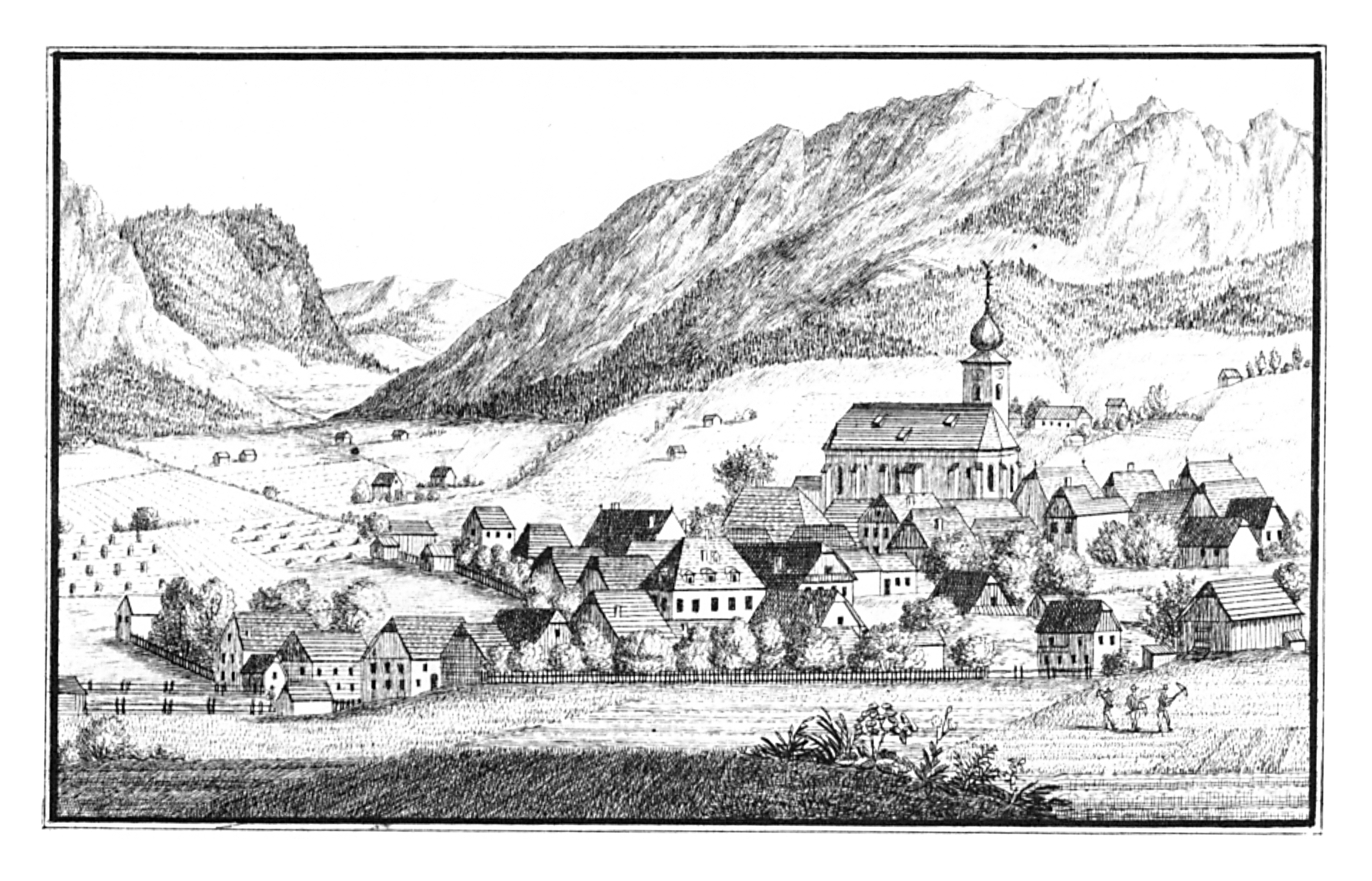
Gröbming,1830

Gröbming (German: [ˈɡʁøːbmiŋ]) is a municipality in the district of Liezen in Styria, Austria.
