= Liezen District =

Coordinates: 47.527°N 14.116°E

Liezen District Bezirk Liezen
- District
- Country: Austria
- State: Styria
- Number of municipalities: 29
- Administrative seat: Liezen

Government
  - District Governor: Christian Sulzbacher (since 2020)

Area
  - Total: 3,459 km^{2} (1,336 sq mi)

Population (2015)
  - Total: 79,535
  - Density: 22.99/km^{2} (59.55/sq mi)
- Time zone: UTC+01:00 (CET)
  - Summer (DST): UTC+02:00 (CEST)
- Vehicle registration: LI (GB) (Note: GB for subdistrict (Expositur) Gröbming; LI elsewhere.)
- NUTS code: AT222

Bezirk Liezen (German: [ˈliːt͡sn̩], local dialect [liːɐ̯t͡sn̩]) is a district of the state of Styria in Austria. It is the largest district in Austria, and is divided into two "subdistricts": Bereich Liezen, and Expositur Gröbming. On December 31, 2011 the former third subdistrict Expositur Bad Aussee was abolished.

== Municipalities ==
Since the 2015 Styria municipal structural reform, it has consisted of the following municipalities:

Bereich Liezen:

- Admont
- Aigen im Ennstal
- Altaussee
- Altenmarkt bei Sankt Gallen
- Ardning
- Bad Aussee
- Bad Mitterndorf
- Gaishorn am See
- Grundlsee
- Irdning-Donnersbachtal
- Landl
- Lassing
- Liezen
- Rottenmann
- Sankt Gallen
- Selzthal
- Stainach-Pürgg
- Trieben
- Wildalpen
- Wörschach

Expositur Gröbming:

- Aich
- Gröbming
- Haus im Ennstal
- Michaelerberg-Pruggern
- Mitterberg-Sankt Martin
- Öblarn
- Ramsau am Dachstein
- Schladming
- Sölk

== Municipalities before 2015 ==
Towns (Gemeinden) are indicated in boldface; suburbs, hamlets and other subdivisions of a municipality are indicated in small characters.

=== Bereich Liezen ===
- Admont
  - Aigen, Krumau bei Admont
- Aigen im Ennstal
  - Aich, Aiglern, Fischern, Gatschen, Hohenberg, Ketten, Lantschern, Mitteregg, Quilk, Ritzmannsdorf, Sallaberg, Schlattham, Tachenberg, Vorberg
- Altenmarkt bei Sankt Gallen
  - Essling
- Ardning
  - Frauenberg, Pürgschachen
- Donnersbach
  - Erlsberg, Fuchsberg, Furrach, Ilgenberg, Ritzenberg, Winklern, Planneralm
- Donnersbachwald
- Gaishorn am See
  - Au bei Gaishorn am See
- Gams bei Hieflau
- Hall bei Admont
- Irdning
  - Altirdning, Bleiberg, Falkenburg, Kienach, Raumberg
- Johnsbach
- Landl
  - Großreifling, Kirchenlandl, Krippau, Lainbach, Mooslandl
- Lassing
  - Gatschling, Neusiedl, Sonnberg, Fuchslucken, Heuberg, Schattenberg, Spiegelsberg, Stein, Treschmitz, Trojach, Unterberg, Wieden bei Lassing, Altlassing, Burgfried, Döllach, Lassing-Kirchdorf, Moos, Niedermoos
- **Liezen**
  - Pyhrn, Reithtal
- Oppenberg
- Palfau
- Pürgg-Trautenfels
  - Pürgg, Trautenfels, Unterburg, Untergrimming, Zlem
- **Rottenmann**
  - Bärndorf, Edlach, Singsdorf, Boder, Bruckmühl, Büschendorf, Klamm, Sankt Georgen, Strechau, Strechen, Villmannsdorf
- Sankt Gallen
  - Bergerviertel, Oberreith, Reiflingviertel
- Selzthal
  - Neulassing, Versbichl
- Stainach
  - Niederhofen
- Tauplitz
  - Furt, Klachau, Tauplitzalm
- Treglwang
  - Furth
- Trieben
  - Dietmannsdorf bei Trieben, Sankt Lorenzen im Paltental, Schwarzenbach
- Weißenbach an der Enns
  - Bichl, Breitau, Oberlaussa, Unterlaussa, Wolfsbachau
- Weißenbach bei Liezen
- Weng im Gesäuse
  - Gstatterboden
- Wildalpen
- Wörschach
  - Maitschern
- Altaussee
  - Fischerndorf, Lichtersberg, Lupitsch, Puchen
- **Bad Aussee**
  - Anger, Eselsbach, Gallhof, Gschlößl, Lerchenreith, Obertressen, Reitern, Reith, Sarstein, Unterkainisch
- Bad Mitterndorf
  - Krungl, Neuhofen, Obersdorf, Rödschitz, Sonnenalm, Thörl, Zauchen
- Grundlsee
  - Archkogl, Bräuhof, Gößl, Mosern, Untertressen
- Pichl-Kainisch
  - Kainisch, Pichl, Knoppen, Mühlreith

=== Expositur Gröbming ===
- Aich
  - Aich, Assach
- Gössenberg
  - Auberg, Petersberg
- Gröbming
- Großsölk
- Haus im Ennstal
  - Birnberg, Ennsling, Gumpenberg, Lehen, Oberhaus, Oberhausberg, Weißenbach
- Kleinsölk
- Michaelerberg
  - Pruggern
- Mitterberg
  - Gersdorf, Salza, Strimitzen, Tipschern, Unterlengdorf
- Niederöblarn
  - Gritschenberg, Sonnberg, Straßerberg
- Öblarn
  - Sonnberg
- Pichl-Preunegg
  - Gleiming, Pichl, Preunegg
- Pruggern
- Ramsau am Dachstein
  - Ramsau, Ramsauleiten, Schildlehen
- Rohrmoos-Untertal
  - Fastenberg, Obertal, Rohrmoos, Unterthal
- Sankt Martin am Grimming
  - Diemlern, Oberlengdorf, Salza, Tipschern, Unterlengdorf
- Sankt Nikolai im Sölktal
- **Schladming**
  - Klaus
