= Öblarn =

- Municipality
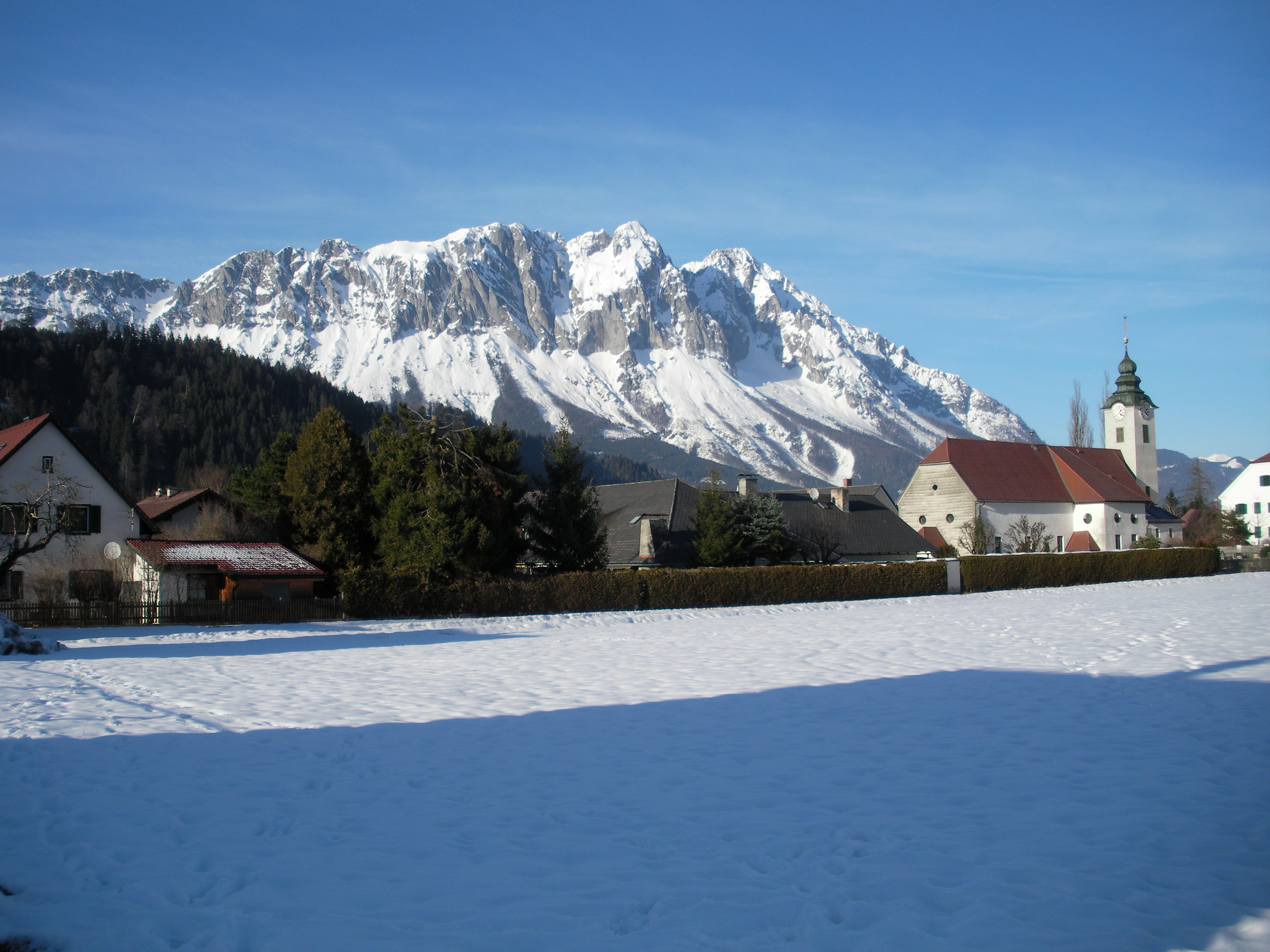
- Church of Saint Andrew

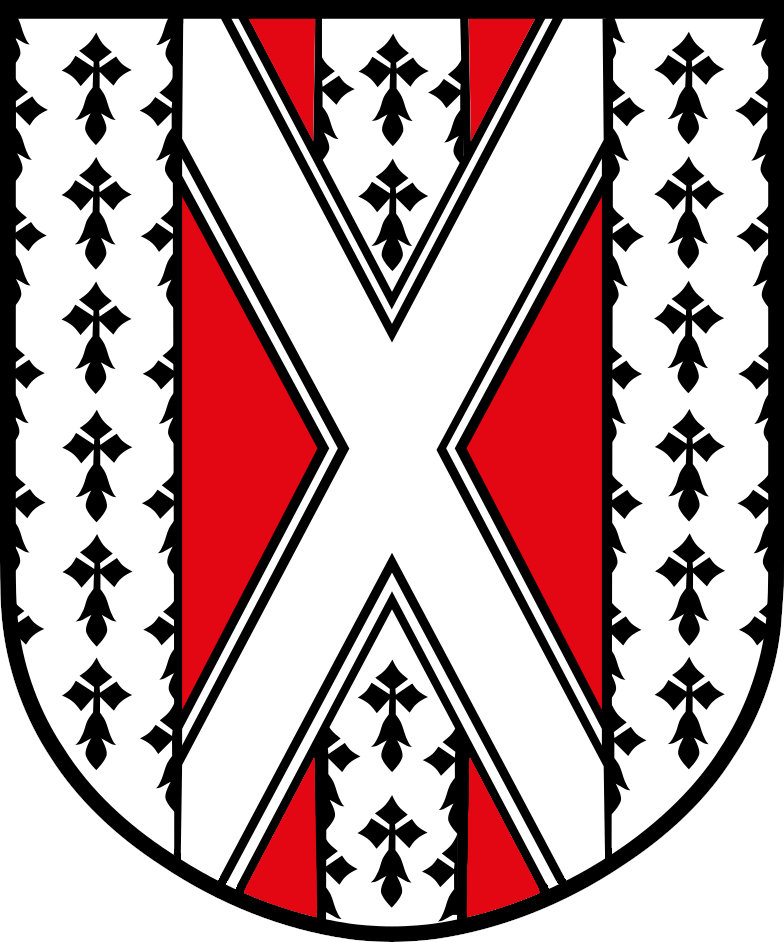
- Coat of arms

- Location within Austria
- Coordinates: 47°27′00″N 14°00′29″E
- Country: Austria
- State: Styria
- District: Liezen

Government
  - Mayor: Franz Zach (ÖVP)

Area
  - Total: 70.1 km^{2} (27.1 sq mi)
- Elevation: 668 m (2,192 ft)

Population (2018-01-01)
  - Total: 2,024
  - Density: 28.9/km^{2} (74.8/sq mi)
- Time zone: UTC+1 (CET)
  - Summer (DST): UTC+2 (CEST)
- Postal code: 8960
- Area code: 03684
- Vehicle registration: GB
- Website: www.oeblarn.at

Öblarn is a market town and municipality in the district of Liezen in Styria, Austria. It is located in the Eastern Alps.
