= Sankt Gallen, Styria =

Sankt Gallen
- Municipality
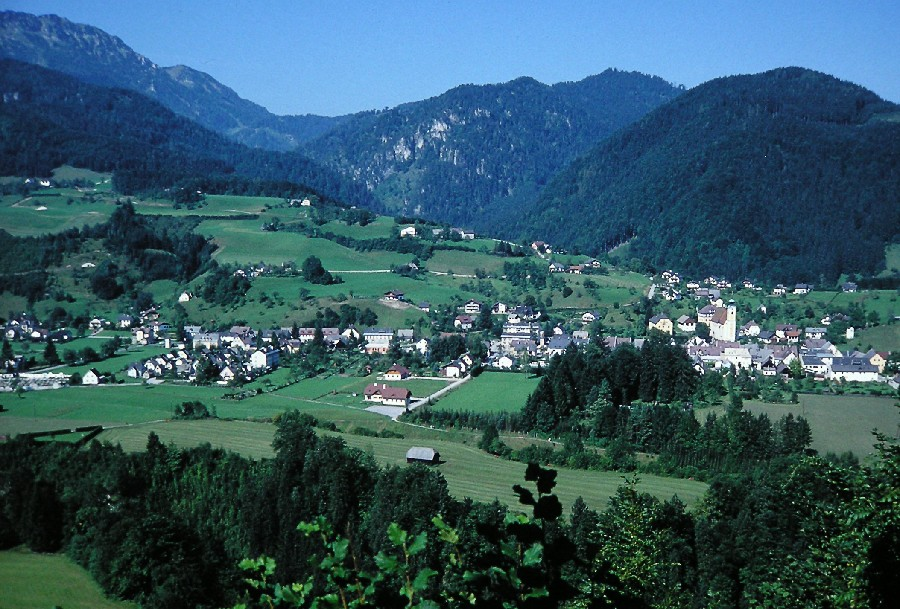

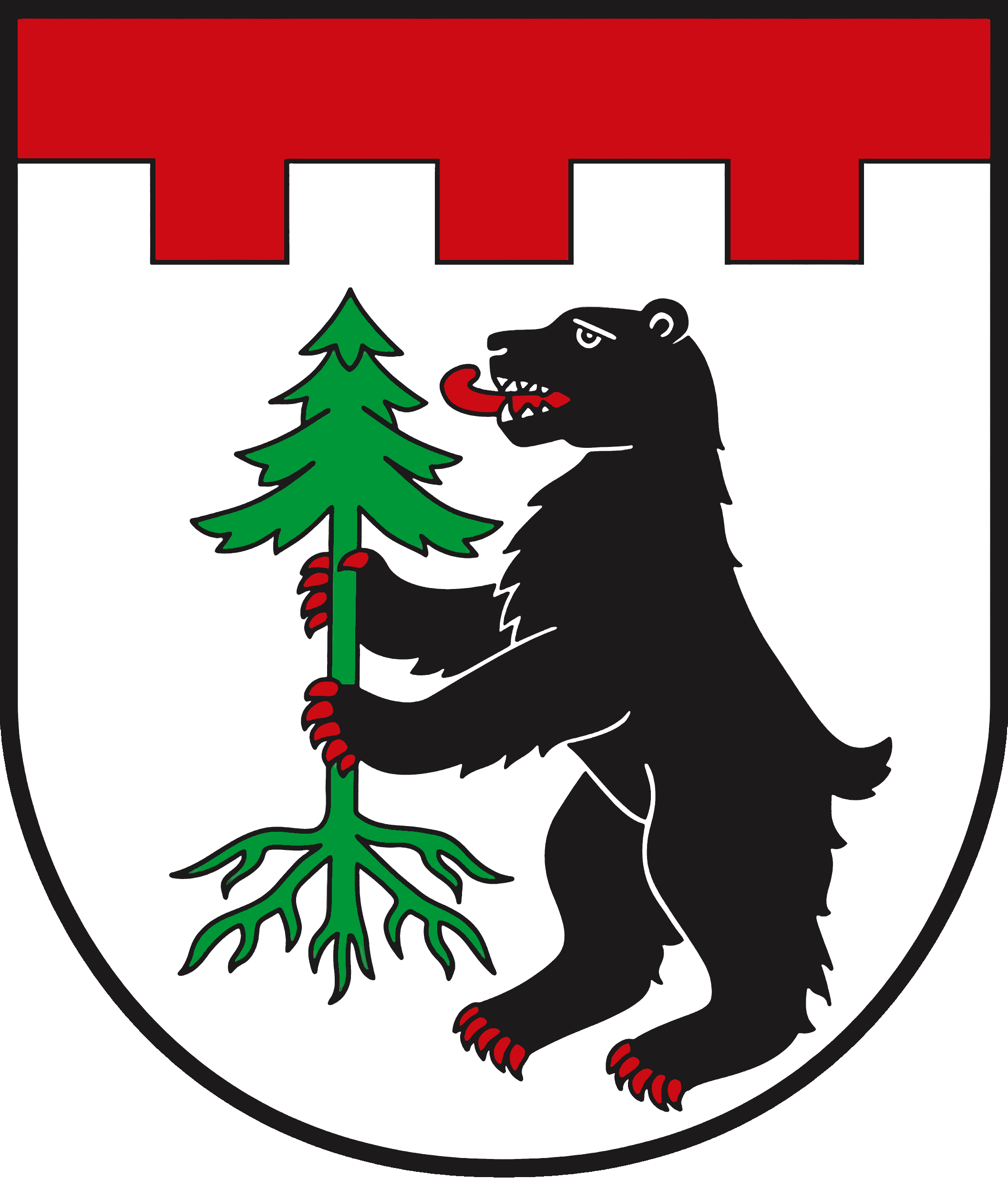
- Coat of arms

- Location within Austria
- Coordinates: 47°41′29″N 14°36′57″E
- Country: Austria
- State: Styria
- District: Liezen

Government
  - Mayor: Eduard Grießl (SPÖ)

Area
  - Total: 129.64 km^{2} (50.05 sq mi)
- Elevation: 513 m (1,683 ft)

Population (2018-01-01)
  - Total: 1,821
  - Density: 14.05/km^{2} (36.38/sq mi)
- Time zone: UTC+1 (CET)
  - Summer (DST): UTC+2 (CEST)
- Postal code: 8933
- Area code: 03632
- Vehicle registration: LI
- Website: www.st-gallen.at

Sankt Gallen (Austrian German: [ˈsaŋkt ˈgalən]) is a municipality in the district of Liezen in the Austrian state of Styria.

== Population ==
Historical population
| Year | Pop. | ±% |
|---|---|---|
| 1869 | 1,297 | — |
| 1880 | 1,189 | −8.3% |
| 1890 | 1,199 | +0.8% |
| 1900 | 1,280 | +6.8% |
| 1910 | 1,329 | +3.8% |
| 1923 | 1,312 | −1.3% |
| 1934 | 1,305 | −0.5% |
| 1939 | 1,386 | +6.2% |
| 1951 | 1,488 | +7.4% |
| 1961 | 1,624 | +9.1% |
| 1971 | 1,696 | +4.4% |
| 1981 | 1,654 | −2.5% |
| 1991 | 1,609 | −2.7% |
| 2001 | 1,517 | −5.7% |
| 2011 | 1,420 | −6.4% |
