= Selzthal =

- Municipality
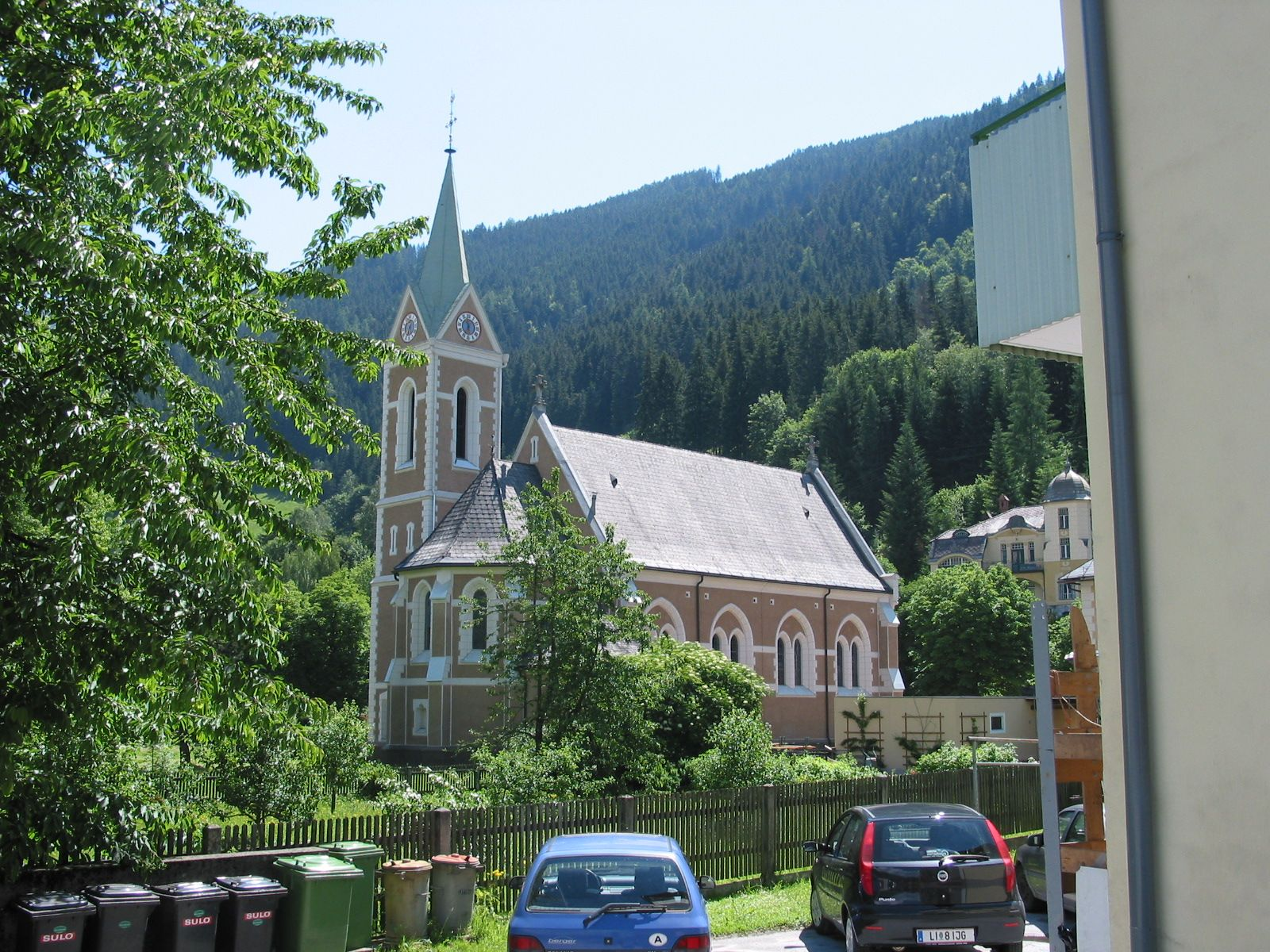

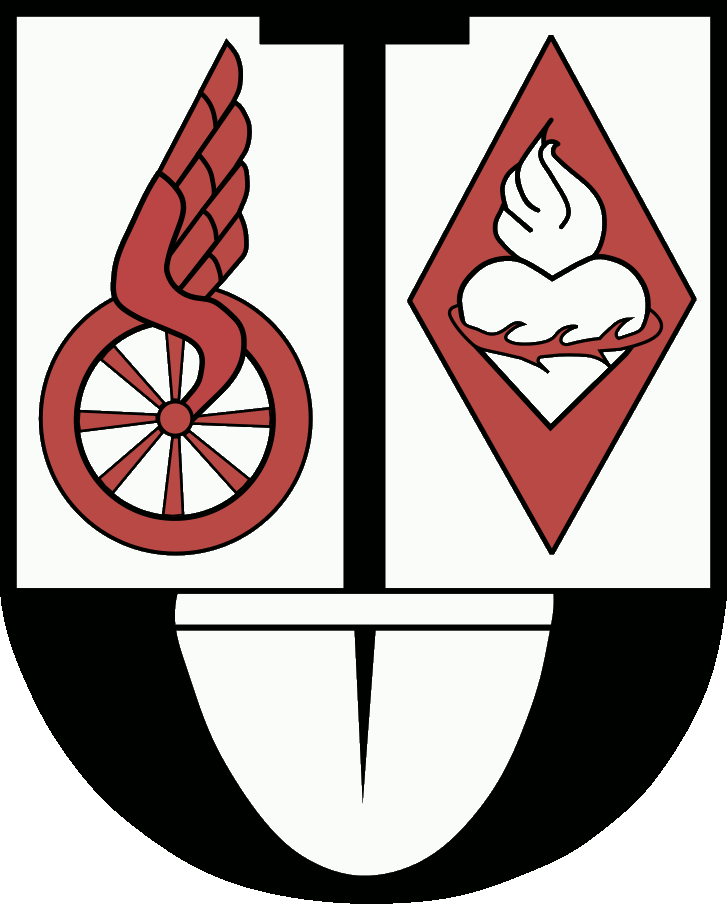
- Coat of arms

- Location within Austria
- Coordinates: 47°33′00″N 14°19′00″E
- Country: Austria
- State: Styria
- District: Liezen

Government
  - Mayor: Gernot Hejlik (SPÖ)

Area
  - Total: 16.71 km^{2} (6.45 sq mi)
- Elevation: 636 m (2,087 ft)

Population (2018-01-01)
  - Total: 1,593
  - Density: 95.33/km^{2} (246.9/sq mi)
- Time zone: UTC+1 (CET)
  - Summer (DST): UTC+2 (CEST)
- Postal code: 8900
- Area code: +43 3616
- Vehicle registration: LI
- Website: www.selzthal.at

Selzthal (Austrian German: [ˈselt͡sˌtaːl]) is a municipality in the district of Liezen in the Austria state of Styria.

== Population ==
Historical population
Year	Pop.	±%
1869	396	—
1880	823	+107.8%
1890	958	+16.4%
1900	1,266	+32.2%
1910	1,697	+34.0%
1923	1,985	+17.0%
1934	1,803	−9.2%
1939	2,208	+22.5%
1951	2,338	+5.9%
1961	2,681	+14.7%
1971	2,547	−5.0%
1981	2,364	−7.2%
1991	2,136	−9.6%
2001	1,947	−8.8%
2011	1,709	−12.2%
2017	1,602	−6.3%
