= Gaishorn am See =

- Municipality
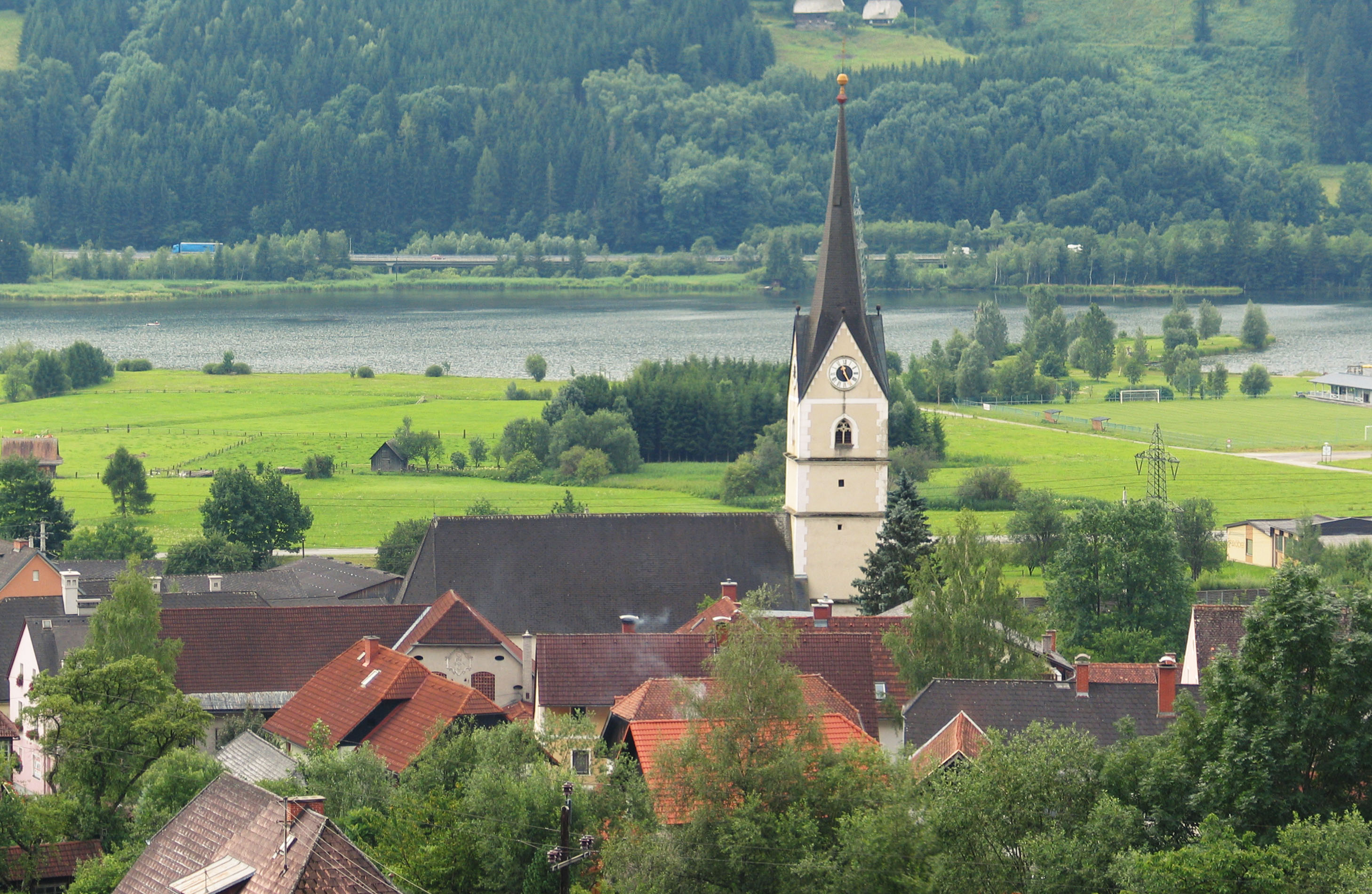
- View with church

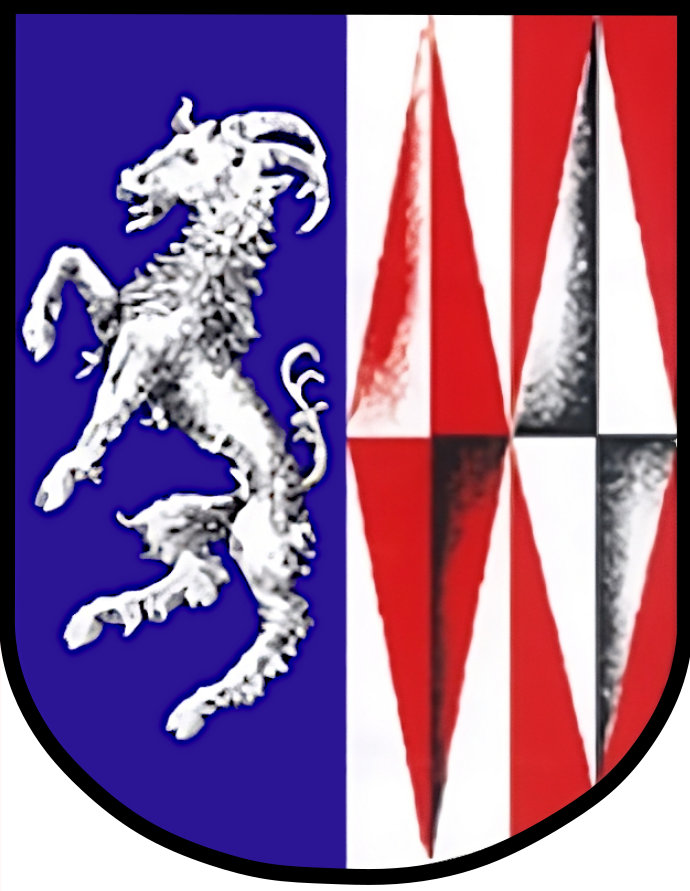
- Coat of arms

- Location within Austria
- Coordinates: 47°29′24″N 14°32′45″E
- Country: Austria
- State: Styria
- District: Liezen

Government
  - Mayor: Werner Haberl (SPÖ)

Area
  - Total: 76.83 km^{2} (29.66 sq mi)
- Elevation: 723 m (2,372 ft)

Population (2018-01-01)
  - Total: 1,333
  - Density: 17.35/km^{2} (44.94/sq mi)
- Time zone: UTC+1 (CET)
  - Summer (DST): UTC+2 (CEST)
- Postal code: 8783
- Area code: 03617
- Vehicle registration: LI
- Website: www.gaishorn-am-see.at

Gaishorn am See (Austrian German: [ɡaɪsˈhɔrn am ˈseː]) is a municipality in the district of Liezen in the Austrian state of Styria.

== Geography ==
Gaishorn lies in the Palten valley surrounded by the Ennstal Alps on the north, the Eisenerz Alps on the east, and the Seckau Alps and the Rottenmanner Tauern on the west. It is on the old Salzstraße from Selzthal to Sankt Michael in Obersteiermark over the Schober Pass.
