= Lassing =

- Municipality
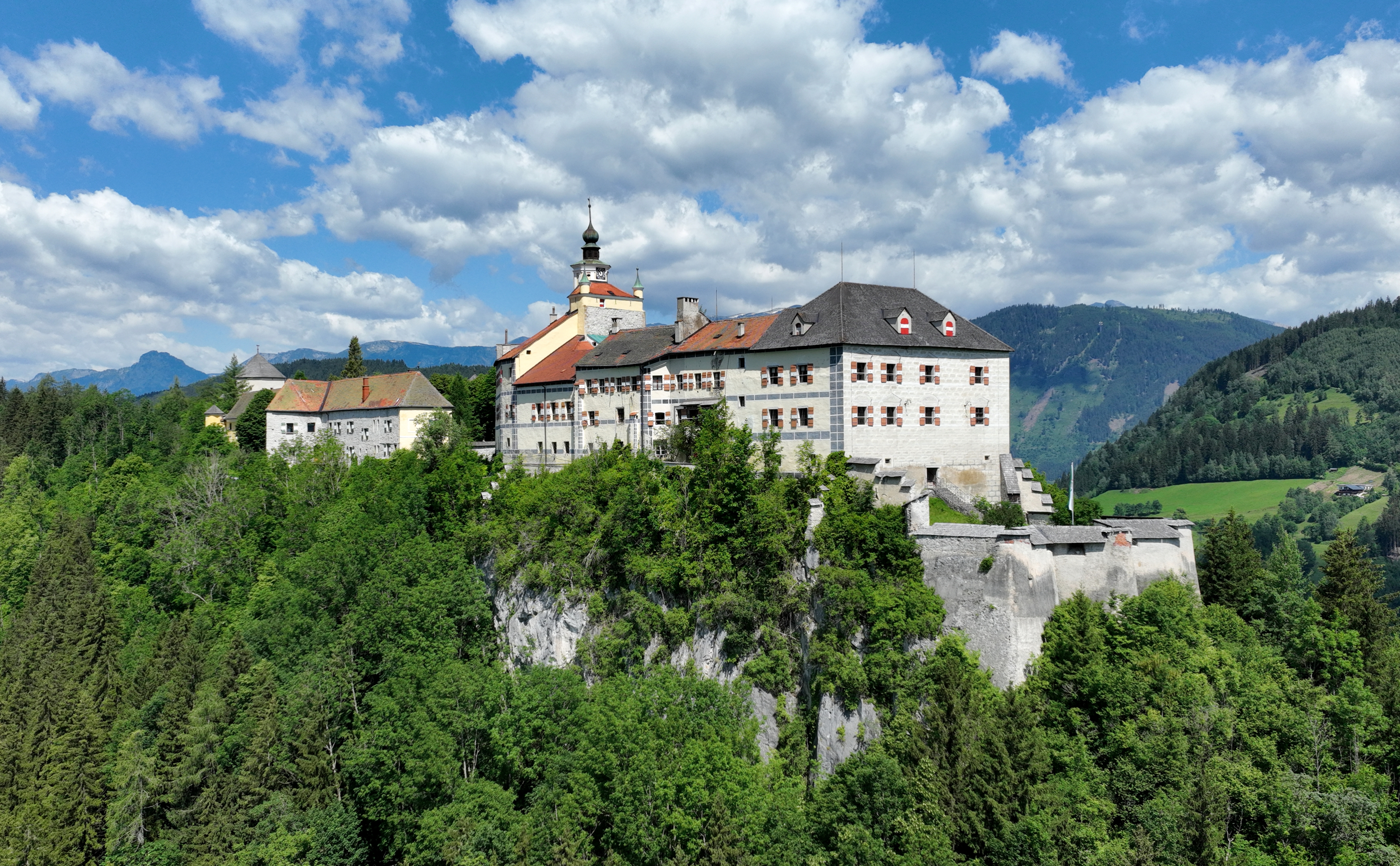
- Strechau Castle

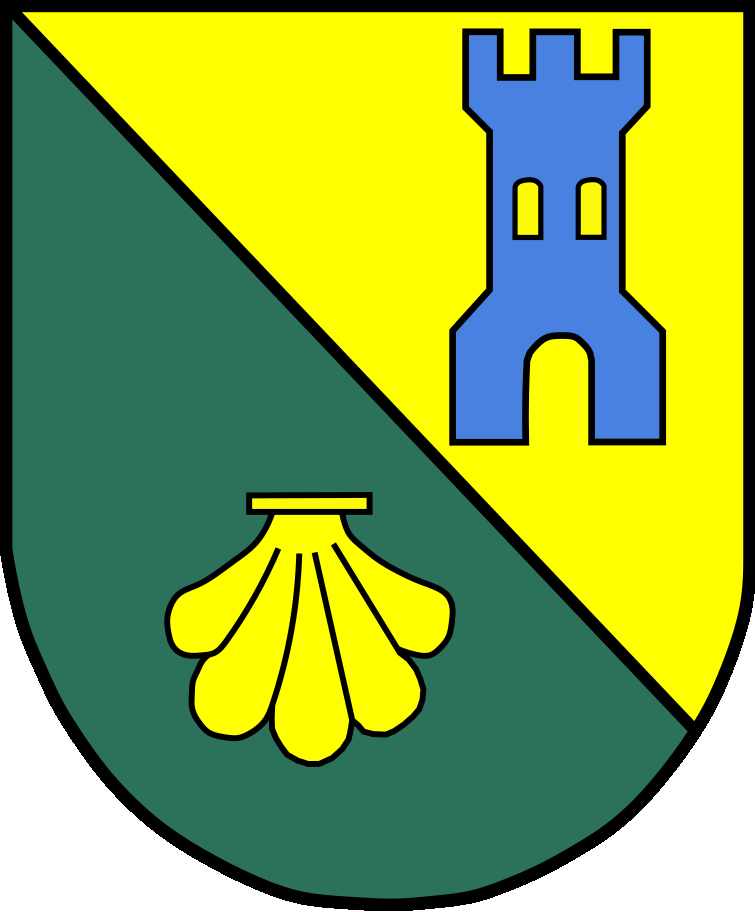
- Coat of arms

- Location within Austria
- Coordinates: 47°31′36″N 14°15′45″E
- Country: Austria
- State: Styria
- District: Liezen

Government
  - Mayor: Friedrich Stangl (ÖVP)

Area
  - Total: 37.15 km^{2} (14.34 sq mi)
- Elevation: 782 m (2,566 ft)

Population (2018-01-01)
  - Total: 1,719
  - Density: 46.27/km^{2} (119.8/sq mi)
- Time zone: UTC+1 (CET)
  - Summer (DST): UTC+2 (CEST)
- Postal code: 8903
- Area code: 03612
- Vehicle registration: LI
- Website: www.lassing.at

Lassing (German: [ˈlasiŋ]) is a municipality in the district of Liezen, Styria, Austria.

On July 17, 1998, a local mine collapsed. One man survived but ten others perished.

== Population ==
Historical population
Year	Pop.	±%
1869	1,950	—
1880	1,933	−0.9%
1890	1,709	−11.6%
1900	1,232	−27.9%
1910	1,185	−3.8%
1923	1,125	−5.1%
1934	1,272	+13.1%
1939	1,415	+11.2%
1951	1,542	+9.0%
1961	1,641	+6.4%
1971	1,662	+1.3%
1981	1,761	+6.0%
1991	1,910	+8.5%
2001	1,852	−3.0%
2011	1,703	−8.0%
