= Aich, Styria =

Aich
- Municipality
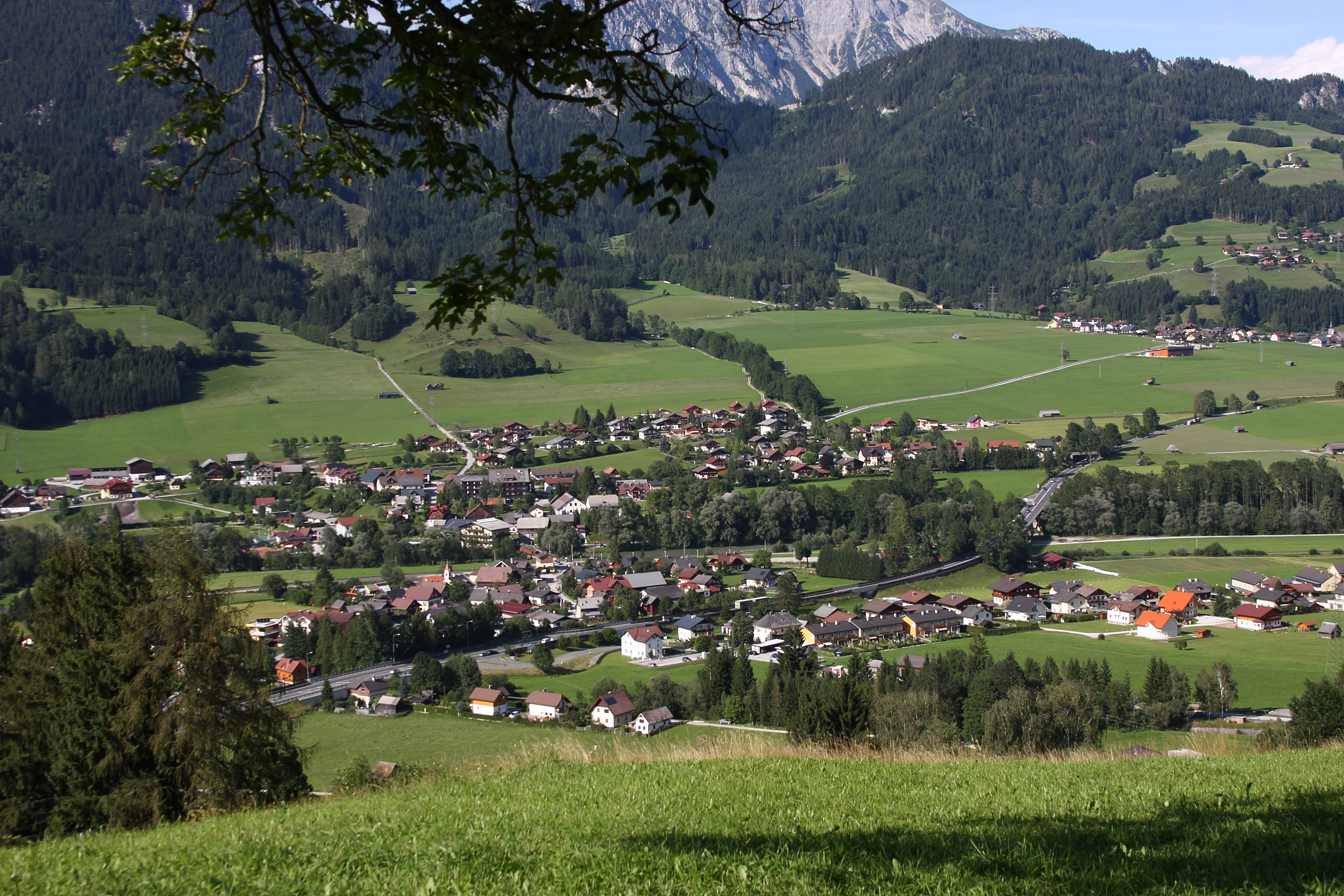
- View of Aich

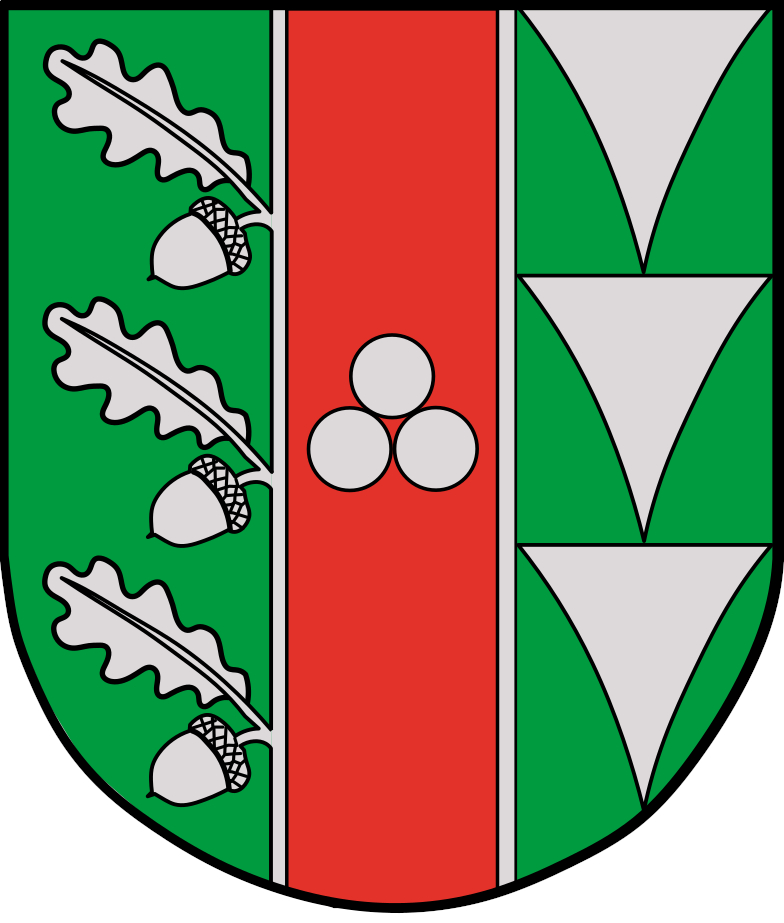
- Coat of arms

- Location within Austria
- Coordinates: 47°25′10″N 13°49′06″E
- Country: Austria
- State: Styria
- District: Liezen

Government
  - Mayor: Franz Danklmaier (ÖVP)

Area
  - Total: 56.59 km^{2} (21.85 sq mi)
- Elevation: 694 m (2,277 ft)

Population (2018-01-01)
  - Total: 1,294
  - Density: 22.87/km^{2} (59.22/sq mi)
- Time zone: UTC+1 (CET)
  - Summer (DST): UTC+2 (CEST)
- Postal code: 8966
- Area code: 03686
- Vehicle registration: GB
- Website: www.aich.at

Aich is a municipality in the district of Liezen in Styria, Austria.
