= Landl =

- Municipality
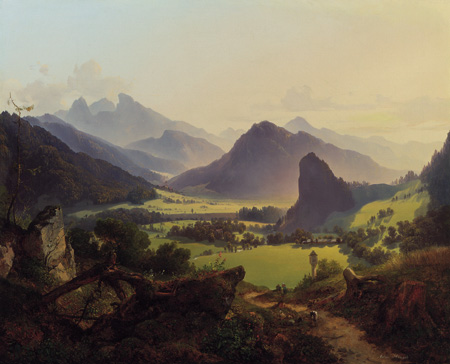
- Looking into the Landl valley of Styria; Anton Hansch, 1837

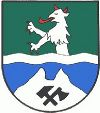
- Coat of arms

- Location within Austria
- Coordinates: 47°39′03″N 14°44′13″E
- Country: Austria
- State: Styria
- District: Liezen

Government
  - Mayor: Bernhard Moser (SPÖ)

Area
  - Total: 254.85 km^{2} (98.40 sq mi)
- Elevation: 520 m (1,710 ft)

Population (2018-01-01)
  - Total: 2,720
  - Density: 10.7/km^{2} (27.6/sq mi)
- Time zone: UTC+1 (CET)
  - Summer (DST): UTC+2 (CEST)
- Postal code: 8931, 8920 Hieflau
- Area code: +43 3633
- Vehicle registration: LI
- Website: www.landl.at

Landl is a municipality in the district of Liezen in the Austrian state of Styria.

== Second World War History ==
Late in the Second World War a group of about 70 Wehrmacht soldiers that were scattered on the march back and were looking for their troop units. They were stopped outside of the village and put before a drumhead court-martial. They were suspected of being deserters, because they were marching unorganized, carrying enemy infantry weapons, marching away from the front, and their papers and orders were disorganized. Being found guilty all men were executed on 12 April 1945. Today their grave stones lay in war graves on a cemetery next to a yellow chapel, a memorial place.

== Geography ==
Landl lies in the Landltal valley near the confluence of the Salza and the Enns.
