= Pürgg-Trautenfels =

- Former municipality
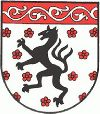
- Coat of arms

- Location within Austria
- Coordinates: 47°32′00″N 14°05′00″E
- Country: Austria
- State: Styria
- District: Liezen

Area
  - Total: 62.69 km^{2} (24.20 sq mi)
- Elevation: 645 m (2,116 ft)

Population (1 January 2016)
  - Total: 891
  - Density: 14.2/km^{2} (36.8/sq mi)
- Time zone: UTC+1 (CET)
  - Summer (DST): UTC+2 (CEST)
- Postal code: 8951
- Area code: 03682
- Vehicle registration: LI
- Website: www.puergg-trautenfels.at

Pürgg-Trautenfels (German: [pʏʁk ˈtʁaʊ̯tn̩ˌfɛls]) is a former municipality in the district of Liezen in Styria, Austria. Since 2015 Styria municipal structural reform, it is part of the municipality Stainach-Pürgg.

== Geography ==
Pürgg-Trautenfels lies in valley of the upper Ennstal between Gröbming and Stainach. The municipal area is bordered in the south by the Enns; in the north it stretches right up to the main ridge Toten Gebirges (Almkogel, 2,116m elevation). The highest point of the municipality is the Grimming (2,351 m) in the west.

== Pürgg ==
The village of Pürgg lies on a small plateau in the south face of the Rantensteins, about 150 m above the valley floor of the brook Grimmingbach. The village has a few narrow streets which are largely for pedestrian traffic only. The houses are situated around two churches:

- Pfarrkirche zum Heiligen Georg (Church of St. George): A Romanesque church which was reputedly established on 17 July 1130. The three-nave church is still standing in its basic structure, however, it was decorated at the beginning of 14th century in the Gothic style.
- Johanneskapelle (Chapel of St. John): A Romanesque chapel on the eastern edge of the plateau, this chapel has frescoes from the 12th century which count among most well preserved in Europe.
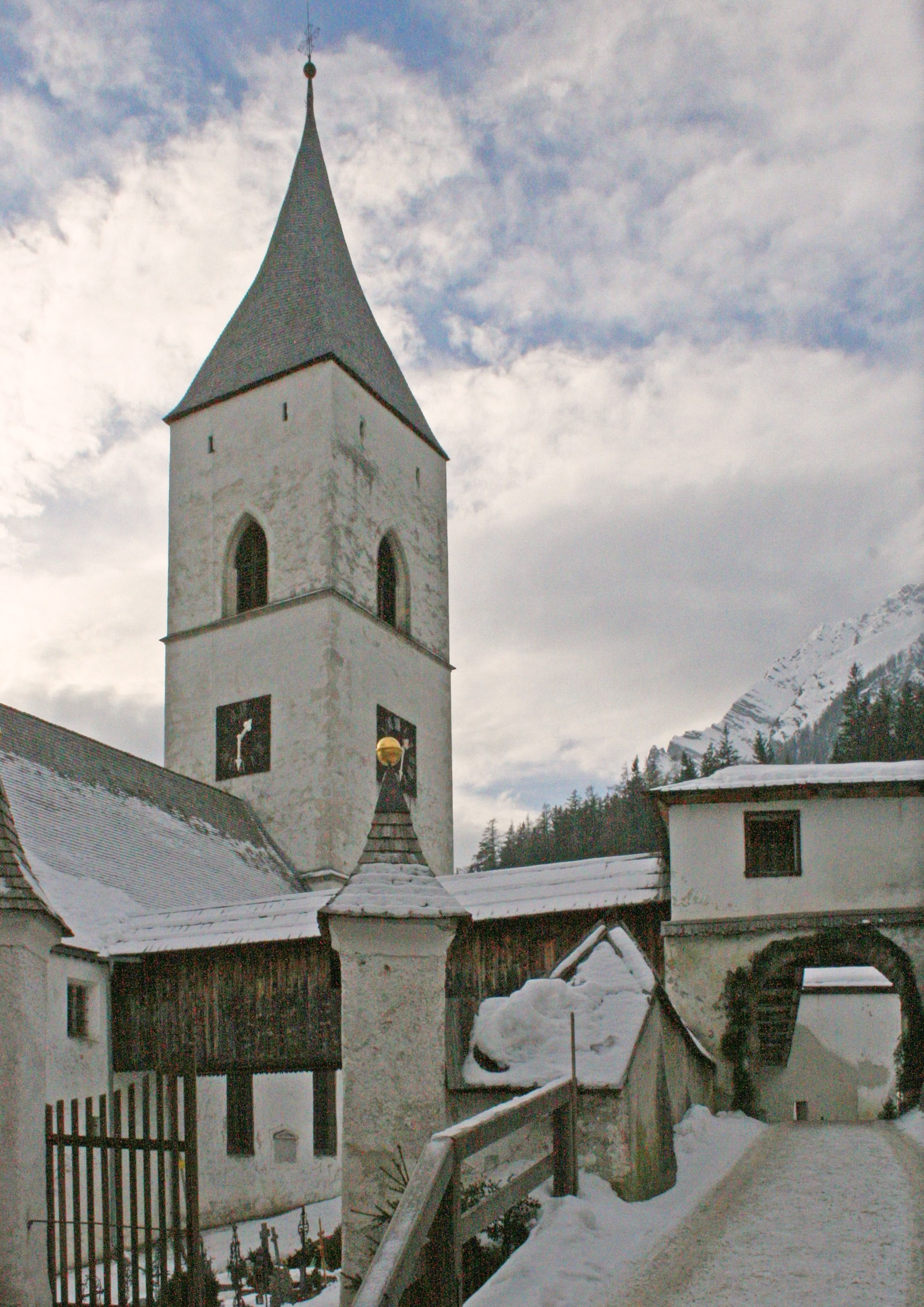
Saint George's church, Pürgg

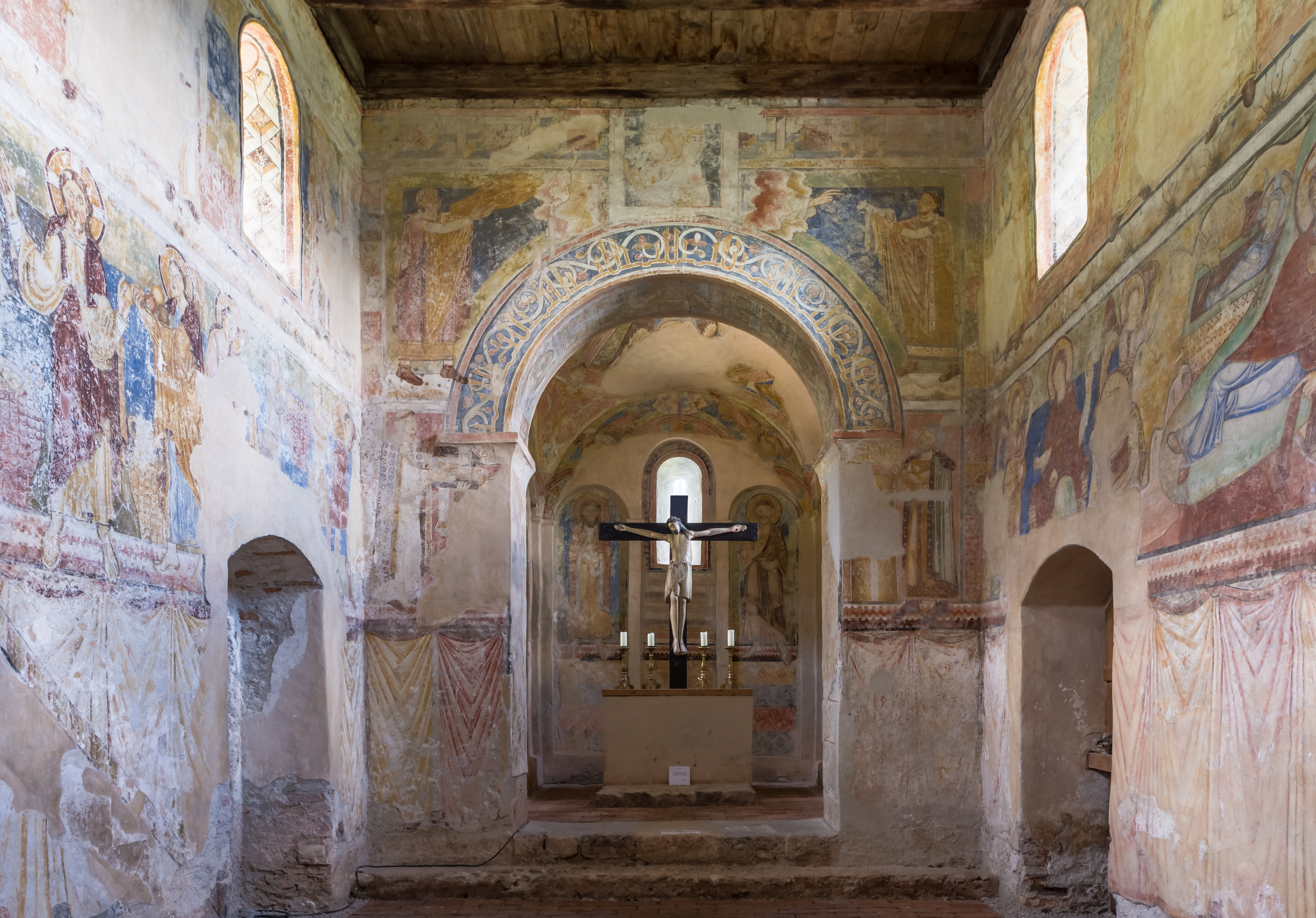
Johanneskapelle interior

== Trautenfels ==
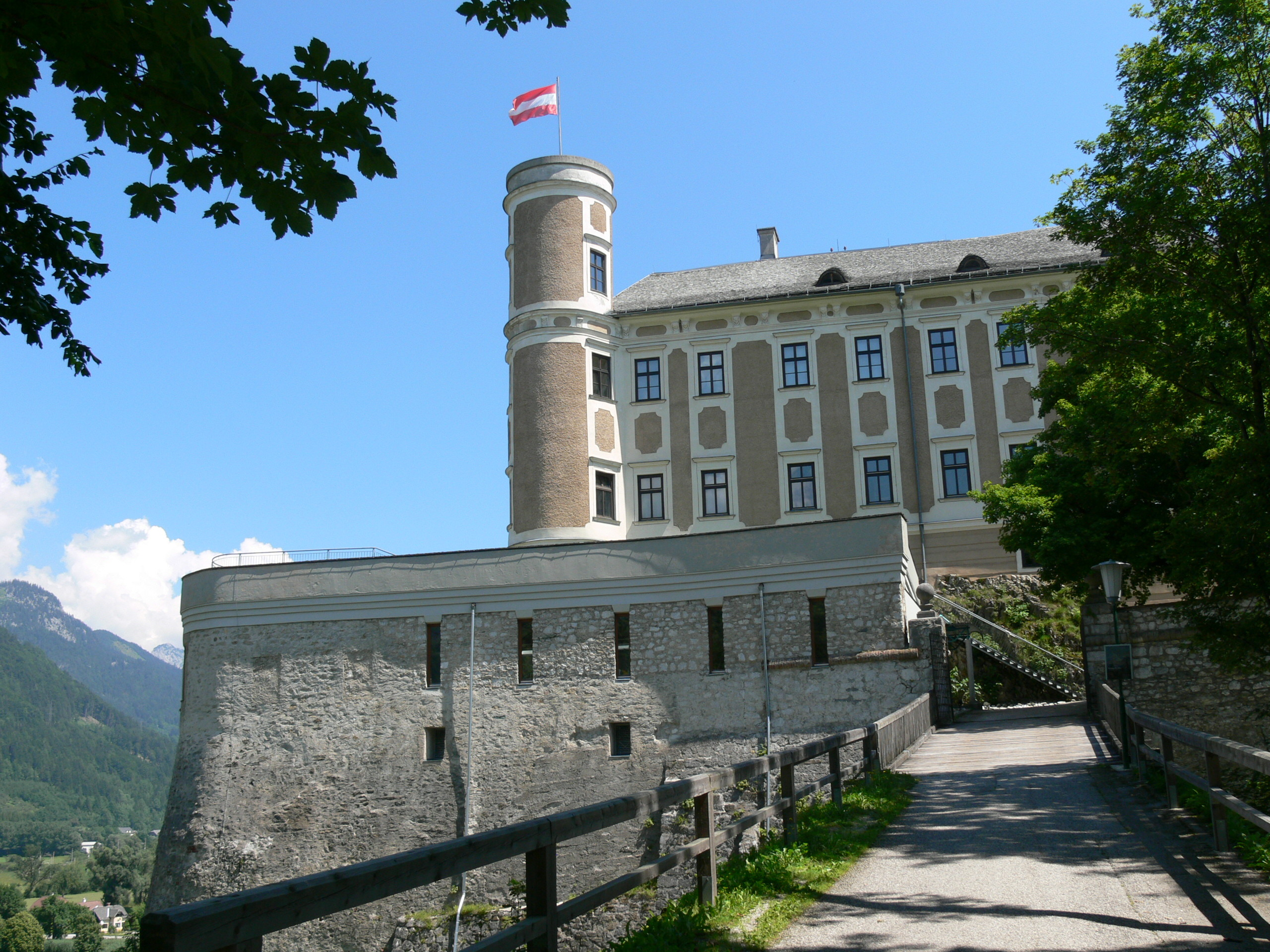
Façade of Schloss Trautenfels

The village of Trautenfels is a small settlement around the Schloss Trautenfels, situated directly on the Enns. The castle is on a small hill which rises about 30 meters above the valley floor. In 1261 it was called a castle (Burg) for the first time. In the baroque era it was given its present appearance by Friedrich von Trauttmannsdorf.

A short distance to the west of the castle, on the same ridge, there lie the ruins of the Protestant church Neuhaus. This was, at the time of the Reformation, the most significant religious center in the Upper Ennstal Valley. The church was established by the castle owners in Trautenfels. But later fell victim to the Counter-Reformation. In 1991, the remnants of the building were exposed and furnished as a memorial.

== Economy ==
Trautenfels Castle and the village of Pürgg attract tourists and day trippers. The region is also visited by climbers, who set out from here on mountain tours to the Grimming, into the Totes Gebirge and the Niedere Tauern to the south. In the Wörschachwald there is a small ski resort and the Spechtensee lake.
