= Schiederweiher =

Lake in Hinterstoder, Upper Austria, Austria

- Schiederweiher with Ostrawitz and Spitzmauer peaks in the background

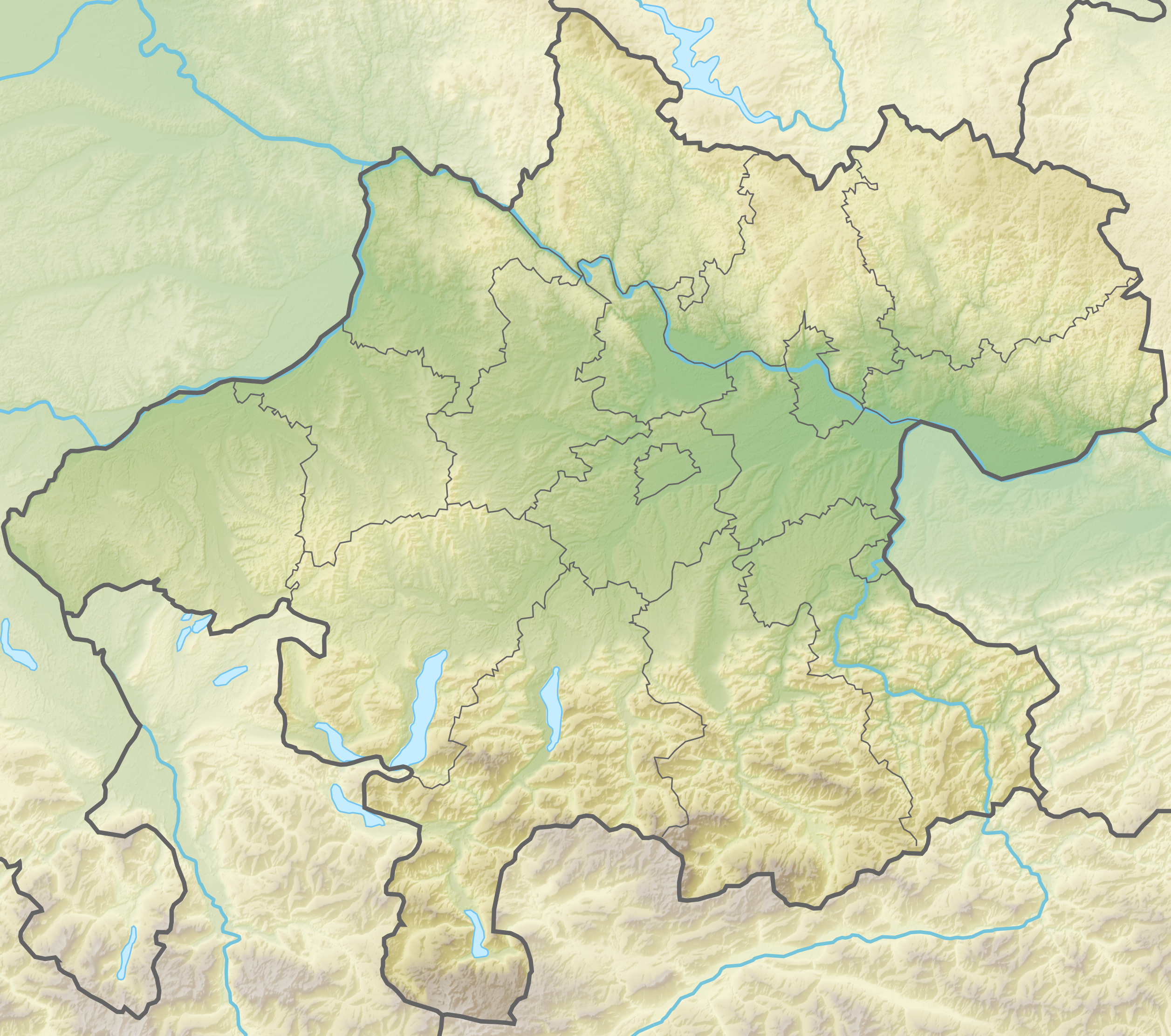
- Location within Upper Austria
- Location: Hinterstoder
- Coordinates: 47°41′29″N 14°07′45″E
- Lake type: artificial
- Primary inflows: Krumme Steyr
- Primary outflows: Krumme Steyr
- Basin countries: Austria
- Max. length: 656 ft (200 m)
- Max. width: 558 ft (170 m)
- Surface area: 0.0081 mi^{2} (2.1 ha)
- Max. depth: 5 ft (1.5 m)
- Surface elevation: 2,008 ft (612 m)

The Schiederweiher (Schieder-Pond) is an artificial lake in Hinterstoder, Upper Austria, created by impounding the river Krumme Steyr. The pond resides at the altitude of 612 m above sea level at the foot of the Großer Priel in the Totes Gebirge mountain range.

It has roughly a surface of 2 ha with a depth of 1 to 1.5 m. The influx takes place via a ditch from the Krumme Steyr and is additionally fed by wells on the pond's bottom. Its drainage back into the Krumme Steyr is regulated by a wooden weir.

The Schiederweiher was formed from 1897 to 1902 by Johann Schieder, k.u.k. master builder. To address the increasing deposition and algae formation, the municipality of Hinterstoder remediated the lake 2004/2005 with support of landowner Duke of Württemberg.

Calcium-rich marl covers the lake bottom where stoneworts and common water-crowfoots grow. The southern bank displays a strip of phragmites, other shores only show sparse patches of common reed and a wet meadow borders in the west. The pond classifies as oligotrophic.

During lake remediation the reed strip and shallow waters were kept intact and in 2005 stocked with river trout, arctic char, coregonus, minnow, bullhead and crayfish.

The purple trail of the Via Alpina passes by the Schiederweiher to the Prielschutzhaus mountain hut.

In 2018 the Schiederweiher was voted most beautiful site in Austria, through the popular vote of the local TV series „9 Plätze – 9 Schätze” (9 sites – 9 treasures)
