= Stainach-Pürgg =

- Municipality
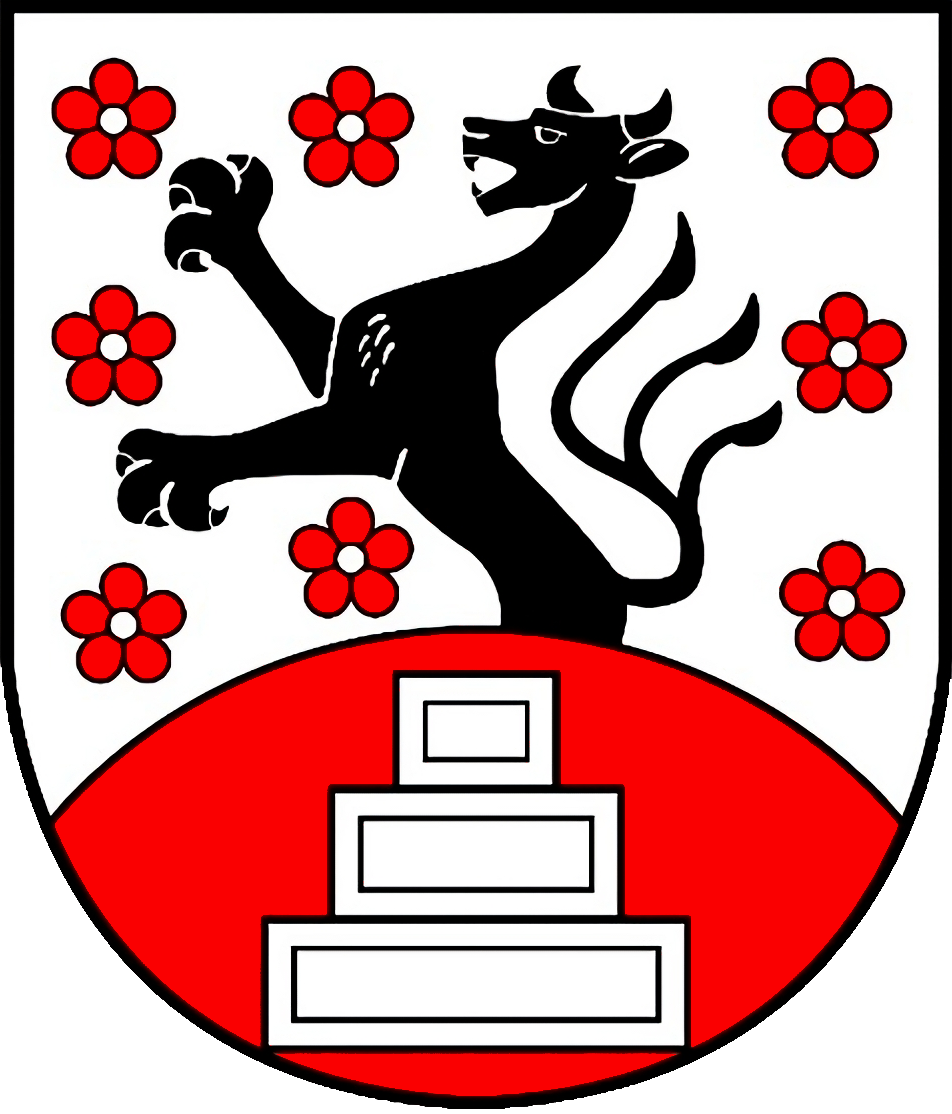
- Coat of arms

- Location within Austria
- Coordinates: 47°32′00″N 14°6′00″E
- Country: Austria
- State: Styria
- District: Liezen

Government
  - Mayor: Roland Raninger (ÖVP)

Area
  - Total: 73.09 km^{2} (28.22 sq mi)
- Elevation: 655 m (2,149 ft)

Population (2018-01-01)
  - Total: 2,850
  - Density: 39.0/km^{2} (101/sq mi)
- Time zone: UTC+1 (CET)
  - Summer (DST): UTC+2 (CEST)
- Postal code: 8950, 8951
- Area code: 03682
- Website: stainach-puergg.gv.at

Stainach-Pürgg is a municipality since 2015 in the Liezen District of Styria, Austria.

It was created as part of the Styria municipal structural reform, at the end of 2014, by merging the former towns Stainach and Pürgg-Trautenfels.

== Geography ==
Stainach-Pürgg is located in Ennstal in the Austrian state of Styria. The municipality territory is bordered at the south by the Enns River, and in the north by the Totes Gebirge. The highest point of the municipality is Grimming (2.351 m), as the highest free-standing Bergstock of Europe, in Westen.

=== Municipality arrangement ===
The municipality territory includes the following seven sections (populations as of 2015):

- Niederhofen (58)
- Pürgg (177)
- Stainach (1899)
- Trautenfels (153)
- Unterburg (284)
- Untergrimming (132)
- Zlem (165)

The municipality consists of the four Katastralgemeinden: Neuhaus, Pürgg, Stainach and Zlem.

== History ==
On the rocky back of "Purgstallhöhe" mountain stood the castle Grauscharn (also Gruscharn, slav. Grusch = Geröll) from the Middle Ages. This was already in 1160 the Pfalzburg by Margrave Ottokar III, and thus dominion center for the county Ennstal. The village "Gruscharn", which had formed within sight of the castle, was finally called "Stainach" in 1659. The local community of Stainach, as an autonomous body, was established in 1850.

From the area of the former castle Grau-Scharn, today only the St. Johns chapel (Johanneskapelle) has remained, which was built in the 12th century. The style of their paintings indicates their origin to 1160/65, which the existing building confirms. Already in 1183 are on the Church and Castle Burgstall. Pürgg was returned to this parish and was originally the seat of an archdeacon (archpriest). The parish Sprengel extended once far beyond Aussee lake. In 1490 the parish was owned by the Knights of St. George, in 1599 by the Jesuits of Graz. Since 1958, the then independent Stainach site has also been the seat of its own parish.

Construction of the Enns Valley Railway in 1875 opened up the present hamlets Stainach and Trautenfels with suitable rail stops. The trainstop in Trautenfels was leveled however in the year 2007. The construction of the Salzkammergut railway in 1877, also a bus stop in Pürgg and Stainach station (now called Stainach-Irdning) emerged and became the railway junction.

After the annexation of Austria in 1938, today's municipal territory came to the Reichsgau of Styria. From 1945 to 1955, it was part of the British occupation zone in Austria. Since then, the municipal area belongs to Styria.

The town Stainach-Pürgg, in its present form, was created only at the beginning of the year 2015. It was part of the Styrian municipality structural reform, in which the independent municipalities Stainach and Pürgg-Trautenfels were merged.

== Culture and sights ==
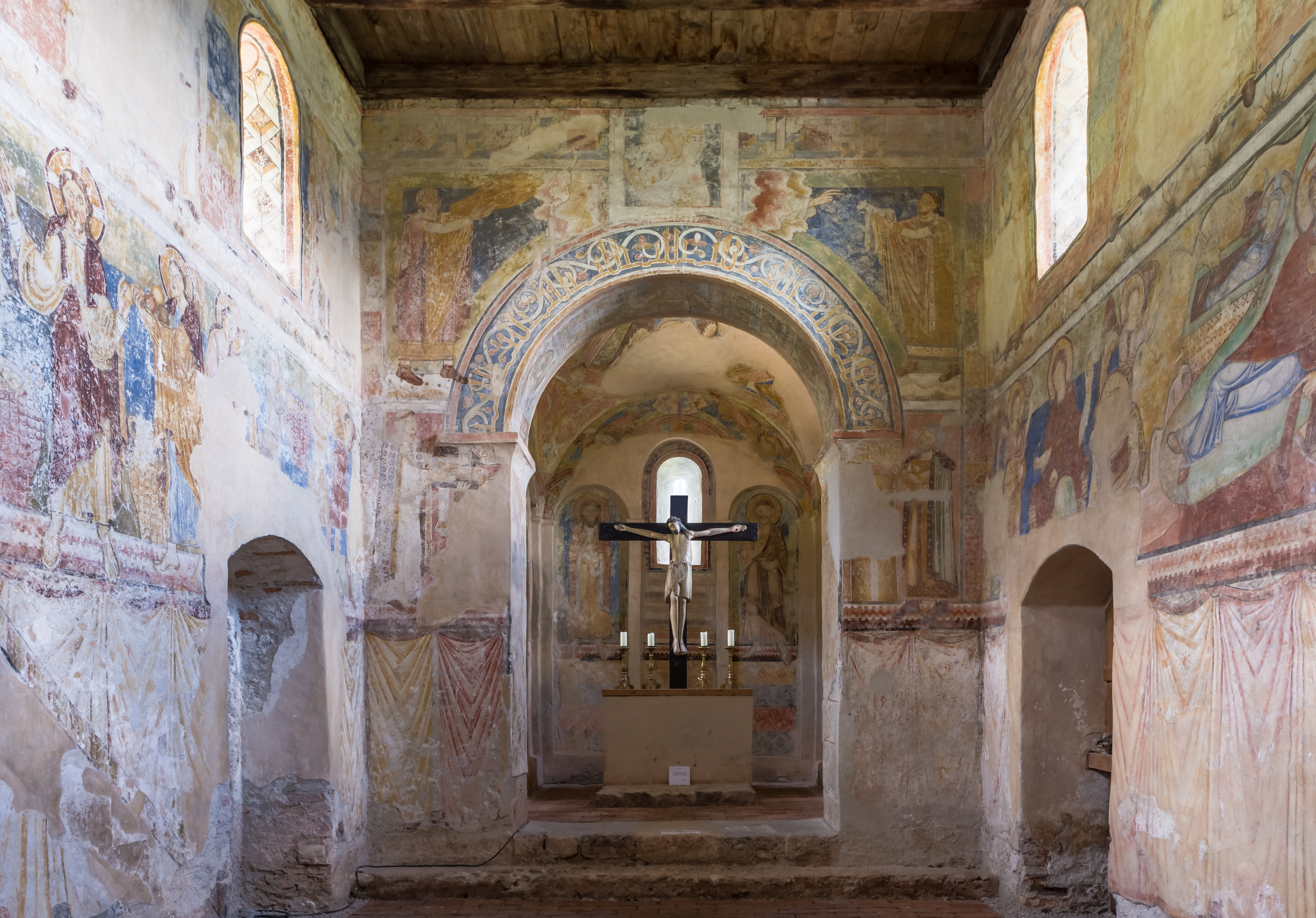
Romanesque Chapel of St. John in Pürgg, Styria, Austria. The frescos date from the 12th century, probably around 1160, the crucifix from the 11th century

== Economy and infrastructure ==
In addition to tourism, the food industry is an important economic factor for the municipality.

== Tourism ==
Schloss Trautenfels and the picturesque hamlet of Pürgg have attracted numerous tourists and excursionists. In addition, the area is popular for mountain climbers, who climb the Grimming, the Totes Gebirge mountains, and in the southern Niedere Tauern. In Wörschachwald is a small winter sports area and the Spechtensee lake, a popular destination. Therefore, it is not surprising that the municipality has numerous inns and hostels.

== Industries ==
The local industrial enterprises deal with food processing:

- Ennstal Milch KG, dairy (Maresi etc.)
- Landena KG, food industry

=== Transportation ===
The place is home, with the Stainach-Irdning Station, to an Austrian railway junction. Here the Salzkammergutbahn runs onto the Enns Valley Railway. In addition, there is a stop of the Salzkammergutbahn in Pürgg.

An important road junction is in the hamlet of Trautenfels. This is where the main connecting route from Salzburg to Graz (Ennstal Road B 320) joins the Salzkammergut Road B 145, which leads to the Salzkammergut.

=== Town offices ===
The town is the seat of the local agricultural authority.

=== Education ===
The town situates a federal gymnasium school and a federal realgymnasium.

== Notable residents ==
- Adolf Adam (1918–2004), computer scientist and statistician
- Grete Dierkes (1882–1957), actress and singer
- Robert Gattinger (1902–1980), painter and graphic artist
- Pope Gregory V (972–999), first pope from the area of modern Austria
- Karl von Winckler (1912–1988), entrepreneur and businessman
