= Spechtensee =

Lake in Styria, Austria

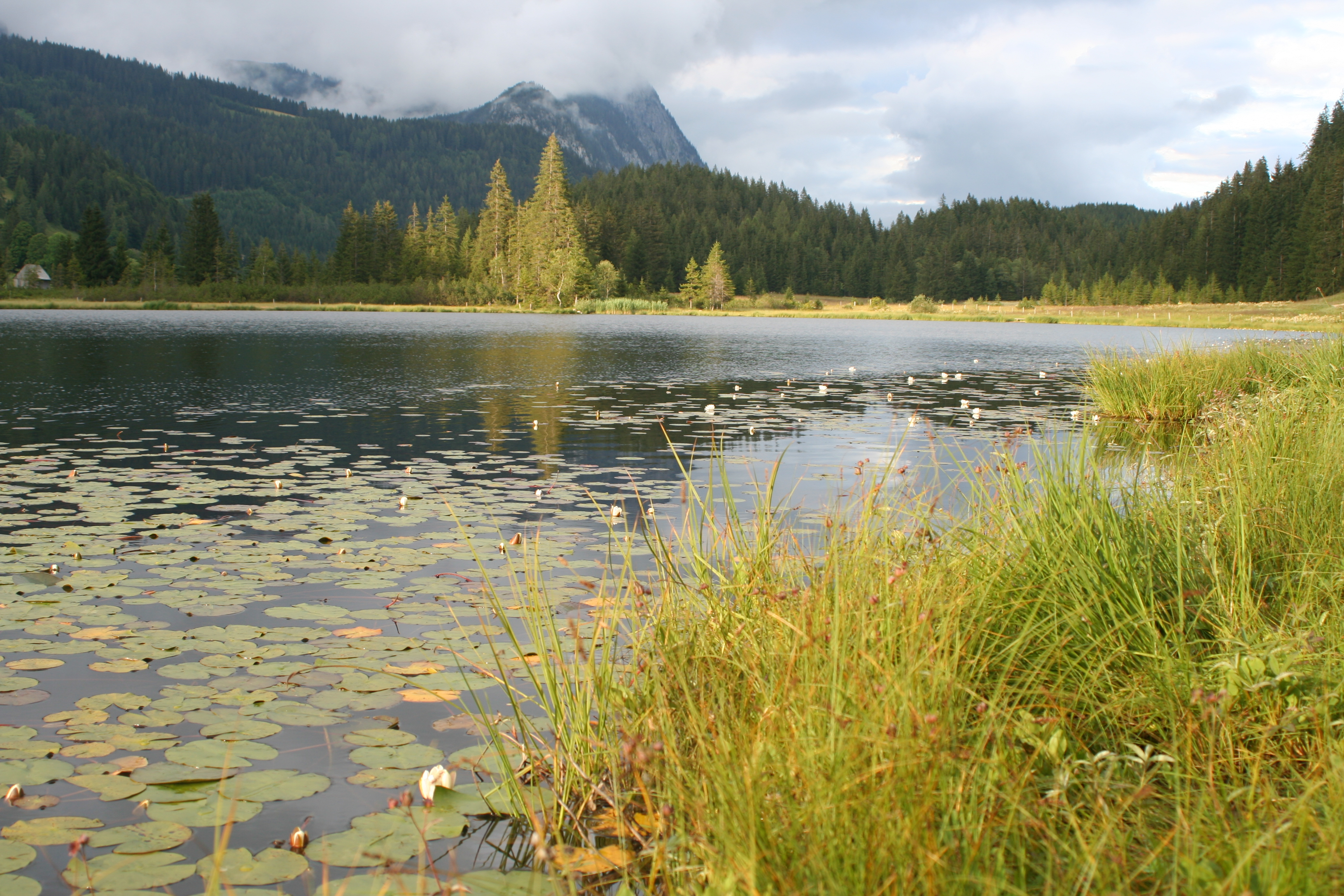
- The Spechtensee, looking east

- Location within Styria
- Location: Totes Gebirge, Styria, Austria
- Coordinates: 47°33′34″N 14°05′52″E
- Primary outflows: Wörschachbach
- Max. length: 250 m (820 ft)
- Max. width: 150 m (490 ft)
- Surface area: 3.5 ha (8.6 acres)
- Max. depth: 8 m (26 ft)
- Surface elevation: 1,051 m (3,448 ft)

The Spechtensee is a lake in Styria, Austria.

The lake is situated at the southern edge of the Totes Gebirge mountains in the parish of Pürgg-Trautenfels near the municipality Wörschachwald. The lake is named after the Specht family, former residents in Stainach who lived on the so-called Spechtengut (Specht Estate) (nowadays Schloss Sonnhof (Sonnhof Manor House)) until the end of the 19th century. The Spechtensee was part of the estate.

The lake is drained by the Wörschachbach, which flows through the gorge of Wörschach Gorge into the Enns valley. It has a maximum depth of eight metres (26 ft), according to other sources eleven metres (36 ft). The lake, which can be as warm as 23 °C (73 °F) in summer, is also used as a swimming lake. On its northern shore is a bathing area and in the middle of the lake a small bathing platform is anchored. In the vicinity of the lake there is the Spechtensee Hut, a mountain hut belonging to the Austrian Alpine Club. There is a circular walk around the lakeside.

== Flora and fauna ==
On the eastern side of the lake there is a fen that transitions with a floating mat into the open waters of the lake. There is another important floating mat on the western lakeshore. The European white water lily flourishes in the southern part of the lake and signal crayfish are bred here. Fish species of the Spechtensee include river trout and rainbow trout as well as tench, rudd, roach, European chub and northern pike.

== Geology ==
The lake is located amongst moraines from the Würm glaciation which seal the bottom of the lake and did create the depression for the lake with their embankments. In addition around the lake are conglomerates of the mainly Late Cretaceous Gosau Group.
