= Spitzmauer =

Coordinates: 47°41′48″N 14°3′42″E

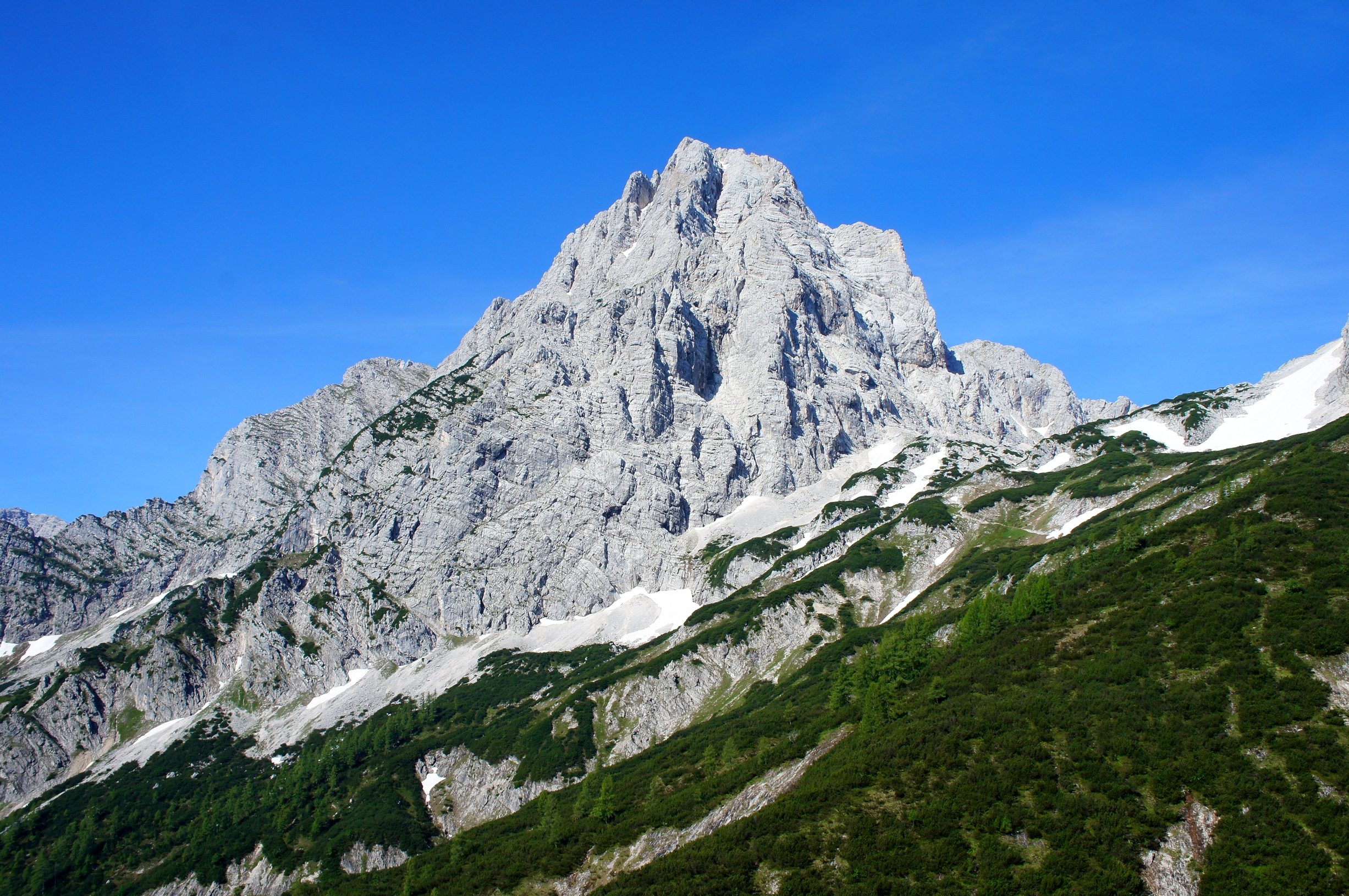
The Spitzmauer, from the north-east

With its summit at 2,446 metres (8,025 ft) above sea level, the Spitzmauer (lit. translatable as "sharp/steep wall") is the second highest mountain of the Totes Gebirge mountain range in the south of Upper Austria. A Dachstein Formation, the mountain was first touristically climbed by Vienna botanist Karl Stoitzner, school teacher H. Langeder, and mountain guide Matthias "Haarschlager" Hotz on 23 July 1858. It took several more years until a passage through the sharp, name-giving, eastern wall was found by Robert Damberger and Hans Kirchmaier in 1906.

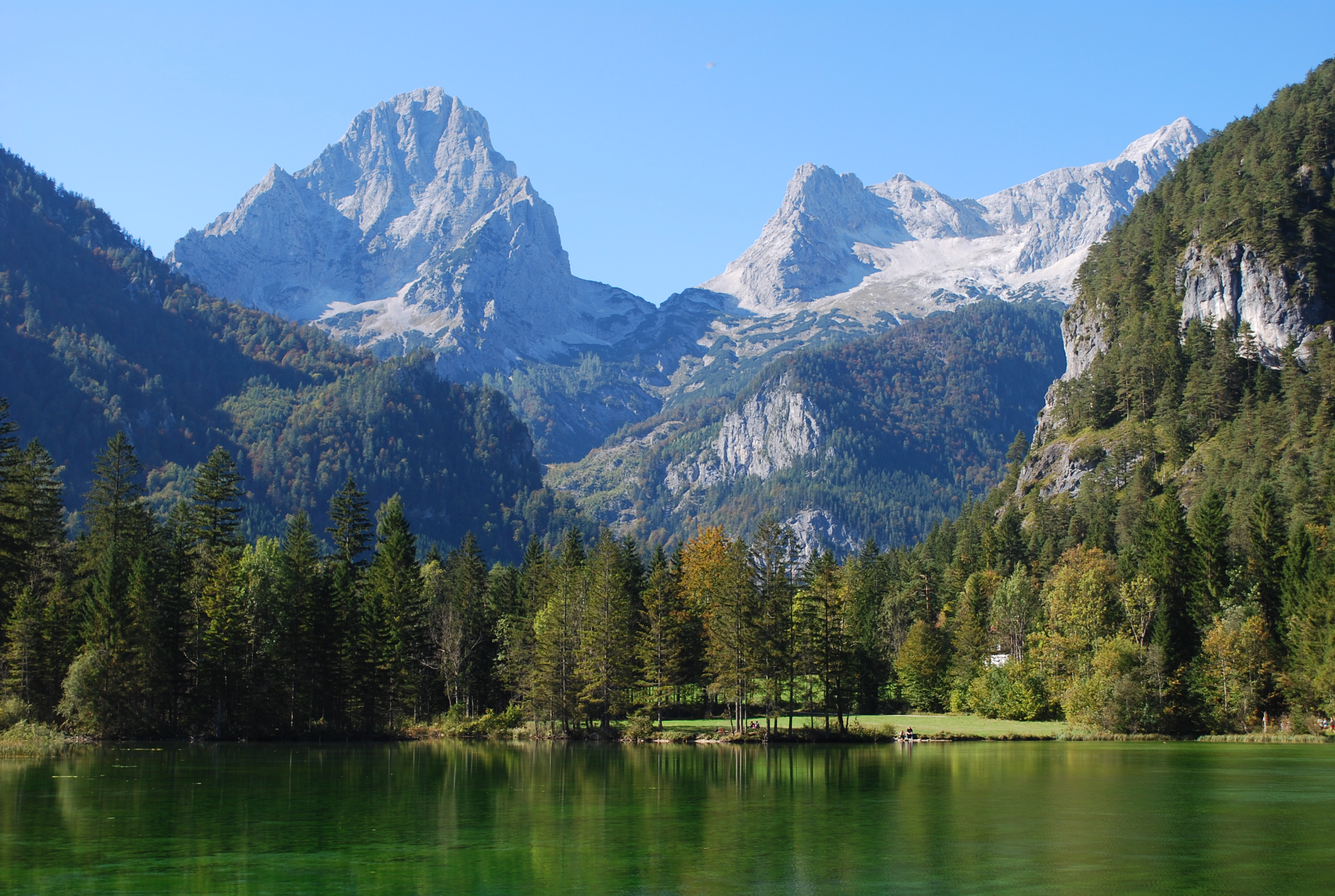
Spitzmauer (left) next to the Brotfall (middle) and the Großer Priel (far right), as seen from the Schiederweiher

The most common climbing route takes around four hours, starts in Hinterstoder and passes the Prielschutzhaus mountain hut. A more challenging route starts in Grünau im Almtal and passes the Welser Hut.

On 20 March 1942, during World War II, a military plane of the Junkers Ju 52 type crashed into mountain in dense fog, en route from Wiener Neustadt to Munich. All four crew members were killed. The plane was only discovered by tourists almost 2 months later, on May 10 because parts of the plane were sticking out of the snow. The bodies of the crew members and important parts of the plane were recovered nine days later. While most of the remaining debris was buried, some is still visible from the hiking trails. A memorial cross close to the site carries a license plate from one of the aircraft's units. One part of the landing gear is used as a trail blaze.

The diary of one of the team members involved in the recovery effort reads:

Aufstieg zur Maschine mit Rettungsschlitten zum Bergen der Toten. Es waren ein Feldwebel und ein Obergefreiter. Beide brachten wir mittels Schlitten, auf die sie mit Lawinenschnur befestigt waren, ins Tal zur Polsterlucke. Dort wurden die Toten in Zinnsärge gelegt. Nach Beenden der Arbeit kleines Bad im Schneewasser der krummen Steyr. Am übernächsten Tag Aufstieg zur Spitzmauer. Suche nach MG und Fallschirm.- Ohne Seil – MG – Trommel mit Munition gefunden. Vermeintlicher Fallschirm entpuppte sich als Nachthemd... Am Samstag Abtransport der Laufräder mit Ochsen. Schwere Schufterei. Dauernd bis zum Bauch im Schnee. Viel Schweiß ist geflossen...

Which translates to:

Ascent to the machine with rescue sledges to recover the dead. There was a sergeant and a lance corporal. We took both of them down into the valley to the Polsterlucke using sledges to which they were attached with avalanche cord. There the dead were placed in tin coffins. After the work was finished, we had a little dip in the snow water of the crooked Steyr. The day after next, ascent to the Spitzmauer. Search for machine gun and parachute - without rope - machine gun drum with ammunition found. Supposed parachute turned out to be a nightshirt... On Saturday, removal of the wheels with oxen. Hard labour. Up to our stomachs in snow all the time. A lot of sweat flowed...
