= Hinterstoder =

- Municipality
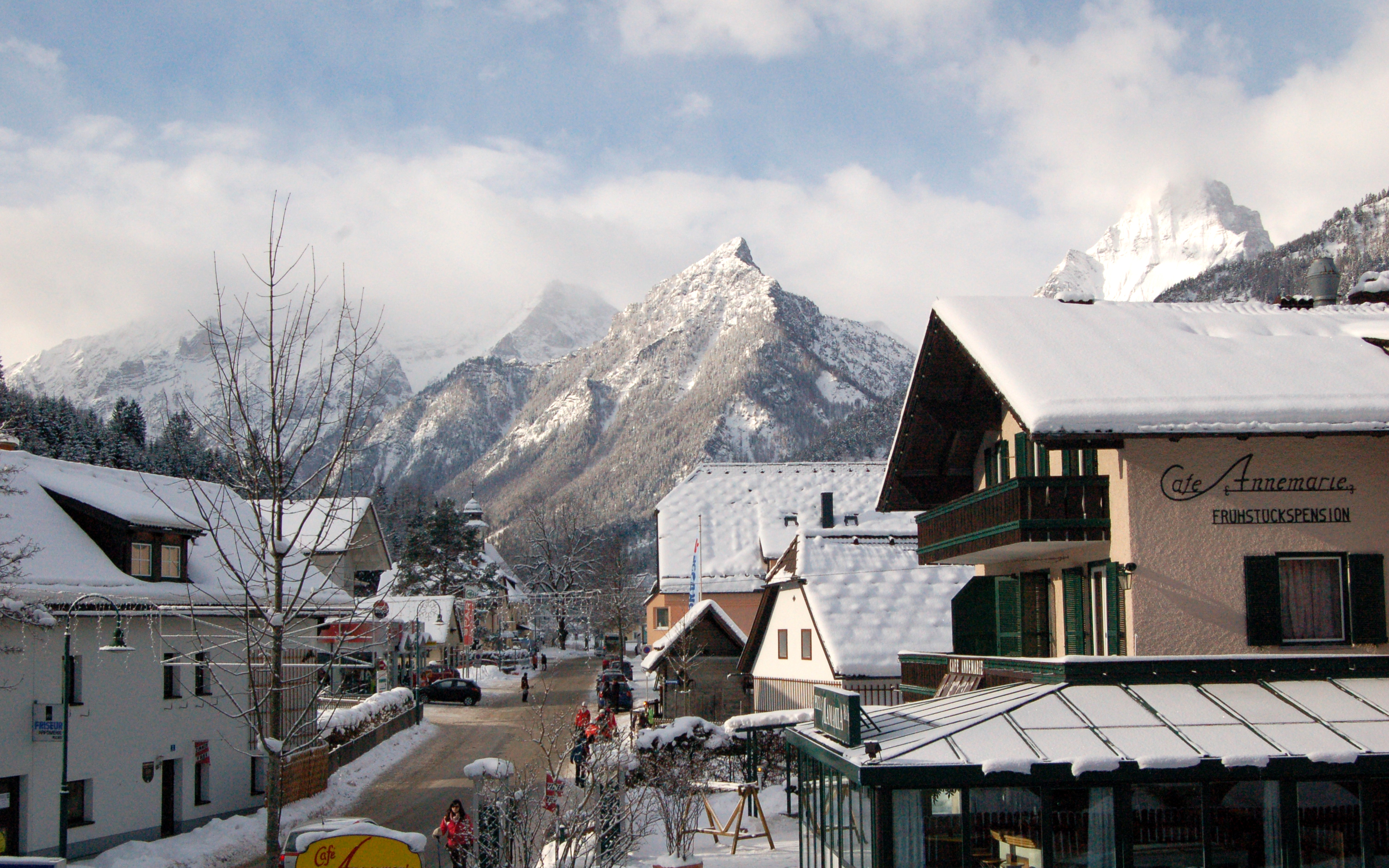
- Main street of Hinterstoder, February 2010

- Coat of arms

- Location within Austria
- Coordinates: 47°41′47″N 14°08′58″E
- Country: Austria
- State: Upper Austria
- District: Kirchdorf an der Krems

Government
  - Mayor: Helmut Wallner (ÖVP)

Area
  - Total: 149.71 km^{2} (57.80 sq mi)
- Elevation: 591 m (1,939 ft)

Population (2018-01-01)
  - Total: 910
  - Density: 6.1/km^{2} (16/sq mi)
- Time zone: UTC+1 (CET)
  - Summer (DST): UTC+2 (CEST)
- Postal code: 4573
- Area code: 07564
- Vehicle registration: KI
- Website: www.hinterstoder.ooe.gv.at

Hinterstoder is a municipality in the district of Kirchdorf an der Krems, in the Austrian state of Upper Austria. The village lies on the southern edge of the district near the border with Styria, at an altitude of around 600 m. Surrounded by the limestone peaks of the Totes Gebirge range, including the Großer Priel (2,514 m) and the Spitzmauer (2,446 m), Hinterstoder has developed from a small alpine settlement into an internationally recognized ski resort.

== Geography ==
The municipal territory includes the villages of Hinterberg, Hinterstoder, Mitterstoder and Hintertambergau. The Steyr River rises nearby and flows through the valley. Hinterstoder is noted for the Schiederweiher, a small artificial lake created in the late 19th century that has become a local landmark.

The surrounding mountains, including the Kleiner Priel (2,134 m) and the Warscheneck (2,389 m), make the area popular for hiking, climbing, and skiing. The climate is alpine, with cold winters and relatively mild summers.

== History ==
The first settlers were Slavic-speaking groups, as indicated by the name Stoder, attested in documents from 1240, which derives from a Slavic root meaning "cold" or "stony ground". During the 12th century the region was incorporated into the Duchy of Austria after conquest from the Duchy of Bavaria.

Tourism began in the late 19th century: the first recorded overnight stays date from 1890, a police station opened in 1897, and the Pyhrn Railway reached the valley in 1906. Skiing spread rapidly after 1910, and the first organized ski race took place on 10 December 1912.

== Economy and tourism ==
Hinterstoder’s economy relies heavily on tourism, particularly winter sports and alpine recreation. The ski resort on the Höss mountain offers slopes for all levels, complemented by summer hiking trails and alpine huts. Traditional farming, forestry, and small-scale services also contribute to the local economy.

== Sports ==
Hinterstoder is internationally known as a venue for FIS Alpine Ski World Cup races. The first World Cup event was held in 1986. Growing demands for modern race infrastructure led to construction of a new World Cup course on the Höss in 2004.

The "Hannes Trinkl World Cup Run", named after the local downhill skier, was inaugurated in the 2006–07 season. At 2,250 m in length with gradients up to 60%, the piste meets standards for Super-G, giant slalom, and slalom events. The finish arena was designed for optimal spectator access and viewing. Hinterstoder successfully hosted multiple World Cup meetings, including in 2011 and 2020.

== Culture and landmarks ==
Notable landmarks include the parish church of St. Leopold, the Schiederweiher pond, and the panoramic alpine meadows of the Höss. Local cultural traditions combine Upper Austrian and Styrian influences, with annual folk festivals and alpine herding customs.

== Transport ==
Hinterstoder is accessible via the Pyhrn Autobahn (A9) and by rail through the nearby Hinterstoder station on the Pyhrn Railway, which connects to Linz and Graz. Shuttle buses link the station with the ski area.
