= Trautenfels Castle =

- Schloss Trautenfels
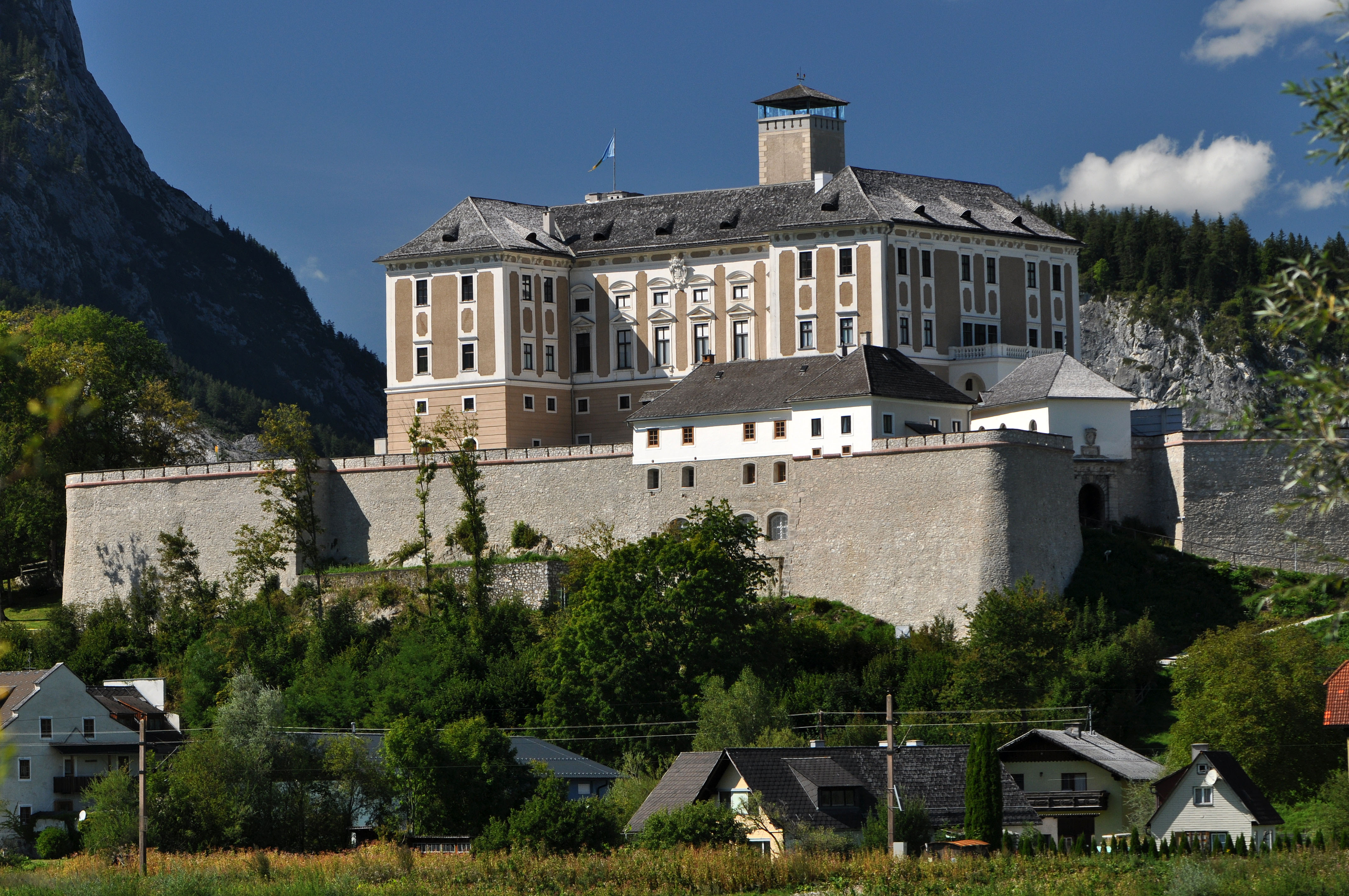
- Trautenfels Castle
- Interactive map of the Trautenfels Castle area

General information
- Type: palace
- Architectural style: Gothic and Baroque
- Location: Trautenfels, Styria, Austria
- Coordinates: 47.518889°N 14.080833°E
- Elevation: 673 m (2,208 ft)
- Current tenants: Regional Landscape Museum of the Joanneum
- Construction started: before 1260 (medieval construction), 1670 (Baroque construction)
- Completed: 1672 (current baroque form)
- Client: Universalmuseum Joanneum
- Owner: The State of Styria

Design and construction
- Architect: Manfred Wolff-Plottegg (for 1988–92 renovation)
- Other designers: Carpoforo Tencalla

Trautenfels Castle (German: Schloss Trautenfels) is a palace located in the district of Liezen in Styria. It lies directly on the Enns at 673m in the municipality Pürgg-Trautenfels on a cliff protrusion at the foot of the Grimming.

== History ==
The first documented mention of a construction at the crossroads of the Salzstrasse with the stretch through the Ennstal Valley dates from 1260 to 1262. The medieval construction served as a dam until the 16th century and was known as the Neuhaus. Most notable among the 16th century accouterments are the Renaissance frescoes. They were likely created by a northern Italian artist on the occasion of the then owner, Ferdinand Hoffman's, wedding to Margarete von Harrach in 1563. The Styrian provincial governor, Count Siegmund Friedrich von Trauttmansdorff acquired the castle in 1664. He had the building renovated and expanded into a palace after the fashion of the Baroque between 1670 and 1672 and at this time it was given the name, Schloss Trautenfels. The mighty rectangular construction with (roofed) courts and a high tower accommodates a significant interior decoration (1670 to 1673) with frescoes by Carpoforo Tencalla in the first floor. The free standing castle chapel as well as five bastions are also worth mentioning.

After passing through numerous owners, the palace was bought by Josef Count Lamberg in 1878. After the Second World War the Styrian Youth Hostel Association (Jugendherbergswerk) acquired the palace and managed it until 1983. At this time the palace came into the possession of the municipality of Pürgg-Trautenfels and the state of Styria. Its renovation and the revitalization for use as a museum occurred from 1988 to 1992 based on plans by the architect, Manfred Wolff-Plottegg. In 1992, the Steierische Landesausstellung (Styrian Provincial Exhibition) took place here. Today the palace is home of the Regional Landscape Museum of the Universalmuseum Joanneum.

== Landscape Museum ==
The palace holds a permanent show collection of about 1000 exhibits dealing with both the natural and the cultural history of the Ennstal Valley as well as the Ausseerland region. In addition, the Antler Room of the Counts of Lamberg, the splendid Marble Hall and the richly decorated State Rooms are also open to visitors.

== Church ruins ==
A few metres west of the palace on the same ridge lie the ruins of the Protestant church of Neuhaus. At the time of the Reformation this was the most significant religious centre of the upper Ennstal valley. The church was established by the lords of Schloss Trautenfels but fell victim shortly thereafter to the particularly potent Counter-Reformation in the Duchy of Styria. In 1991 the remnants of the building were excavated and serve today as a memorial.

== Trivia ==
In honor of the castle the Bremer shipping company Deutsche Dampfschifffahrts-Gesellschaft "Hansa" (DDG-Hansa) has given her 1975 newly acquired heavy-lift ship the name Trautenfels.

== Gallery ==
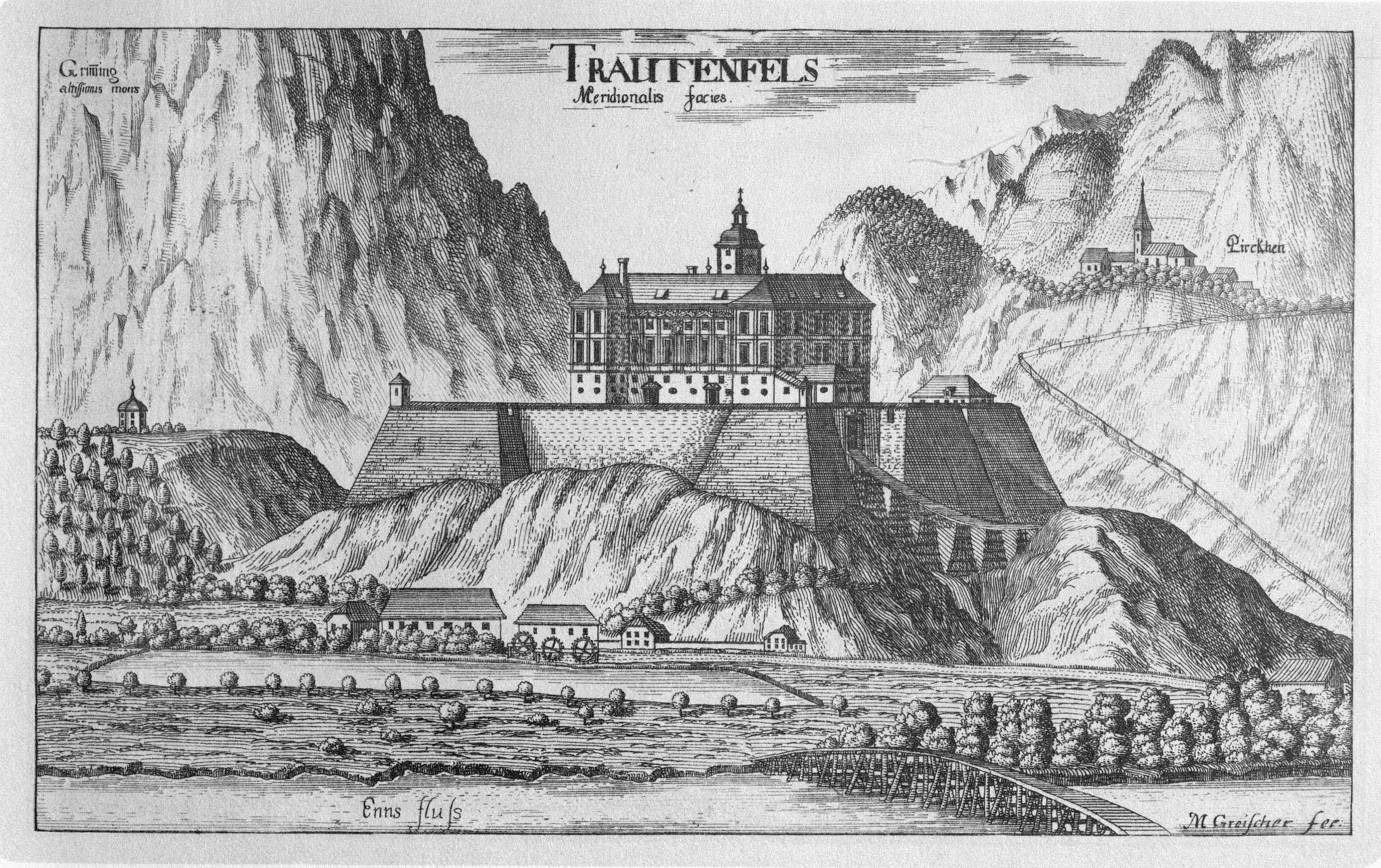
Käyserlichen Geographi, Topographia Ducatus Stiriae by G. M. Vischers, 1681

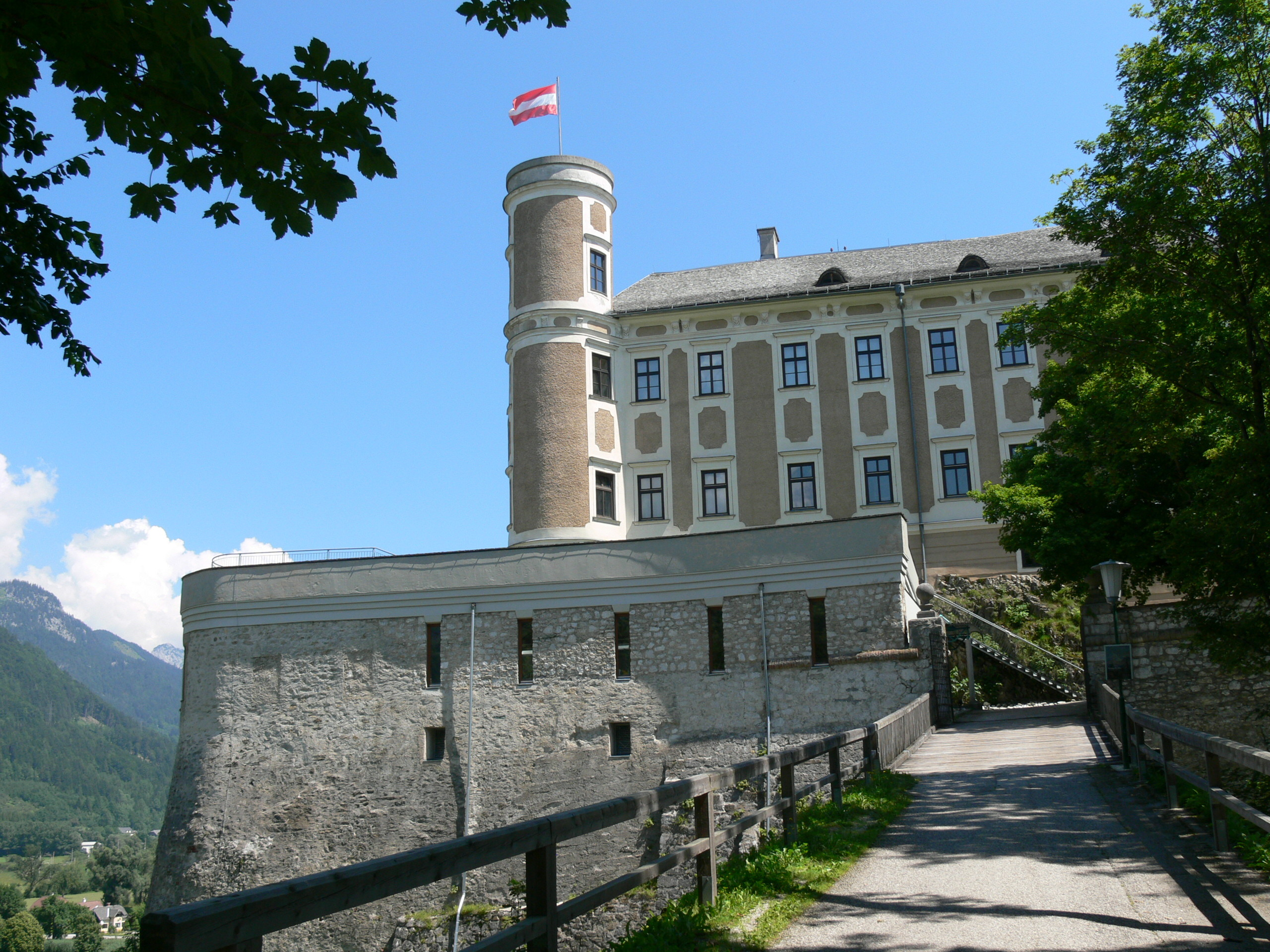
Trautenfels Castle

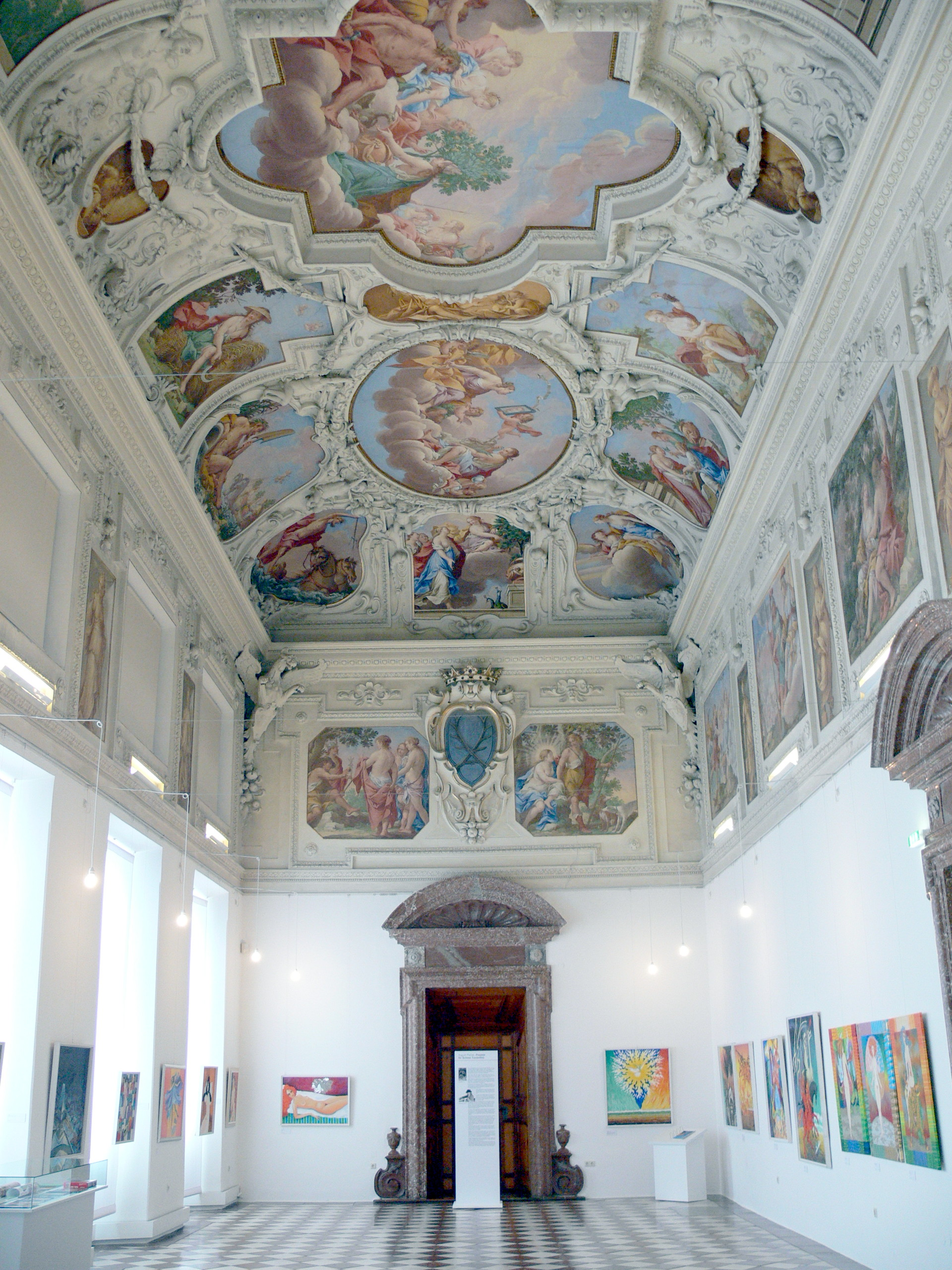
Marble Hall with frescoes by Carpoforo Tencalla

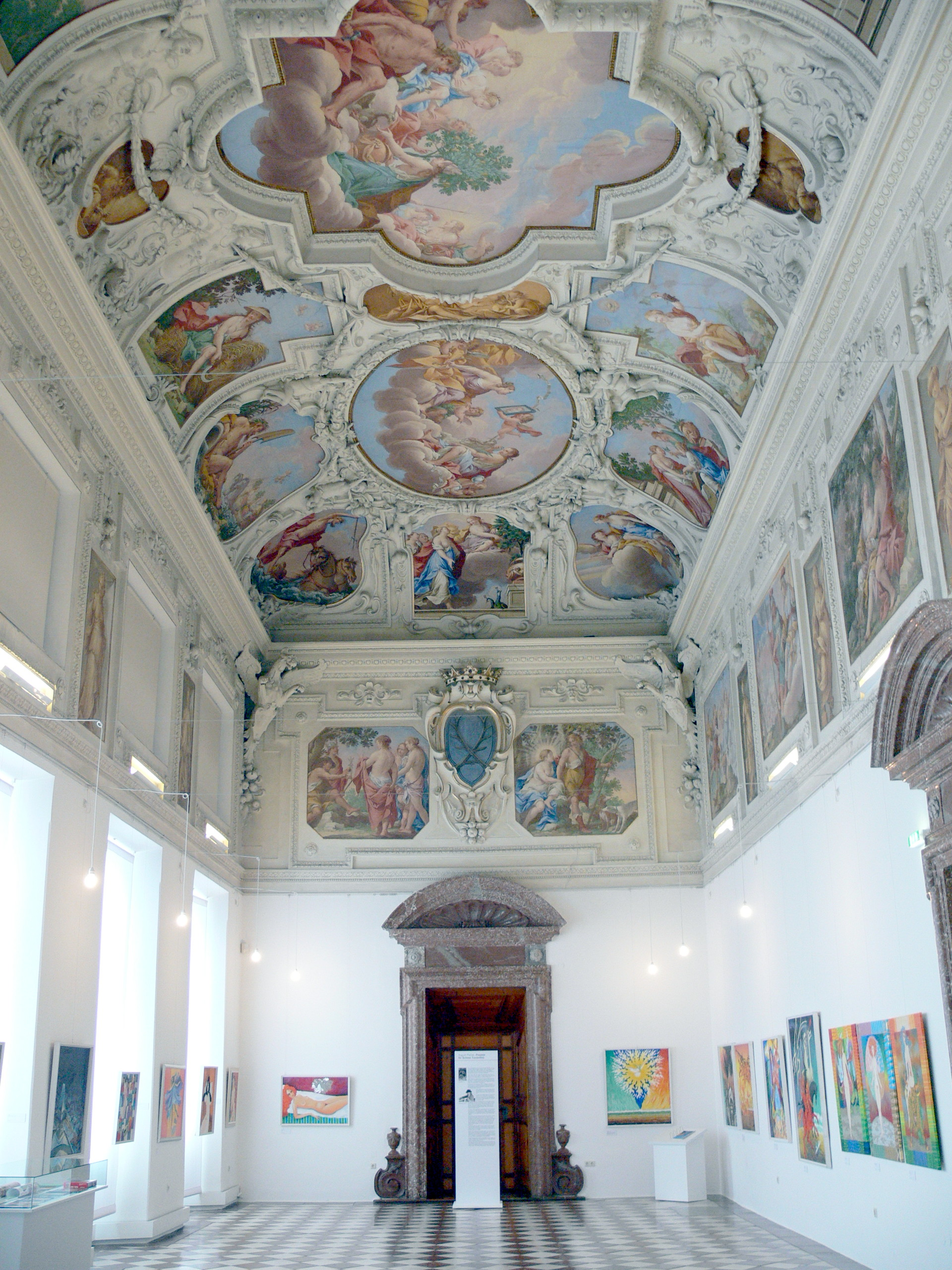
Trautenfels castle marble hall with frescos, 1670–73

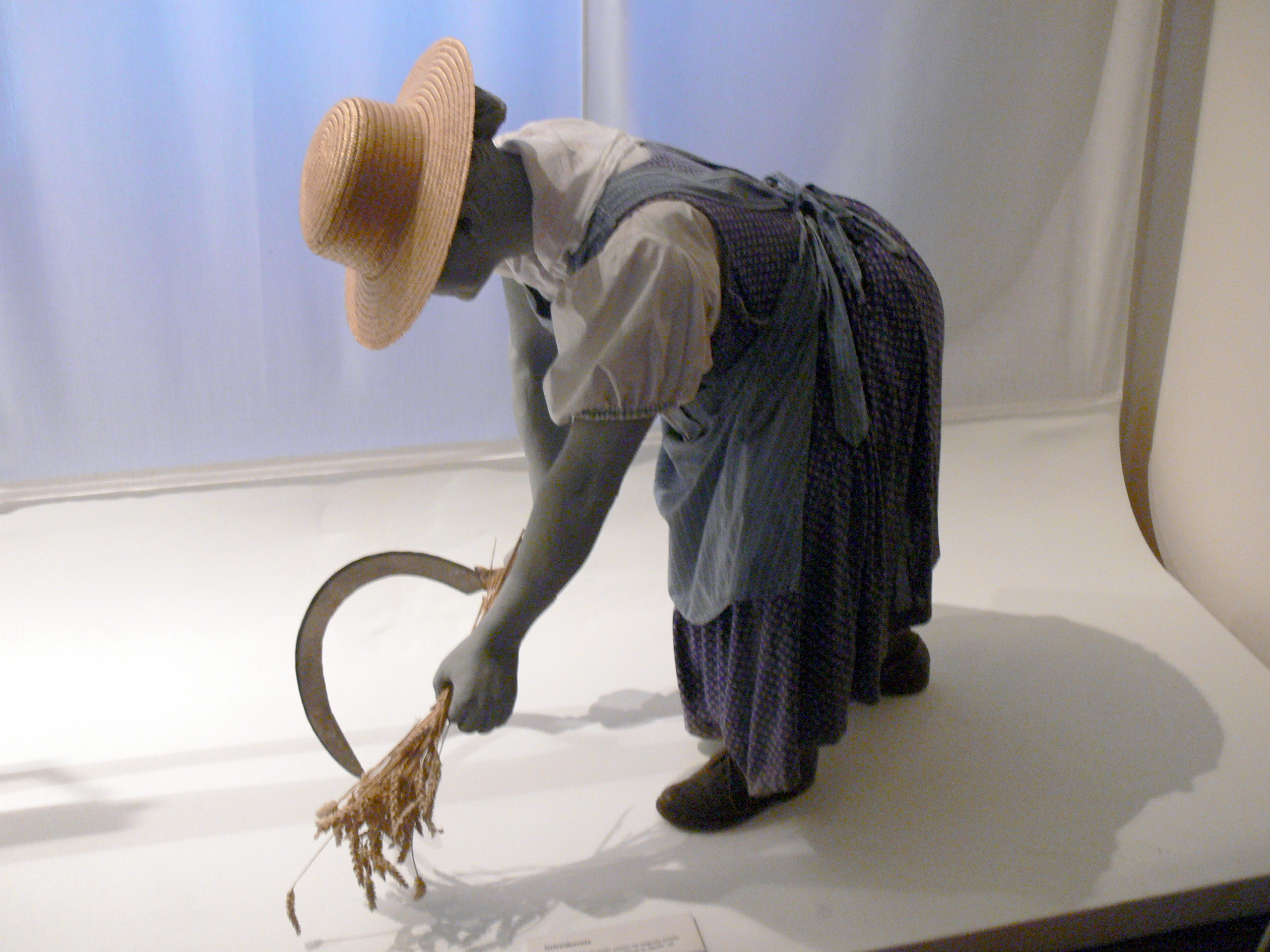
Harvesting exhibit from Landscape Museum

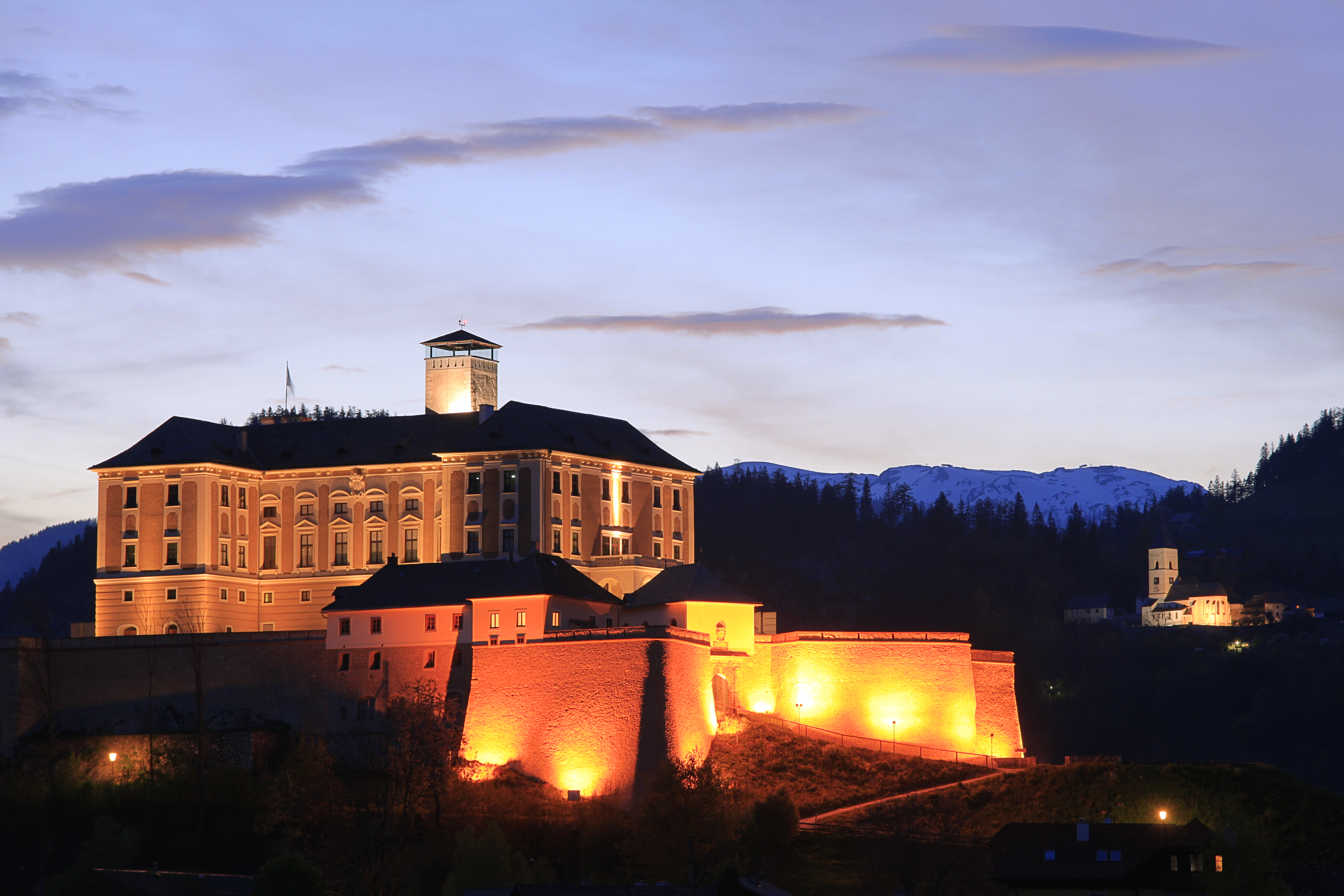
Trautenfels Castle at night

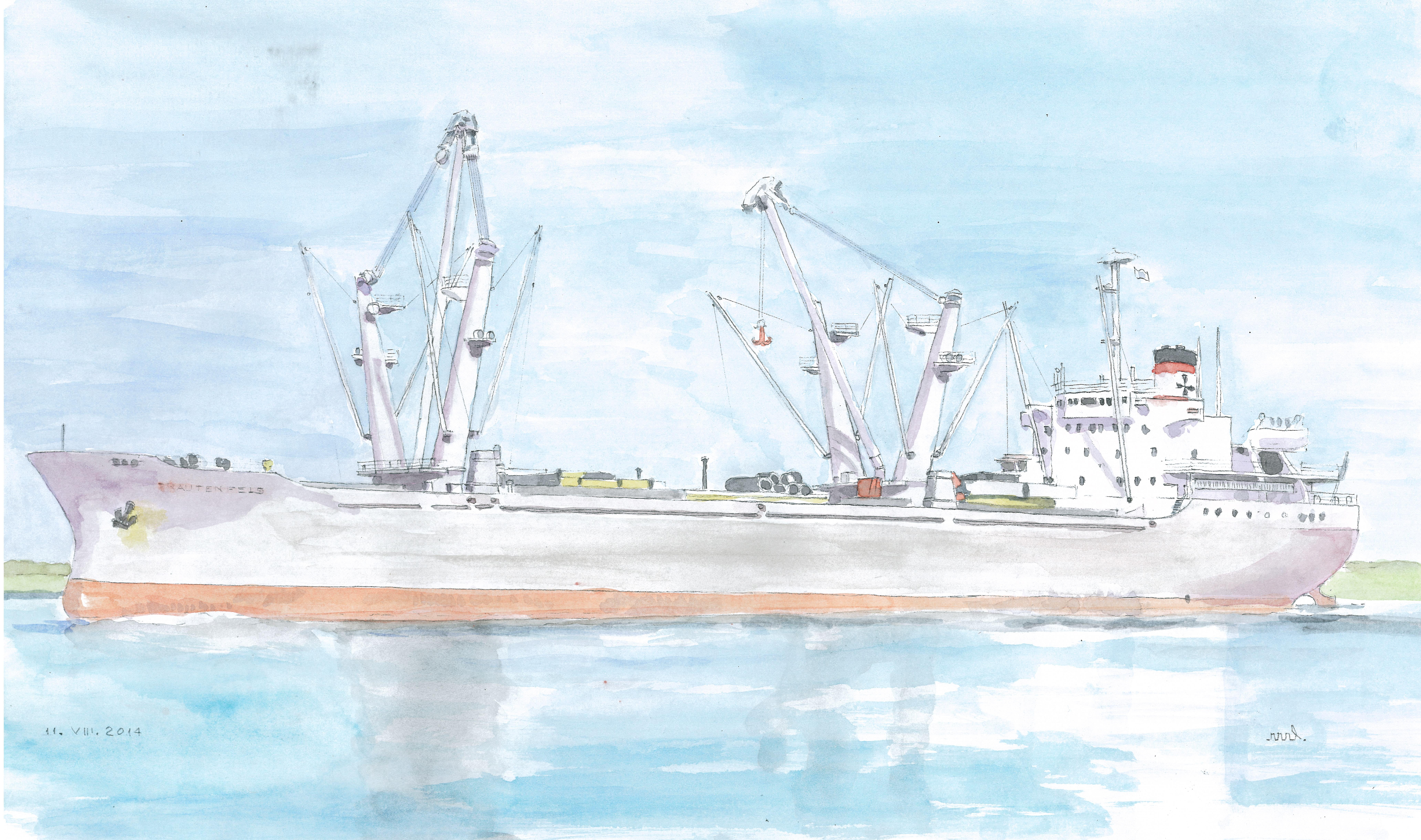
The German heavy-lift ship Trautenfels in 1977

== See also ==
- List of Baroque residences

== Literature ==
- Karin Leitner-Ruhe, "Aber zugreifen soll man, wo man nur kann." Zum Verkauf von Schloss Trautenfels 1941 durch die Familie Lamberg an die Deutsche Reichspost, in: Österreichische Zeitschrift für Volkskunde 113 (2010), pp. 157–178.
- Katharina Krenn, Schloss Trautenfels - ein dynamischer Platz für ein Museum?, in: Österreichische Zeitschrift für Volkskunde 113 (2010), pp. 250–270.
