= Steyr (river) =

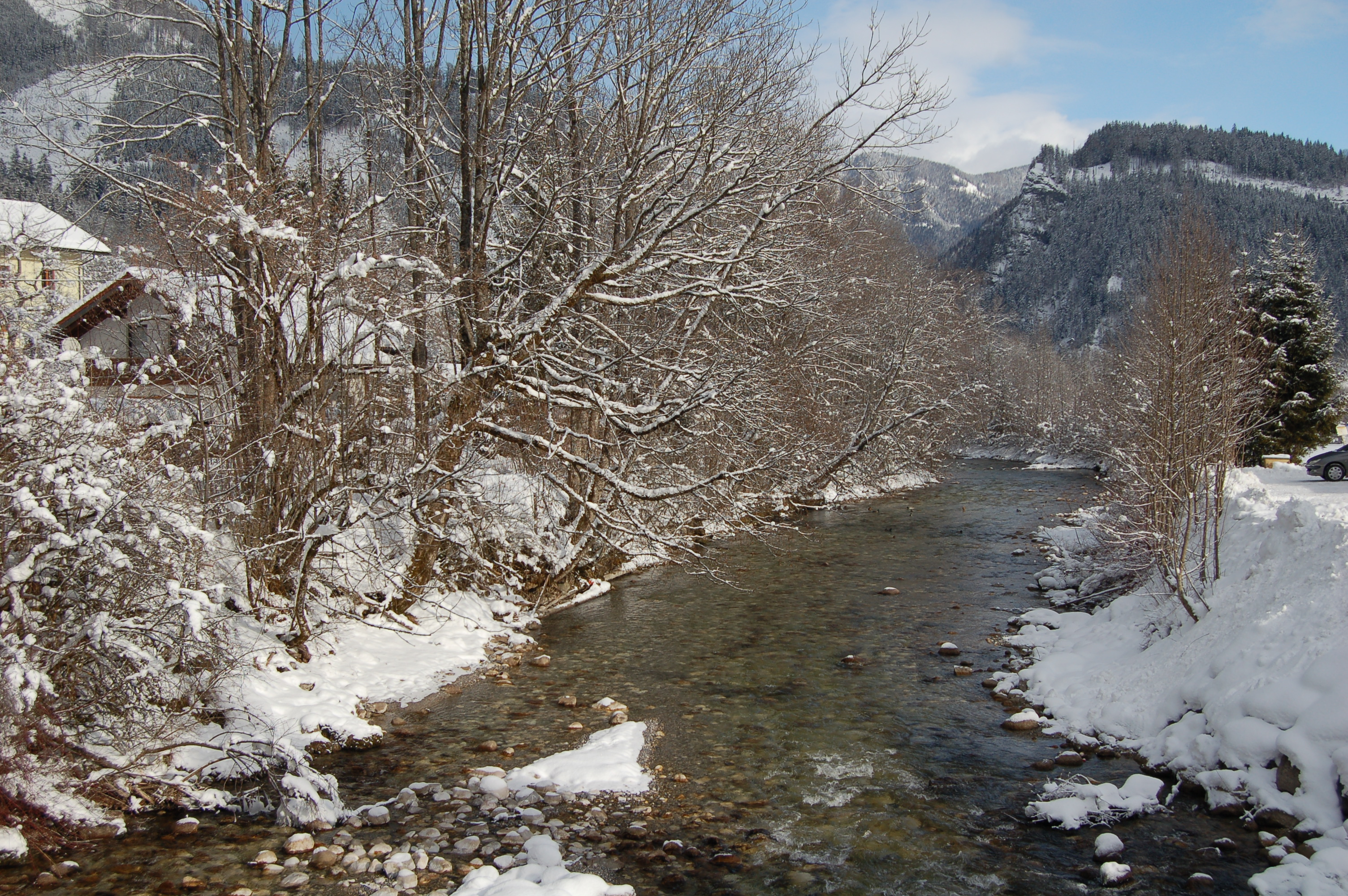

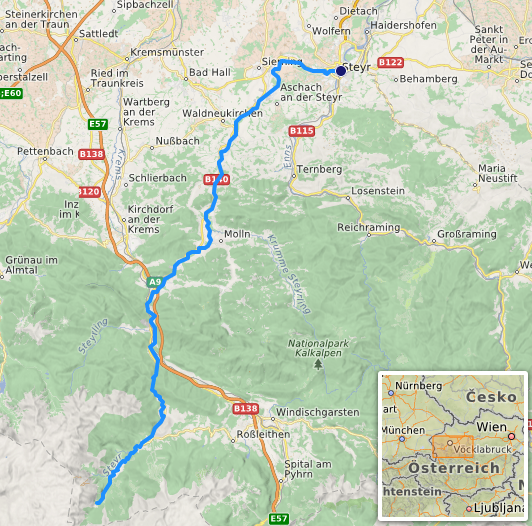

Location
- Country: Austria
- State: Upper Austria

Physical characteristics
- Source
  - location: at Hinterstoder
  - coordinates: 47.6422°N 14.0846°E
- Mouth
  - location: in Steyr into the Enns
  - coordinates: 48.0424°N 14.4220°E
- Length: 68.3 km (42.4 mi)
- Basin size: 917 km^{2} (354 sq mi)

Basin features
- Progression: Enns→ Danube→ Black Sea

The Steyr (German: [ˈʃtaɪɐ]) is a river in Upper Austria. Its length is approx. 68 km (42 mi). Its drainage basin is 917 km^{2} (354 sq mi).

Rising in the Totes Gebirge at Hinterstoder, it flows into the Enns in the town Steyr. There both rivers form a "Y". The city of Steyr uses this "Y" for marketing purposes.

== Tributaries ==
- Krumme Steyr
- Teichl
- Krumme Steyrling
