= List of Alpine peaks by prominence =

This is a list of the mountains of the Alps, ordered by their topographic prominence. For a list by height, see the list of mountains of the Alps. By descending to 1,500 m of prominence, this list includes all the Ultras of the Alps. Some famous peaks, such as the Matterhorn and Eiger, are not Ultras because they are connected to higher mountains by high cols and therefore do not achieve enough topographic prominence.

Where the prominence parent and the island parent differ, the prominence parent is marked with "^{1}" and the island parent with "^{2}" (with Mont Blanc abbreviated to MB). The column "Col height" denotes the lowest elevation to which one must descend from a peak in order to reach peaks with higher elevations; note that the elevation of any peak is the sum of its prominence and col. The column "Col location" denotes the pass where the col height is located.

| No | Peak | Country | Elevation (m) | Prominence (m) | Col height (m) | Col location | Parent |
|---|---|---|---|---|---|---|---|
| 1 | Mont Blanc | France/Italy | 4,810 | 4,697 | 113 | somewhere along the Volga–Baltic Waterway | Mount Everest |
| 2 | Großglockner | Austria | 3,798 | 2,423 | 1,375 | Brenner Pass | Mont Blanc |
| 3 | Finsteraarhorn | Switzerland | 4,274 | 2,279 | 1,995 | near Simplon Pass | Mont Blanc |
| 4 | Wildspitze | Austria | 3,768 | 2,261 | 1,507 | Reschen Pass | Finsteraarhorn^{1} / MB^{2} |
| 5 | Piz Bernina | Switzerland | 4,048 | 2,236 | 1,812 | Maloja Pass | Finsteraarhorn^{1} / MB^{2} |
| 6 | Hochkönig | Austria | 2,941 | 2,181 | 760 | near Maishofen | Großglockner^{1} / MB^{2} |
| 7 | Dufourspitze (Monte Rosa) | Switzerland/Italy | 4,634 | 2,165 | 2,469 | Great St Bernard Pass | Mont Blanc |
| 8 | Hoher Dachstein | Austria | 2,995 | 2,136 | 859 | near Eben im Pongau | Großglockner^{1} / MB^{2} |
| 9 | Marmolada | Italy | 3,343 | 2,131 | 1,212 | near Toblach | Großglockner^{1} / MB^{2} |
| 10 | Monte Viso | Italy | 3,841 | 2,062 | 1,779 | Col de l'Échelle | Mont Blanc |
| 11 | Triglav | Slovenia | 2,864 | 2,052 | 812 | Camporosso Pass | Marmolada^{1} / MB^{2} |
| 12 | Barre des Écrins | France | 4,102 | 2,045 | 2,057 | Col du Lautaret | Mont Blanc |
| 13 | Säntis | Switzerland | 2,503 | 2,021 | 482 | near Heiligkreuz bei Mels | Finsteraarhorn^{1} / MB^{2} |
| 14 | Ortler | Italy | 3,905 | 1,953 | 1,952 | Fraele Pass | Piz Bernina |
| 15 | Monte Baldo/Cima Valdritta | Italy | 2,218 | 1,950 | 268 | near San Giovanni Pass in Nago–Torbole | Ortler^{1} / MB^{2} |
| 16 | Gran Paradiso | Italy | 4,061 | 1,891 | 2,170 | near Little St Bernard Pass | Mont Blanc |
| 17 | Pizzo di Coca | Italy | 3,050 | 1,878 | 1,172 | near Aprica | Ortler^{1} / MB^{2} |
| 18 | Cima Dodici | Italy | 2,336 | 1,874 | 462 | near Pergine Valsugana | Marmolada^{1} / MB^{2} |
| 19 | Dents du Midi | Switzerland | 3,257 | 1,796 | 1,461 | Col des Montets | Mont Blanc |
| 20 | Chamechaude | France | 2,082 | 1,771 | 311 | near Chambéry | Mont Blanc |
| 21 | Zugspitze | Germany/Austria | 2,962 | 1,746 | 1,216 | near Fern Pass | Finsteraarhorn^{1} / MB^{2} |
| 22 | Monte Antelao | Italy | 3,264 | 1,735 | 1,529 | Passo Cimabanche | Marmolada |
| 23 | Arcalod | France | 2,217 | 1,713 | 504 | near Viuz in Faverges | Mont Blanc |
| 24 | Grintovec | Slovenia | 2,558 | 1,706 | 852 | near Rateče | Triglav |
| 25 | Großer Priel | Austria | 2,515 | 1,700 | 810 | near Pichl-Kainisch | Hoher Dachstein^{1} / MB^{2} |
| 26 | Grigna Settentrionale | Italy | 2,409 | 1,686 | 723 | near Balisio in Ballabio | Pizzo di Coca^{1} / MB^{2} |
| 27 | Monte Bondone | Italy | 2,180 | 1,679 | 501 | near Cadine in Trento | Ortler^{1} / MB^{2} |
| 28 | Presanella | Italy | 3,558 | 1,676 | 1,882 | Tonale Pass | Ortler |
| 29 | Birnhorn | Austria | 2,634 | 1,665 | 969 | near Hochfilzen | Großglockner^{1} / MB^{2} |
| 30 | Col Nudo | Italy | 2,471 | 1,644 | 827 | Passo di Sant'Osvaldo | Antelao^{1} / MB^{2} |
| 31 | Pointe Percée | France | 2,750 | 1,643 | 1,107 | near Pont d'Arbon near Megève | Mont Blanc |
| 32 | Jôf di Montasio | Italy | 2,753 | 1,597 | 1,156 | Predil Pass | Triglav |
| 33 | Mölltaler Polinik | Austria | 2,784 | 1,579 | 1,205 | Iselsberg Pass | Großglockner^{1} / MB^{2} |
| 34 | Tödi | Switzerland | 3,614 | 1,570 | 2,044 | Oberalp Pass | Finsteraarhorn |
| 35 | Birkkarspitze | Austria | 2,749 | 1,564 | 1,185 | Seefelder Sattel | Zugspitze^{1} / MB^{2} |
| 36 | Ellmauer Halt | Austria | 2,344 | 1,551 | 793 | near Ellmau | Großglockner^{1} / MB^{2} |
| 37 | Grande Tête de l'Obiou | France | 2,790 | 1,542 | 1,248 | Col Bayard | Barre des Écrins^{1} / MB^{2} |
| 38 | Hochtor | Austria | 2,369 | 1,520 | 849 | Schober Pass | Großglockner^{1} / MB^{2} |
| 39 | Grimming | Austria | 2,351 | 1,518 | 833 | near Schrödis and Tauplitz | Großer Priel |
| 40 | Grand Combin | Switzerland | 4,309 | 1,512 | 2,797 | Fenêtre de Durand | Monte Rosa |
| 41 | La Tournette | France | 2,351 | 1,514 | 837 | Col du Marais | Pointe Percée^{1} / MB^{2} |
| 42 | Zirbitzkogel | Austria | 2,396 | 1,502 | 894 | Neumarkter Sattel | Großglockner^{1} / MB^{2} |
| 43 | Piz Kesch | Switzerland | 3,418 | 1,502 | 1,916 | Lukmanier Pass | Finsteraarhorn^{1} / MB^{2} |
| 44 | Cima Brenta | Italy | 3,151 | 1,501 | 1,650 | near Campo Carlo Magno | Presanella^{1} / MB^{2} |

== See also ==
- Worldwide list of peaks ranked by prominence
- List of mountains of Switzerland (with height and prominence ranking)
- List of peaks in the British Isles ranked by prominence
- List of European ultra-prominent peaks
- List of the highest European ultra-prominent peaks
