= Warscheneck =

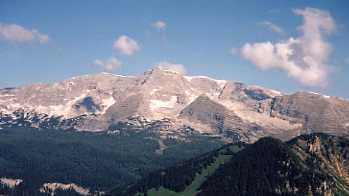
- Warscheneck

Highest point
- Elevation: 2,388 m (7,835 ft)
- Prominence: 655 m (2,149 ft)
- Coordinates: 47°39′N 14°14′E

Geography
- Location within Alps
- Location: Styria, Austria
- Parent range: Totes Gebirge

Warscheneck (2,388 m) is a mountain of the Totes Gebirge in the Eastern Alps, in Upper Austria. It is located near the town of Liezen, and is a popular mountain for hiking in the summer and ski touring in the winter.
