= Stainach =

- Former municipality
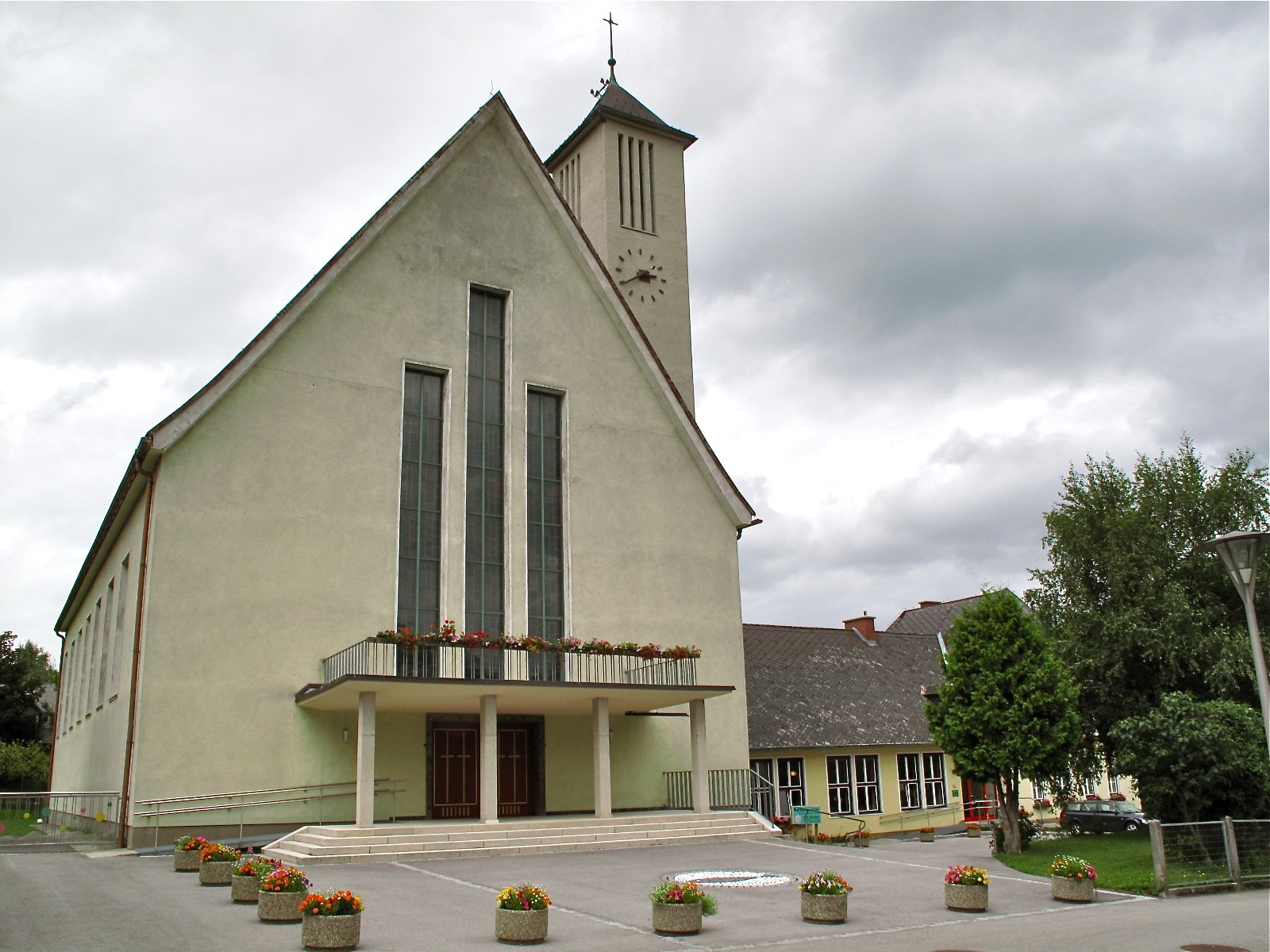
- Stainach parish church

- Coat of arms

- Location within Austria
- Coordinates: 47°32′00″N 14°6′00″E
- Country: Austria
- State: Styria
- District: Liezen

Area
  - Total: 10.26 km^{2} (3.96 sq mi)
- Elevation: 655 m (2,149 ft)

Population (1 January 2016)
  - Total: 1,957
  - Density: 190.7/km^{2} (494.0/sq mi)
- Time zone: UTC+1 (CET)
  - Summer (DST): UTC+2 (CEST)
- Postal code: 8950
- Area code: 03682
- Vehicle registration: LI
- Website: https://www.stainach-puergg.gv.at/

Stainach (German: [ˈʃtaɪnax]) is a former municipality in the district of Liezen in the Austrian state of Styria. Since the 2015 Styria municipal structural reform, it is part of the municipality Stainach-Pürgg.

== Geography ==
Stainach lies in the Enns valley.
