= Großer Priel =

Mountain in Austria

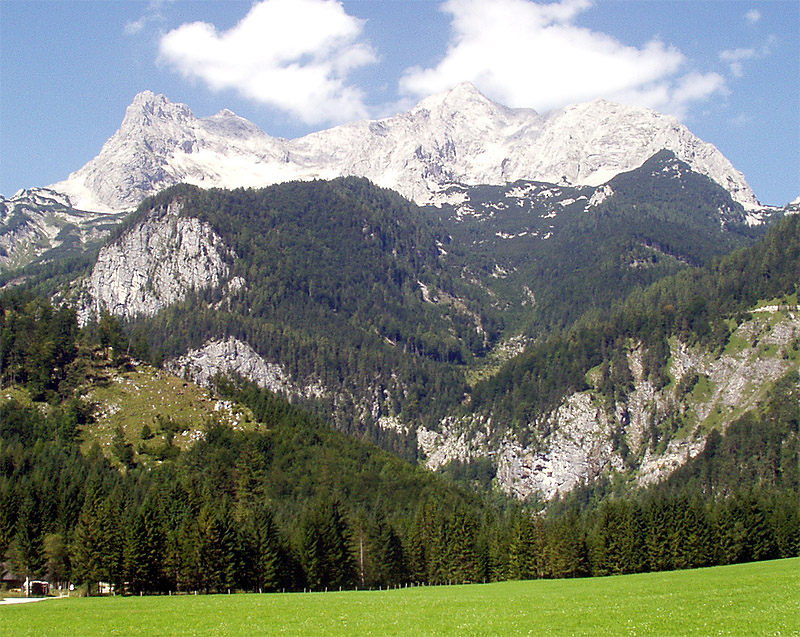
- Großer Priel face, view from Hinterstoder

Highest point
- Elevation: 2,515 m (8,251 ft)
- Prominence: 1,703 m (5,587 ft); Ranked 25th in the Alps
- Listing: Ultra
- Coordinates: 47°43′01″N 14°03′48″E

Geography
- Location within Alps
- Location: Gmunden District, Upper Austria; Austria
- Parent range: Totes Gebirge; Northern Limestone Alps

The Großer Priel (German pronunciation: [ˈɡʁoːsɐ ˈpʁiːl]) is, at 2,515 metres above the Adriatic (8,251 ft), the highest mountain of the Totes Gebirge range, located in the Traunviertel region of Upper Austria. It ranks among the ultra prominent peaks of the Alps. Part of the Northern Limestone Alps, its steep Dachstein cliffs form the northeastern rim of a large karst plateau and are visible from afar across the Alpine Foreland.

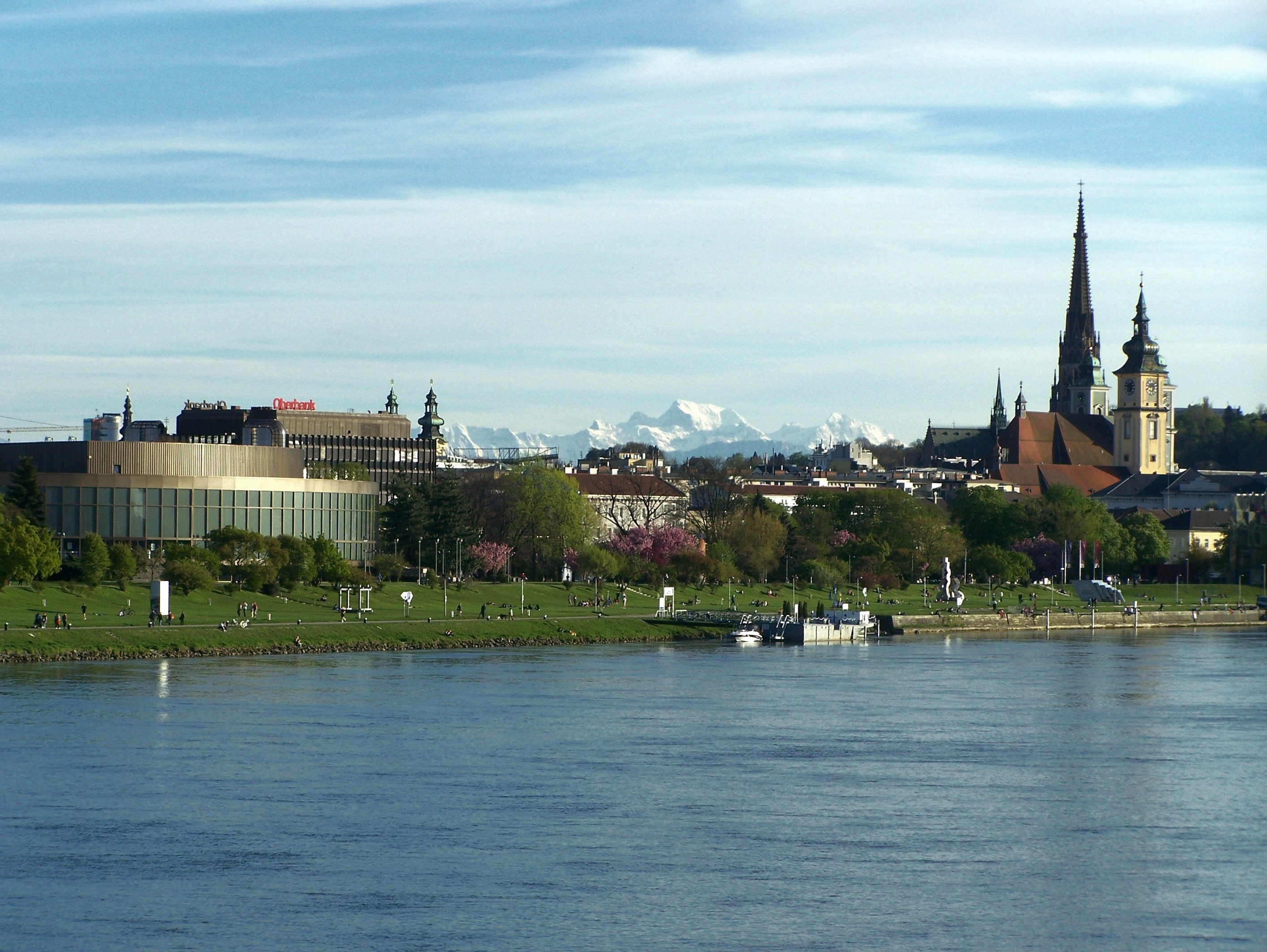
Großer Priel massif, seen from Linz

First mentioned as Pruell in a 1584 deed, it was denoted as mons altissimus totius provintzia in the 1667 map of Upper Austria by geographer Georg Matthäus Vischer. The prominent peak was also mentioned in the travelogues of Archduke John of Austria in 1810; a first touristic ascent is documented in 1817, followed by the climb of Archduke Louis of Austria in 1819. A summit cross was erected in 1870, at the time when the Totes Gebirge range was gradually opened to mountaineers by the Austrian Tourist Club.

Today, the most common routes of ascent are from Hinterstoder via the Prielschutzhaus, an alpine hut managed by the Austrian Alpine Club, on the south side of the mountain, and from the Alm valley via Welser Hütte on the north side. There are also a number of paths leading from the Großer Priel summit to the rest of the Totes Gebirge plateau.

== See also ==
- List of Alpine peaks by prominence
