= Grimming =

Mountain in Styria, Austria

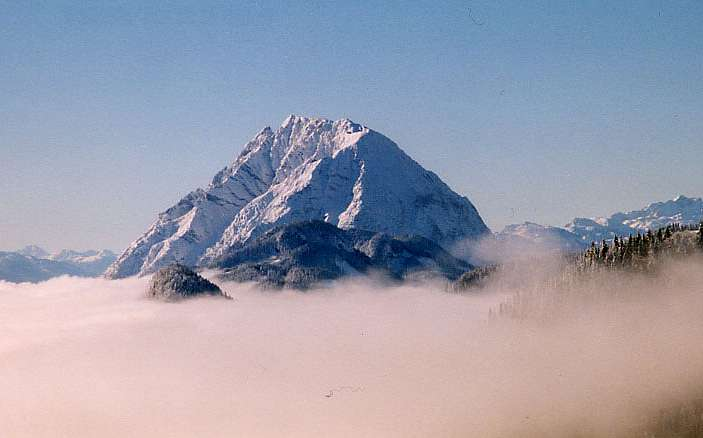

Highest point
- Elevation: 2,351 m (7,713 ft)
- Prominence: 1,518 m (4,980 ft)
- Listing: Ultra
- Coordinates: 47°31′14″N 14°1′1″E

Geography
- Location within Alps
- Location: Styria, Austria
- Parent range: Dachstein Mountains

The Grimming (2,351 m, German: [ˈɡʁɪmiŋ]) is an isolated peak in the Dachstein Mountains of Austria and one of the few ultra-prominent mountains of the Alps.

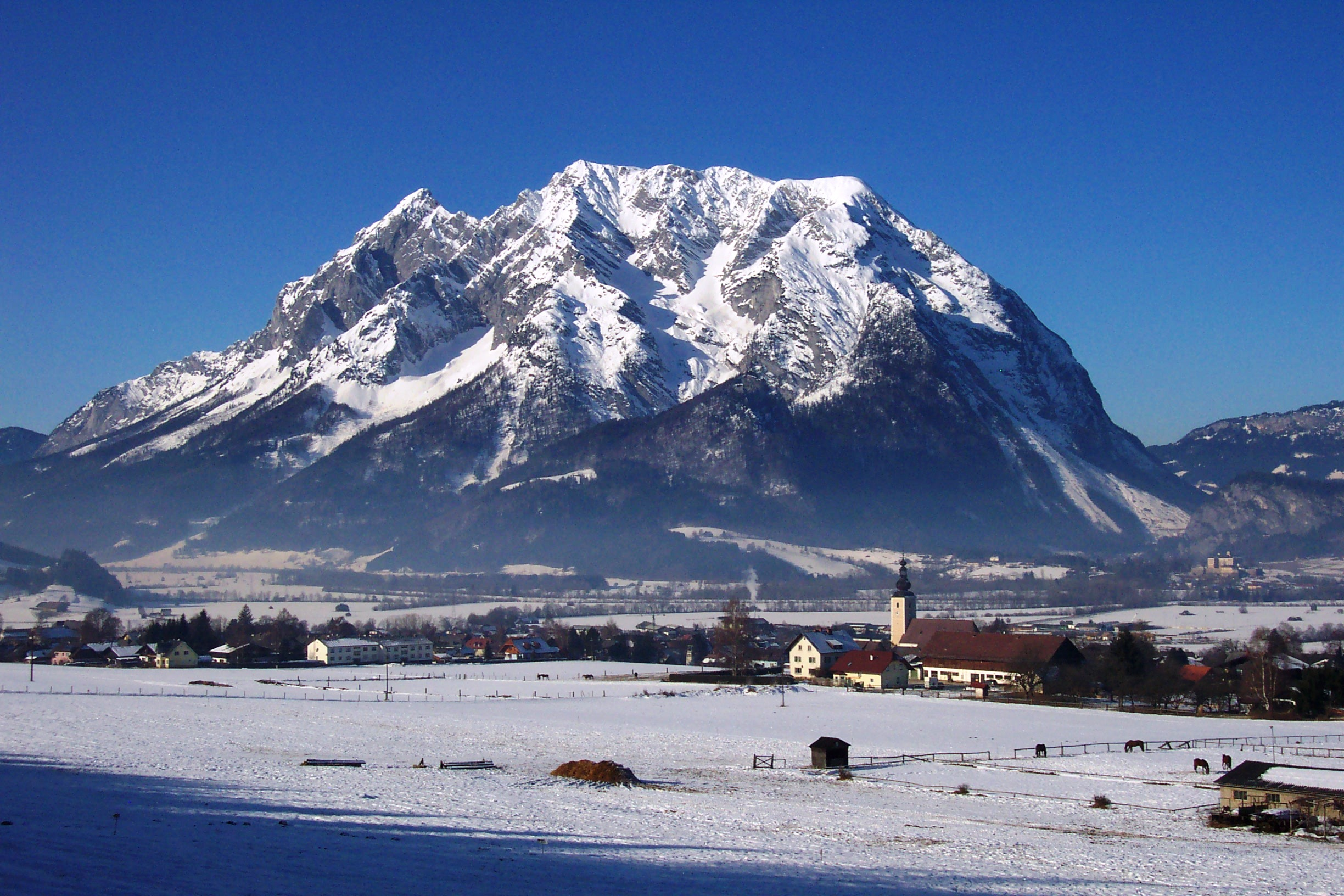
The Grimming seen from Irdning

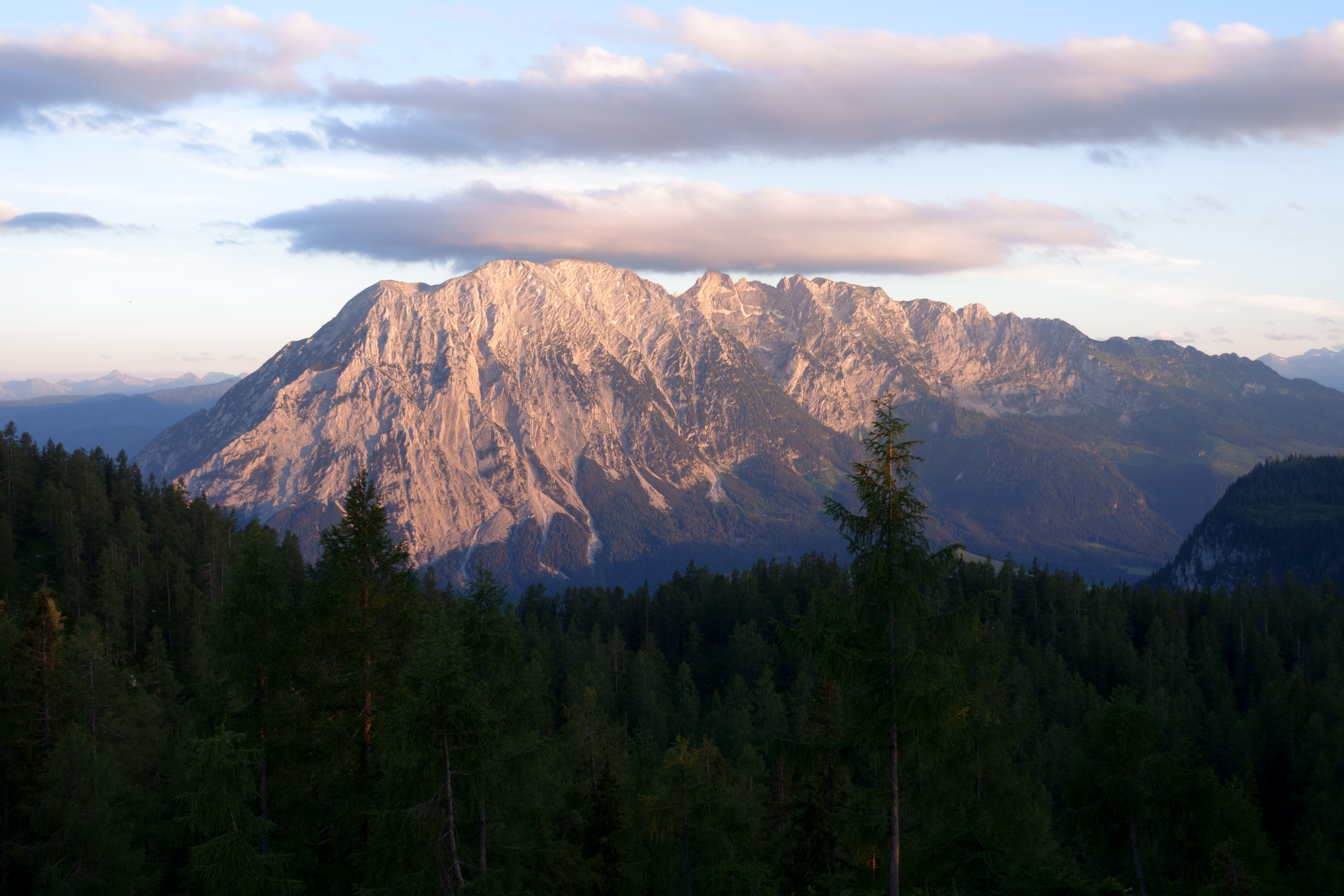
The Grimming seen from the Tauplitzalm

== Geography ==
=== Location ===
The Grimming rises between the Enns valley and Salzkammergut, east of the Dachstein massif, being separated from its eastern rim by the Salza Gorge.

=== Geology ===
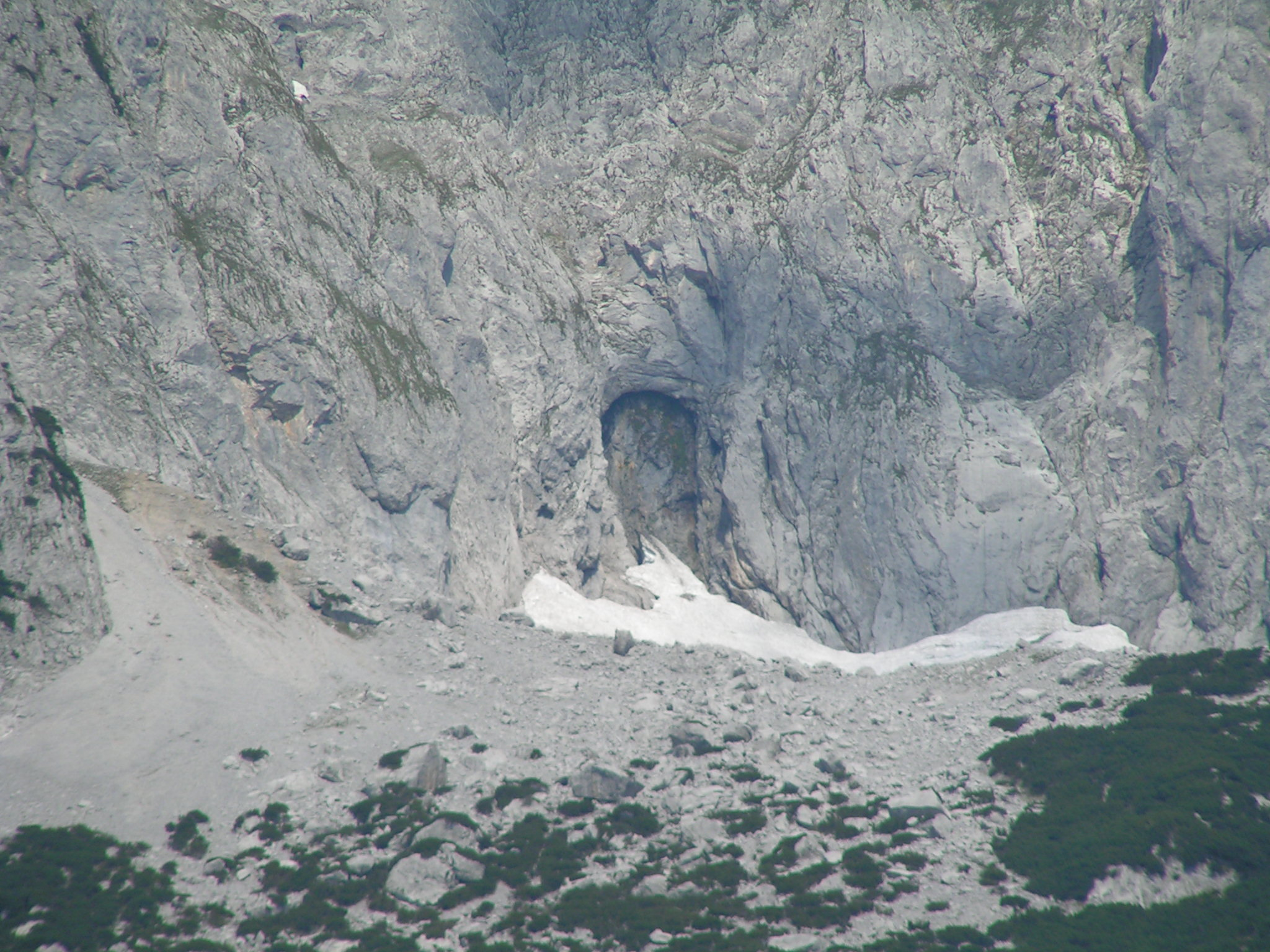
The Grimmingtor

Although it is topographically separate from the Dachstein, the Grimming is mainly made of Dachstein limestone.

Southwest of the main summit is the Grimmingtor (Grimming Gate), a roughly 50-metre-high and 15-metre-wide recess in the rock face, capped by a 10-metre-thick rock overhang. To the east it is bounded by a large rib of rock, which is why, in certain light conditions, it has the appearance of a gate. According to legend, rich treasures have been hidden behind this "gate".

== History ==
Thanks to its imposing appearance, the mountain was long described as mons Styriae altissimus, the highest mountain in the Austrian state of Styria. It was used as a survey mark for early land surveys; in 1822 Lieutenant Carl Baron Simbschen erected a wooden survey mark at the summit and a stone hut just below it as a shelter.

== Access ==
The mountain is a popular destination for mountaineers and climbers. The Grimming Hut (966 m) is the only hut in this massif and is not far above the valley. North of the Grimming summit there is a bothy that was built in 1949 and may be used as emergency shelter in bad weather.

== See also ==
- List of Alpine peaks by prominence

== Literature ==
- Paula Grogger: Das Grimmingtor. Literarische Aufarbeitung der Sagen rund um den Grimming. ISBN 3-222-11575-3.
- Josef Hasitschka; Ernst Kren; Adolf Mokrejs (2011), Universalmuseum Joanneum Schloss Trautenfels (ed.), Der Grimming. Monolith im Ennstal (in German) (1 ed.), Alland: Schall Verlag, ISBN 978-3-900533-69-4
