= Totes Gebirge =

Mountain range in Austria

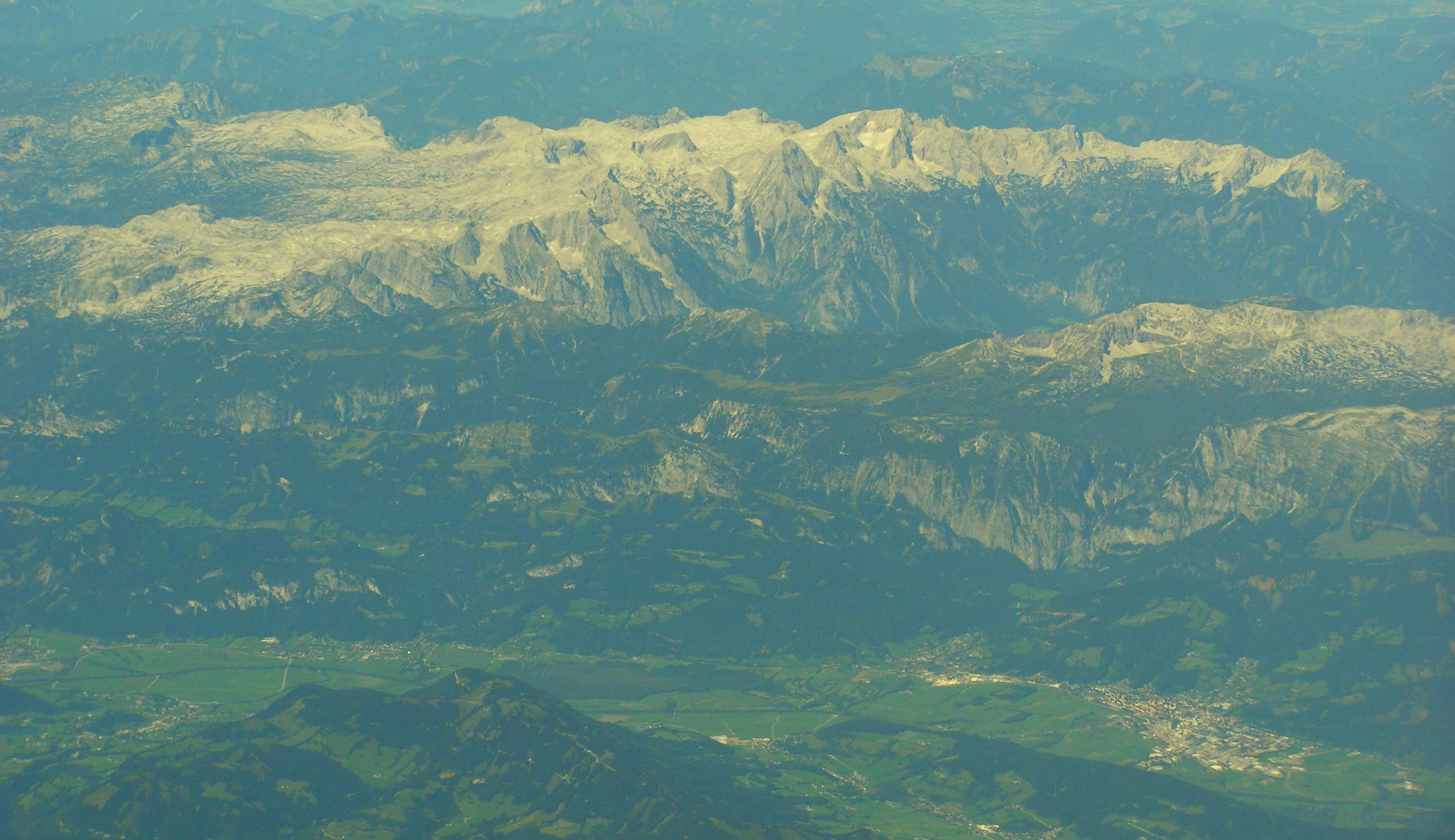
- Aerial photo of Totes Gebirge

Highest point
- Peak: Großer Priel
- Elevation: 2,515 m (8,251 ft)
- Coordinates: 47°43′1″N 14°3′48″E

Geography
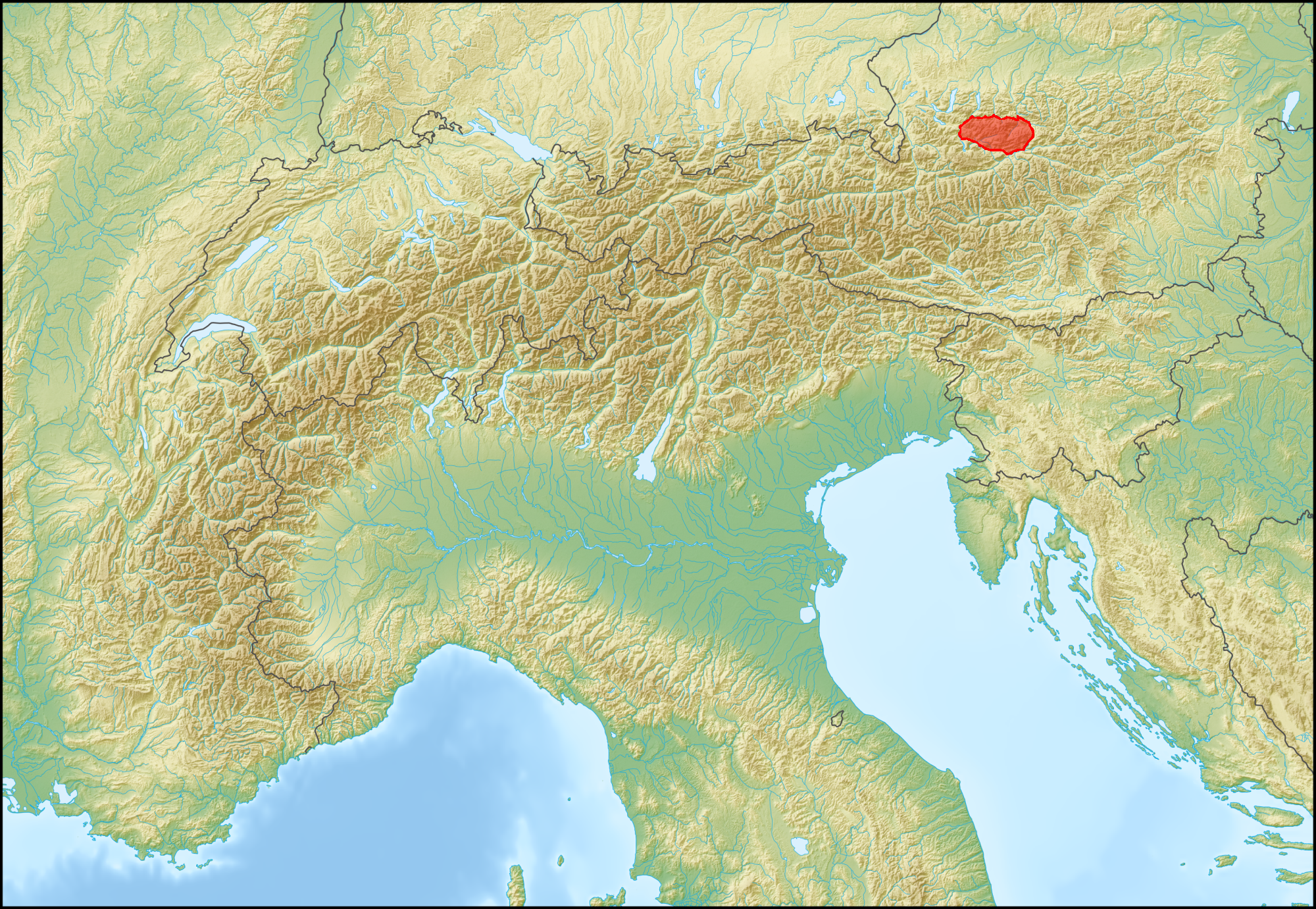
- Totes Gebirge (in red) within the Alps. The borders of the range according to Alpine Club classification of the Eastern Alps
- Country: Austria
- States: Styria; Upper Austria
- Parent range: Northern Limestone Alps

The Totes Gebirge, also known in English as the Dead Mountains, is a mountain range in Austria that forms part of the Northern Limestone Alps, lying between the Salzkammergut and the Ennstaler Alpen. The name Totes Gebirge is supposedly derived from the German words tot meaning "dead", referring to the apparent lack of vegetation, and Gebirge meaning "mountain range". The area is a large karst plateau with steep sides, and several mountain peaks above 2000 m. The highest point is the summit of Großer Priel, at 2,515 metres (8,251 ft).

There are some disputes concerning the name origin for "Dead Mountains." One position claims this comes from the range being the largest karst plateau of the Limestone Alps, featuring many lakes, caves, and sinkholes. Another argument for the naming of this range centers on how there are no salt deposits in the rock formations of this region which contributes to the lack of flora.

There are 612 mountains in the Totes Gebirge. The mountain range features multiple managed huts on the accessible outskirts with 3 huts positioned on the interior inside the high plateau. People can use these huts to traverse the mountain range along various trails and routes.

== Geography ==
The range contains an arid plateau, steep cliffs on the Styria-facing side, and extensive karst formations, including hundreds of caves, gorges, crevices, and shafts. The region is part of the Austrian Northern Limestone Alps; soluble rocks such as limestone are conducive to the formation of karst features. The Schönberg Cave in the western part of the range is the longest in the Eastern Alps, extending an impressive 135 km (84 mi) long and reaching a depth of 1,061 m (3,481 ft).

Although the area receives relatively high precipitation, the upper slopes and plateau are dry, with little or no vegetation. Widespread limestone creates geographic conditions where the ground is highly soluble. This means water quickly drains into the karst waterways and emerges as springs in the valleys far below.

A few large lakes, such as the Grundlsee and the Altausseer See, sit in the mountain’s southwest basin, where the Traun Glacier once existed during previous Ice Ages. Altausseer See has been less disturbed by humans and maintains a relatively pristine state. The mountains are divided into three sections – the Priel Group, the Warscheneckstock Group, and the Schönberg Group – and are neighbored by the Salzkammergut Mountains and Ennstaler Alps.

== Geology ==
The Totes Gebirge's most noted features are its karst formations. The range primarily comprises carbonate rocks such as Dachstein limestone, Wetterstein limestone, sandstone, and siltstone. Totes Gebirge contains over 600 caves, enormous gorges, and crevices that move water from higher elevations to the valleys and lowlands below.

The geologic history of the Alps dates back over 200 million years. Around this time, Pangea began to split along the Eurasian and African plates, creating a shallow seaway known as the Tethys Sea, where sediment and shells collected on the ocean floor. During the early Cretaceous era, around 140 million years ago, the African plate drifted north, pushing sediment and folding deposits on the ocean floor over each other. This process formed Dachstein and Wetterstein limestone, two rock types found in the range.

The Alpine orogeny raised the Alps when the African and Eurasian plates collided. The collision has been ongoing since Cretaceous times. The majority of mountain building occurred between 65 and 2.5 million years ago. The uplift no longer outpaces the rate of erosion, so the Alps are not considered a growing range.

Several fossils have been discovered in the Dachstein limestone, including pachyrisma grande molluscs and megalodon fossils whose shape resembles a cloven cow track. Meanwhile, a Mystriosuchus fossil, an enormous marine reptile from the Triassic era, was discovered around 2,000 m (6,560 ft) above sea level.

== Ecology ==
Ranging from lower elevations around Lake Altaussee up along the slopes, the Totes Gebirge is home to a variety of wildlife. Avian species include goshawks, sparrowhawks, common sandpipers, Tengmaim’s owl, rock partridges, golden eagles, gray herons, tufted ducks, eagle owls, grouse, swans. For mammals, deer, rodents, and many bats, such as the lesser horseshoe bat and the greater mouse-eared bat, make their home here.

The Totes Gebirge is protected as a Natura 2000 area. The subalpine forest supports conifers like spruce, larch, and Swiss pine. There is no clear tree line, but rather, there is a gradual fade between plant communities. As elevation increases, spruce and larch decrease and Swiss pine dominates. Alpine meadows stretch along the slopes with wildflowers blooming in summer. The upper plateau has relatively little vegetation, featuring karst formations and fossilized snails, corals, and shells.

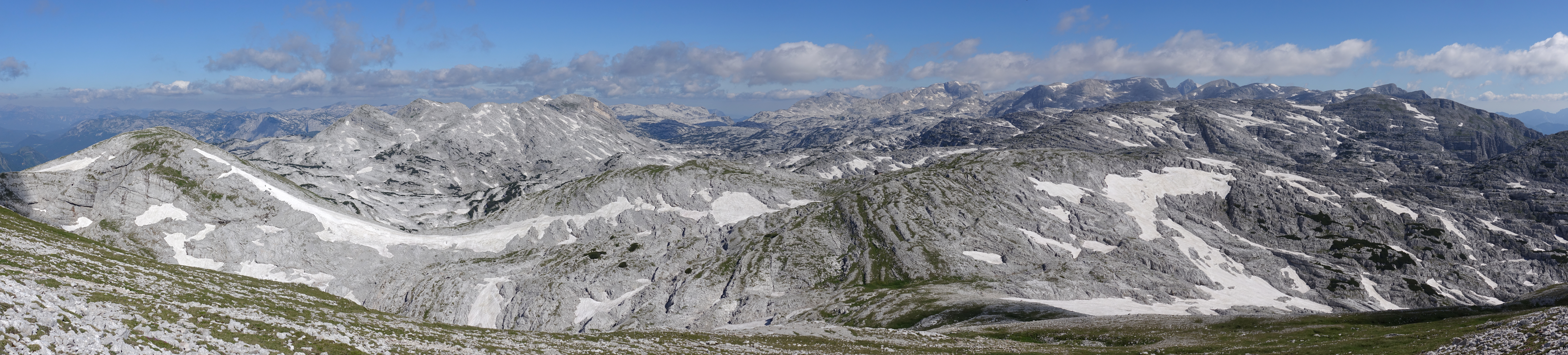
Panoramic view of Totes Gebirge

== See also ==
- Limestone Alps
