= Winzendorf-Muthmannsdorf =

- Municipality
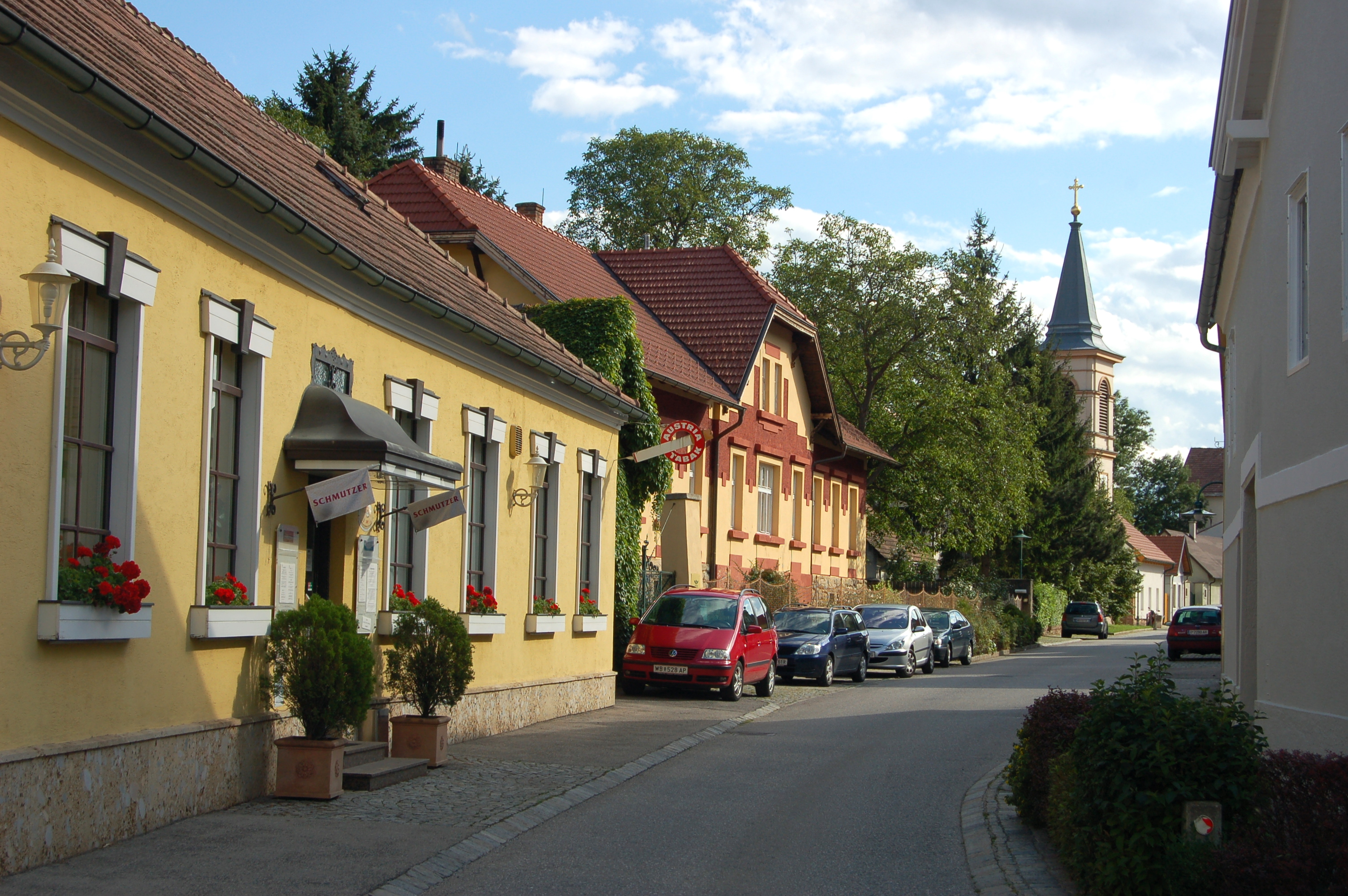

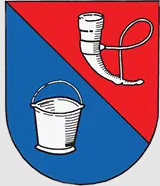
- Coat of arms

- Location within Austria
- Coordinates: 47°48′00″N 16°07′00″E
- Country: Austria
- State: Lower Austria
- District: Wiener Neustadt-Land

Government
  - Mayor: Peter Mayer (UBL)

Area
  - Total: 16.16 km^{2} (6.24 sq mi)
- Elevation: 327 m (1,073 ft)

Population (2021-01-01)
  - Total: 1,881
  - Density: 116.4/km^{2} (301.5/sq mi)
- Time zone: UTC+1 (CET)
  - Summer (DST): UTC+2 (CEST)
- Postal code: 2722
- Area code: 02638
- Vehicle registration: WB

The market town of Winzendorf-Muthmannsdorf is an Austrian municipality in the district of Wiener Neustadt-Land in Lower Austria. It is situated some 64 km south of Vienna at the edge of the Southern Viennese Basin.

== Geography ==
Winzendorf-Muthmannsdorf is situated in Lower Austria's industrial zone (Industrieviertel) on the edge of the Steinfeld, also called the Dry Plain, the southern region of the Vienna Basin. The area of the market town covers 16.16 square kilometres. 53.93 percent of the area is forested. The Fischauer Vorberge with an altitude of up to about 600 m run through the municipal area. Characteristic of these hills are the pine forests with black pine the typical Wienerwald-Schwarzföhren (the austriaca form of the European Black Pine, Pinus nigra). The southern part of the municipality, the cadastral municipality of Winzendorf is situated on the Steinfeld, the northern part, Muthmannsdorf, in a valley basin called "Neue Welt" (New World).

== Municipal structure ==
The municipal area comprises the following three localities (number of inhabitants in brackets as of 1 January 2021):

- Emmerberg (64)
- Muthmannsdorf (533)
- Winzendorf (1284)

The municipality consists of the cadastral communities Emmerberg, Muthmannsdorf and Winzendorf.

== History ==
The area around Winzendorf-Muthmannsdorf has been settled for at least 6000 years, as archaeological evidence shows. Finds in the western and northern parts of the New World date back to the Neolithic Age. The many caves in the limestone stock of the Hohe Wand as well as in the Fischau Foothills offered people a safe natural refuge. The Schwarzgraben cave near Maiersdorf is one of the best-known sites. In the Malleiten area (also Maleiten, Marleiten, Malleitenberg oder Mahleiten), about 7 km northeast in the Fischauer Vorberge near Dreistetten, the oldest finds date back to the 5th millennium BC. Later, in the Urnfield culture and Hallstatt culture (ca. 1300-450 BC), there was a hilltop settlement there. The best-known find is a fire goat (Mondidol) from around 800 BC. Before the birth of Christ, the area was part of the Celtic kingdom of Noricum and belonged to the surroundings of the Celtic hilltop settlement of Burg on the Schwarzenbach Burgberg (Bucklige Welt). Based on finds from the Roman period, it was possible to reconstruct a network of roads and local traffic routes in the Wiener Neustadt area, which also included the municipality of Winzendorf-Muthmannsdorf. Even today, the "Römerweg" (Roman path) leading from Bad Fischau-Brunn to Willendorf an der Schneebergbahn is a reminder of this. For Winzendorf, one can assume a settlement (vicus) on the basis of the many finds. In Muthmannsdorf there are fewer finds that point to a Roman settlement. However, it is likely that a Roman road went through the "New World" coming from Vösendorf / Sollenau via Dreistetten, Muthmansdorf, Würflach on to Neunkirchen.

A bull-killing relief from the middle of the 3rd century, which was found in Winzendorf around 1886, testifies to the Roman cult of Mithras in the area. With the establishment of Christianity in the Roman Empire, this religion, practised only by men in mostly remote places such as caves, disappeared within a few generations. In addition to the relief slabs, a limestone votivara dedicated to Mithras by a stable master of the 10th Legion was also found in a vineyard.

There are no written documents up to the 12th century. Place, water names and settlement names show that Slavs and pre-Bavarian-Germanic tribes had settled in the area of the municipality of Winzendorf-Muthmannsdorf.

The first documentary mention of Muthmannsdorf dates from between 1107 and 1122. In the foundation charter for the parish of Waldegg, about 9 km away, a man named "Hiltegrunn de Mutinesdorf" appears as a witness in 1136. His official residence may have been the so-called "Burgstall" to the east in the forest above Muthmannsdorf.

The first documentary mention of Winzendorf dates from 1157 to 1163. It is found in a document with which the Bishop Conrad of Babenberg had settled the ownership of the vineyards on the occasion of a legal dispute.

It is known that in the 13th century the inhabitants of Muthmannsdorf were subjects of the Starhemberg dominion.

== Population ==
Historical population
Year	Pop.	±%
1869	929	—
1880	958	+3.1%
1890	1,015	+5.9%
1900	1,129	+11.2%
1910	1,117	−1.1%
1923	1,349	+20.8%
1934	1,297	−3.9%
1939	1,320	+1.8%
1951	1,446	+9.5%
1961	1,496	+3.5%
1971	1,594	+6.6%
1981	1,561	−2.1%
1991	1,529	−2.0%
2001	1,711	+11.9%
2011	1,838	+7.4%
2021	1,881	+2.3%
