= Ebenfurth =

- Municipality
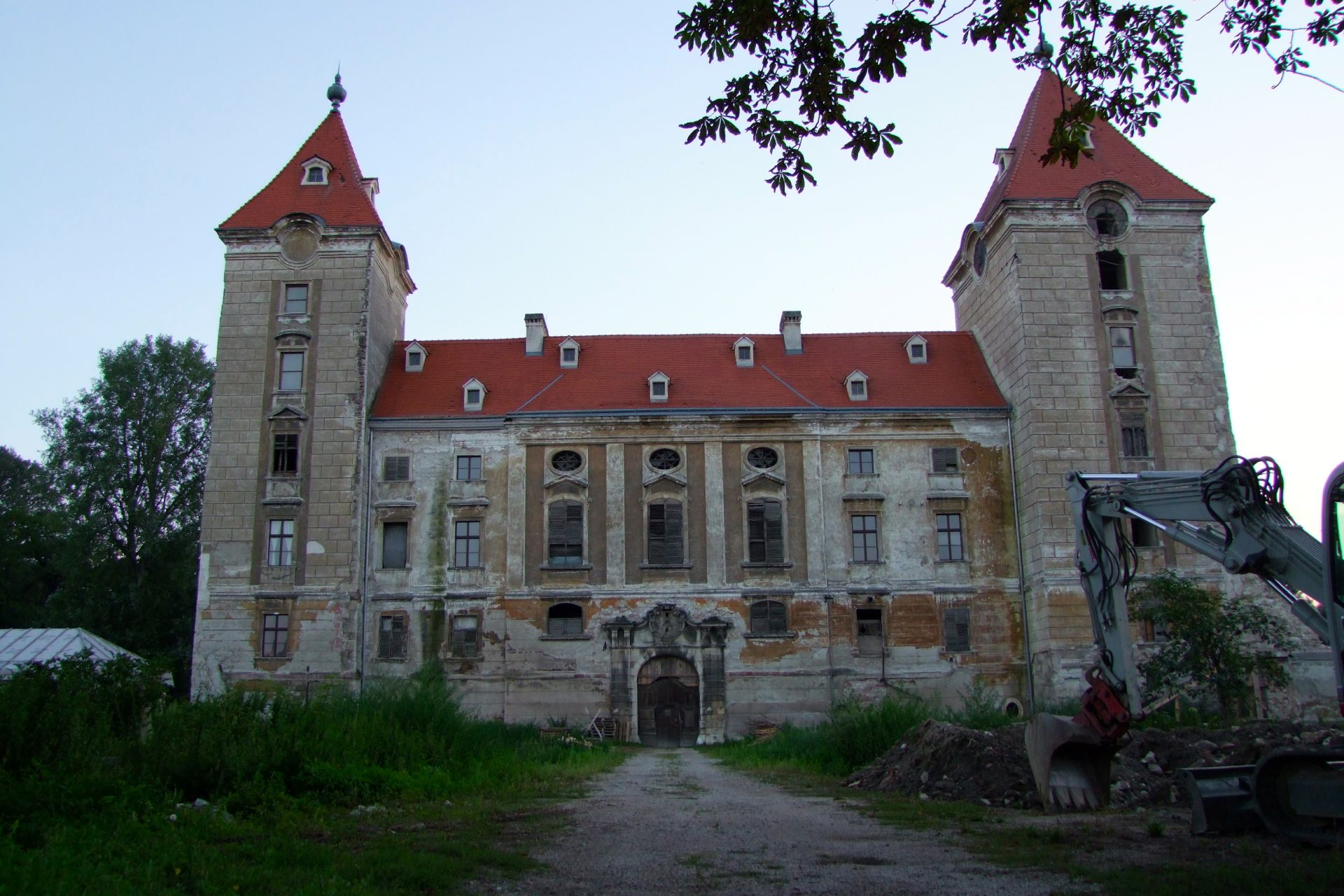
- Ebenfurth Castle

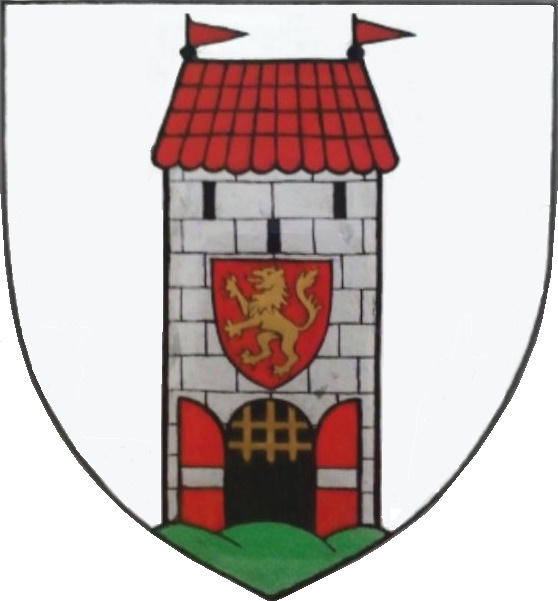
- Coat of arms

- Location within Austria
- Coordinates: 47°52′33″N 16°22′25″E
- Country: Austria
- State: Lower Austria
- District: Wiener Neustadt-Land

Government
  - Mayor: Alfredo Rosenmaier (SPÖ)

Area
  - Total: 23.58 km^{2} (9.10 sq mi)
- Elevation: 230 m (750 ft)

Population (2018-01-01)
  - Total: 3,170
  - Density: 134/km^{2} (348/sq mi)
- Time zone: UTC+1 (CET)
  - Summer (DST): UTC+2 (CEST)
- Postal code: 2490, 2601, 2603
- Area code: 02624
- Vehicle registration: WB
- Website: www.ebenfurth.at

Ebenfurth (Hungarian: Ebenfurt) is a municipality in the district of Wiener Neustadt-Land in the Austrian state of Lower Austria. In 2010, Serbian folk singer Dragana Mirković and her husband Toni Bijelić bought the Ebenfurth castle where they now live.

== Neighbouring municipalities ==
- Neufeld an der Leitha (southeast, twinned city), Hornstein
- Eggendorf, Zillingdorf, Lichtenwörth (south)
- Haschendorf, Pottendorf (north)

== Population ==
Historical population
| Year | Pop. | ±% |
|---|---|---|
| 1869 | 2,513 | — |
| 1880 | 2,435 | −3.1% |
| 1890 | 2,397 | −1.6% |
| 1900 | 2,194 | −8.5% |
| 1910 | 2,241 | +2.1% |
| 1923 | 2,503 | +11.7% |
| 1934 | 2,785 | +11.3% |
| 1939 | 2,785 | +0.0% |
| 1951 | 2,704 | −2.9% |
| 1961 | 2,448 | −9.5% |
| 1971 | 2,342 | −4.3% |
| 1981 | 2,272 | −3.0% |
| 1991 | 2,359 | +3.8% |
| 2001 | 2,609 | +10.6% |
| 2011 | 2,910 | +11.5% |
| 2015 | 3,013 | +3.5% |
