= Gaibing wuyin jiyun =

Chinese rhyme dictionary compiled during the Jin dynasty

Gaibing wuyin jiyun (Wuyin jiyun)

Gaibing wuyin jiyun (simplified Chinese: 改并五音集韵; traditional Chinese: 改并五音集韻; pinyin: Gǎibìng wǔyīn jíyùn; Wade–Giles: Kai-ping wu-yin chi-yün), abbreviated as Wuyin jiyun (simplified Chinese: 五音集韵; traditional Chinese: 五音集韻; pinyin: Wǔyīn jíyùn; Wade–Giles: Wu-yin chi-yün), is a Chinese rhyme dictionary (yunshu 韻书) compiled by Han Daozhao 韩道昭 in the 13th century during the Jin dynasty. It is originally a revised edition of Jing Pu's 荆璞 Wuyin jiyun, with the official title Gaibing wuyin jiyun (改併五音集韻).

== Introduction ==
According to the preface of the Zhiyuan gengyin chongkan Gaibing wuyin jiyun (《至元庚寅重刊改併五音集韻序》), the preface (xu) was written in the first year of the Chongqing era (崇慶) of Jin Emperor Weishao, on the day of the winter solstice of the year renshen = 1212 CE, approximately 40 years before the publication of Liu Yuan's 劉淵 Renzi xinkan Libu yunlüe 壬子新刊禮部韻略.

The work is primarily based on the Guangyun, but classifies 160 rhyme groups (yunbu 韵部), i.e., 46 fewer than the Guangyun with its 206 rhyme groups, but 53/54 more than the Renzi xinkan Libu yunlüe with its 107/106 rhyme groups.

For example, the character jian (Chinese: 聻; pinyin: jiàn) is defined in the Wuyin jiyun as follows (in the translation by Judith T. Zeitlin):

"When people die, they become ghosts, and when people see ghosts, they fear them. When ghosts die, they become jian, and when ghosts see jian, they are frightened. If one inscribes this character in seal script and fixes it above the doorway, then all baleful ghosts will keep their distance for a thousand li."

The Hanyu da zidian (HYDZD) refers to a woodblock edition from the Wanli era (1573–1620) of the Ming dynasty.

== See also ==
- Glossary on the Historical Phonology of Chinese (in German)

== Bibliography ==
- Hanyu da zidian. 1993 (one-volume edition)
- A. v. Rosthorn: Studien zur chinesischen Lautgeschichte. Hölder-Pichler-Tempsky, Wien und Leipzig 1942
