= Michael Drga =

Austrian footballer

Personal information
- Date of birth: 4 February 1995 (age 31)
- Place of birth: Ebenfurth, Austria
- Height: 1.75 m (5 ft 9 in)
- Position: Forward

Team information
- Current team: FCM Traiskirchen
- Number: 17

Youth career
- 2002–2006: Neufeld/Leitha
- 2006–2008: ASV Siegendorf
- 2008–2013: Red Bull Salzburg

Senior career*
Years	Team	Apps	(Gls)
2013–2016	SKN St. Pölten II	64	(21)
2014–2016	SKN St. Pölten	13	(0)
2017–2018	SV Mattersburg	0	(0)
2018–2020	SKU Amstetten	51	(8)
2020–2021	SK Vorwärts Steyr	21	(3)
2021–	FCM Traiskirchen	6	(0)

International career^{‡}
2010	Austria U-16	1	(0)
2011	Austria U-17	3	(0)
- * Club domestic league appearances and goals as of 10 September 2021 ‡ National team caps and goals as of 26 May 2016 (UTC)

Michael Drga (born 4 February 1995) is an Austrian footballer who plays for FCM Traiskirchen in the Austrian Regionalliga East.
