= Karl Wegerer =

Austrian politician (1897–1965)

Karl Wegerer (20 September 1897 in Matzendorf-Hölles, Austria – 3 December 1965) was an Austrian ÖVP politician and farmer. Wegerer was a member of the Landtag of Lower Austria from 1949 until 1954.

Wegerer attended elementary school and continued his education at the agricultural school in Tulln an der Donau after finishing primary school. After graduating from the agricultural school, he became a farmer and subsequently worked as a farmer in Matzendorf-Hölles. Wegerer was also involved in politics from an early age and was elected municipal councillor in 1921. From 1929 to 1938 he held the office of mayor in his home municipality and became a municipal councillor again after the end of the Second World War in 1945. Between 1950 and 1960 he again held the office of mayor and was active in several functions in agricultural cooperatives. Wegerer represented the ÖVP in the Landtag of Lower Austria between 5 November 1949 and 10 November 1954.
