= Walpersbach =

- Municipality
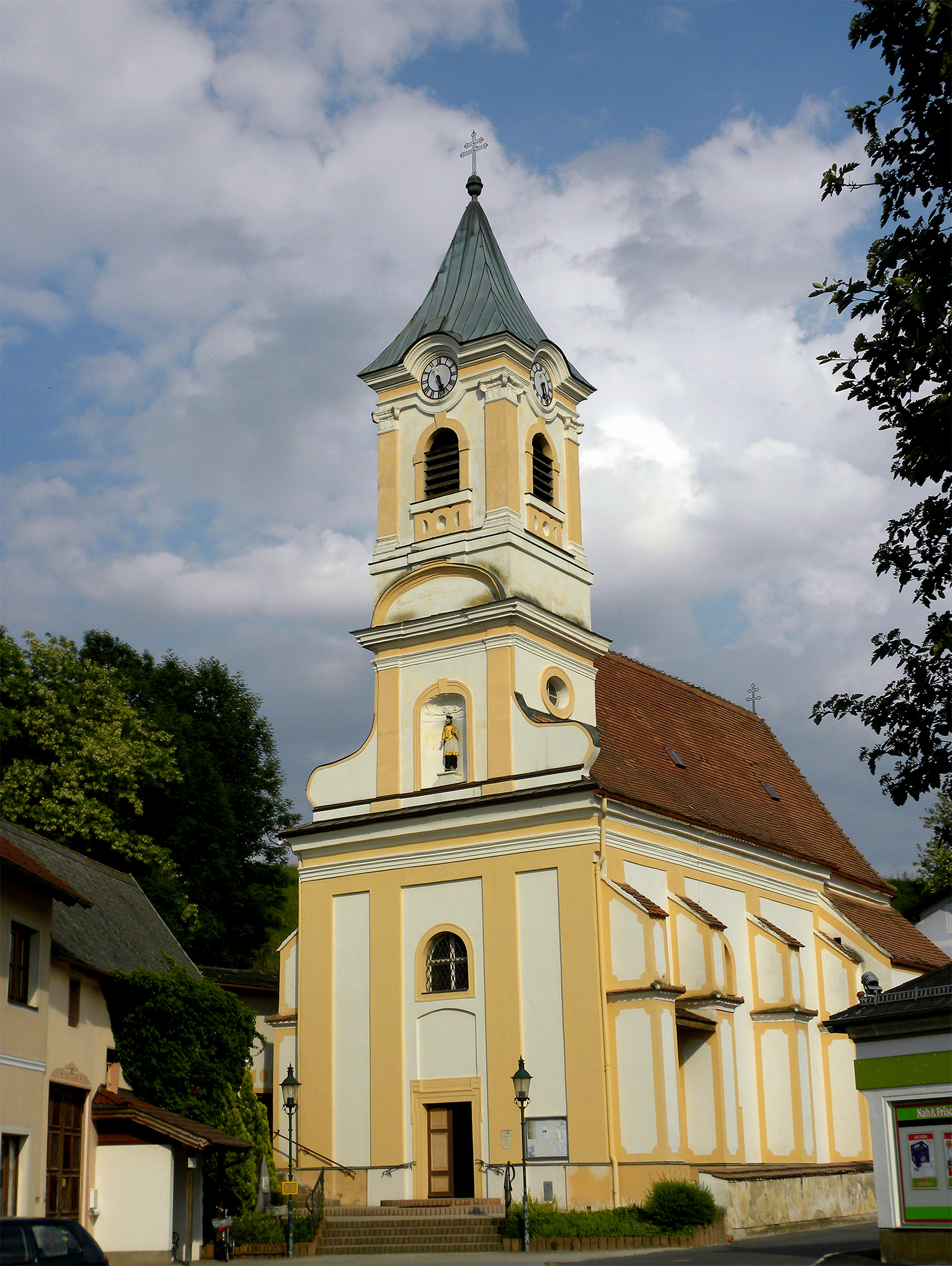
- Walpersbach parish church

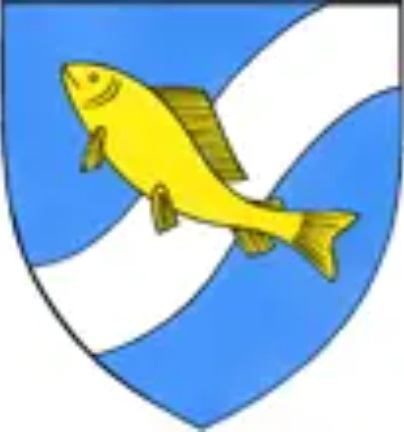
- Coat of arms

- Location within Austria
- Coordinates: 47°43′00″N 16°14′00″E
- Country: Austria
- State: Lower Austria
- District: Wiener Neustadt-Land

Government
  - Mayor: Franz Breitsching (ÖVP)

Area
  - Total: 16.46 km^{2} (6.36 sq mi)
- Elevation: 317 m (1,040 ft)

Population (2018-01-01)
  - Total: 1,125
  - Density: 68.35/km^{2} (177.0/sq mi)
- Time zone: UTC+1 (CET)
  - Summer (DST): UTC+2 (CEST)
- Postal code: 2822
- Area code: 02627
- Vehicle registration: WB
- Website: www.walpersbach.gv.at

Walpersbach is a municipality in the district of Wiener Neustadt-Land in the Austrian state of Lower Austria.

== Geography ==
Walpersbach is in the Industrieviertel (industrial area) of Lower Austria. Its cadastral communities are Klingfurth, Schleinz and Walpersbach.

== Population ==
Historical population
Year	Pop.	±%
1971	1,016	—
1981	945	−7.0%
1991	989	+4.7%
2001	1,048	+6.0%
2010	1,062	+1.3%

== Politics ==
The mayor of the municipality is Franz Breitsching, and its chief officer is Elisabeth Hafenscher.
