= Kirchschlag in der Buckligen Welt =

- Municipality
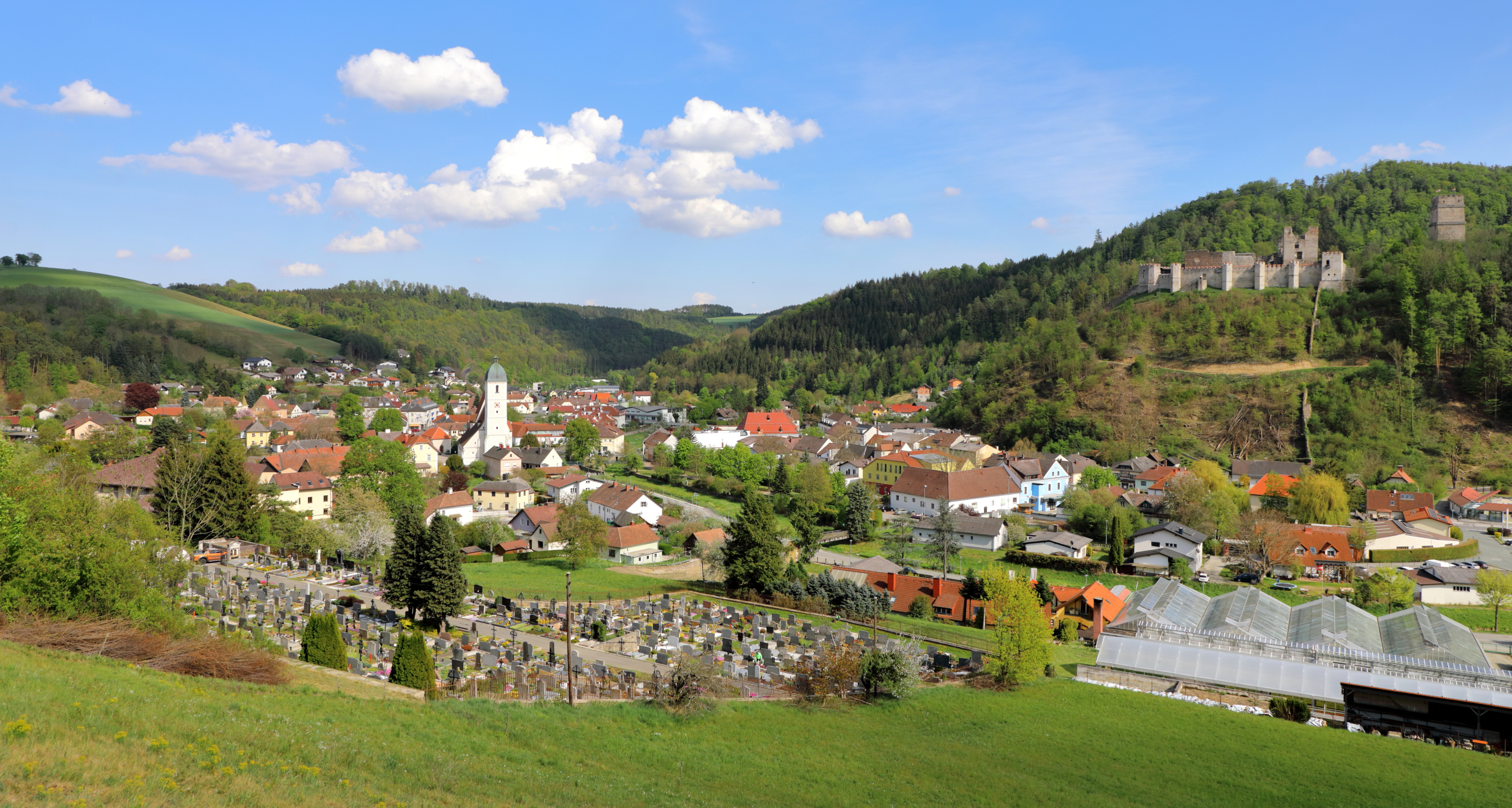

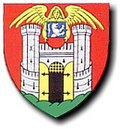
- Coat of arms

- Location within Austria
- Coordinates: 47°30′00″N 16°17′00″E
- Country: Austria
- State: Lower Austria
- District: Wiener Neustadt-Land

Government
  - Mayor: Franz Pichler-Holzer (ÖVP)

Area
  - Total: 57.97 km^{2} (22.38 sq mi)
- Elevation: 417 m (1,368 ft)

Population (2018-01-01)
  - Total: 2,889
  - Density: 49.84/km^{2} (129.1/sq mi)
- Time zone: UTC+1 (CET)
  - Summer (DST): UTC+2 (CEST)
- Postal code: 2860
- Area code: 02646
- Vehicle registration: WB
- Website: https://www.kirchschlag-bw.gv.at/

Kirchschlag in der Buckligen Welt is a municipality in the district of Wiener Neustadt-Land in the Austrian state of Lower Austria.

== Population ==
Historical population
Year	Pop.	±%
1869	2,779	—
1880	2,840	+2.2%
1890	2,705	−4.8%
1900	2,800	+3.5%
1910	2,661	−5.0%
1923	2,625	−1.4%
1934	2,632	+0.3%
1939	2,513	−4.5%
1951	2,649	+5.4%
1961	2,740	+3.4%
1971	2,928	+6.9%
1981	2,974	+1.6%
1991	3,014	+1.3%
2001	2,960	−1.8%
2011	2,919	−1.4%

== Culture ==
Kirchschlag is one of 12 locations (Passionsspielorte) in Austria performing Passion Plays. A Passion Play is performed every five years and the next will be 2020. This is marked by increased beard growth in the male population starting the year prior to the play.
