= Katzelsdorf =

- Municipality
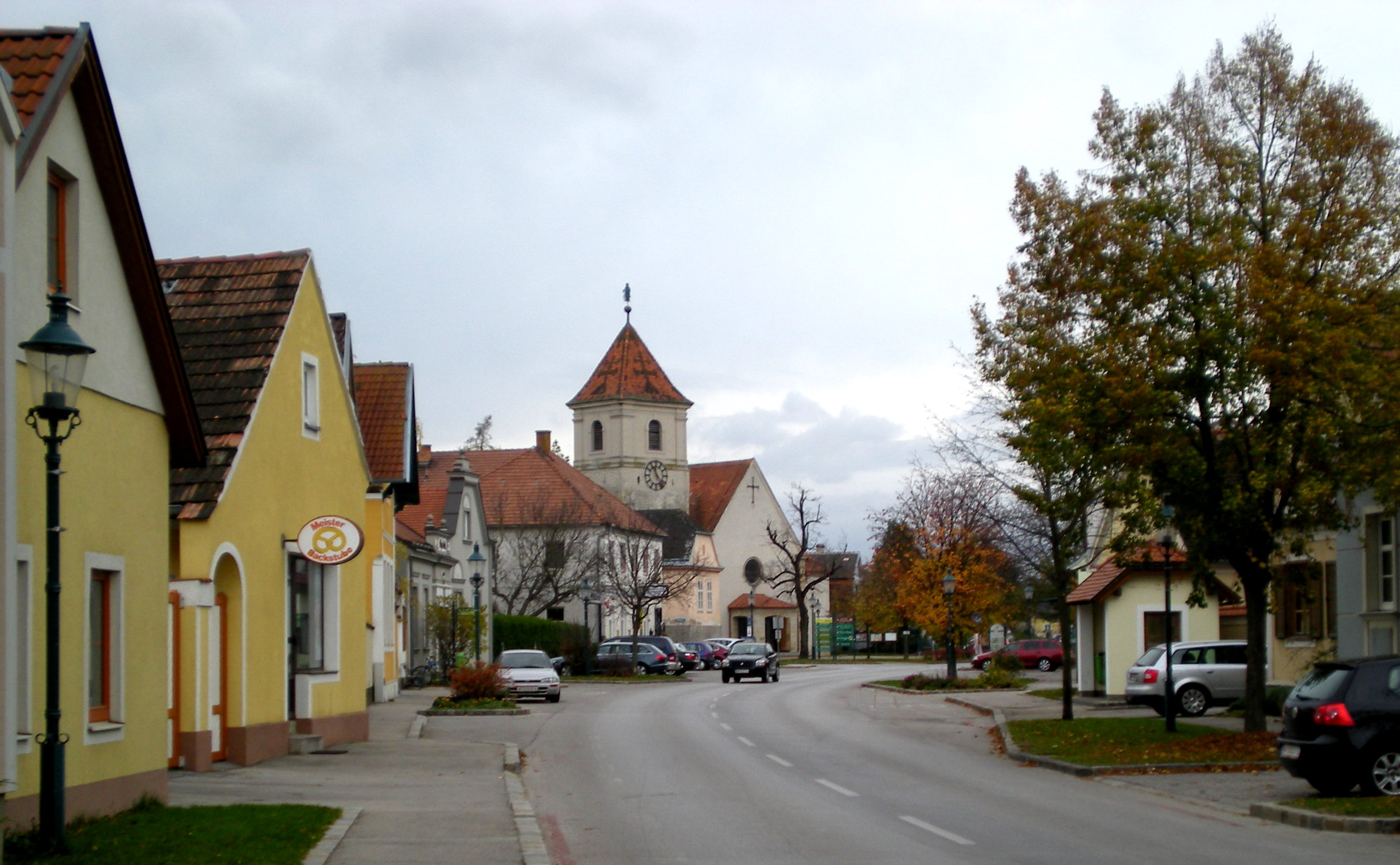

- Coat of arms

- Location within Austria
- Coordinates: 47°46′44″N 16°16′25″E
- Country: Austria
- State: Lower Austria
- District: Wiener Neustadt-Land

Government
  - Mayor: Michael Nistl (ÖVP)

Area
  - Total: 16.26 km^{2} (6.28 sq mi)
- Elevation: 273 m (896 ft)

Population (2018-01-01)
  - Total: 3,257
  - Density: 200.3/km^{2} (518.8/sq mi)
- Time zone: UTC+1 (CET)
  - Summer (DST): UTC+2 (CEST)
- Postal code: 2801
- Area code: 02622
- Vehicle registration: WB
- Website: www.katzelsdorf.at

Katzelsdorf is a municipality in the district of Wiener Neustadt-Land in Lower Austria, Austria. It is situated at the foot of the Rosalia Mountains, on the river Leitha, 5 km southeast of Wiener Neustadt.

== Population ==
Historical population
Year	Pop.	±%
1869	871	—
1880	881	+1.1%
1890	977	+10.9%
1900	1,076	+10.1%
1910	1,131	+5.1%
1923	1,270	+12.3%
1934	1,305	+2.8%
1939	1,347	+3.2%
1951	1,237	−8.2%
1961	1,342	+8.5%
1971	1,648	+22.8%
1981	1,883	+14.3%
1991	2,294	+21.8%
2001	2,827	+23.2%
2011	3,201	+13.2%
