= Weikersdorf am Steinfelde =

- Municipality
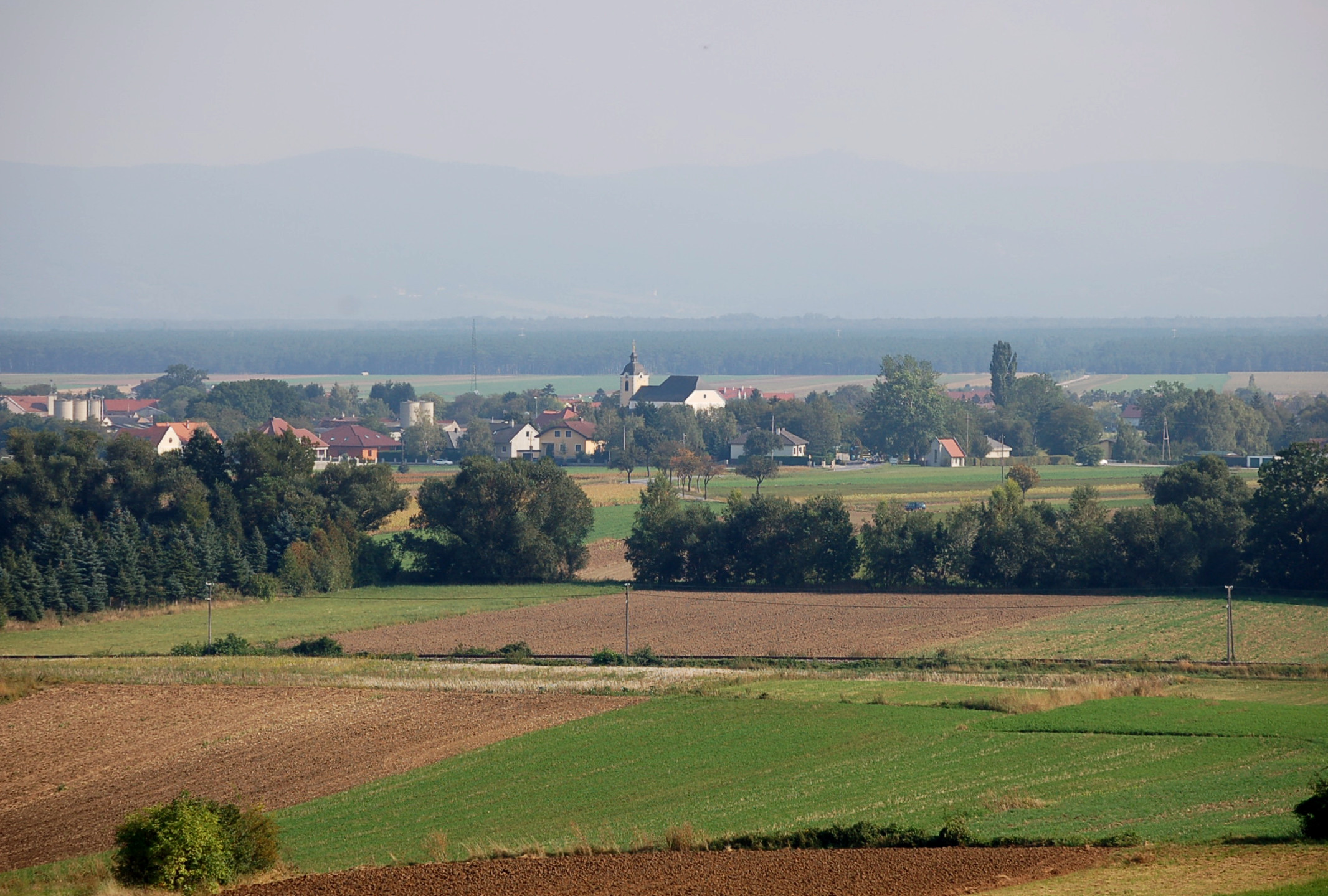

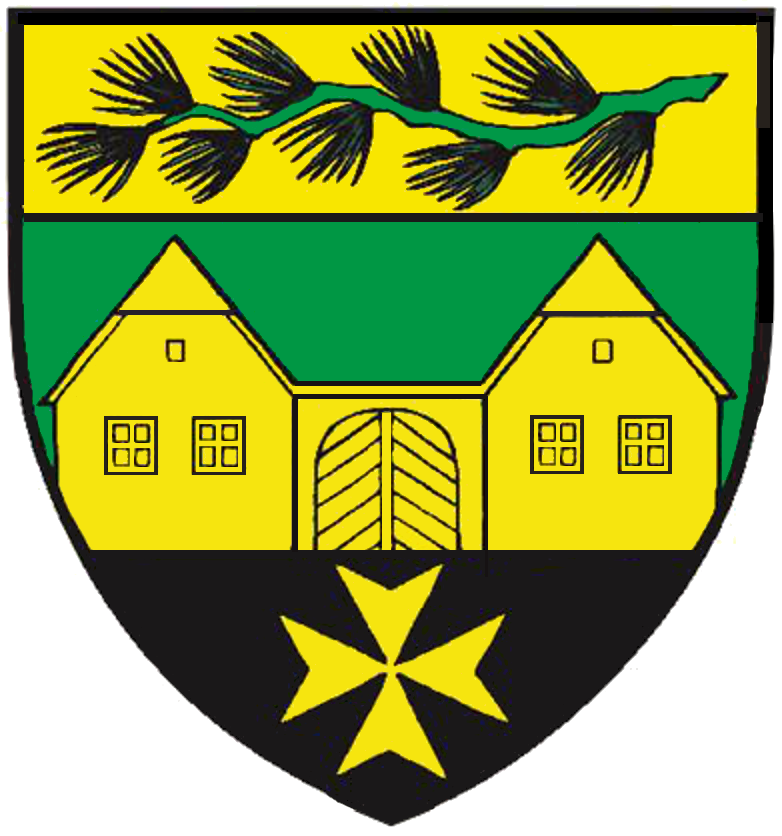
- Coat of arms

- Location within Austria
- Coordinates: 47°48′20″N 16°08′35″E
- Country: Austria
- State: Lower Austria
- District: Wiener Neustadt-Land

Government
  - Mayor: Manfred Rottensteiner (ÖVP)

Area
  - Total: 14.22 km^{2} (5.49 sq mi)
- Elevation: 307 m (1,007 ft)

Population (2018-01-01)
  - Total: 1,066
  - Density: 74.96/km^{2} (194.2/sq mi)
- Time zone: UTC+1 (CET)
  - Summer (DST): UTC+2 (CEST)
- Postal code: 2722
- Area code: 02638
- Vehicle registration: WB
- Website: www.weikersdorf.at

Weikersdorf am Steinfelde is a municipality in the district of Wiener Neustadt-Land in the Austrian state of Lower Austria.

== Population ==
Historical population
Year	Pop.	±%
1869	747	—
1880	770	+3.1%
1890	750	−2.6%
1900	763	+1.7%
1910	769	+0.8%
1923	818	+6.4%
1934	785	−4.0%
1939	730	−7.0%
1951	717	−1.8%
1961	748	+4.3%
1971	865	+15.6%
1981	937	+8.3%
1991	967	+3.2%
2001	967	+0.0%
2011	1,073	+11.0%
