= Arthur von Rosthorn =

Austrian sinologist, diplomat and writer (1862–1945)

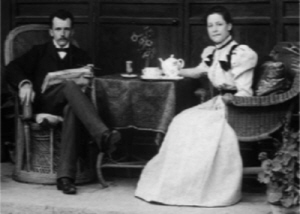
Arthur and Paula von Rosthorn

The Salt Administration of Ssŭchʻuan by Arthur von Rosthorn

Arthur von Rosthorn (14 April 1862, Vienna – 17 December 1945, Oed) was an Austrian diplomat and sinologist.

He obtained his education in Vienna and Oxford, where he was a student of sinologist James Legge. From 1883 to 1893 he was associated with the Seezollverwaltung (customs administration) in China. In 1895 he received his doctorate from the University of Leipzig, and afterwards worked for the Austrian diplomatic service; serving as a legation secretary and counselor in China, and later as an envoy in Tehran (1906–11) and Beijing (1911–17). In 1922 he was named an honorary professor at the University of Vienna, where up until 1939, he taught classes in Chinese language, literature and history.

He was an editor of the journal "Wiener Beiträge zur Kunst- und Kulturgeschichte Asiens Jahrbuch" (Vienna contributions to the art and cultural history of Asia). Since 1986 the "Rosthorn-Medaille" is awarded to individuals or groups who have rendered special services to Sino-Austrian relations. It is sponsored by the Österreich-Chinesischen Gesellschaft (ÖCGF, Austrian-Chinese Society) and the Ludwig Boltzmann Institute.

== Selected works ==
- The salt administration of Ssŭchʻuan; published in English in 1893.
- Die ausbreitung der chinesischen macht in südwestlicher richtung bis zum vierten jahrhundert, 1895 – The propagation of Chinese southwestern migration in the fourth century AD.
- Das soziale leben der Chinesen, 1919 – The social life of the Chinese people.
- Die anfänge der chinesischen geschichtschreibung, 1920 – The beginnings of Chinese historiography.
