= Waidmannsfeld =

- Municipality
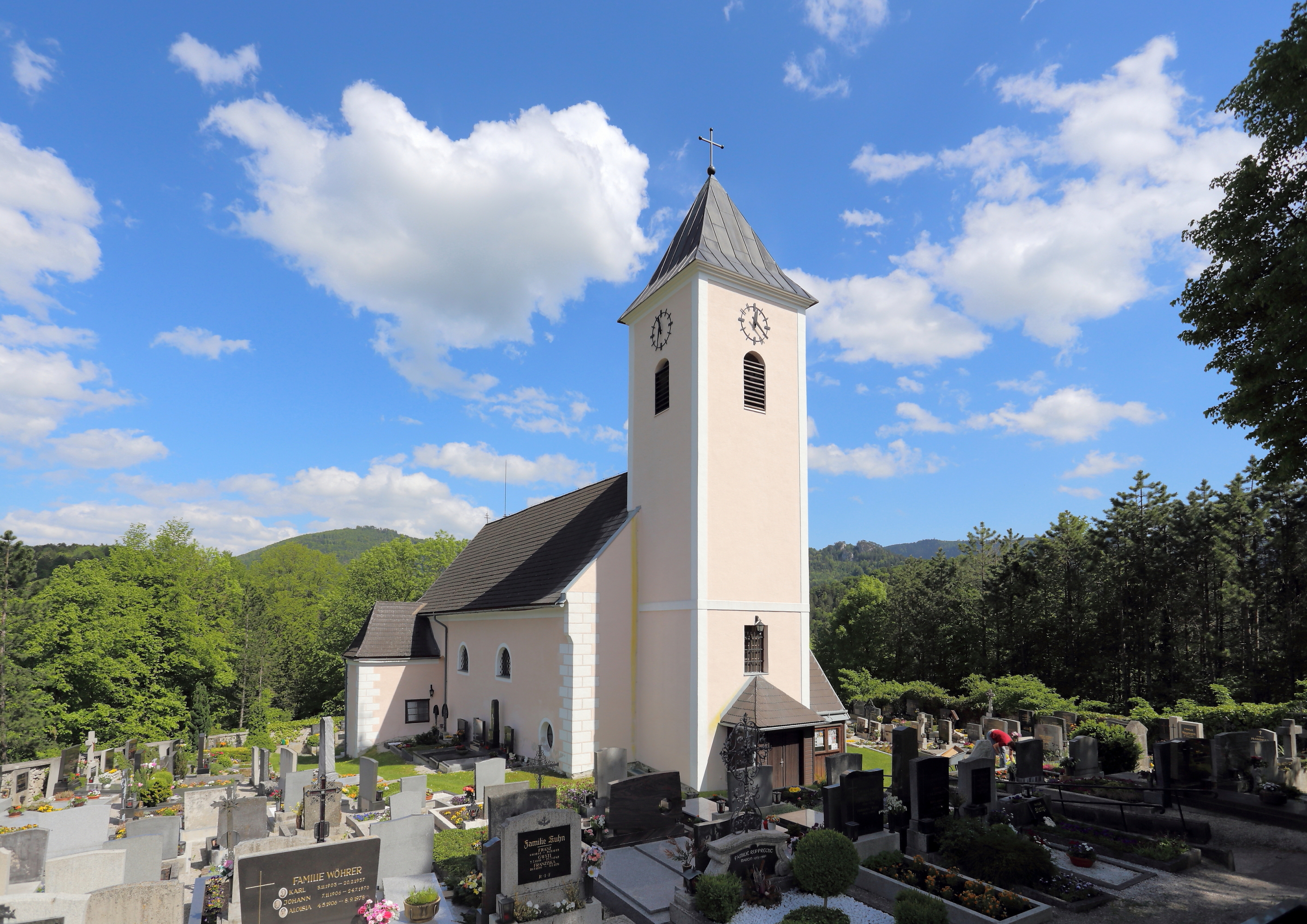
- Waidmannsfeld parish church

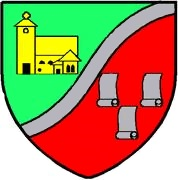
- Coat of arms

- Location within Austria
- Coordinates: 47°52′00″N 15°58′00″E
- Country: Austria
- State: Lower Austria
- District: Wiener Neustadt-Land

Government
  - Mayor: Andreas Knabel (SPÖ)

Area
  - Total: 21.39 km^{2} (8.26 sq mi)
- Elevation: 495 m (1,624 ft)

Population (2018-01-01)
  - Total: 1,515
  - Density: 70.83/km^{2} (183.4/sq mi)
- Time zone: UTC+1 (CET)
  - Summer (DST): UTC+2 (CEST)
- Postal code: 2763
- Area code: 02632
- Vehicle registration: WB
- Website: www.waidmannsfeld.at

Waidmannsfeld is a municipality in the Wiener Neustadt-Land District, Lower Austria, Austria. The forested portion of the municipality amounts to 77.9% of its area. Waidmannsfeld consists of the cadastral communities Neusiedl and Waidmannsfeld.

== Population ==
Historical population
Year	Pop.	±%
1971	1,830	—
1981	1,864	+1.9%
1991	1,735	−6.9%
2001	1,816	+4.7%

== Economy ==
In 1999 there were 34 companies with agricultural or forestry related activities. In 2001 there were 51 jobs apart from agriculture, and 790 persons were employed. The activity rate was 45.04% in 2001.
