= Felixdorf =

- Municipality
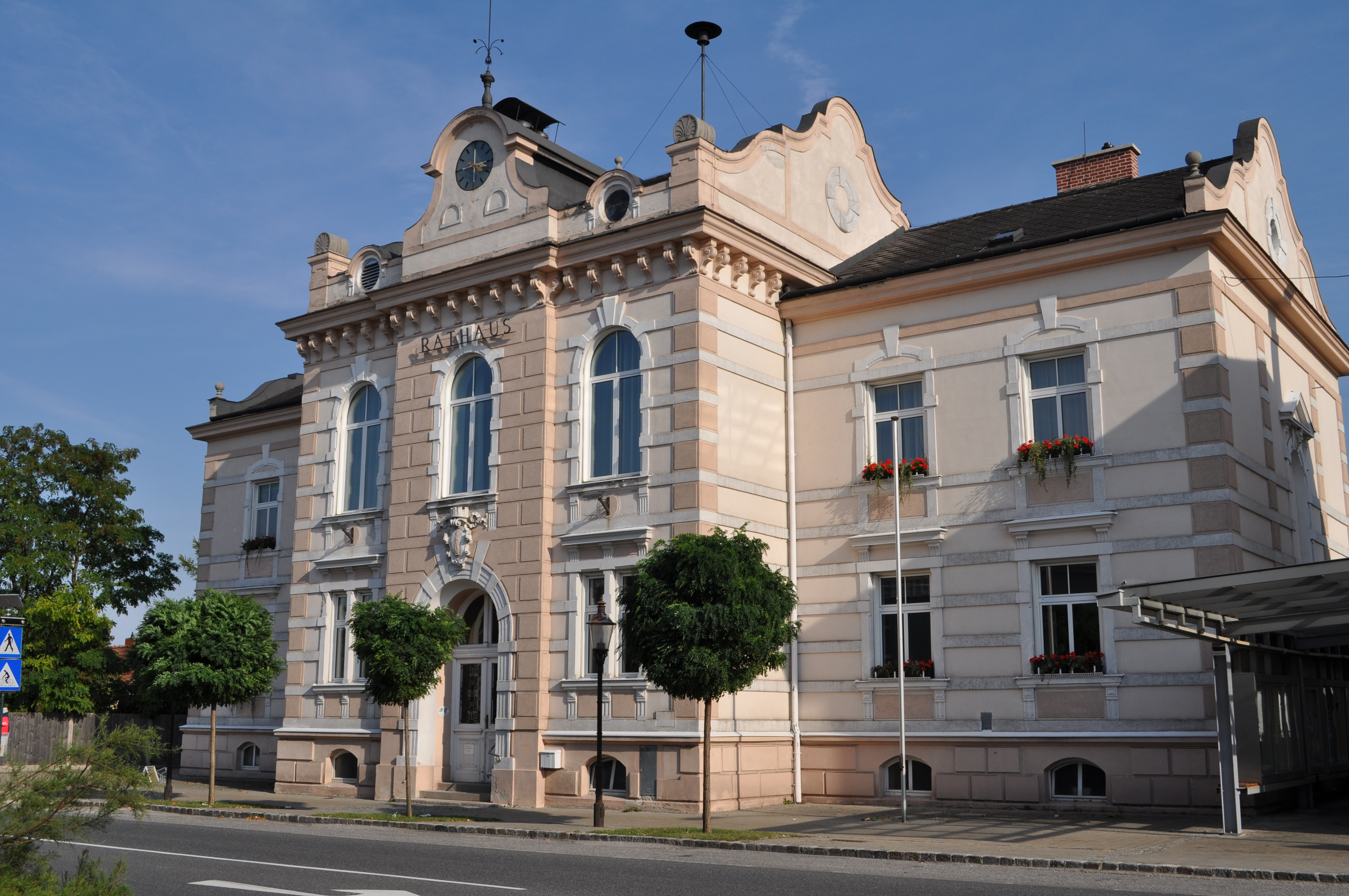
- Felixdorf town hall

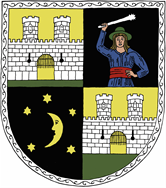
- Coat of arms

- Location within Austria
- Coordinates: 47°53′00″N 16°14′00″E
- Country: Austria
- State: Lower Austria
- District: Wiener Neustadt-Land

Government
  - Mayor: Karl Stieber (SPÖ)

Area
  - Total: 2.54 km^{2} (0.98 sq mi)
- Elevation: 282 m (925 ft)

Population (2018-01-01)
  - Total: 4,292
  - Density: 1,690/km^{2} (4,380/sq mi)
- Time zone: UTC+1 (CET)
  - Summer (DST): UTC+2 (CEST)
- Postal code: 2603
- Area code: 02628
- Vehicle registration: WB
- Website: www.felixdorf.gv.at

Felixdorf is a municipality in the district of Wiener Neustadt-Land in the Austrian state of Lower Austria.

== Population ==
Historical population
Year	Pop.	±%
1869	960	—
1880	1,787	+86.1%
1890	2,137	+19.6%
1900	2,635	+23.3%
1910	2,557	−3.0%
1923	2,230	−12.8%
1934	2,363	+6.0%
1939	2,370	+0.3%
1951	2,357	−0.5%
1961	2,484	+5.4%
1971	3,209	+29.2%
1981	3,801	+18.4%
1991	4,035	+6.2%
2001	4,288	+6.3%
2011	4,263	−0.6%

== Sport ==
The association football team SC Felixdorf play at the football grounds off the Steinfeldgasse/Stadiongasse. The easterly pitch adjacent to the Neugasse was a former venue for motorcycle speedway, which once hosted international fixtures including fixtures between Austria and Poland in 1984 and 1990.
