= Lichtenegg =

- Municipality
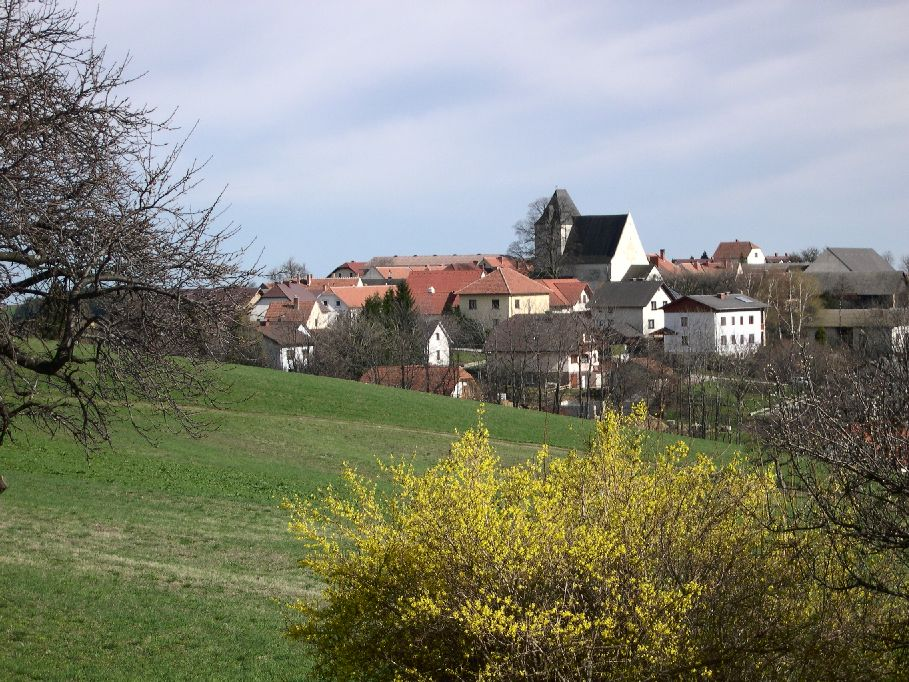
- View of Lichtenegg

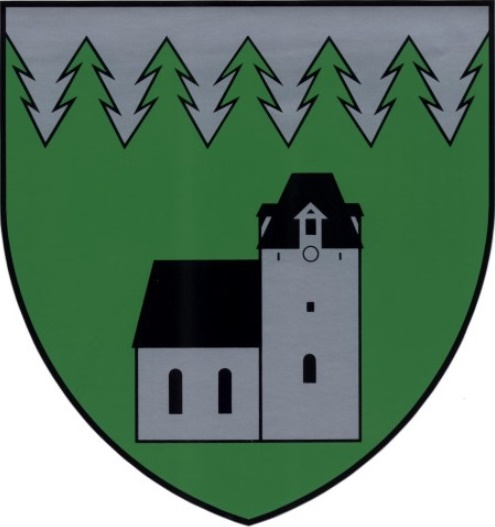
- Coat of arms

- Location within Austria
- Coordinates: 47°36′00″N 16°12′00″E
- Country: Austria
- State: Lower Austria
- District: Wiener Neustadt-Land

Government
  - Mayor: Josef Schrammel (ÖVP)

Area
  - Total: 35.4 km^{2} (13.7 sq mi)
- Elevation: 770 m (2,530 ft)

Population (2018-01-01)
  - Total: 1,034
  - Density: 29.2/km^{2} (75.7/sq mi)
- Time zone: UTC+1 (CET)
  - Summer (DST): UTC+2 (CEST)
- Postal code: 2813
- Area code: 02643
- Vehicle registration: WB
- Website: www.lichtenegg.at

Lichtenegg is a municipality in the district of Wiener Neustadt-Land in the Austrian state of Lower Austria.

== Population ==
Historical population
Year	Pop.	±%
1869	1,535	—
1880	1,506	−1.9%
1890	1,402	−6.9%
1900	1,246	−11.1%
1910	1,227	−1.5%
1923	1,286	+4.8%
1934	1,318	+2.5%
1939	1,286	−2.4%
1951	1,174	−8.7%
1961	1,093	−6.9%
1971	1,093	+0.0%
1981	1,062	−2.8%
1991	1,116	+5.1%
2001	1,078	−3.4%
2011	1,090	+1.1%
