= Schwarzenbach, Lower Austria =

Schwarzenbach
- Municipality
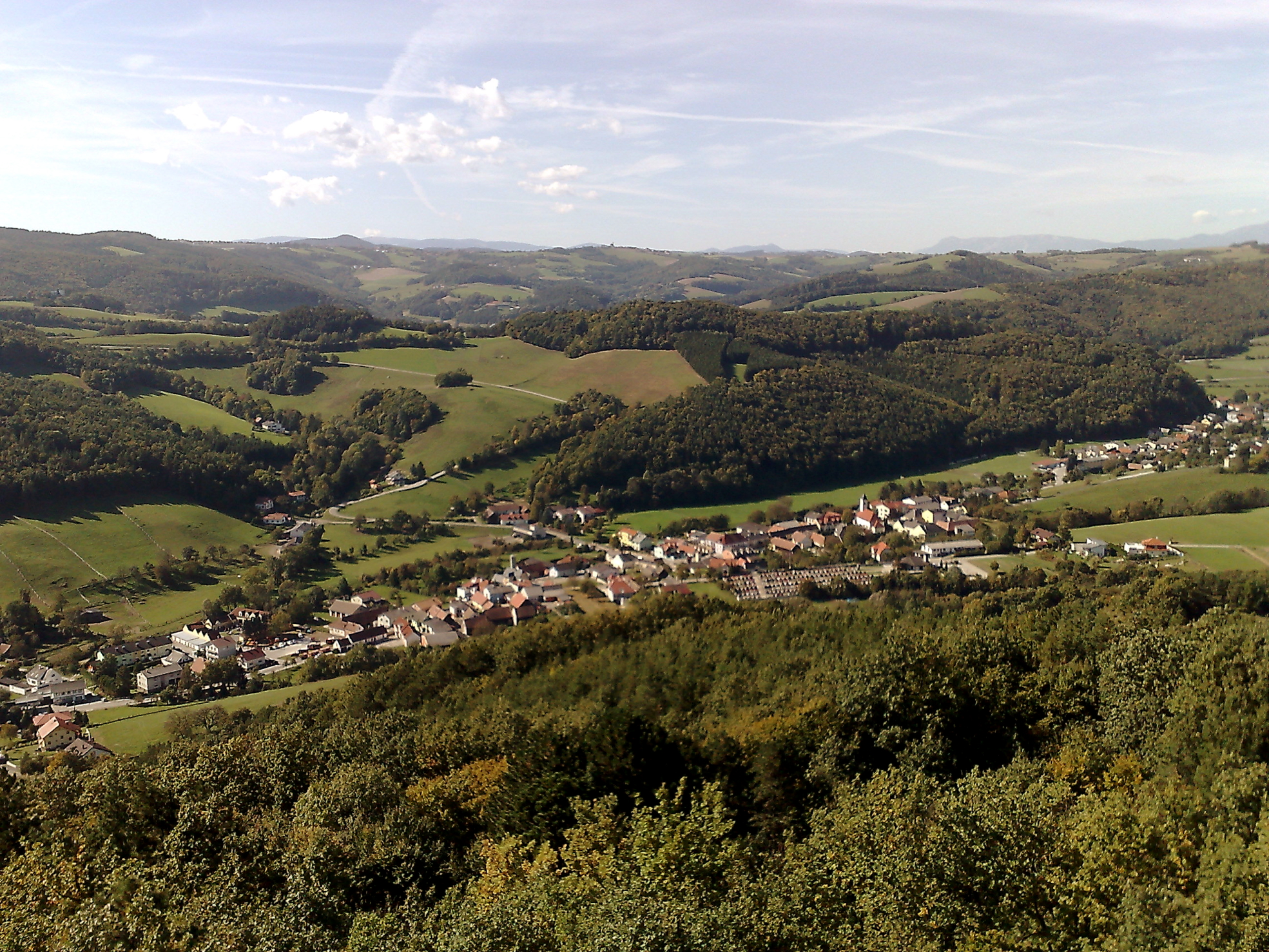
- View of Schwarzenbach

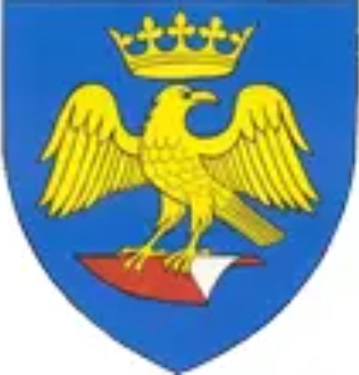
- Coat of arms

- Location within Austria
- Coordinates: 47°38′N 16°21′E
- Country: Austria
- State: Lower Austria
- District: Wiener Neustadt-Land

Government
  - Mayor: Bernd Rehberger (SPÖ)

Area
  - Total: 22.32 km^{2} (8.62 sq mi)
- Elevation: 383 m (1,257 ft)

Population (2018-01-01)
  - Total: 941
  - Density: 42.2/km^{2} (109/sq mi)
- Time zone: UTC+1 (CET)
  - Summer (DST): UTC+2 (CEST)
- Postal code: 2803
- Area code: 02645
- Vehicle registration: WB
- Website: www.schwarzenbach.gv.at

Schwarzenbach (Austrian German pronunciation: [ˈʃvartsn̩bax]) is a town in the Wiener Neustadt-Land district, Lower Austria, Austria. 48.22 percent of the municipality is forested. The area is divided into two districts: Schwarzenbach and Schwarzenbach (Zerstreut), the latter comprising the scattered settlements around the main village. There are 33 non-agricultural companies. 463 persons are employed. The activity rate in 2001 was 41.34%.

== Population ==
Historical population
Year	Pop.	±%
1971	1,212	—
1981	1,226	+1.2%
1991	1,228	+0.2%
2001	1,144	−6.8%

== History ==
An old Celtic settlement dating back to the 1st and the 2nd centuries has been excavated since 1992. The findings there show that the community was of great social and political importance.
