= Theresienfeld =

- Municipality
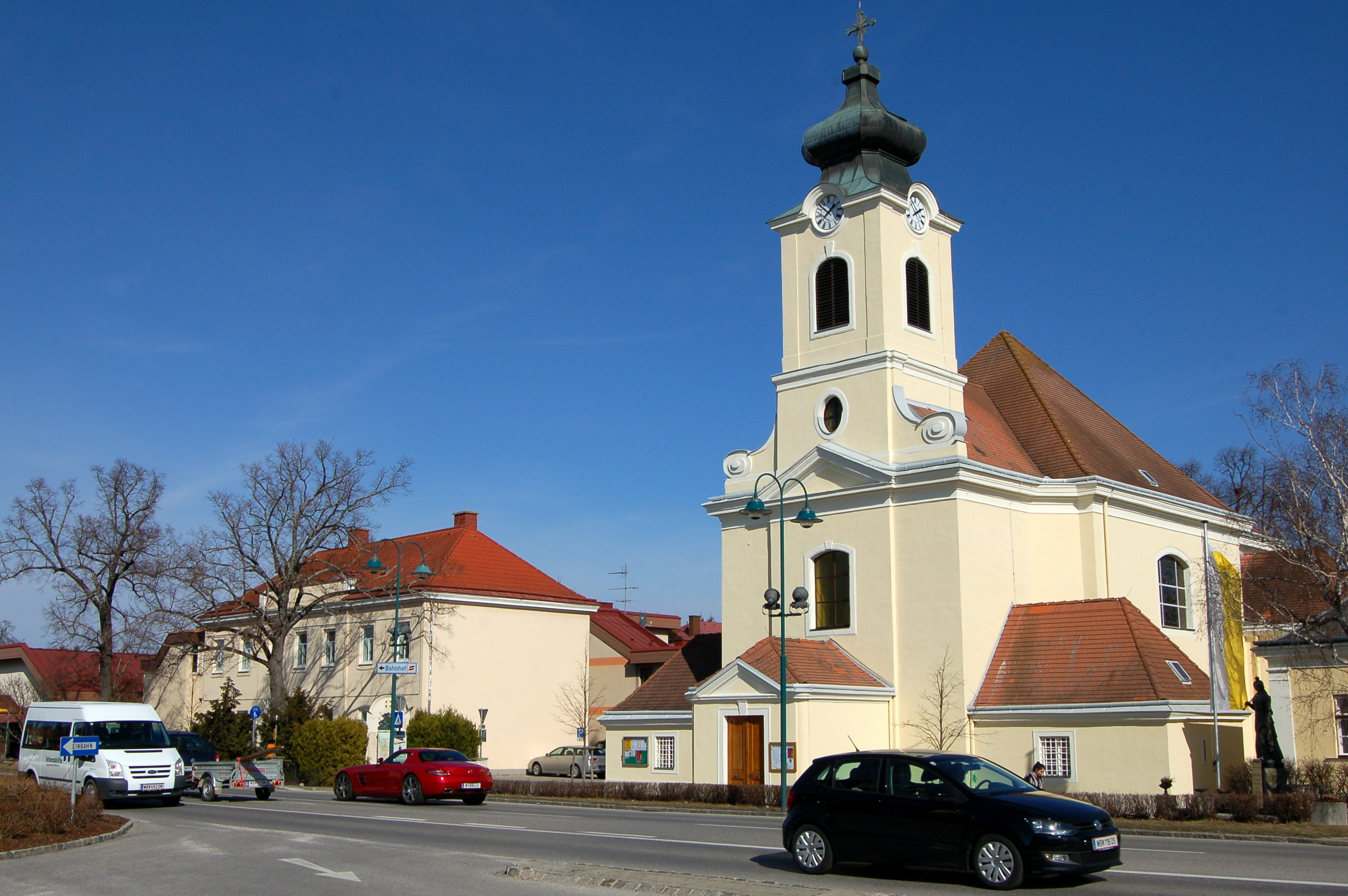
- Municipal office and the Holy Cross Church

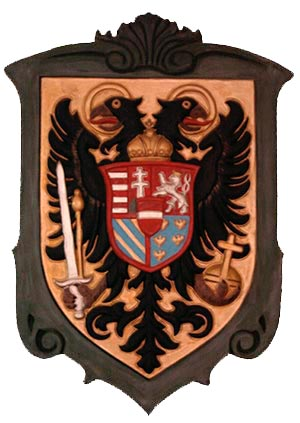
- Coat of arms

- Location within Austria
- Coordinates: 47°51′N 16°15′E
- Country: Austria
- State: Lower Austria
- District: Wiener Neustadt-Land

Government
  - Mayor: Ingrid Klauninger (SPÖ)

Area
  - Total: 11.44 km^{2} (4.42 sq mi)
- Elevation: 282 m (925 ft)

Population (2018-01-01)
  - Total: 3,485
  - Density: 304.6/km^{2} (789.0/sq mi)
- Time zone: UTC+1 (CET)
  - Summer (DST): UTC+2 (CEST)
- Postal code: 2604
- Area code: 02622
- Vehicle registration: WB
- Website: www.theresienfeld.gv.at

Theresienfeld is a town in the Wiener Neustadt-Land district of Lower Austria, in eastern Austria. It lies 5 km (3 miles) north of Wiener Neustadt, in the southern part of the Vienna Basin. Of its 11.47 km^{2} area, 3.40% is forested.

== Population ==
Historical population
Year	Pop.	±%
1971	1,115	—
1981	1,518	+36.1%
1991	1,963	+29.3%
2001	2,490	+26.8%
2005	2,703	+8.6%
2011	2,884	+6.7%

== History ==
Theresienfeld was founded in 1763 by Empress Maria Theresa, for the agricultural development of the area.

== Economy and education ==
In 2011, there were 169 non-agricultural jobs in the municipality, and 14 agriculturally and forestry related companies. 109 persons were unemployed.

Theresienfeld has two kindergartens, a primary school, and a vocational school.
