= Wiesmath =

- Municipality
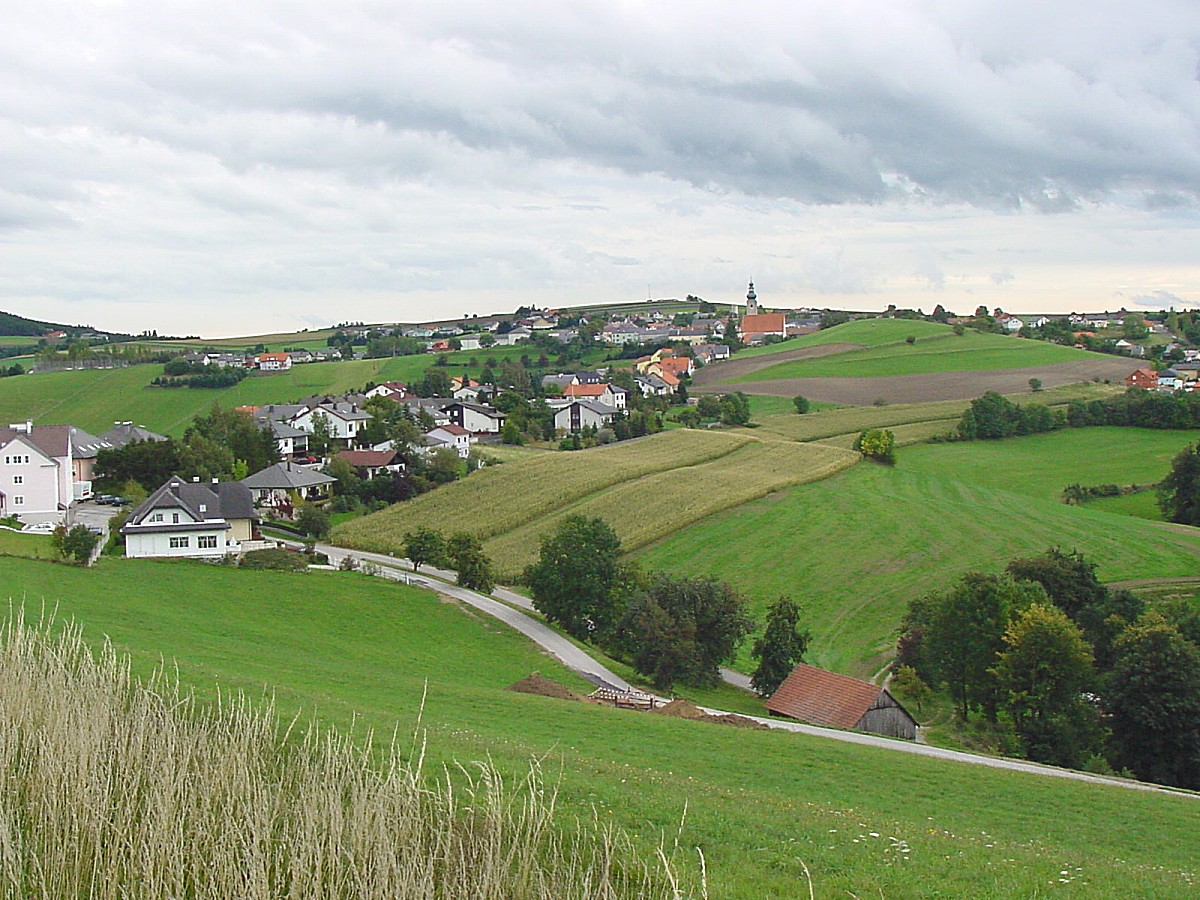

- Coat of arms

- Location within Austria
- Coordinates: 47°37′00″N 16°17′00″E
- Country: Austria
- State: Lower Austria
- District: Wiener Neustadt-Land

Government
  - Mayor: Roland Weber (ÖVP)

Area
  - Total: 38.48 km^{2} (14.86 sq mi)
- Elevation: 695 m (2,280 ft)

Population (2018-01-01)
  - Total: 1,509
  - Density: 39.22/km^{2} (101.6/sq mi)
- Time zone: UTC+1 (CET)
  - Summer (DST): UTC+2 (CEST)
- Postal code: 2811
- Area code: 02645
- Vehicle registration: WB
- Website: www.wiesmath.at

Wiesmath is a municipality in the district of Wiener Neustadt-Land in the Austrian state of Lower Austria.

== Population ==
Historical population
Year	Pop.	±%
1869	1,750	—
1880	1,994	+13.9%
1890	1,816	−8.9%
1900	1,903	+4.8%
1910	1,957	+2.8%
1923	1,931	−1.3%
1934	1,862	−3.6%
1939	1,962	+5.4%
1951	1,746	−11.0%
1961	1,586	−9.2%
1971	1,557	−1.8%
1981	1,604	+3.0%
1991	1,631	+1.7%
2001	1,599	−2.0%
2011	1,528	−4.4%
