= Bromberg, Lower Austria =

Bromberg
- Municipality
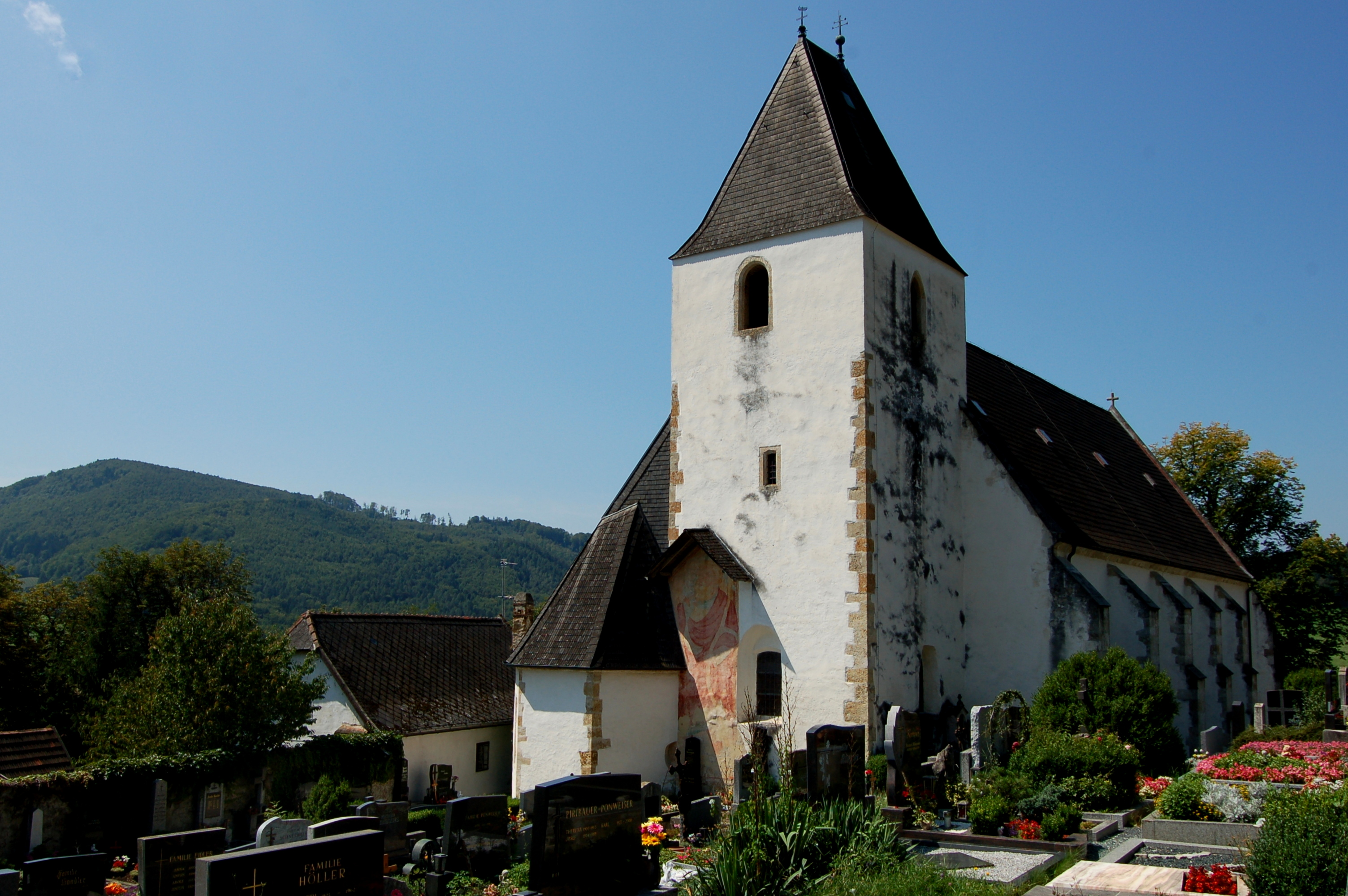
- Bromberg parish church

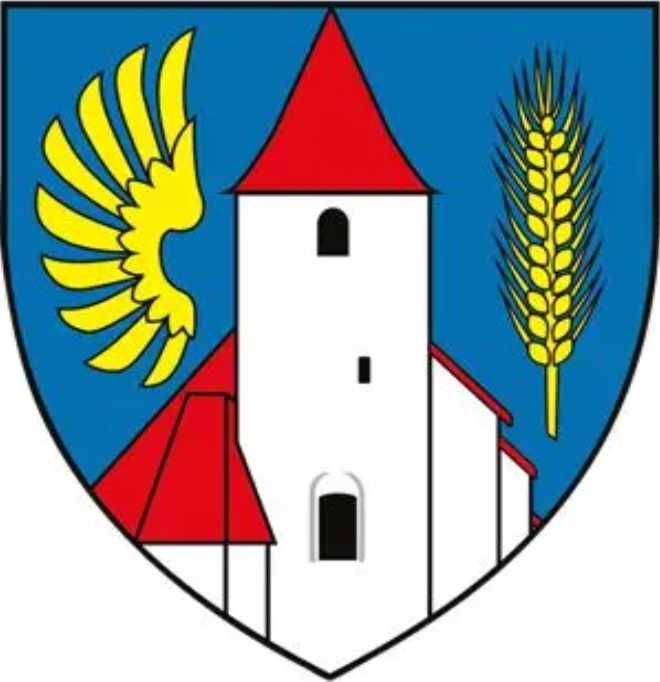
- Coat of arms

- Location within Austria Bromberg (Austria)
- Coordinates: 47°40′00″N 16°11′00″E
- Country: Austria
- State: Lower Austria
- District: Wiener Neustadt-Land

Government
  - Mayor: Josef Schrammel (ÖVP)

Area
  - Total: 30.89 km^{2} (11.93 sq mi)
- Elevation: 487 m (1,598 ft)

Population (2018-01-01)
  - Total: 1,232
  - Density: 39.88/km^{2} (103.3/sq mi)
- Time zone: UTC+1 (CET)
  - Summer (DST): UTC+2 (CEST)
- Postal code: 2802, 2811, 2813, 2822, 2833
- Area code: 02629
- Vehicle registration: WB
- Website: www.bromberg.at

Bromberg is a town in the district of Wiener Neustadt-Land in the Austrian state of Lower Austria.

== Population ==
Historical population
Year	Pop.	±%
1869	1,520	—
1880	1,708	+12.4%
1890	1,590	−6.9%
1900	1,546	−2.8%
1910	1,486	−3.9%
1923	1,528	+2.8%
1934	1,435	−6.1%
1939	1,291	−10.0%
1951	1,231	−4.6%
1961	1,065	−13.5%
1971	1,052	−1.2%
1981	1,162	+10.5%
1991	1,207	+3.9%
2001	1,193	−1.2%
2011	1,211	+1.5%
2015	1,232	+1.7%
