= Bad Schönau =

- Municipality
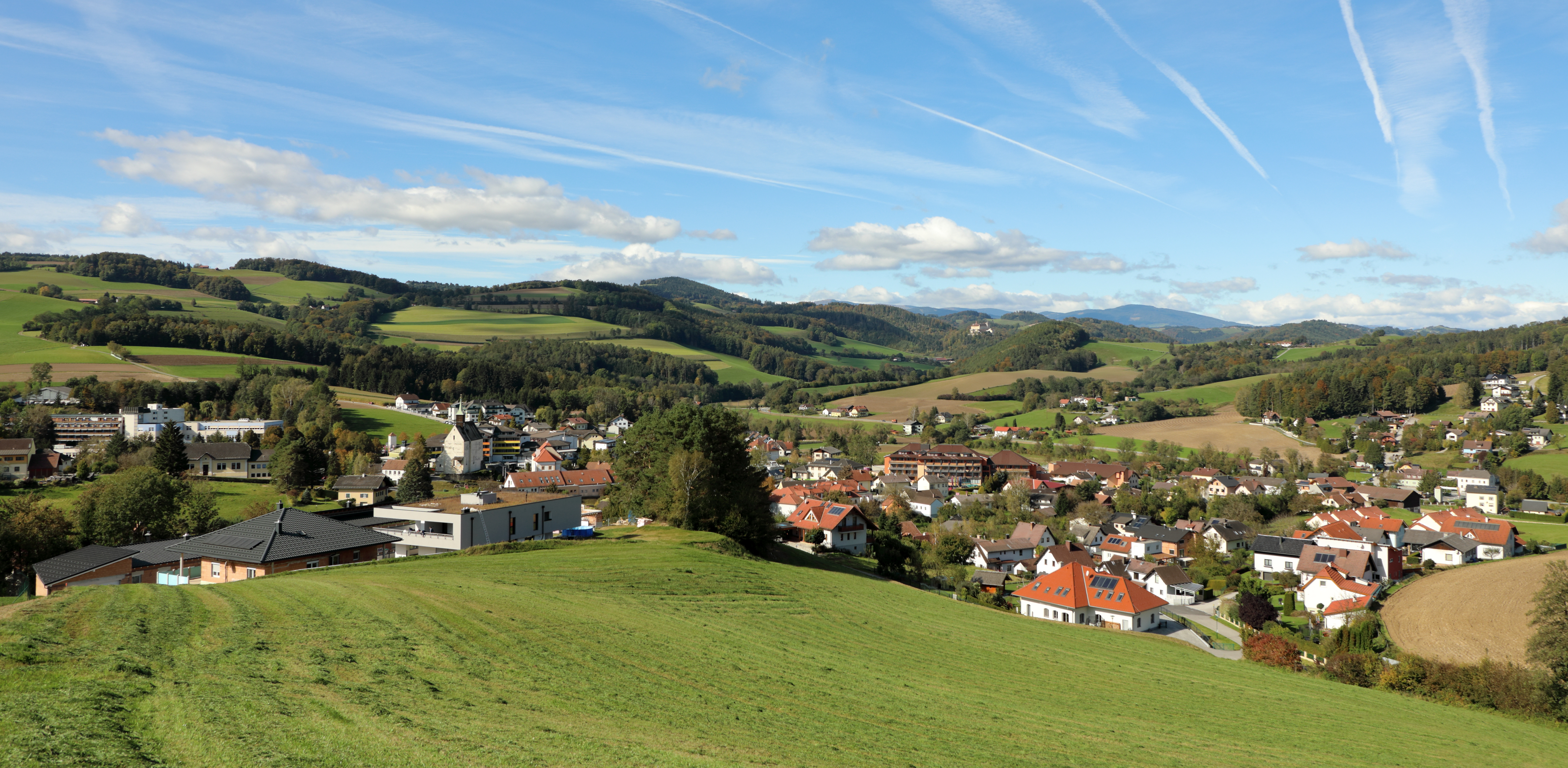
- Bad Schönau seen from the east

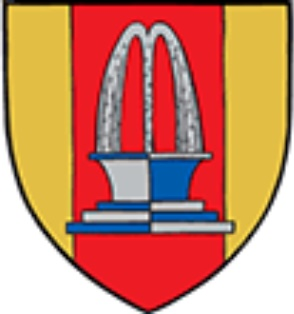
- Coat of arms

- Location within Austria
- Coordinates: 47°29′00″N 16°14′00″E
- Country: Austria
- State: Lower Austria
- District: Wiener Neustadt-Land

Government
  - Mayor: Ferdinand Schwarz (ÖVP)

Area
  - Total: 13.59 km^{2} (5.25 sq mi)
- Elevation: 490 m (1,610 ft)

Population (2018-01-01)
  - Total: 721
  - Density: 53.1/km^{2} (137/sq mi)
- Time zone: UTC+1 (CET)
  - Summer (DST): UTC+2 (CEST)
- Postal code: 2853
- Area code: 02646
- Vehicle registration: WB
- Website: www.bad-schoenau.gv.at

Bad Schönau (German: [baːt ˈʃøːnaʊ̯]) is a municipality in the district of Wiener Neustadt-Land in the Austrian state of Lower Austria.

== Population ==
Historical population
Year	Pop.	±%
1869	653	—
1880	669	+2.5%
1890	589	−12.0%
1900	563	−4.4%
1910	609	+8.2%
1923	605	−0.7%
1934	576	−4.8%
1939	564	−2.1%
1951	594	+5.3%
1961	614	+3.4%
1971	659	+7.3%
1981	729	+10.6%
1991	711	−2.5%
2001	725	+2.0%
2011	776	+7.0%
