= Eggendorf, Lower Austria =

Eggendorf
- Municipality
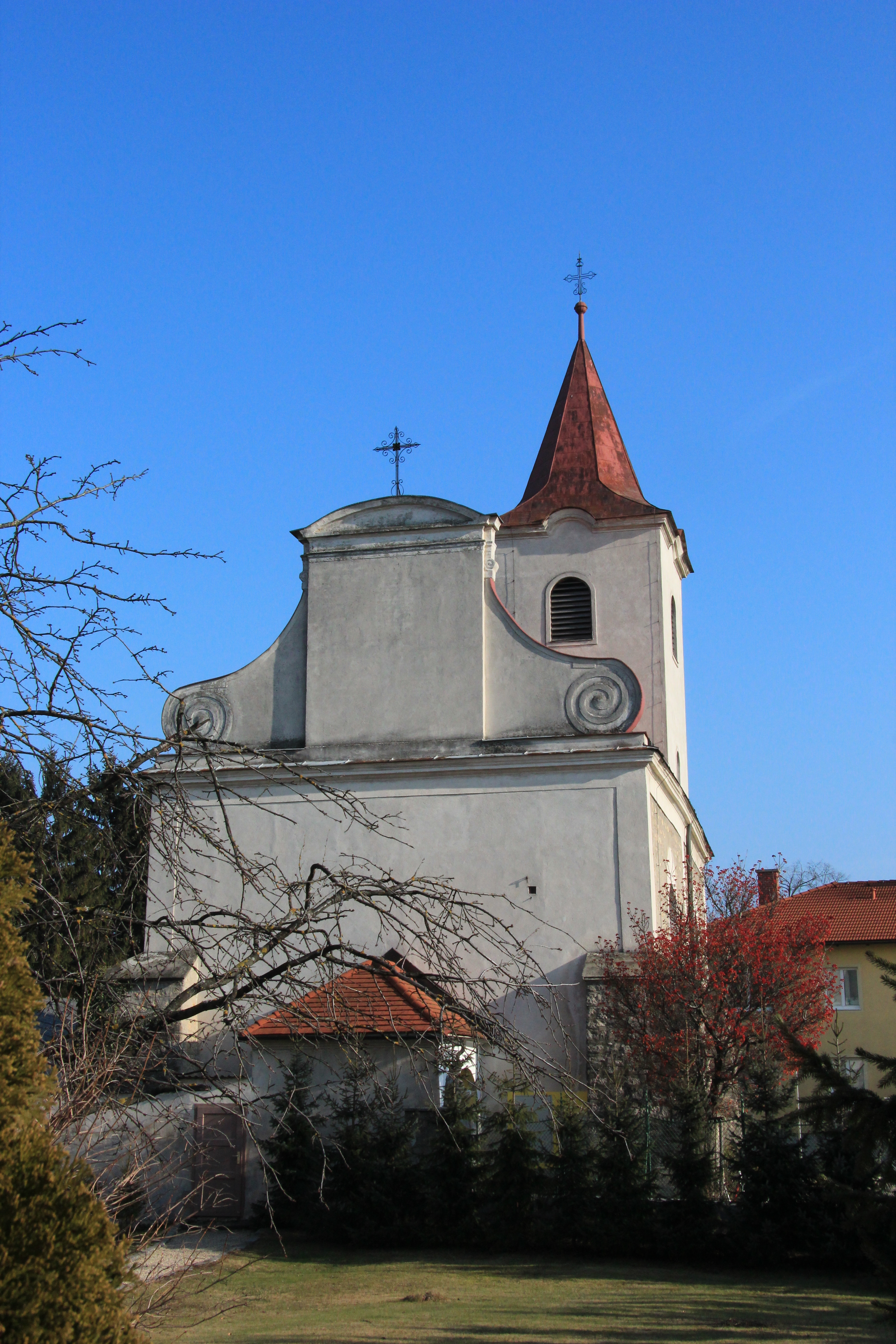
- Eggendorf parish church

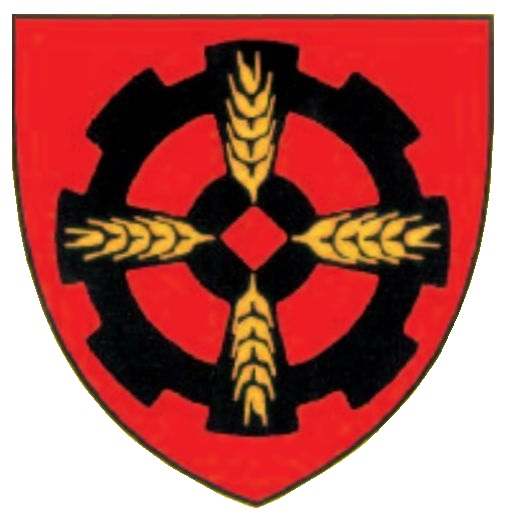
- Coat of arms

- Location within Austria
- Coordinates: 47°51′24″N 16°19′40″E
- Country: Austria
- State: Lower Austria
- District: Wiener Neustadt-Land

Government
  - Mayor: Thomas Pollak (SPMT)

Area
  - Total: 20.59 km^{2} (7.95 sq mi)
- Elevation: 241 m (791 ft)

Population (2018-01-01)
  - Total: 4,794
  - Density: 232.8/km^{2} (603.0/sq mi)
- Time zone: UTC+1 (CET)
  - Summer (DST): UTC+2 (CEST)
- Postal code: 2492
- Area code: 02622
- Vehicle registration: WB
- Website: www.eggendorf-noe.at

Eggendorf is a municipality in the Wiener Neustadt-Land District in the Austrian state of Lower Austria.

== Population ==
Historical population
Year	Pop.	±%
1869	1,020	—
1880	1,022	+0.2%
1890	1,142	+11.7%
1900	1,348	+18.0%
1910	1,875	+39.1%
1923	2,007	+7.0%
1934	1,753	−12.7%
1939	1,682	−4.1%
1951	1,549	−7.9%
1961	1,500	−3.2%
1971	1,791	+19.4%
1981	2,723	+52.0%
1991	3,459	+27.0%
2001	4,085	+18.1%
2011	4,454	+9.0%

== Sport ==
When motorcycle speedway came to an end at the Stadion Wiener Neustadt, a smaller venue was used near Eggendorf. The track known as the Speedway & Flattrack Arena Tritolis is located on the north side of the Tritolstraße (47°51′30″N 16°16′36″E).
