= Sollenau =

- Municipality
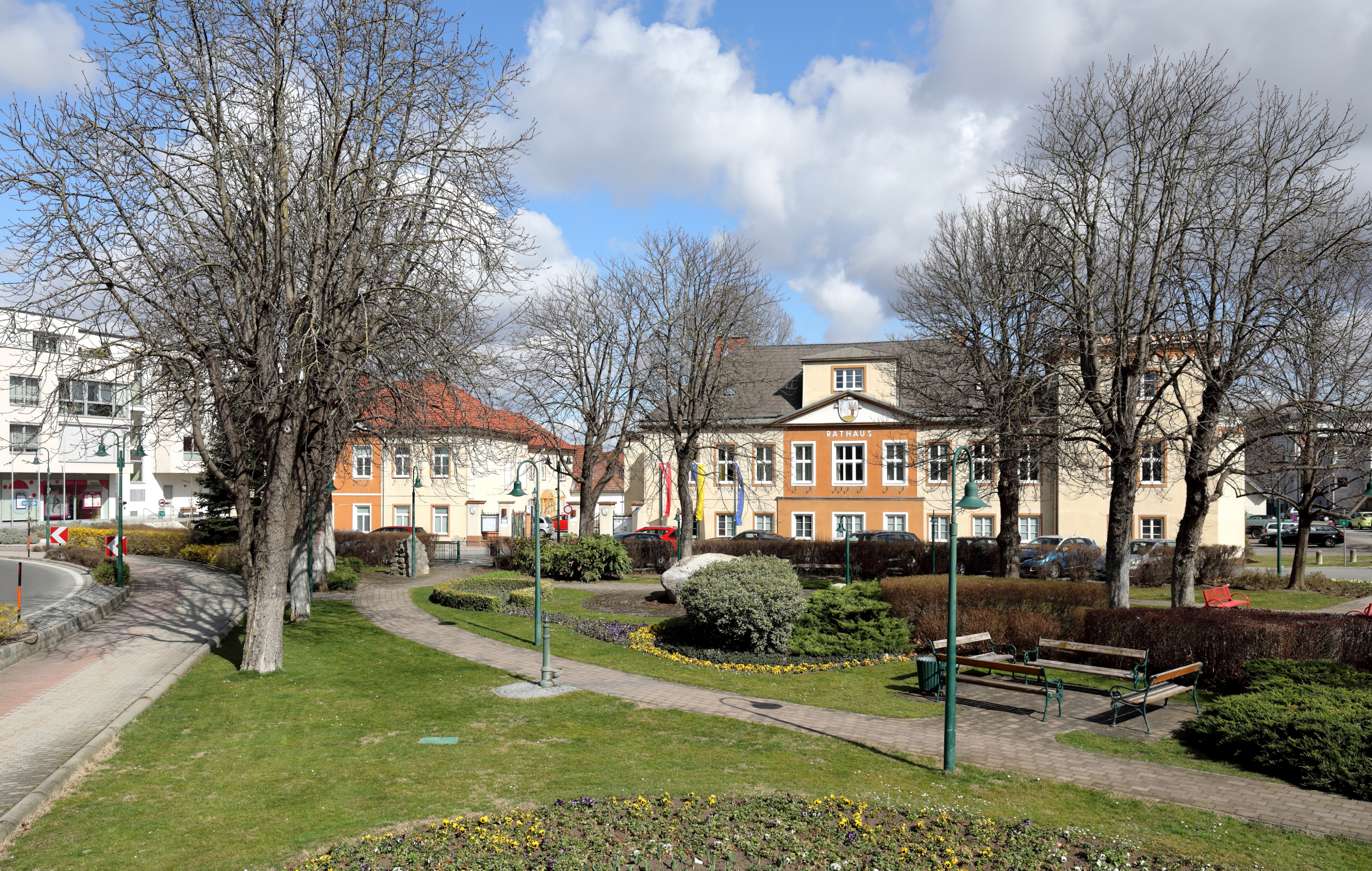
- Main square with park and town hall

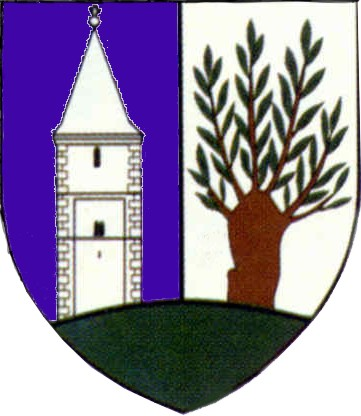
- Coat of arms

- Location within Austria
- Coordinates: 47°54′N 16°15′E
- Country: Austria
- State: Lower Austria
- District: Wiener Neustadt-Land

Government
  - Mayor: Stefan Wöckl (SPÖ)

Area
  - Total: 10.67 km^{2} (4.12 sq mi)
- Elevation: 277 m (909 ft)

Population (2026)
  - Total: 5,478
  - Density: 513.4/km^{2} (1,330/sq mi)
- Time zone: UTC+1 (CET)
  - Summer (DST): UTC+2 (CEST)
- Postal code: 2601
- Area code: 02628
- Vehicle registration: WB
- Website: www.sollenau.noe.gv.at

Sollenau is a municipality in the Wiener Neustadt-Land District, Lower Austria, Austria.

== Geography ==
Sollenau is situated on the river Piesting. 4.03% of the municipality is forested. It is 10 km north of Wiener Neustadt and 36 km south of Vienna.

== History ==
Sollenau was first mentioned in 1166. It is one of the oldest settlements in the Steinfeld region of Lower Austria.

== Demographics ==
Historical population
| Year | Pop. | ±% |
|---|---|---|
| 1971 | 2,781 | — |
| 1981 | 3,438 | +23.6% |
| 1991 | 4,213 | +22.5% |
| 2001 | 4,562 | +8.3% |
| 2011 | 4,736 | +3.8% |
| 2021 | 5,231 | +10.5% |
| 2026 | 5,478 | +4.7% |

== Politics ==
The municipal council (Gemeinderat) consists of 29 members. Following the 2025 Lower Austrian Local Elections, the seat distribution is as follows:

- Social Democratic Party of Austria (SPÖ): 16 seats
- Austrian People's Party (ÖVP): 9 seats
- Freedom Party of Austria (FPÖ): 4 seats

The mayor of Sollenau is Stefan Wöckl (SPÖ).

== Economy ==
In 2001 there were 191 non-agriculture-related jobs in the municipality, and 2,055 persons were employed. The activity rate was 45,92%. In 1999 there were 27 agricultural or forestry related companies.
