= Bad Fischau-Brunn =

- Municipality
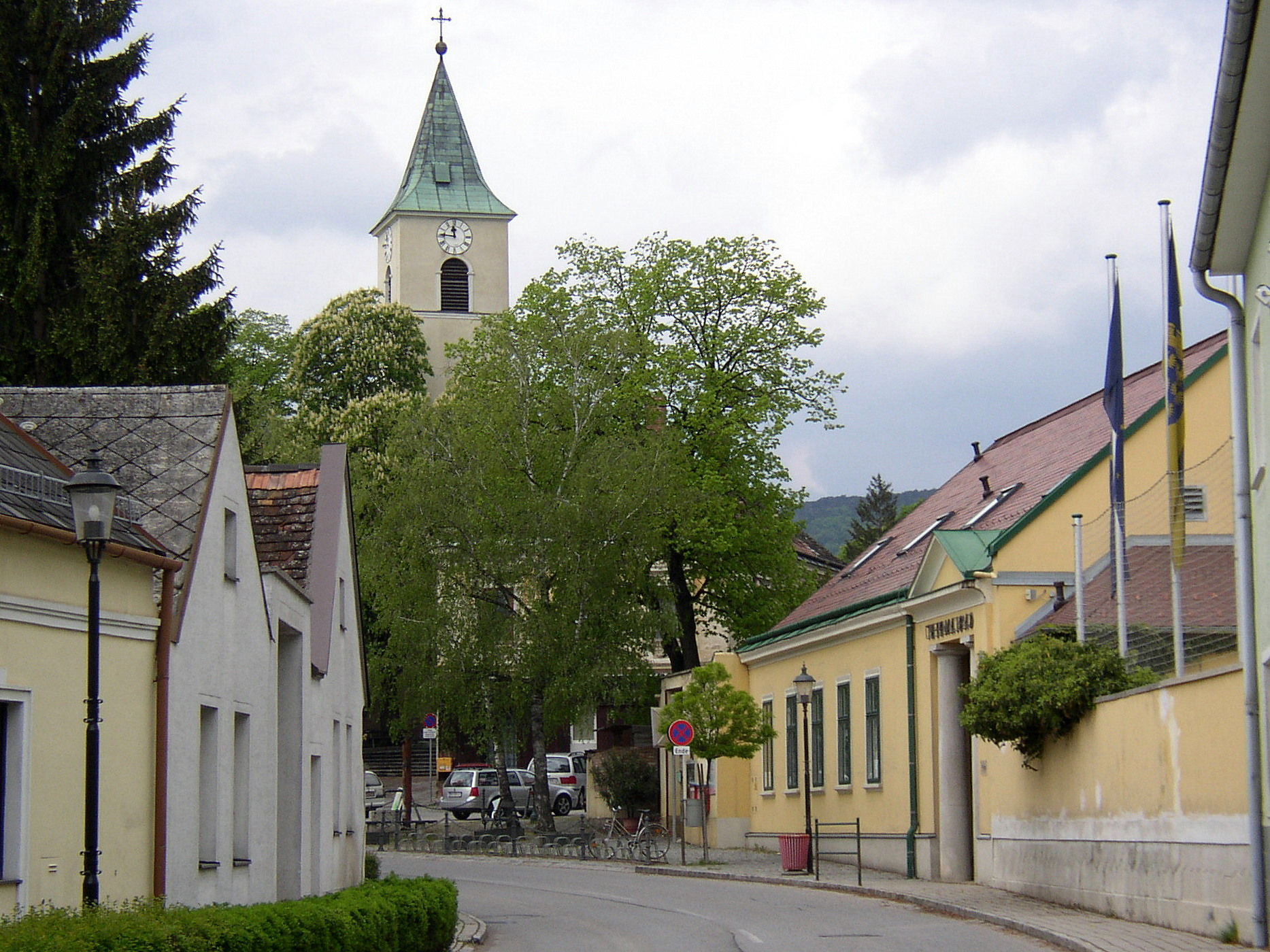
- Thermal spa and the church

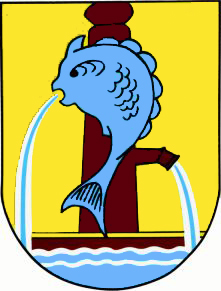
- Coat of arms

- Location within Austria
- Coordinates: 47°50′00″N 16°10′00″E
- Country: Austria
- State: Lower Austria
- District: Wiener Neustadt-Land

Government
  - Mayor: Reinhard Knobloch (ÖVP)

Area
  - Total: 20.59 km^{2} (7.95 sq mi)
- Elevation: 288 m (945 ft)

Population (2018-01-01)
  - Total: 3,440
  - Density: 167/km^{2} (433/sq mi)
- Time zone: UTC+1 (CET)
  - Summer (DST): UTC+2 (CEST)
- Postal code: 2721
- Area code: 02639
- Vehicle registration: WB
- Website: www.bad-fischau-brunn.at

The market town of Bad Fischau-Brunn is an Austrian municipality in the district of Wiener Neustadt-Land in Lower Austria. It is situated some 50 km south of Vienna at the edge of Viennese Basin.

Bad Fischau-Brunn is divided into two Katastralgemeinden:

- Bad Fischau
- Brunn an der Schneebergbahn.

== History ==
ASFINAG motorway restaurant of Hundertwasser in Bad Fischau

The oldest traces of settlement in the area of the municipality date back to the Hallstatt culture (8th-6th century BC). A Roman road passed through the area, and the sources of Fischau were already used in the Roman era. The name Fischau was first mentioned in the 9th century. It was mentioned as a market town in 1166, and was site of the mint, too. However, it lost its importance after Wiener Neustadt, founded at the end of the 12th century, became the site of the mint.

Exploitation of the mineral springs of Fischau took a rise in 1872, when the spa resort (Kristalltherme) was opened. It was rebuilt and expanded to its current state in 1900. The prefix "Bad" (spa town) has been added to the name in 1929. The current market town was formed in 1969 by merging the municipalities of Brunn an der Schneebergbahn and Bad-Fischau.

== Population ==
Historical population
Year	Pop.	±%
1869	1,315	—
1880	1,466	+11.5%
1890	1,496	+2.0%
1900	1,801	+20.4%
1910	1,909	+6.0%
1923	2,377	+24.5%
1934	2,024	−14.9%
1939	2,386	+17.9%
1951	2,182	−8.5%
1961	2,019	−7.5%
1971	2,133	+5.6%
1981	2,242	+5.1%
1991	2,502	+11.6%
2001	2,688	+7.4%
2011	2,997	+11.5%

== Culture and sites of interest ==
- The thermal springs (19 °C), dating from 1900 in its present form.
- The church, built in the 12th century, received its present classicist shape in 1796-1798.
- The castle
- The cave Eisensteinhöhle
