= Hohe Wand =

- Municipality
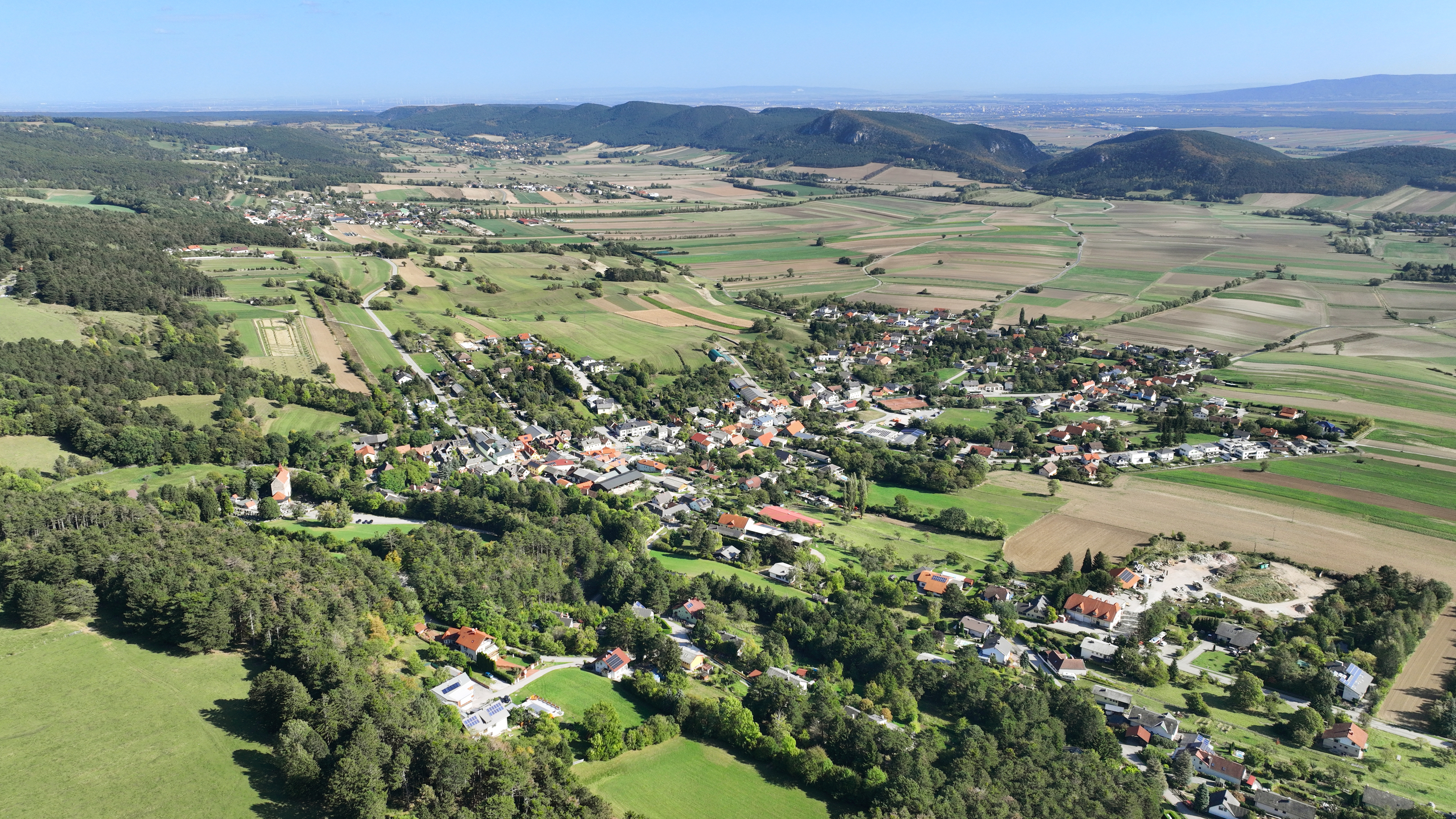

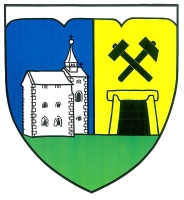
- Coat of arms

- Location within Austria
- Coordinates: 47°50′00″N 16°05′00″E
- Country: Austria
- State: Lower Austria
- District: Wiener Neustadt-Land

Government
  - Mayor: Josef Laferl (ÖVP)

Area
  - Total: 24.61 km^{2} (9.50 sq mi)
- Elevation: 450 m (1,480 ft)

Population (2018-01-01)
  - Total: 1,428
  - Density: 58.03/km^{2} (150.3/sq mi)
- Time zone: UTC+1 (CET)
  - Summer (DST): UTC+2 (CEST)
- Postal code: 2724
- Area code: 02638
- Vehicle registration: WB
- Website: www.hohewand.net

Hohe Wand is a municipality in the district of Wiener Neustadt-Land in the Austrian state of Lower Austria. In this municipality there are four villages: Stollhof, Maiersdorf, Gaaden, and Netting.

== Population ==
Historical population
Year	Pop.	±%
1869	1,094	—
1880	1,018	−6.9%
1890	942	−7.5%
1900	1,007	+6.9%
1910	1,047	+4.0%
1923	1,074	+2.6%
1934	1,064	−0.9%
1939	1,063	−0.1%
1951	1,127	+6.0%
1961	1,163	+3.2%
1971	1,236	+6.3%
1981	1,171	−5.3%
1991	1,276	+9.0%
2001	1,332	+4.4%
2011	1,420	+6.6%
