= Matzendorf-Hölles =

Municipality in Austria

- Municipality
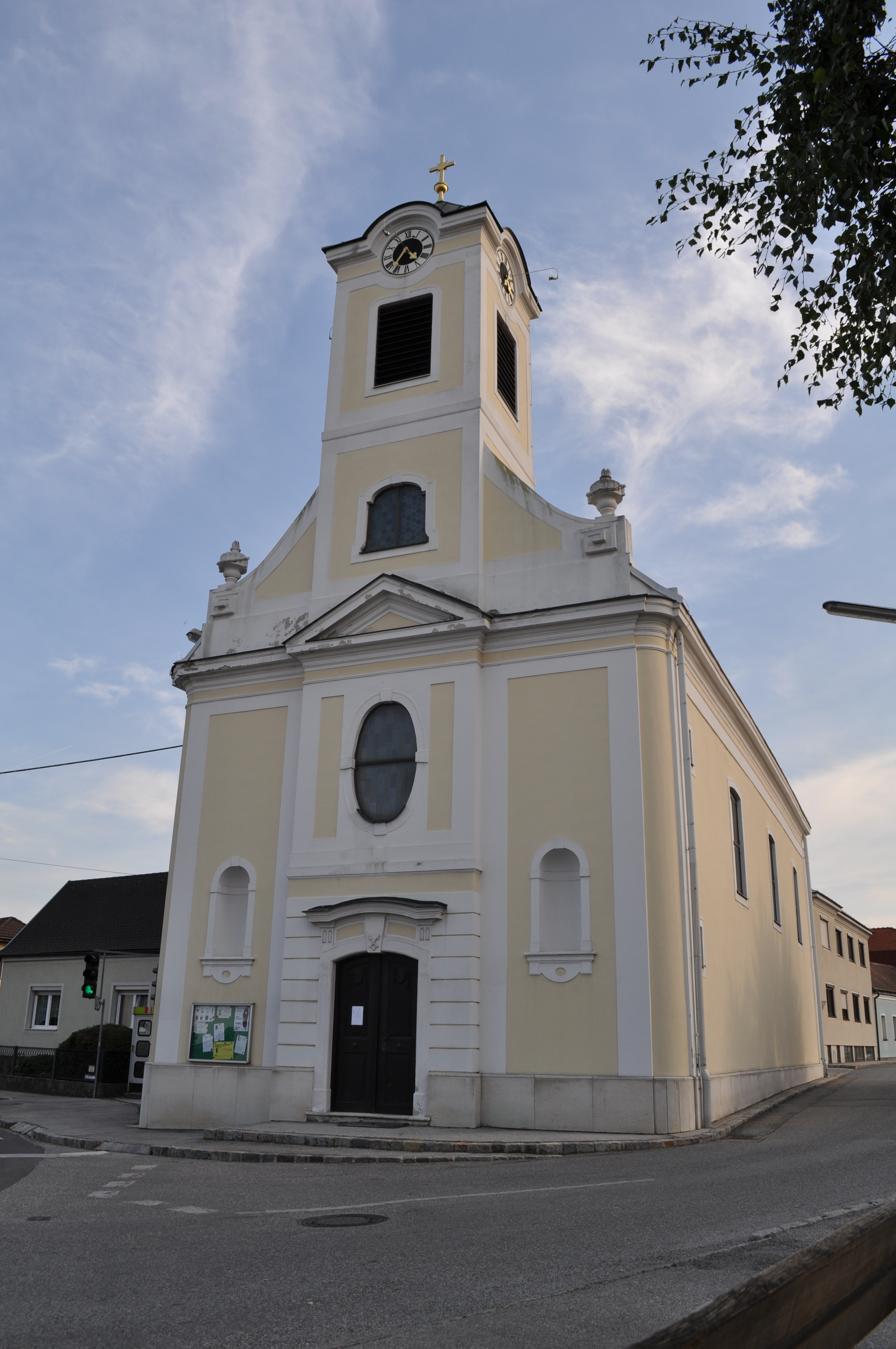
- Matzendorf parish church

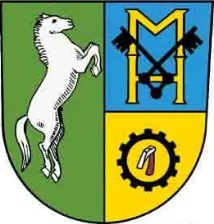
- Coat of arms

- Location within Austria
- Coordinates: 47°53′00″N 16°13′00″E
- Country: Austria
- State: Lower Austria
- District: Wiener Neustadt-Land

Government
  - Mayor: Johann Grund (ÖVP)

Area
  - Total: 14.07 km^{2} (5.43 sq mi)
- Elevation: 287 m (942 ft)

Population (2018-01-01)
  - Total: 2,040
  - Density: 145/km^{2} (376/sq mi)
- Time zone: UTC+1 (CET)
  - Summer (DST): UTC+2 (CEST)
- Postal code: 2751, 2603
- Area code: 02628
- Vehicle registration: WB
- Website: www.matzendorf.at

Matzendorf-Hölles is a municipality in the district of Wiener Neustadt-Land in the Austrian state of Lower Austria.

== Population ==
Historical population
| Year | Pop. | ±% |
|---|---|---|
| 1869 | 516 | — |
| 1880 | 542 | +5.0% |
| 1890 | 615 | +13.5% |
| 1900 | 583 | −5.2% |
| 1910 | 803 | +37.7% |
| 1923 | 732 | −8.8% |
| 1934 | 677 | −7.5% |
| 1939 | 734 | +8.4% |
| 1951 | 683 | −6.9% |
| 1961 | 680 | −0.4% |
| 1971 | 720 | +5.9% |
| 1981 | 1,012 | +40.6% |
| 1991 | 1,356 | +34.0% |
| 2001 | 1,731 | +27.7% |
| 2011 | 1,894 | +9.4% |
