= Wiener Neustadt District =

Coordinates: 47°37′21″N 16°20′27″E

Wiener Neustadt District Bezirk Wiener Neustadt
- District
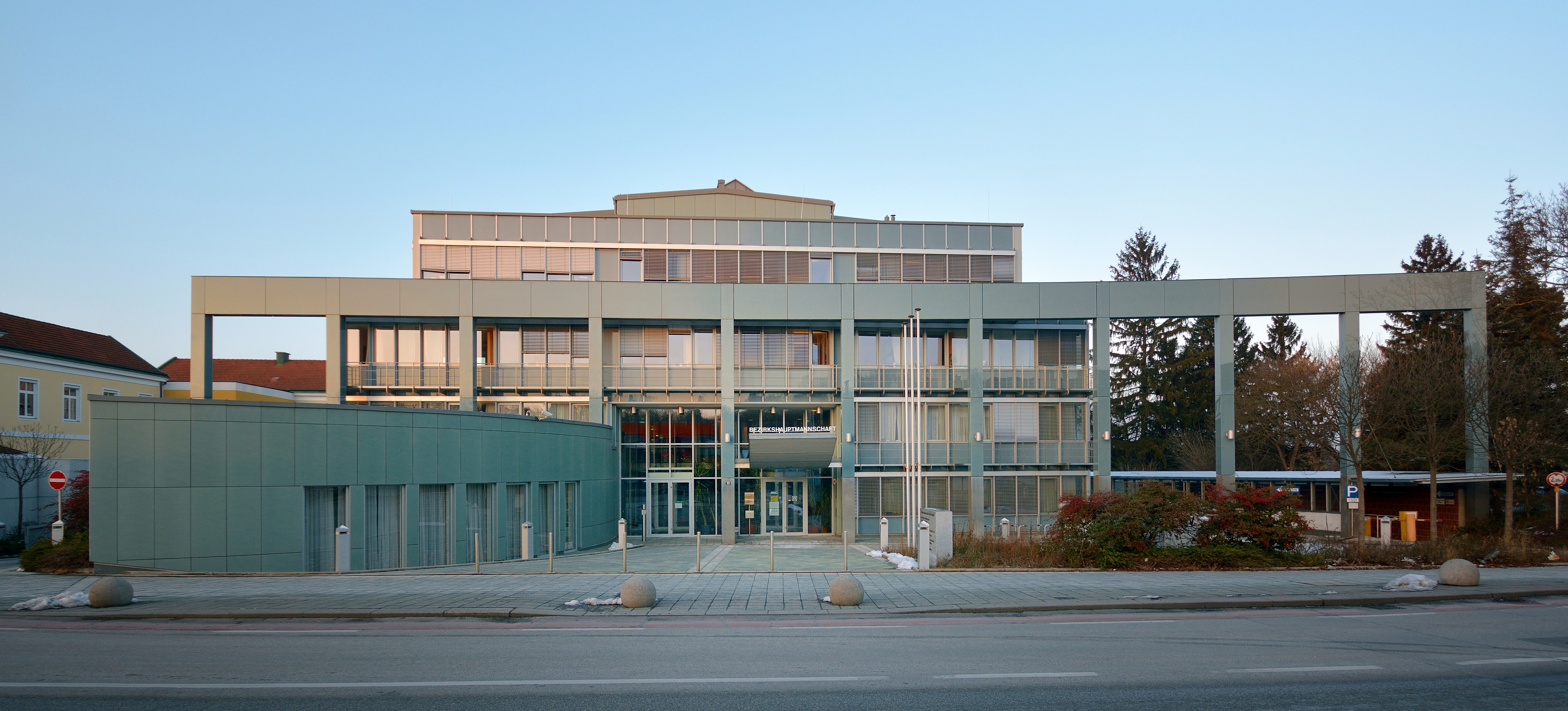
- District commission building of Wiener Neustadt
- Country: Austria
- State: Lower Austria
- Number of municipalities: 35
- Administrative seat: Wiener Neustadt

Government
  - District Governor: Markus Sauer (since 2018)

Area
  - Total: 969.7 km^{2} (374.4 sq mi)

Population (2024)
  - Total: 80,854
  - Density: 83.38/km^{2} (216.0/sq mi)
- Time zone: UTC+01:00 (CET)
  - Summer (DST): UTC+02:00 (CEST)
- Vehicle registration: WB
- NUTS code: AT122
- District code: 323

Bezirk Wiener Neustadt is a district of the state of Lower Austria in Austria.

== Municipalities ==
Suburbs, hamlets and other subdivisions of a municipality are indicated in small characters.

- Bad Erlach
  - Brunn bei Pitten, Erlach, Linsberg
- Bad Fischau-Brunn
  - Bad Fischau, Brunn an der Schneebergbahn
- Bad Schönau
  - Almen, Bad Schönau, Leitenviertel, Maierhöfen, Schlägen, Schützenkasten, Wenigreith
- Bromberg
  - Breitenbuch, Bromberg, Schlag, Schlag, Schlatten
- Ebenfurth
  - Ebenfurth, Großmittel, Haschendorf
- Eggendorf
- Felixdorf
- Gutenstein
  - Gutenstein, Hintergschaid, Klostertal, Längapiesting, Steinapiesting, Urgersbach, Vorderbruck, Zellenbach
- Hochneukirchen-Gschaidt
  - Burgerschlag, Grametschlag, Gschaidt, Harmannsdorf, Hattmannsdorf, Hochneukirchen, Kirchschlagl, Loipersdorf, Maltern, Offenegg, Ulrichsdorf, Züggen
- Hochwolkersdorf
  - Hackbichl, Hochwolkersdorf-Dorf, Hochwolkersdorf-Zerstreut, Rosenbrunn
- Hohe Wand
  - Gaaden, Maiersdorf, Netting, Stollhof
- Hollenthon
  - Blumau, Gleichenbach, Grohdorf, Hollenthon, Horndorf, Lehen, Michelbach, Mittereck, Obereck, Pürahöfen, Spratzau, Spratzeck, Stickelberg, Untereck
- Katzelsdorf
- Kirchschlag in der Buckligen Welt
  - Aigen, Kirchschlag in der Buckligen Welt, Lembach, Stang, Straß, Thomasdorf, Ungerbach
- Krumbach
  - Krumbach-Amt, Krumbach-Markt
- Lanzenkirchen
  - Frohsdorf, Haderswörth, Kleinwolkersdorf, Lanzenkirchen, Ofenbach
- Lichtenegg
  - Amlos, Feichten, Kaltenberg, Kühbach, Lichtenegg, Maierhöfen, Pengersdorf, Pesendorf, Pregart, Pregart, Pürahöfen, Purgstall, Ransdorf, Schlagergraben, Spratzau, Tafern, Thal, Tiefenbach, Wäschau, Wieden, Winkl
- Lichtenwörth
- Markt Piesting
  - Dreistetten, Markt Piesting
- Matzendorf-Hölles
  - Hölles, Matzendorf
- Miesenbach
- Muggendorf
  - Kreuth, Muggendorf, Thal
- Pernitz
  - Feichtenbach, Pernitz
- Rohr im Gebirge
- Schwarzenbach
  - Schwarzenbach, Schwarzenbach-Zerstreut
- Sollenau
- Theresienfeld
- Waidmannsfeld
  - Neusiedl, Schallhof, Waidmannsfeld
- Waldegg
  - Dürnbach, Ober-Piesting, Oed, Peisching, Reichental, Waldegg, Wopfing
- Walpersbach
  - Klingfurth, Schleinz, Schleinz, Walpersbach
- Weikersdorf am Steinfelde
- Wiesmath
- Winzendorf-Muthmannsdorf
  - Emmerberg, Muthmannsdorf, Winzendorf
- Wöllersdorf-Steinabrückl
  - Steinabrückl, Wöllersdorf
- Zillingdorf
  - Zillingdorf, Zillingdorf-Bergwerk
