= Zillingdorf =

- Municipality
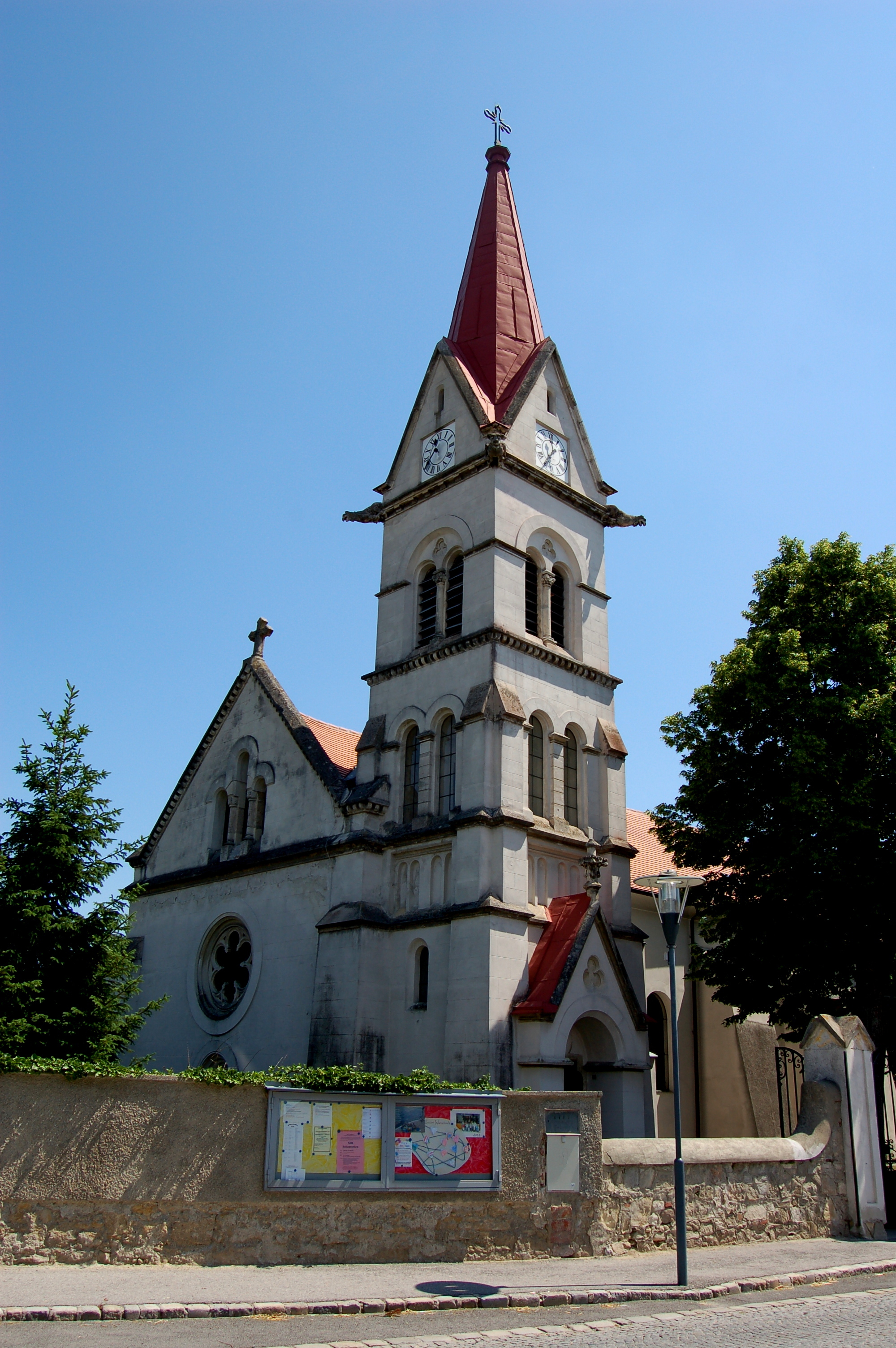
- Zillingdorf parish church

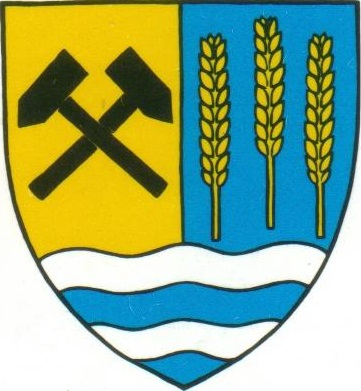
- Coat of arms

- Location within Austria
- Coordinates: 47°51′00″N 16°20′00″E
- Country: Austria
- State: Lower Austria
- District: Wiener Neustadt-Land

Government
  - Mayor: Harald Hahn (ZZ)

Area
  - Total: 15.34 km^{2} (5.92 sq mi)
- Elevation: 241 m (791 ft)

Population (2018-01-01)
  - Total: 2,030
  - Density: 132/km^{2} (343/sq mi)
- Time zone: UTC+1 (CET)
  - Summer (DST): UTC+2 (CEST)
- Postal code: 2492
- Area code: 02622
- Vehicle registration: WB
- Website: www.zillingdorf.at

Zillingdorf is a municipality in the district of Wiener Neustadt-Land in the Austrian state of Lower Austria.

== Population ==
Historical population
Year	Pop.	±%
1869	846	—
1880	952	+12.5%
1890	946	−0.6%
1900	1,034	+9.3%
1910	1,129	+9.2%
1923	1,666	+47.6%
1934	1,993	+19.6%
1939	1,775	−10.9%
1951	1,680	−5.4%
1961	1,616	−3.8%
1971	1,653	+2.3%
1981	1,543	−6.7%
1991	1,522	−1.4%
2001	1,750	+15.0%
2011	1,997	+14.1%
2026	2,100	+5.2%
