= Waldegg, Lower Austria =

Waldegg
- Municipality
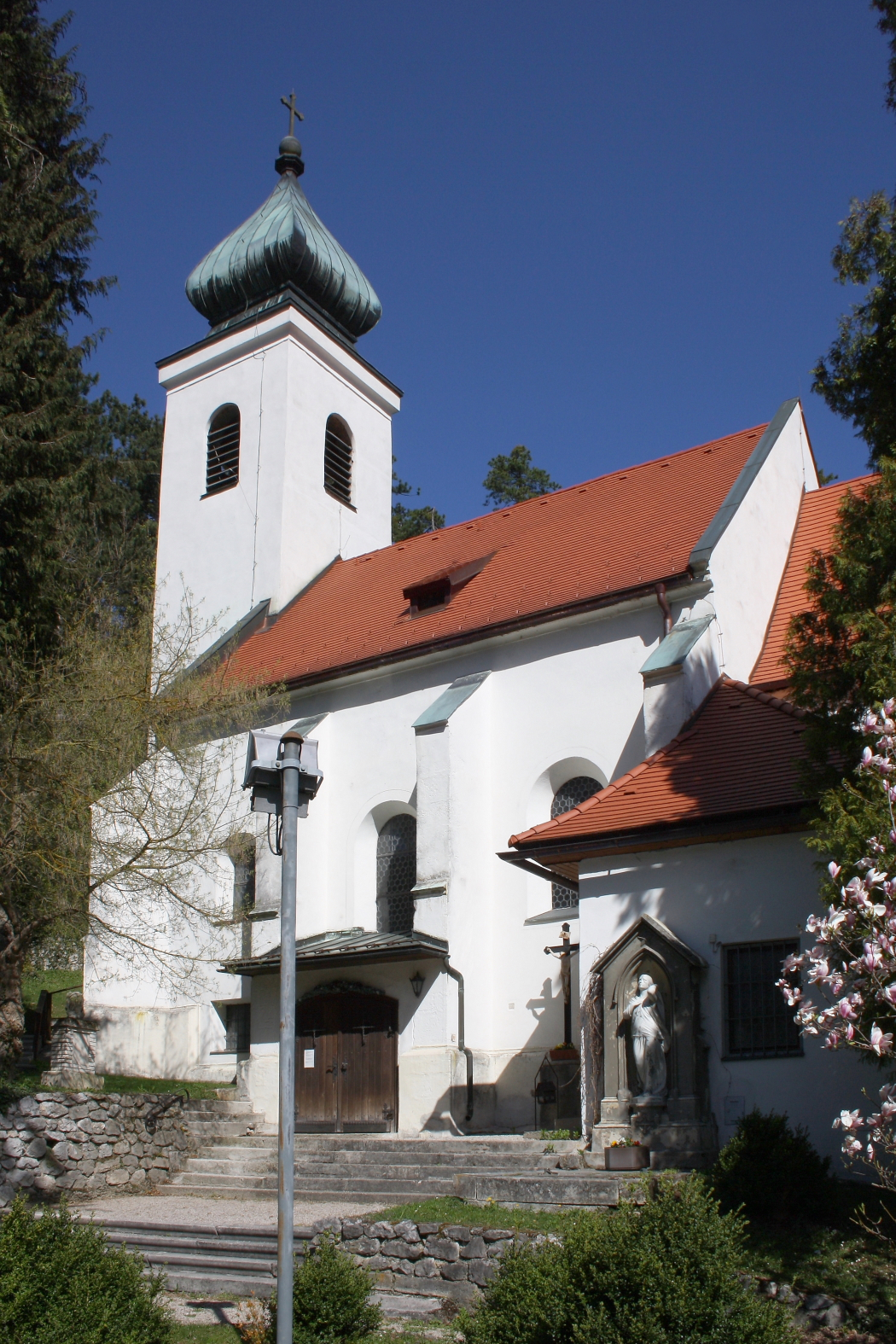
- Waldegg parish church

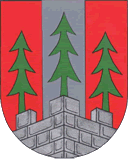
- Coat of arms

- Location within Austria
- Coordinates: 47°52′00″N 16°02′00″E
- Country: Austria
- State: Lower Austria
- District: Wiener Neustadt-Land

Government
  - Mayor: Johann Klesl (SPÖ)

Area
  - Total: 35.72 km^{2} (13.79 sq mi)
- Elevation: 402 m (1,319 ft)

Population (2018-01-01)
  - Total: 2,048
  - Density: 57.33/km^{2} (148.5/sq mi)
- Time zone: UTC+1 (CET)
  - Summer (DST): UTC+2 (CEST)
- Postal code: 2754
- Area code: 02633
- Vehicle registration: WB
- Website: www.waldegg.co.at

Waldegg is a municipality in the district of Wiener Neustadt-Land in the Austrian state of Lower Austria.

== Population ==
Historical population
Year	Pop.	±%
1869	2,054	—
1880	2,197	+7.0%
1890	2,353	+7.1%
1900	2,613	+11.0%
1910	2,435	−6.8%
1923	2,674	+9.8%
1934	2,280	−14.7%
1939	2,188	−4.0%
1951	2,215	+1.2%
1961	2,134	−3.7%
1971	2,105	−1.4%
1981	2,010	−4.5%
1991	2,021	+0.5%
2001	2,062	+2.0%
2011	2,014	−2.3%
