= Industrieviertel =

Subdivision of the region of Lower Austria

Coordinates: 47.8333°N 16.3333°E

Industrieviertel (German: [ɪndʊsˈtʁiːˌfɪʁtl̩]; English: 'Industrial Quarter'; or Viertel unter dem Wienerwald (German: [ˈfɪʁtl̩ ʊntɐ deːm ˈviːnɐvalt]), is the southeastern quarter of the four quarters of Lower Austria (the northeast state of the 9 states in Austria). It is bordered on the north by Vienna and the Weinviertel, to the west by the Mostviertel, and to the south and east by the states of Styria and Burgenland respectively. The Vienna Woods (Wienerwald) forms the natural border to the west, and hence the alternate name as "Quarter below the Wienerwald".

Since the formation of the political districts in 1868, the quarters in Lower Austria no longer have a legal basis and are purely landscape names. Today the industrial Quarter is represented by the districts Vienna Woods (Wienerwald) and the Vienna Alps (Wiener-Alpen).

== Districts ==
The Industrieviertel is made up of the following districts:

Lower Austria (northeast) shown in Austria.

- Baden
- Bruck an der Leitha
- Mödling
- Neunkirchen
- Wiener Neustadt
- Wiener Neustadt-Land
- Wien-Umgebung

== Landscape ==
Geographically, the Industrieviertel is characterized by the level of the stone field, with its brown earth soils on tertiary molasse, just as the Vienna Basin rests on Chernozem soils. The landscape in the area of the Vienna Basin is composed of vast agricultural areas, industrial areas and vineyards along the Thermenlinie ("thermal line") geological fault line of thermal springs. In the stone field, on brown earth soils, are vast pine forests which had been created under Empress Maria Theresa, to prevent the desertification of the arid landscape. On the slopes of the Wienerwald, different forest types have grown, depending on the climatic conditions. In the east, the view extends to the horizon, the so-called "gates" that Wienerneustadt gate, which Brucker Hainburger gate and gate to separate the Rosaliengebirge and Leitha Mountains, the Hundsheim and the Little Carpathian Mountains. Simultaneously, with the installation of the pine woods, have been used for rosin production during 1761–1765, straight on the road between the towns of Wiener Neustadt and Neunkirchen, the so-called Neunkirchner Avenue, started by Joseph Liesganig with the geodetic surveying of the entire monarchy at that time.

== Climate ==
The annual mean temperature range, depending on the location, is from 11 °C (52 °F) to 4 °C (39 °F). For example, for Wiener Neustadt (280 metres or 920 feet), the annual mean temperature is around 10.3 °C (50.5 °F), with approximately 630 millimetres (25 in) of precipitation, and snow cover nearly 40 days, about 95 days of frost and sunshine around 1900 hours, in contrast to Semmering with an annual average of about 5.5 °C (41.9 °F), a rainfall of about 970 millimetres (38 in), a snow cover of about 150 days, plus about 150 frost days and approximately 1500 hours of sunshine.

== Economy ==
The name Industrieviertel stems from the industrial area of early industrialisation, which was already the focus of the economy in the Vienna Woods region in 1783. Because of its favorable location factors, such as proximity to raw material collected from wood, iron and coal, and hydroelectric energy sources, and wood, plus the sales-market of the nearby city of Vienna, industries increased here.

The industrial district was severely affected by the two world wars. After the Second World War, the Industrieviertel was part of the Soviet zone of occupation. Thus, the Soviets confiscated belongings of the USIA holdings company and uninstalled some machinery and entire plants completely, in order to reassemble them in the Soviet Union. There are, however, still a number of industries located here. Especially along the Thermenlinie (thermal fault line), after 1955, many small and large industrial centers were built as the industrial center south of Lower Eco Plus. Establishments in the city of Vienna were among the first that moved into this area. Mödling, although the smallest district in the state, has the highest tax base in Austria.

The size of the Industrieviertel is 4,186 square kilometres (1,616 sq mi), or 21.8% of the area of Lower Austria, as a permanent settlement. However, there are only 2,008 square kilometres (775 sq mi) available for permanent settlement, which is 48% of the total area of the Industrieviertel.
