= List of caves in Austria =

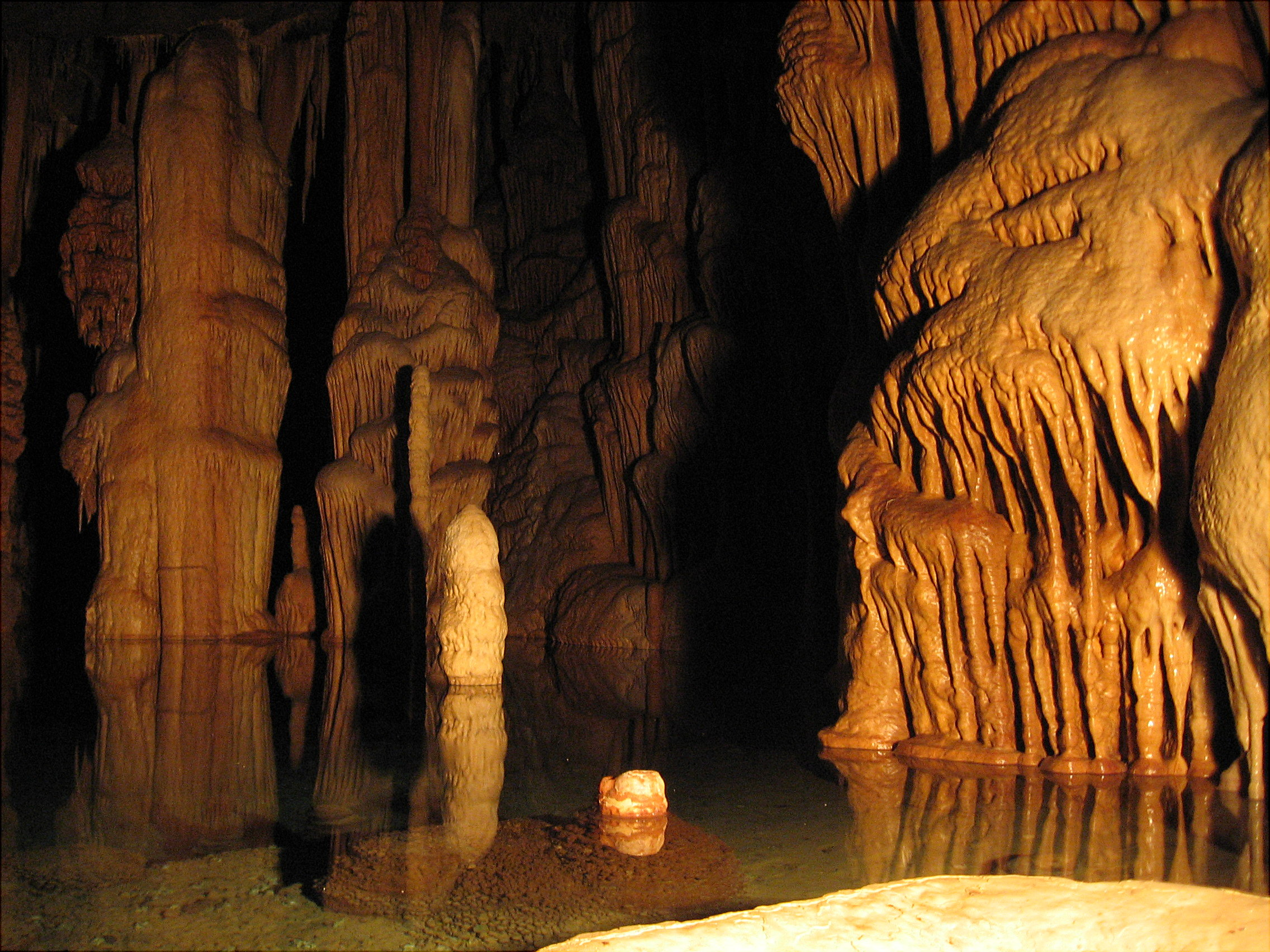
View of the Katerloch Cave

The following article shows a list of caves in Austria. The list also includes ice caves and tourist former salt caves (Salzwelten).

== Overview ==
The main concentration of Austrian caves (German: Höhle) is in the Northern Limestone Alps, a mountain range of the Eastern Alps. Many of them are located in the geographical region of Salzkammergut and in the Totes Gebirge.

== Caves ==
The caves are listed by alphabetical order and there are shown the main tourist caves and other notable (ex.: archaeological or paleontological) underground voids. In the "length" section is shown, between parentheses, the cave's trail as a show cave (SC).

Image	Name	Municipality	State	Length	Elevation	Coordinates
	Allander Tropfsteinhöhle	Alland (BN)	Lower Austria	0.07 km (SC: 0.07 km)	410 amsl	48°03′12″N 16°04′33″E
	Dachstein-Mammuthöhle	Obertraun (GM)	Upper Austria	66 km (SC: 1 km)	1,368 amsl	47°30′10″N 13°11′23″E
	Dachstein-Rieseneishöhle	Obertraun (GM)	Upper Austria	2 km (SC: 1 km)	1,455 amsl	47°32′54″N 13°42′17″E
	DÖF-Sonnleiter	Tauplitz (LI)	Styria	21.4 km (SC: no)	1,996 amsl	47°36′00″N 13°02′00″E
	Einhornhöhle (Note: Translated as Unicorn cave)	Markt Piesting (Note: In the civil parish (Ortsteil) of Dreistetten) (WB)	Lower Austria	0.6 (SC: 0.6 km)	585 amsl	47°51′27″N 16°05′23″E
	Eisensteinhöhle	Bad Fischau-Brunn (WB)	Lower Austria	2 km (SC: 1 km)	380 amsl	47°49′51″N 16°08′36″E
	Eiskogelhöhle	Werfenweng (JO)	Salzburg	2 km (SC: 0.5 km)	2,100 amsl	47°29′42″N 13°17′22″E
	Eisriesenwelt	Werfen (JO)	Salzburg	42 km (SC: 1 km)	1,656 amsl	47°30′10″N 13°11′23″E
	Entrische Kirche	Goldegg (JO)	Salzburg	2.5 km (SC: 1 km)	1,040 amsl	47°16′45″N 13°05′04″E
	Gasselhöhle	Ebensee (Note: Entrance situated in Erlakogel mountain) (GM)	Upper Austria	3.7 km (SC: 0.6 km)	1,229 amsl	47°49′23″N 13°50′34″E
	Grasslhöhle	Naas (WZ)	Styria	1.5 km (SC: 0.6 km)	720 amsl	47°14′42″N 15°32′59″E
	Griffener Tropfsteinhöhle	Griffen (VK)	Carinthia	0.5 km (SC: 0.5 km)	485 amsl	46°42′14″N 14°43′47″E
	Hermannshöhle	Kirchberg am Wechsel (NK)	Lower Austria	4.2 km (SC: 0.6 km)	660 amsl	47°31′01″N 15°58′56″E
	Hochkarschacht	Göstling an der Ybbs (Note: Entrance situated in Hochkar mountain) (SB)	Lower Austria	0.7 km (SC: 0.7 km)	1,620 amsl	47°31′01″N 14°54′54″E
	Hundalm-Eishöhle	Mariastein (Note: In the civil parish (Ortsteil) of Hundalm) (KU)	Tyrol	2 km (SC: 1 km)	1,520 amsl	47°32′42″N 12°01′45″E
	Katerloch	Naas (Note: In the civil parish (Ortsteil) of Dürntal) (WZ)	Styria	1 km (SC: 1 km)	900 amsl	47°15′10″N 15°32′59″E
	Kolkbläser-Monsterhöhle-System	Saalfelden (ZE)	Salzburg	44.5 km (SC: no)	1,400 amsl	47°28′15″N 12°55′03″E
	Kraushöhle	Gams bei Hieflau (LI)	Styria	0.3 km (SC: 0.3 km)	600 amsl	47°40′04″N 14°48′14″E
	Koppenbrüllerhöhle	Obertraun (GM)	Upper Austria	3.9 km (SC: 0.5 km)	580 amsl	47°34′01″N 13°42′49″E
	Lamprechtsofen	Weißbach (Note: Entrance situated in Leoganger Steinberge) (ZE)	Salzburg	51 km (SC: 0.7 km)	660 amsl	47°31′34″N 12°44′21″E
	Lurgrotte	Peggau (GU); Semriach (GU)	Styria	5 km (SC: 2 km)	640 amsl	47°13′37″N 15°22′46″E
	Nixhöhle	Frankenfels (PL)	Lower Austria	1.4 km (SC: 0.3 km)	556 amsl	47°58′28″N 15°18′31″E
	Obir-Tropfsteinhöhlen	Eisenkappel-Vellach (Note: Entrance situated in Hochobir mountain) (VK)	Carinthia	6 km (SC: 1 km)	1,100 amsl	46°30′34″N 14°32′54″E
	Odelsteinhöhle	Johnsbach (Note: Entrance situated in the Ennstaler Alps) (LI)	Styria	0.6 km (SC: 0.4 km)	1,085 amsl	47°31′27″N 14°36′43″E
	Ötscher-Tropfsteinhöhle	Gaming (Note: Situated in Ötscher-Tormäuer natural park) (SB)	Lower Austria	0.5 km (SC: 0.5 km)	750 amsl	47°54′36″N 15°11′23″E
	Rettenwandhöhle	Thörl (BM)	Styria	0.6 km (SC: 0.6 km)	630 amsl	47°28′05″N 15°15′08″E
	Salzofen	Grundlsee (LI)	Styria	2 km (SC: no)	1,850 amsl	47°41′21″N 13°49′36″E
	Salzwelten Altaussee	Altaussee (LI)	Styria	1 km (SC: 1 km)	960 amsl	47°39′05″N 13°46′58″E
	Salzwelten Hallein	Hallein (Note: In the civil parish (Ortsteil) of Dürrnberg) (HA)	Salzburg	1 km (SC: 1 km)	650 amsl	47°40′2″N 13°05′25″E
	Salzwelten Hallstatt	Hallstatt (GM)	Upper Austria	1 km (SC: 1 km)	860 amsl	47°33′44″N 13°38′24″E
	Schönberg	Bad Ischl (GM); Altaussee (LI)	Upper Austria; Styria	156 km (SC: no)	1,060 amsl	47°42′06″N 13°46′20″E
	Spannagelhöhle	Tux (SZ)	Tyrol	10 km (SC: 0.5 km)	2,521 amsl	47°04′49″N 11°40′18″E
	Schwarzmooskogel-Höhlensystem	Altaussee (Note: Entrance situated in Loser Plateau) (LI)	Styria	138 km (SC: no)	1,877 amsl	47°41′27″N 13°49′17″E

== See also ==
- List of caves
- Simplified list for Austria
- Speleology
- Underground mines in Austria
