= Zellerrain Pass =

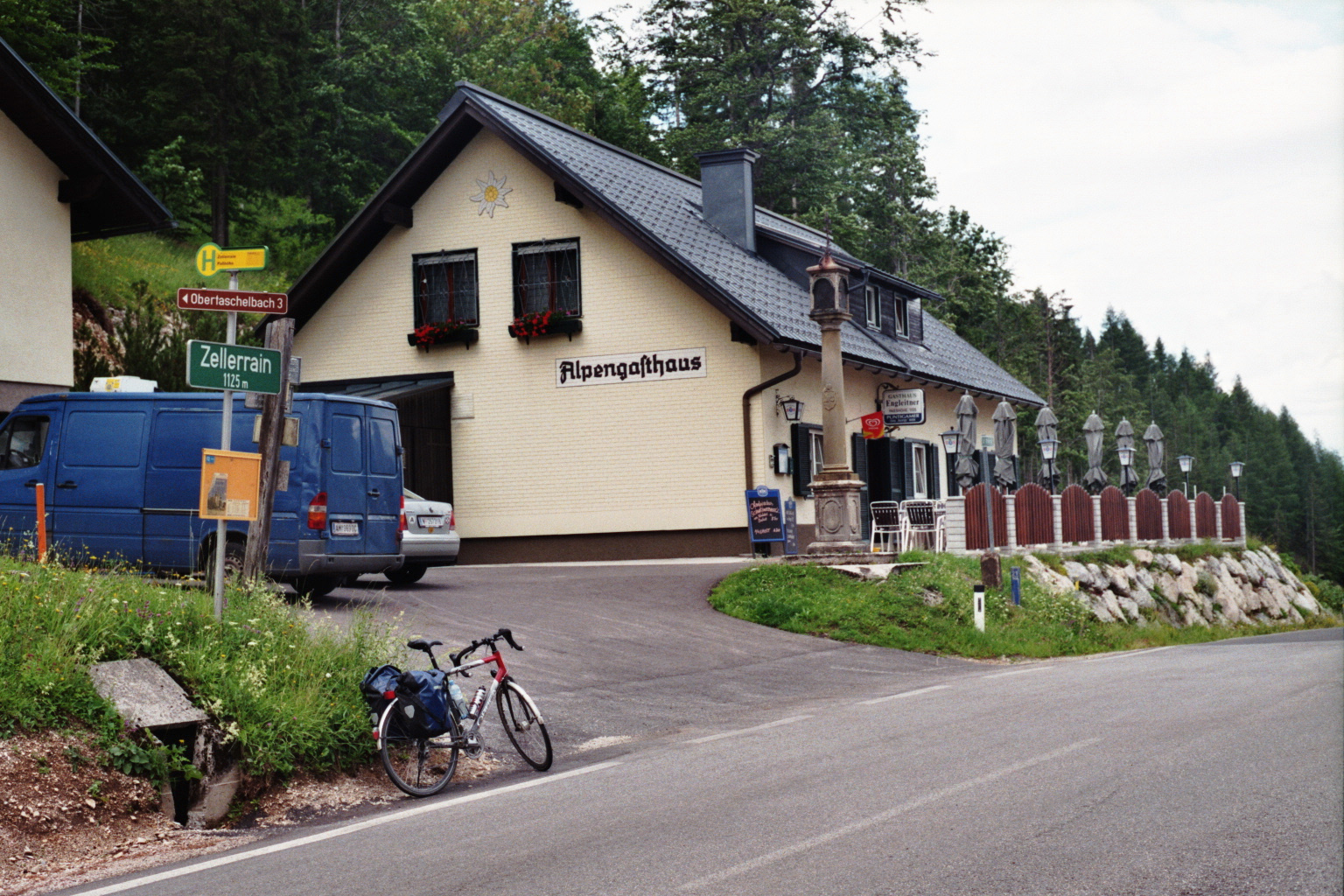
- Zellerrain pass near Mariazell, with the Alpengasthaus and the Kartäusersäule column

- Location within Austria
- Elevation: 1,125 metres (3,691 ft)

Third Approach
- Location: Austria
- Range: Ybbstal Alps
- Coordinates: 47°47′30″N 15°12′55″E

Zellerrain Pass (elevation 1,125 m, 3,691 ft) is a mountain pass in the Ybbstal Alps, located on border between Lower Austria and Styria, west of Mariazell. The pass road has a steep grade of up to 22 percent. The river Ybbs has its source at the pass.

== See also ==
- List of highest paved roads in Europe
- List of mountain passes
