= Northern Styrian Alps =

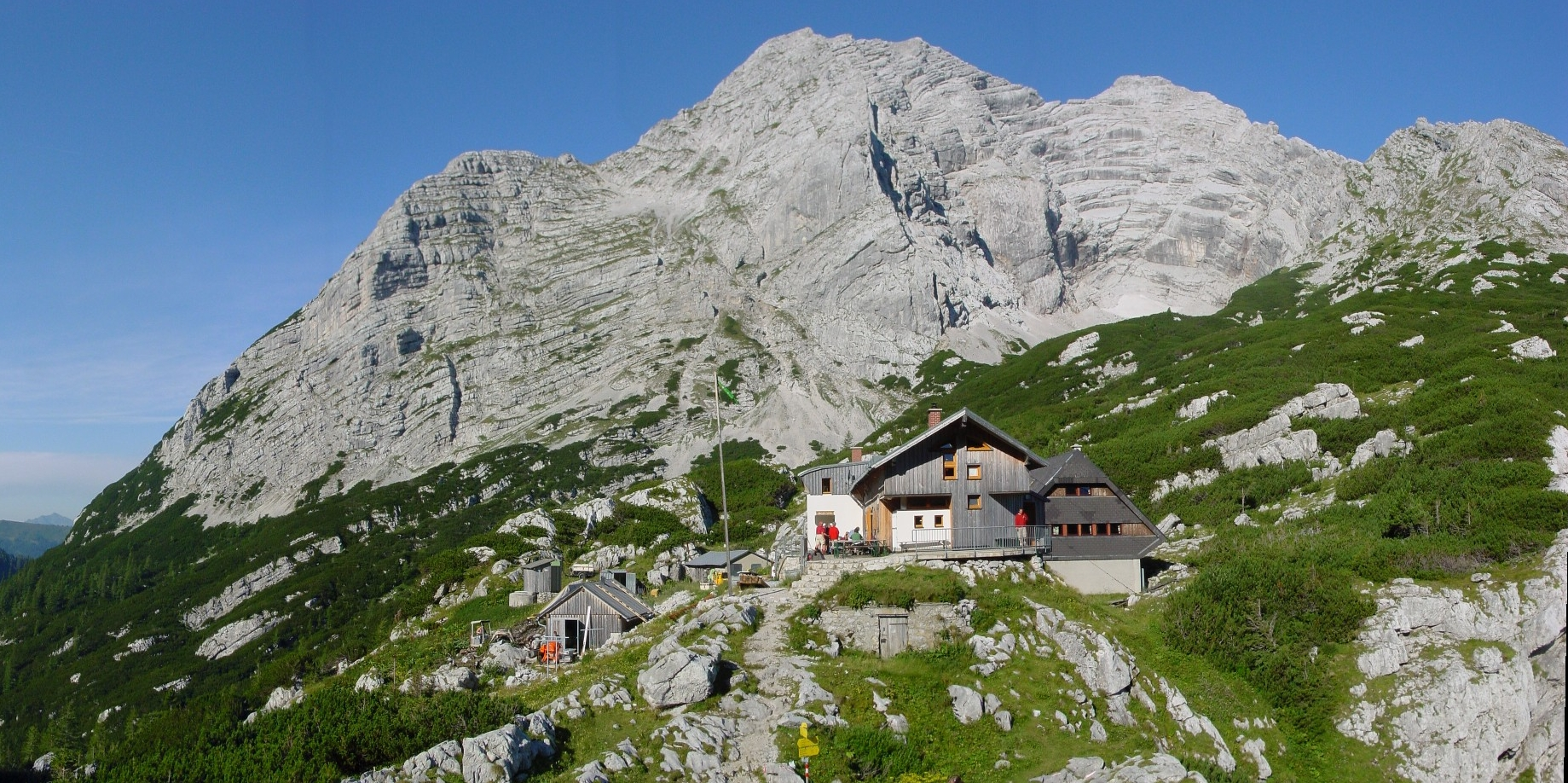
- The Hochtor, in the foreground the Hesshütte

Highest point
- Peak: Hochtor
- Elevation: 2,369 m (7,772 ft)
- Coordinates: 47°33′44″N 14°38′01″E

Naming
- Native name: Steirische Nordalpen (German)

Geography
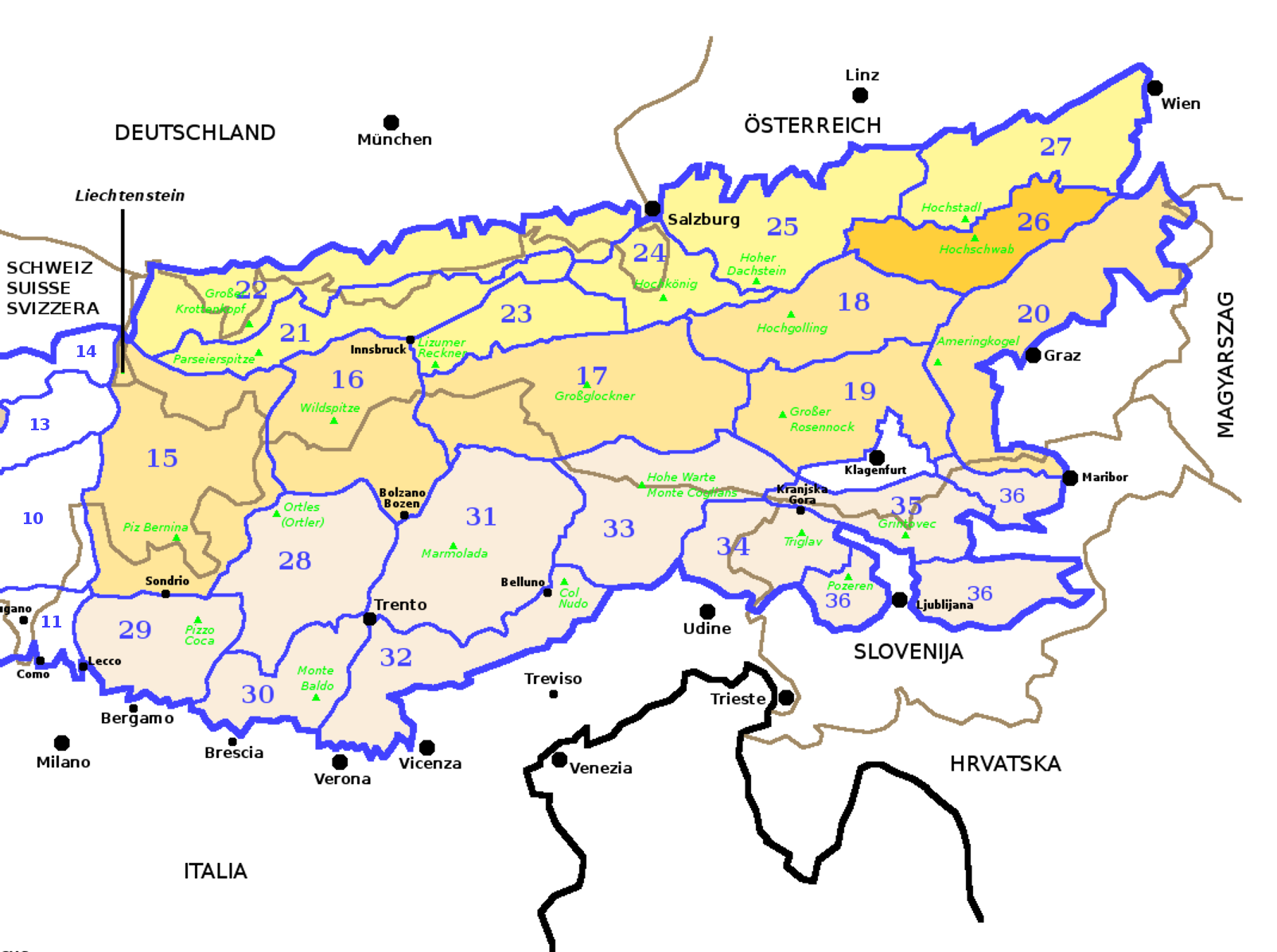
- Northern Styrian Alps (section nr.26) within Eastern Alps
- Country: Austria
- States of Austria: Styria, Upper Austria and Lower Austria
- Parent range: Alps
- Borders on: Styrian Prealps, Eastern Tauern Alps, Salzkammergut and Upper Austria Alps and Northern Lower Austria Alps

Geology
- Orogeny: Alpine orogeny
- Rock type: Sedimentary rocks

The Northern Styrian Alps (Steirische Nordalpen in German) is the proposed name for a subdivision of mountain ranges in an as-yet-unadopted classification of the Alps located in Austria.

== Geography ==
Administratively the range belongs to the Austrian state of Styria and, marginally, to Upper Austria and Lower Austria. The whole range is drained by the Danube river.

=== SOIUSA classification ===
According to SOIUSA (International Standardized Mountain Subdivision of the Alps) the mountain range is an Alpine section, classified in the following way:

- main part = Eastern Alps
- major sector = Northern Limestone Alps
- section = Northern Styrian Alps
- code = II/B-26

=== Subdivision ===
The range is divided in two Alpine subsections:

- Ennstal Alps - SOIUSA code:II/B-26.I;
- North-eastern Styrian Alps - SOIUSA code:II/B-26.II;

These subsections are further subdivided in supergroups as it follows:

- Ennstal Alps:
  - supergroup Haller Mauern - SOIUSA code:II/B-26.I-A,
  - supergroup Gesäuse - SOIUSA code:II/B-26.I-B,
  - supergroup Eisenerzer Alpen - SOIUSA code:II/B-26.I-C.
- North-eastern Styrian Alps:
  - supergroup Hochschwabgruppe - SOIUSA code:II/B-26.II-A,
  - supergroup Mürzsteger Alpen - SOIUSA code:II/B-26.II-B,
  - supergroup Rax-Schneeberg-Gruppe - SOIUSA code:II/B-26.II-C.

== Notable summits ==
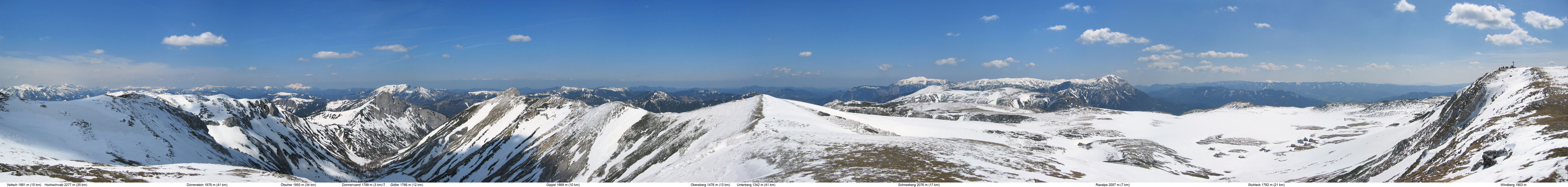
Panorama from near the peak (Windberg) of the Schneealpe

Some notable summits of the range are:

| Name | metres | feet |
|---|---|---|
| Hochtor | 2,369 | 7,770 |
| Hochschwab | 2,278 | 7,472 |
| Klosterwappen | 2,076 | 6,809 |
| Hohe Veitsch | 1,981 | 6,498 |
| Messnerin | 1,835 | 6,019 |
