= Northern Lower Austria Alps =

- Lower Austria Alps
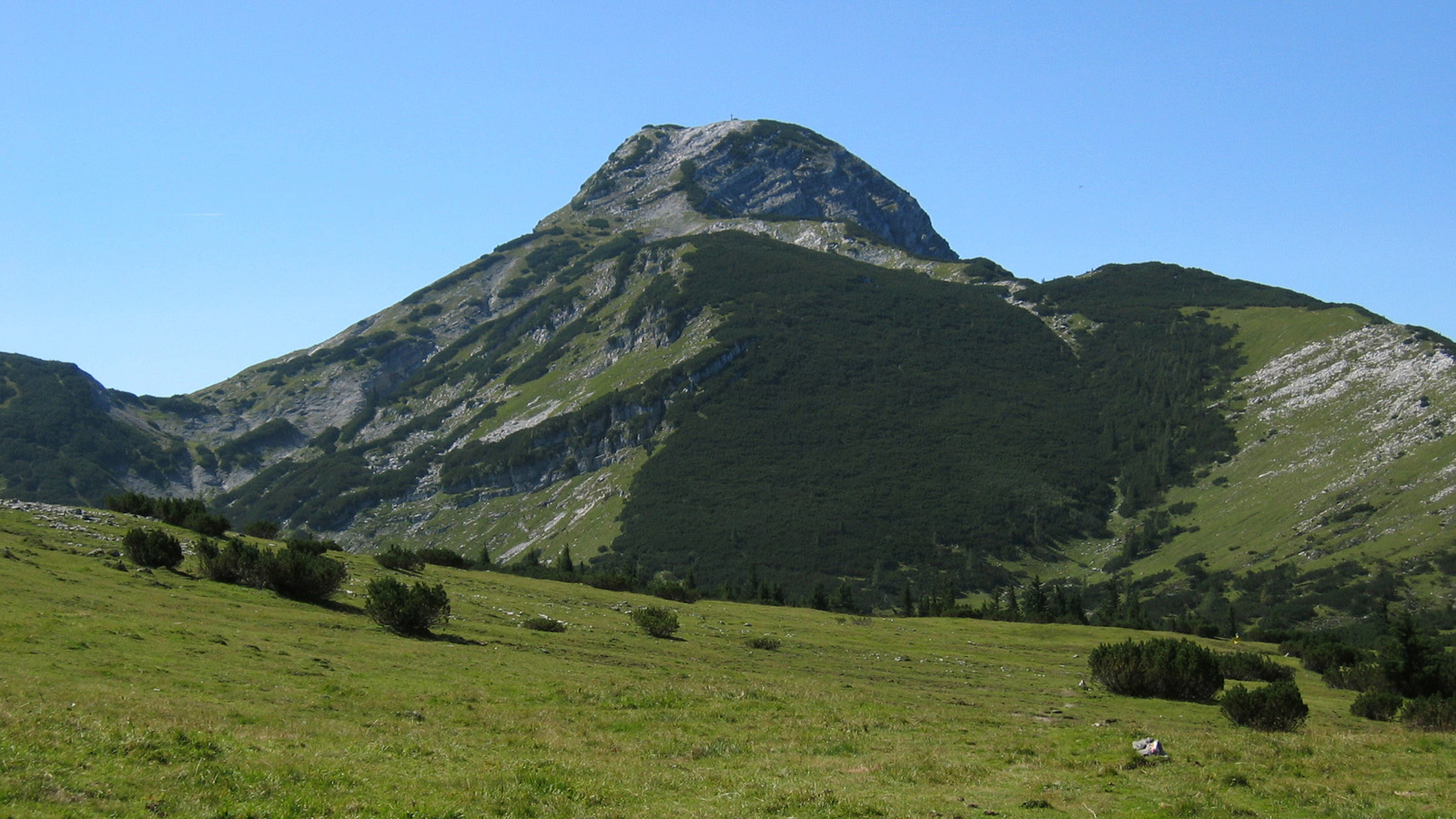
- Hochstadl (Kräuterin group)

Highest point
- Peak: Hochstadl
- Elevation: 1,919 m (6,296 ft)
- Coordinates: 47°41′11″N 15°04′31″E

Naming
- Native name: Niederösterreichische Nordalpen (German)

Geography
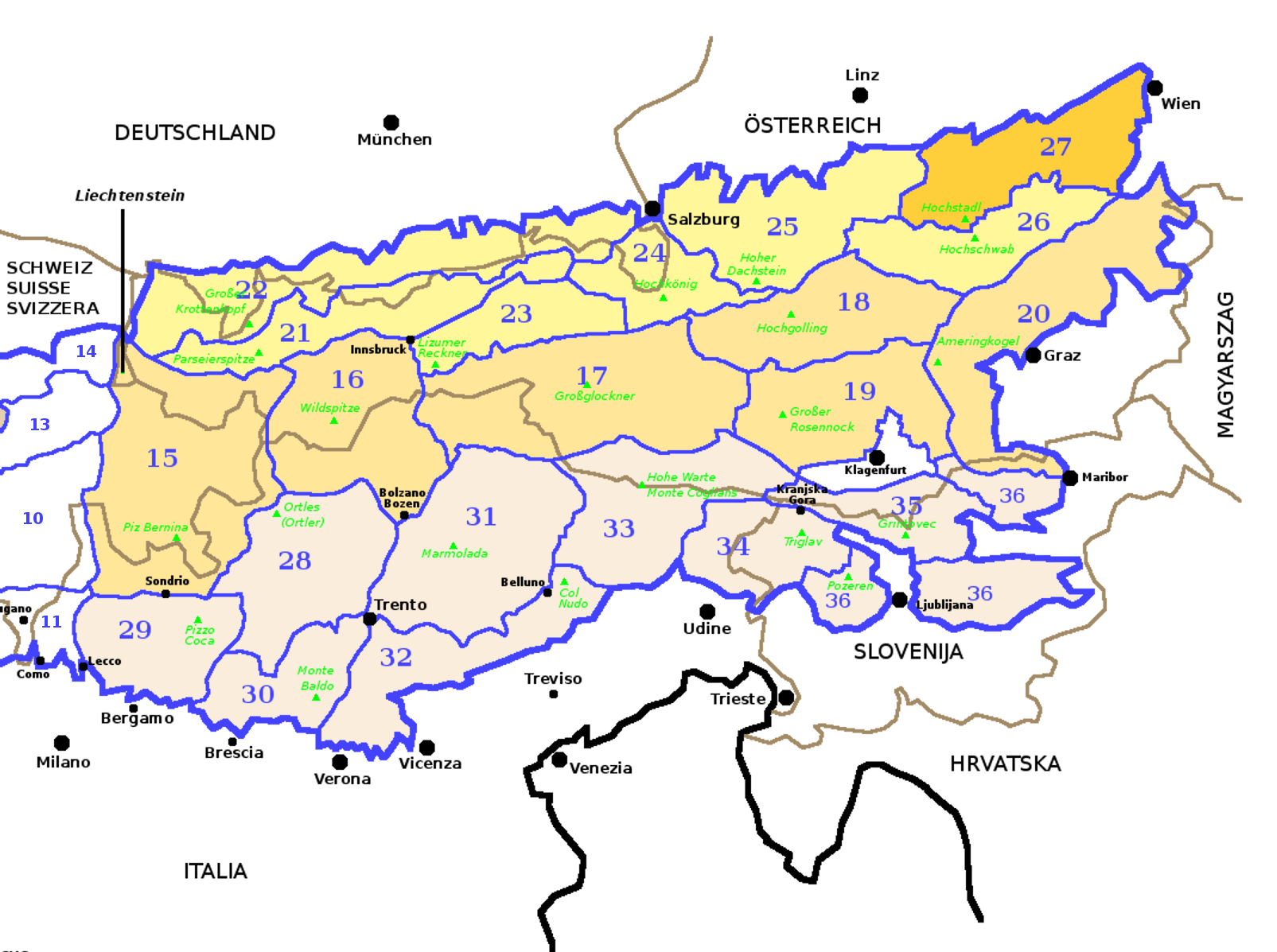
- Northern Lower Austria Alps (section nr.27) within Eaestern Alps
- Country: Austria
- States of Austria: Lower Austria, Upper Austria, Styria
- Parent range: Alps
- Borders on: Salzkammergut and Upper Austria Alps and Northern Styrian Alps

Geology
- Orogeny: Alpine orogeny
- Rock type: Sedimentary rocks

The Northern Lower Austria Alps or Lower Austria Alps (Niederösterreichische Nordalpen in German) is the proposed name for a subdivision of mountains in a new, and as yet unadopted, classification of the Alps. They are the northernmost section of the Alps.

== Geography ==
Administratively the range belongs to the Austrian state of Lower Austria and, marginally, to the states of Upper Austria and Styria. The whole range is drained by the Danube river.

=== SOIUSA classification ===
According to the proposal by SOIUSA (International Standardized Mountain Subdivision of the Alps), the mountain range is an Alpine section, classified in the following way:

- main part = Eastern Alps
- major sector = Northern Limestone Alps
- section = Northern Lower Austria Alps
- code = II/B-27

=== Subdivision ===
Lower Austria Alps are divided into three Alpine subsections:

- Türnitzer Alpen - SOIUSA code:II/B-27.I;
- Ybbstaler Alpen - SOIUSA code:II/B-27.II;
- Östliche Niederösterreichische Voralpen - SOIUSA code:II/B-27.III.

== Summits ==
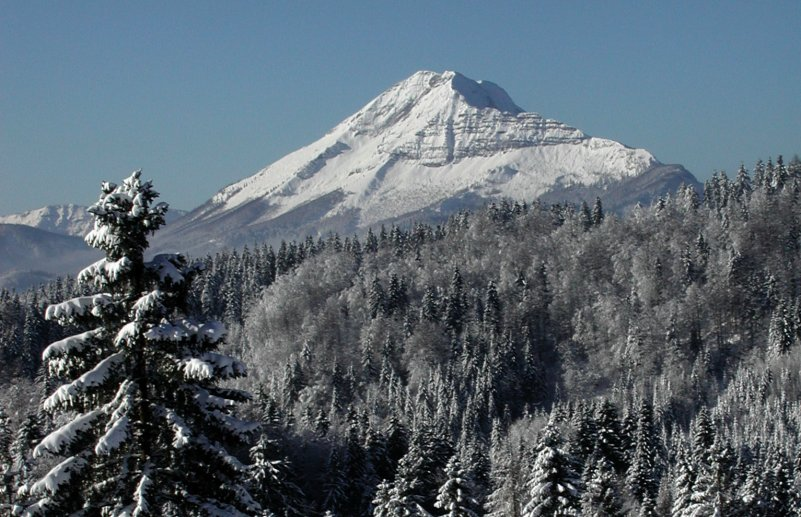
The Ötscher in winter

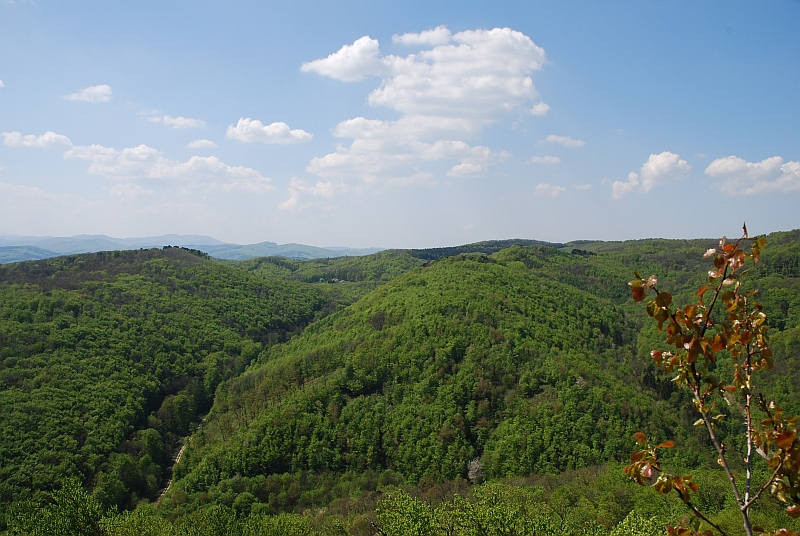
The Wienerwald, in the north-eastern part of the range

The chief summits of the range are:

| Name | metres | feet |
|---|---|---|
| Hochstadl | 1,919 | 6,294 |
| Ötscher | 1,893 | 6,209 |
| Großer Sulzberg | 1,400 | 4,592 |
| Reisalpe | 1,399 | 4,589 |
| Tirolerkogel | 1,380 | 4,526 |
| Bürgeralpe | 1,002 | 4,166 |
| Traisenberg | 1,002 | 4,034 |
| Eibl | 1,002 | 3,287 |
| Schöpfl | 893 | 2,929 |
