= Traungold Cave =

Cave in the Totes Gebirge in Styria

Traungoldhöhle
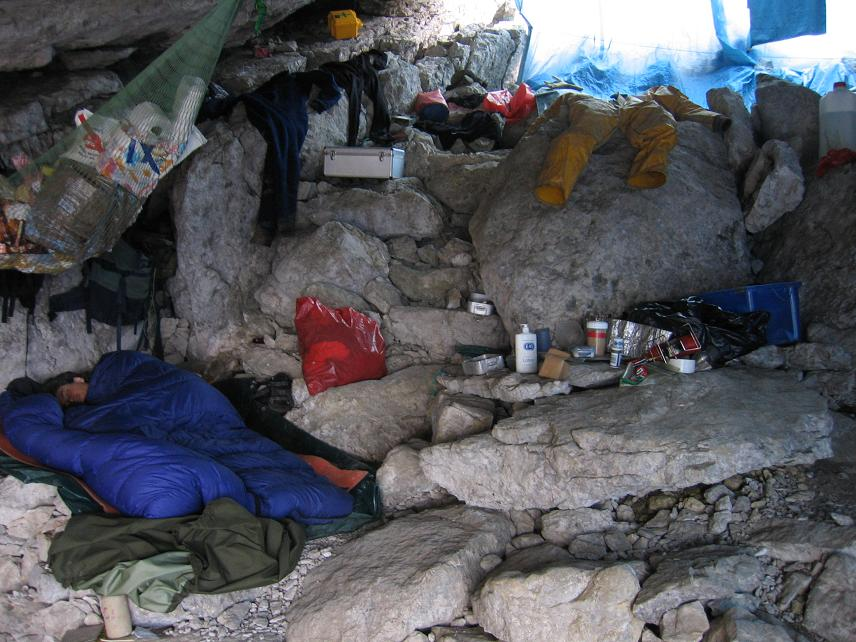
- Traungoldhöhle entrance e, now filled in for use as a bivouac shelter
- Interactive map of Traungoldhöhle
- Location: Loser Plateau, Austria
- Coordinates: 47°41.456′N 13°49.310′E
- Depth: 27 metres
- Length: 229 metres
- Discovery: Cambridge University Caving Club 1999
- Geology: Limestone
- Entrances: 9
- Translation: Traungold (local brand of cheese) Cave (German)
- Cave survey: http://expo.survex.com/1623/231/231surveylarge.jpg

Traungold Cave (German: Traungoldhöhle, no. 1623/231 in the Austrian Cave Register) is a cave which has provided shelter and storage space to the Cambridge University Caving Club during their expeditions to Austria. Entrance E and F are two ends of a large stone arch, which has been developed into a bivouac shelter known as the "Stone Bridge." The location allows easy access to Steinbrücken Cave for exploration trips. Over the years the floor has been remodelled by filling in holes with stones to create more flat ground, and during this process the connection between entrances E and F and the rest of the cave was filled in. Food must be stored off the floor in hammocks to avoid becoming infested by mice.

Between expeditions, gear and food are stored inside B entrance.
