= Burgruine Sturmberg =

Castle in Austria

Coordinates: 47.233°N 15.609°E

- Styria, Austria
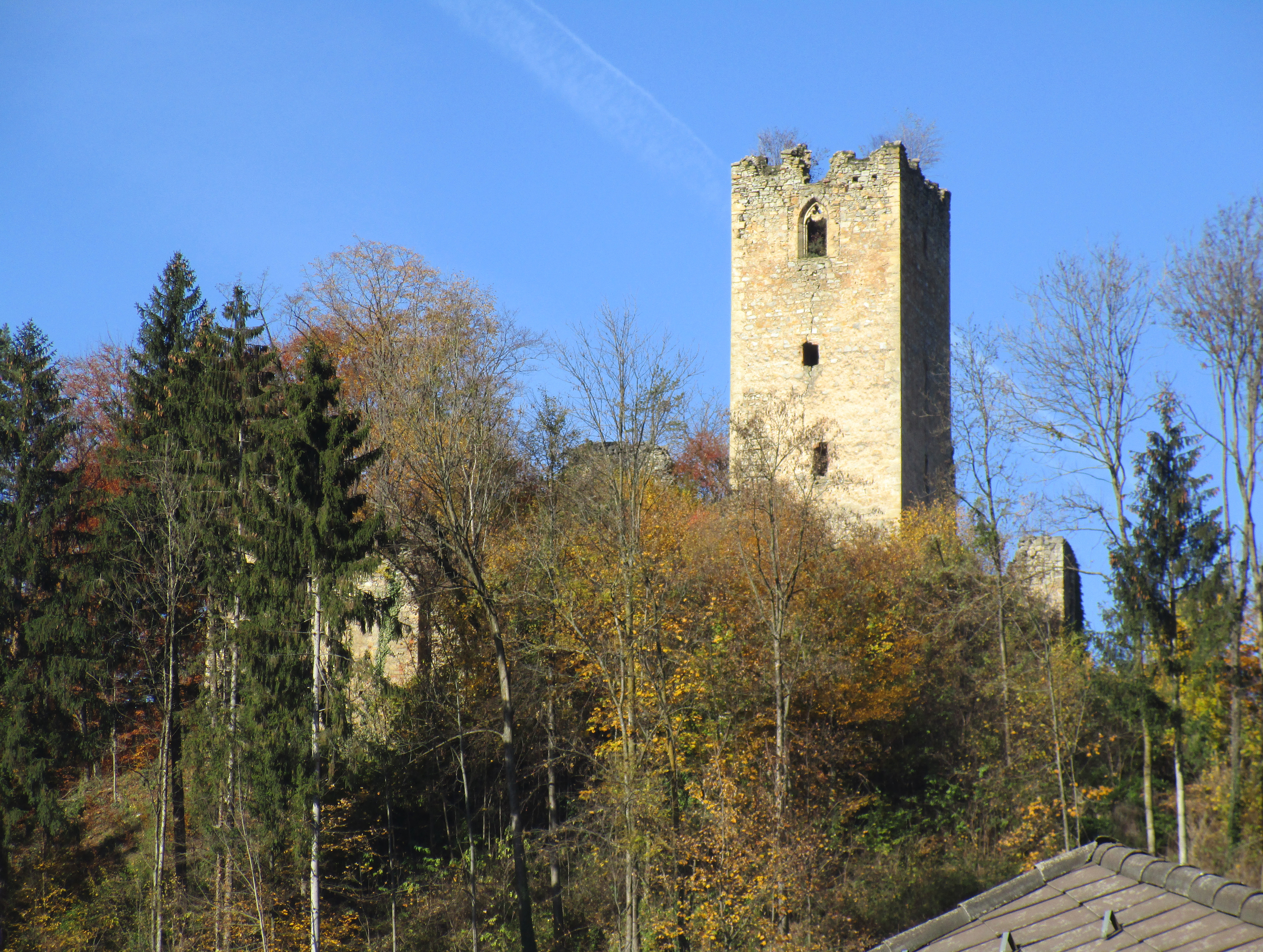

Site information
- Type: Castle

Burgruine Sturmberg is a castle in Naas, Styria, Austria.

== See also ==
- List of castles in Austria
