= Ötscher =

Mountain in Lower Austria

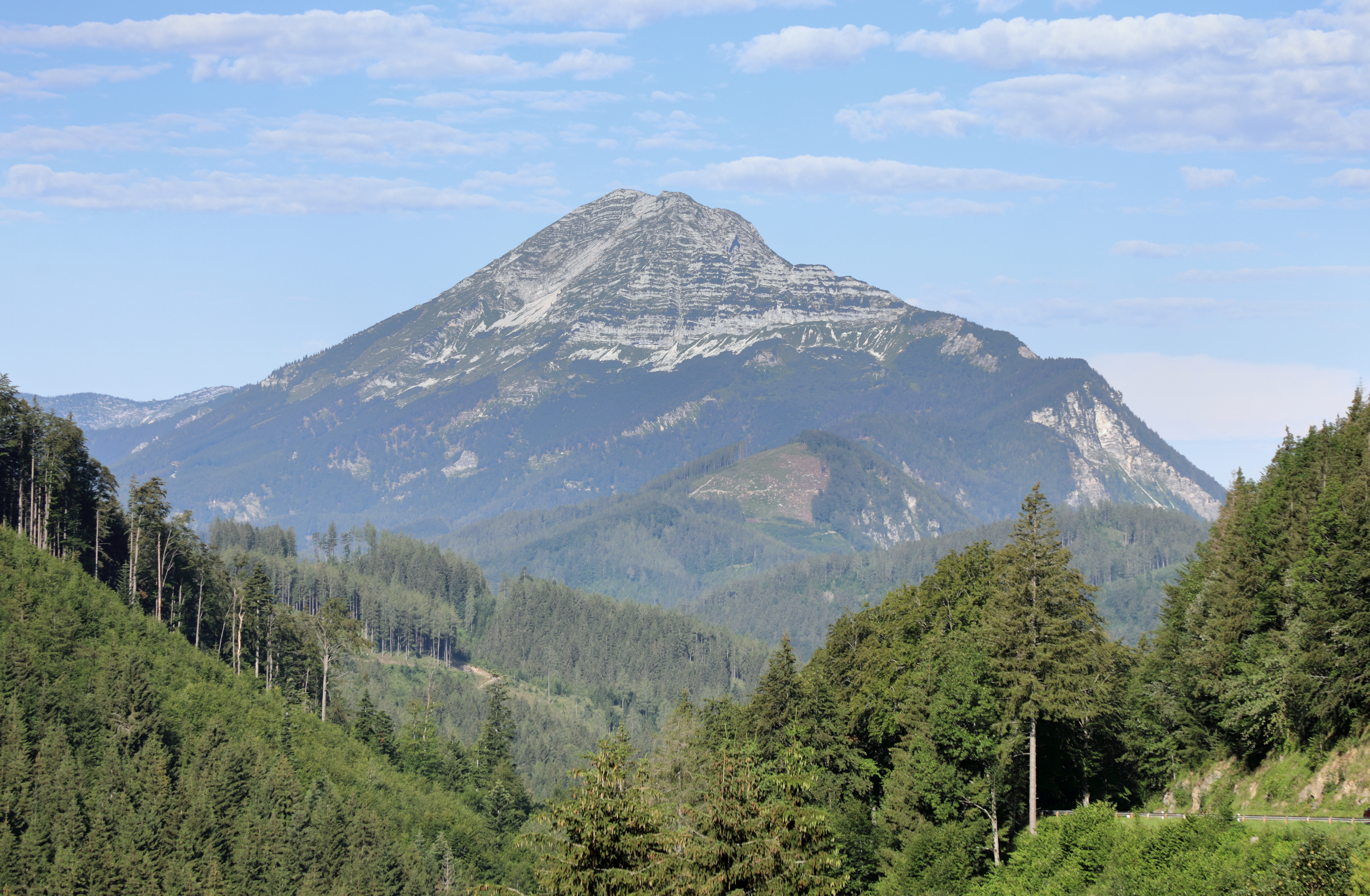
- The Ötscher from Annaberg

Highest point
- Elevation: 1,893 m (6,211 ft)AT
- Prominence: 821 m (2,694 ft)Zeller Sattel
- Parent peak: Kräuterin
- Coordinates: 47°51′21″N 15°12′10″E

Geography
- Location within Austria
- Location: Lower Austria, Austria
- Parent range: Ybbstal Alps

The Ötscher, at 1,893 metres (6,211 ft), is a prominent peak in south-western Lower Austria. Its name has Slavic roots and translates approximately as a diminutive of "father". The Ötscher area belongs to the Ybbstal Alps, which are part of the Northern Limestone Alps. The boundary between the districts of Lilienfeld and Scheibbs lies directly on its peak.
