= Salzkammergut and Upper Austria Alps =

Mountain range in Austria

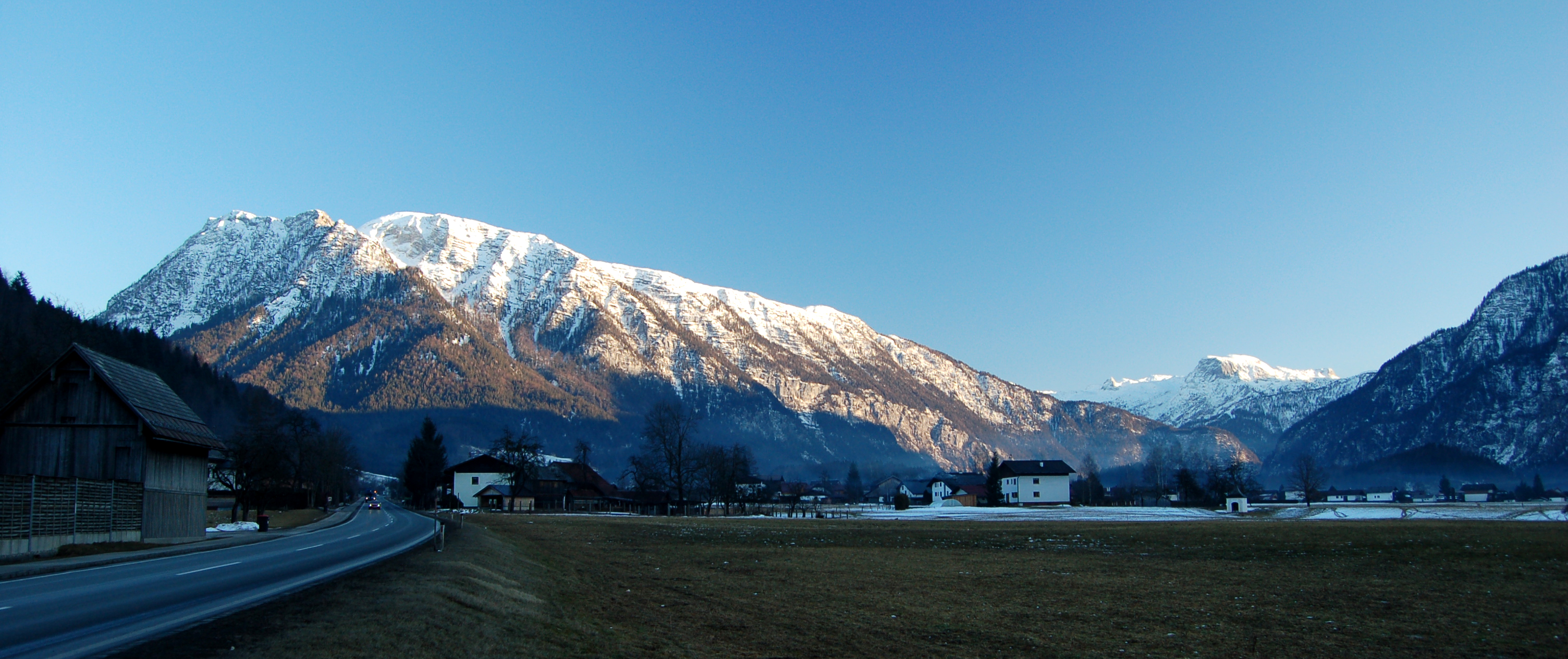
- Hoher Sarstein as seen from Bad Goisern

Highest point
- Peak: Hoher Dachstein
- Elevation: 2,995 m (9,826 ft)
- Coordinates: 47°28′32″N 13°36′23″E

Naming
- Native name: Oberösterreichisch-Salzkammerguter Alpen (German)

Geography
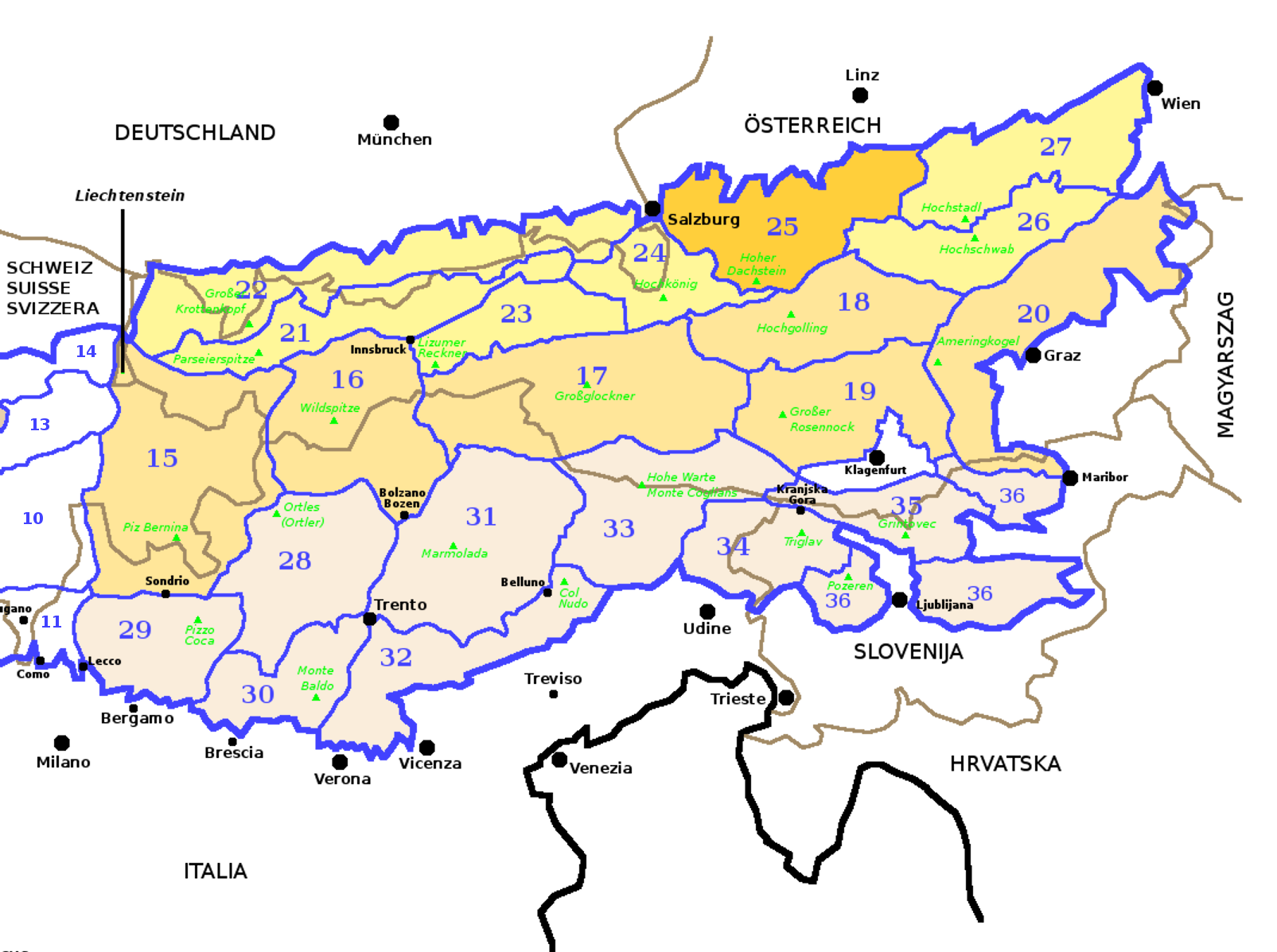
- Salzkammergut and Upper Austria Alps (section nr.25) within Eaestern Alps
- Country: Austria
- States of Austria: Upper Austria, Salzburg and Styria
- Parent range: Alps
- Borders on: Northern Salzburg Alps, Northern Styrian Alps, Northern Lower Austria Alps and Eastern Tauern Alps

Geology
- Orogeny: Alpine orogeny
- Rock type: Sedimentary rocks

The Salzkammergut and Upper Austria Alps (Oberösterreichisch-Salzkammerguter Alpen in German) is the proposed name for a subdivision of mountains in a new classification of the Alps located in Austria.

== Etymology ==
Salzkammergut is the name of a historical territory and literally means Estate of the Salt Chamber; it derives from the Imperial Salt Chamber, the authority charged with running the precious salt mines in the Habsburg Empire.

== Geography ==
Administratively the range belongs to the Austrian state of Upper Austria, Salzburg and, marginally, to Styria. The whole range is drained by the Danube.

=== SOIUSA classification ===
According to SOIUSA (International Standardized Mountain Subdivision of the Alps) the mountain range is an Alpine section, classified in the following way:

- main part = Eastern Alps
- major sector = Northern Limestone Alps
- section = Salzkammergut and Upper Austria Alps
- code = II/B-25

=== Subdivision ===
The range is divided into four Alpine subsections:

- Dachstein mountains (De:Dachsteingebirge) – SOIUSA code:II/B-25.I;
- Salzkammergut mountains (De:Salzkammergut-Berge) – SOIUSA code:II/B-25.II;
- Totes mountains (De:Totes Gebirge) – SOIUSA code:II/B-25.III;
- Upper Austrian Prealps (De:Oberösterreichische Voralpen) – SOIUSA code:II/B-25.IV.

== Notable summits ==
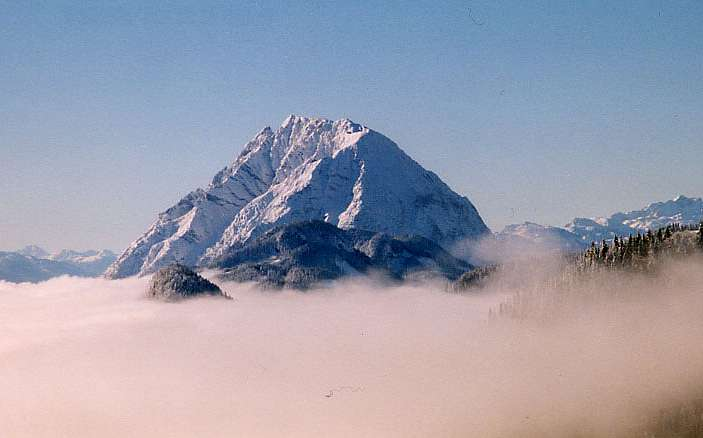
The Grimming in winter

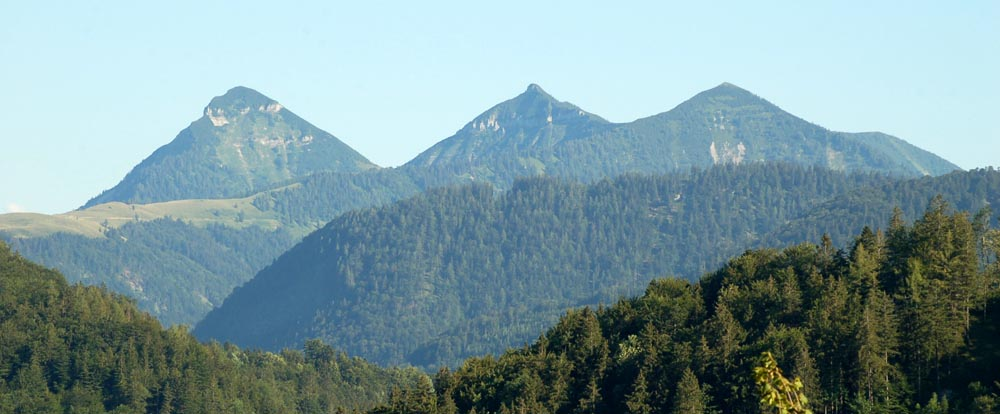
Gennerhorn, Gruberhorn and Regenspitz, in the Salzkammergut Mountains

Some notable summits of the range are:

Name	metres	feet
Hoher Dachstein	2,995	8,924
Großer Priel	2,515	8,251
Grimming	2,351	7,711
Rotgschirr	2,270	7,448
Gamsfeld	2,027	6,649
Hoher Sarstein	1,975	6,440
Hoher Nock	1,963	6,438
