= Hochstadl =

Mountain in Austria

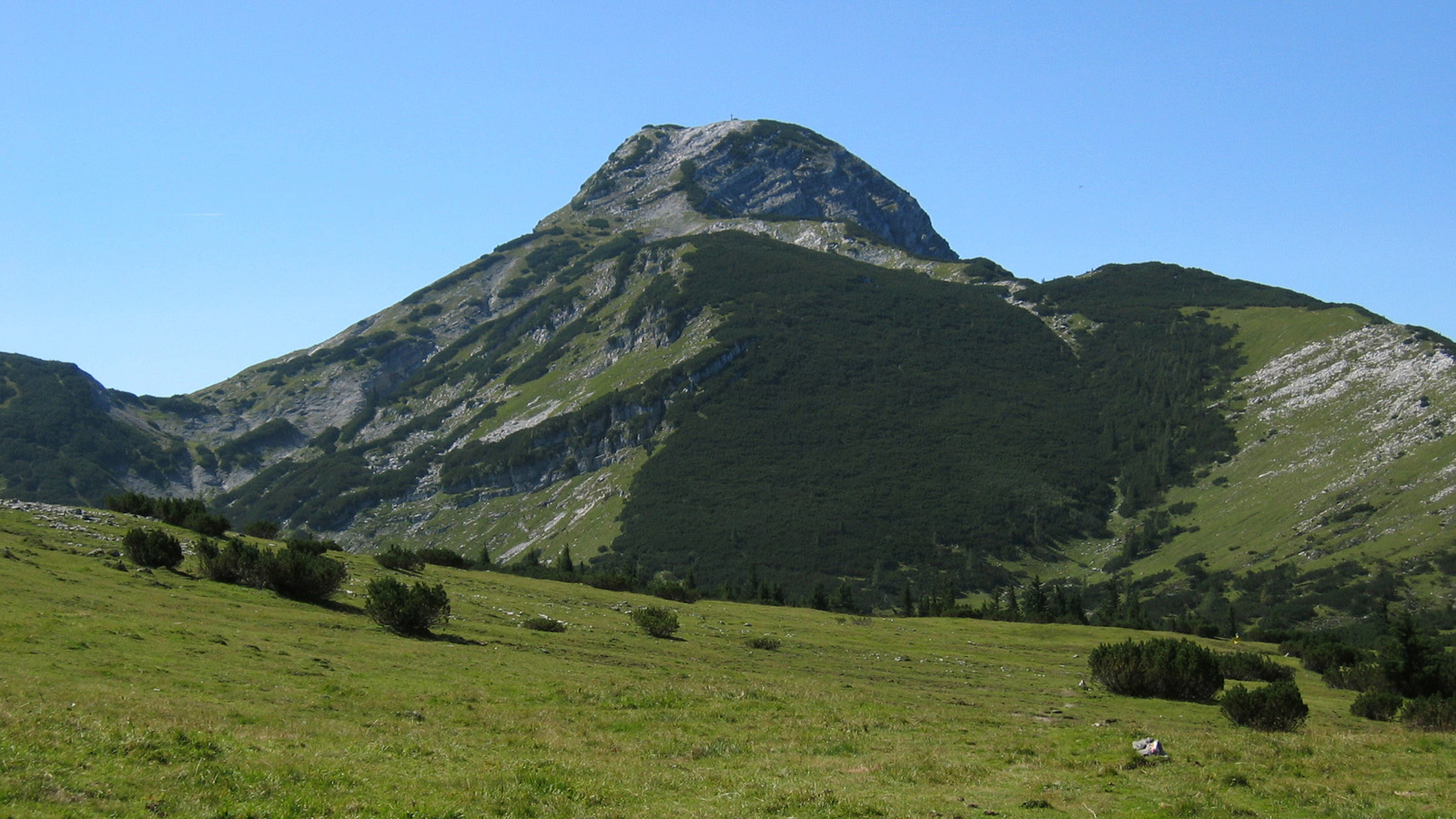
- The Hochstadl seen from northeast.

Highest point
- Elevation: 1,919 m (6,296 ft)
- Prominence: 1,072 m (3,517 ft)
- Coordinates: 47°41′11″N 15°04′31″E

Geography
- Location within Alps
- Location: Styria, Austria
- Parent range: Northern Lower Austria Alps

Climbing
- Easiest route: through the Kräuterinhütte

The Hochstadl is a mountain of the Ybbstal Alps located in Styria, Austria, belonging to the Kräuterin karst massif. It is the highest summit of the Northern Lower Austria Alps.

== Geography ==
Administratively the mountain belongs to the Austrian state of Styria.

== Access to the summit ==
The suggested route for the mountain starts from Dürradmer and reaches the top through the Kräuterinhütte (Kräuterin mountain hut) at 1,394 m.
