= Dürrenstein (Austria) =

Mountain in Lower Austria

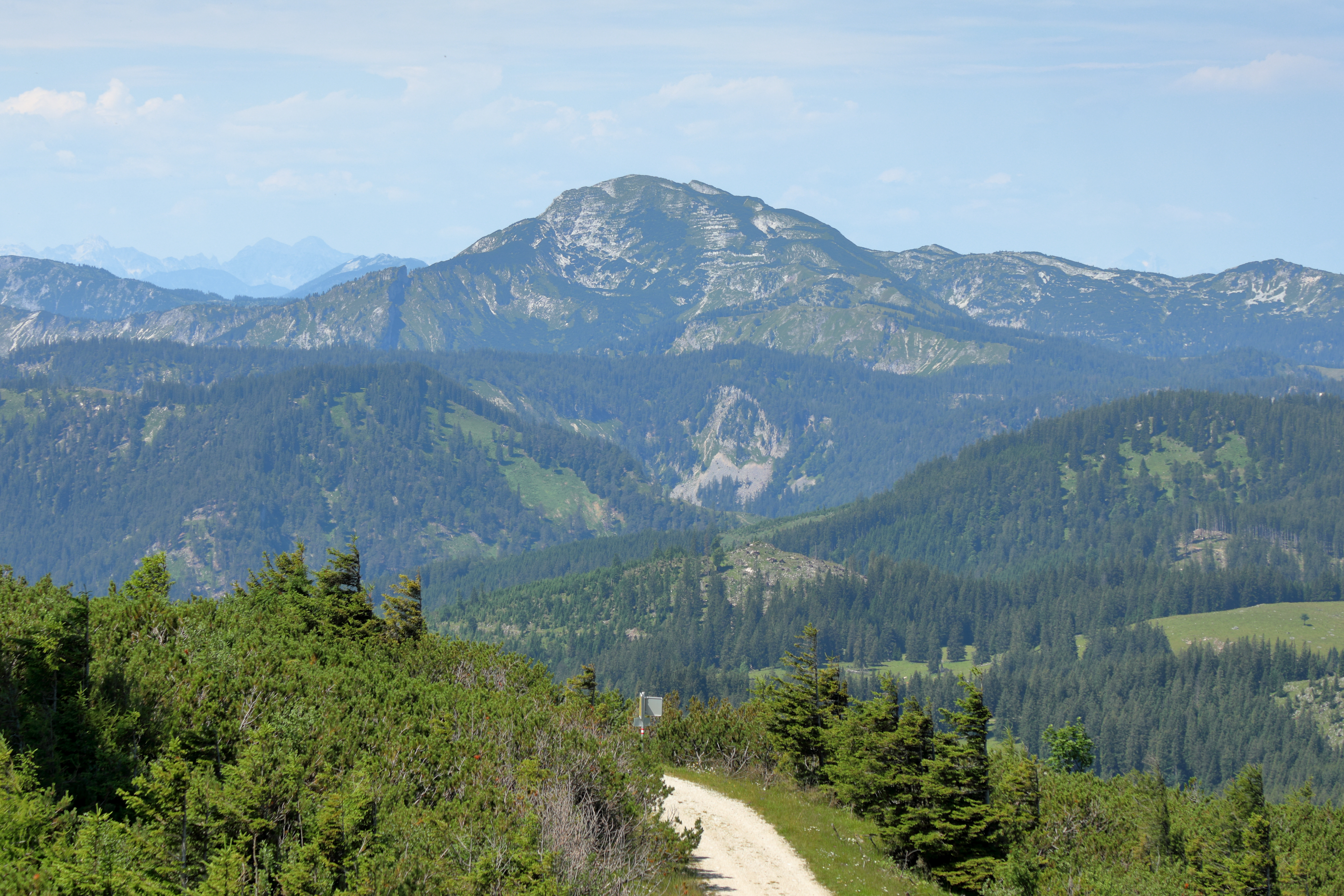
- Dürrenstein seen from Gemeindealpe (East view)

Highest point
- Elevation: 1,878 m (6,161 ft)
- Prominence: 809 m (2,654 ft)
- Coordinates: 47°47′N 15°03′E

Geography
- Location within Austria
- Location: Lower Austria, Austria

Dürrenstein is a mountain in Lower Austria (Niederösterreich), part of the Ybbstal Alps in the Northern Limestone Alps. Its elevation is about 1,878 m (6,160 ft), making it one of the higher peaks in the area.

The mountain is located near the municipality of Lunz am See, south of the beautiful turquoise Lake Lunz.

== UNESCO World Heritage & Protection ==
A large portion of the wilderness area around Dürrenstein has been under protection since 2002 and is classified under IUCN wilderness categories (Ia and Ib), meaning minimal human interference.

Since 2017 parts of the Dürrenstein-Lassingtal Wilderness Area are also listed as a UNESCO World Natural Heritage Site as part of the Ancient and Primeval Beech Forests of the Carpathians and Other Regions of Europe

The area spans roughly 7,000 hectares from valley floor up to the summit and hosts ancient trees (some over 500–600 years old) and a rich mix of wildlife.
