= Schwarzenbach an der Pielach =

- Municipality
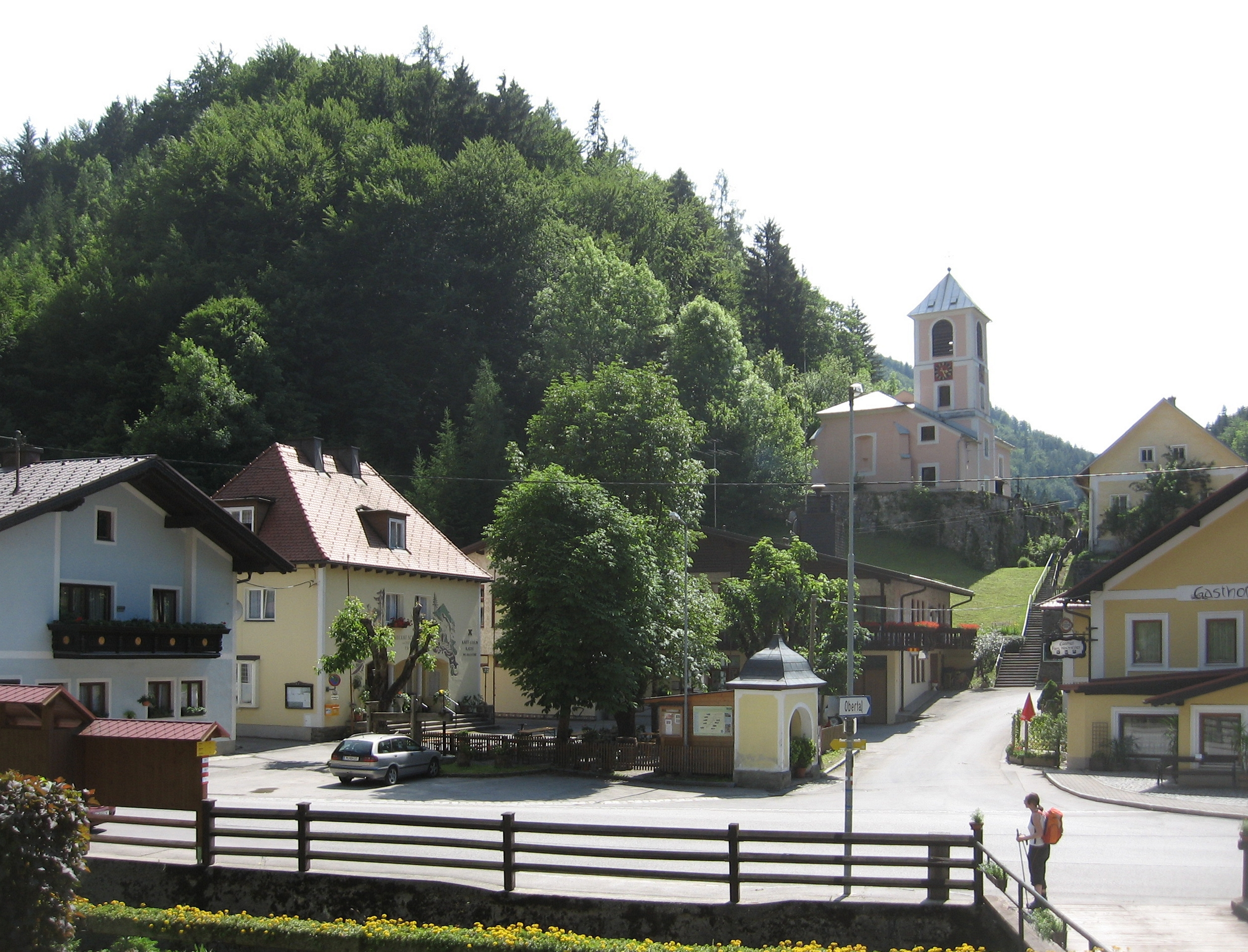
- Town centre

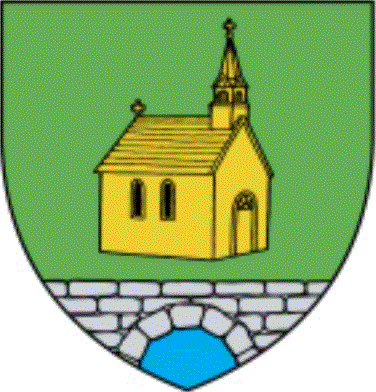
- Coat of arms

- Location within Austria
- Coordinates: 47°56′00″N 15°23′00″E
- Country: Austria
- State: Lower Austria
- District: Sankt Pölten-Land

Government
  - Mayor: Andreas Ganaus (ÖVP)

Area
  - Total: 45.45 km^{2} (17.55 sq mi)
- Elevation: 510 m (1,670 ft)

Population (2018-01-01)
  - Total: 369
  - Density: 8.12/km^{2} (21.0/sq mi)
- Time zone: UTC+1 (CET)
  - Summer (DST): UTC+2 (CEST)
- Postal code: 3212
- Area code: 02724
- Vehicle registration: PL

Schwarzenbach an der Pielach is a municipality in the district of Sankt Pölten-Land in the Austrian state of Lower Austria.

== Population ==
Historical population
Year	Pop.	±%
1971	511	—
1981	476	−6.8%
1991	450	−5.5%
2001	427	−5.1%
