= Steinbrücken Cave =

Cave on the Loser Plateau, Austria

Steinbrückenhöhle
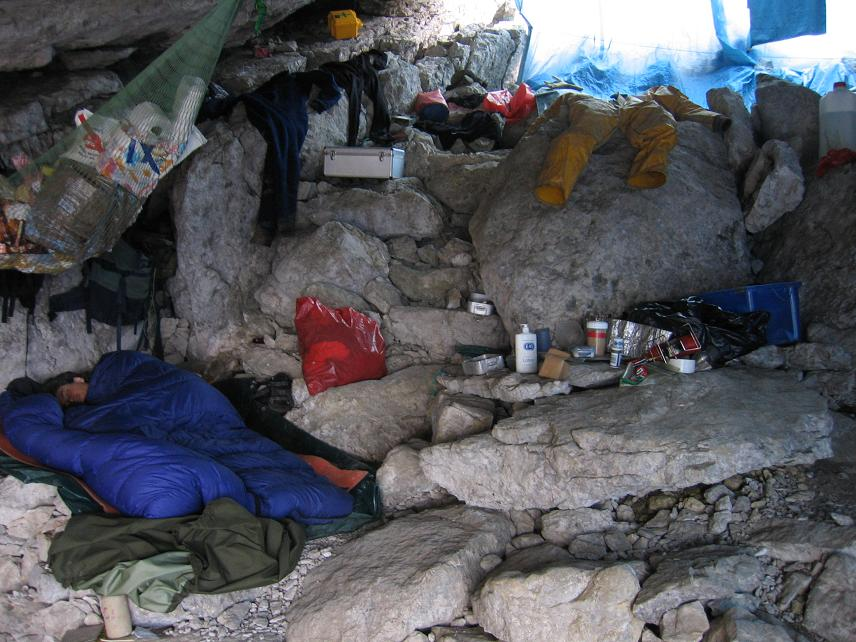
- Scene from the stone bridge bivouac shelter by the entrance

- Location within Austria
- Interactive map of Steinbrückenhöhle
- Location: Loser Plateau, Austria
- Coordinates: 47°41.456′N 13°49.288′E
- Depth: 622 metres
- Length: 15.4 kilometres
- Discovery: Cambridge University Caving Club 1999
- Geology: Limestone
- Entrances: 6
- Translation: Stone bridge cave (German)
- Cave survey: plan

Steinbrücken Cave (German: Steinbrückenhöhle, "Stone bridge cave", no. 1623/204 in the Austrian cave register) was discovered by the Cambridge University Caving Club on the Loser Plateau in 1999. It is part of the large Schwarzmooskogel cave system (German: Schwarzmooskogelhöhlensystem), and is named after a nearby natural arch. The arch is in fact a former entrance to Traungold Cave (1623/231e) which has been developed into a convenient bivouac shelter for cave explorers. The SMK system is the 17th longest cave system in the world.

== Layout ==
As of 2013, the cave has six entrances, has passages of 18.6 kilometres (11.6 mi) in length and a depth of 622 metres (2,041 ft). There are over 300 question marks (unexplored leads) of varying quality in the cave.

The position of the first entrance is Alt 1812.40, 47°41.456′N 13°49.288′E.

The originally discovered entrance A is primarily used as a route to the deepest part of the cave, "Razor Dance", a narrow rift of over 500 metres (1,600 ft) extent. 32 pitches and climbs are required to reach the terminal sump.

Most other explorations begin at entrance E, which leads through an awkward crawl to a 30-metre (98 ft) pitch that has a deposit of snow at the bottom most years. From here extensive horizontal levels of Swings and Roundabouts, Treeumphant and Rhino Rift can be reached. Descending 150 metres (490 ft) of the Gaffered series of pitches leads to another horizontal development called The Underworld. A further 50 metres (160 ft) of pitches leads to an extensive horizontal development called Subsoil. Subway Level, the lowest stratigraphical layer of the cave, can then be reached by descending 100 metres (330 ft) down the Four Pitches of the Apocalypse.

In 2014, the cave was connected to the Schwatzmooskögel System which has a combined length of over 126 kilometres (78 mi) and a vertical extent of 1,112 metres (3,648 ft).

There are over a hundred caves in the vicinity, most of which connect into the Schwatzmooskögel System. Notable caves with significant development which link into it are Tunnock Shaft, Balkonhöhle, Kaninchenhöhle, and the Stelleweg-Schnellzughöhle System (via Kaninchenhöhle).

== See also ==
- List of longest caves
