= Cambridge University Caving Club =

The Cambridge University Caving Club organizes single rope technique (SRT) training, social events, and weekend caving trips as well as longer expeditions. It was founded in 1949.

The club occasionally publishes a journal of pursuits named Cambridge Underground.

The club has held annual expeditions in a range of countries, including the Ardèche region of France for sport, Slovenia, and Ireland. Between 1988 and 1997 there were annual Christmas expeditions to Mallorca, Spain.

The main summer expedition, which has been going on nearly every year since 1976, has been to the Loser Plateau, in the Totes Gebirge Mountains, Austria. Since around 1980 the base camp has been in Bad Aussee. In addition to cave exploration and mapping, the expedition conducted microclimate and human physiology research, and pioneered hanggliding in the area.

Notable entrances that have been discovered and explored include Heimkommenhöhle, discovered in 2018, Fishcesicht Höhle and Gluklischesmetterlinghöhle discovered in 2017, Balkonöhle and Tunnockschacht, discovered in 2016, Steinbrückenhöhle (1999–2012), Kaninchenhöhle (1988–1998), Stellerweghöhle (1972–1982). These, alongside many shorter caves, are linked together to form parts of the Schwarzmooskogel system, commonly referred to as the SMK system.

As of 2024 the SMK system is over 120km long and 1033m deep. Nine tenths of this was recorded by CUCC.

Former members of the club have founded Hong Meigui cave exploration society of China, and the ExCambridge Speleologists group, ExCs.

== See also ==
- University of Bristol Spelæological Society
- Caving in the United Kingdom
