= Hochkar =

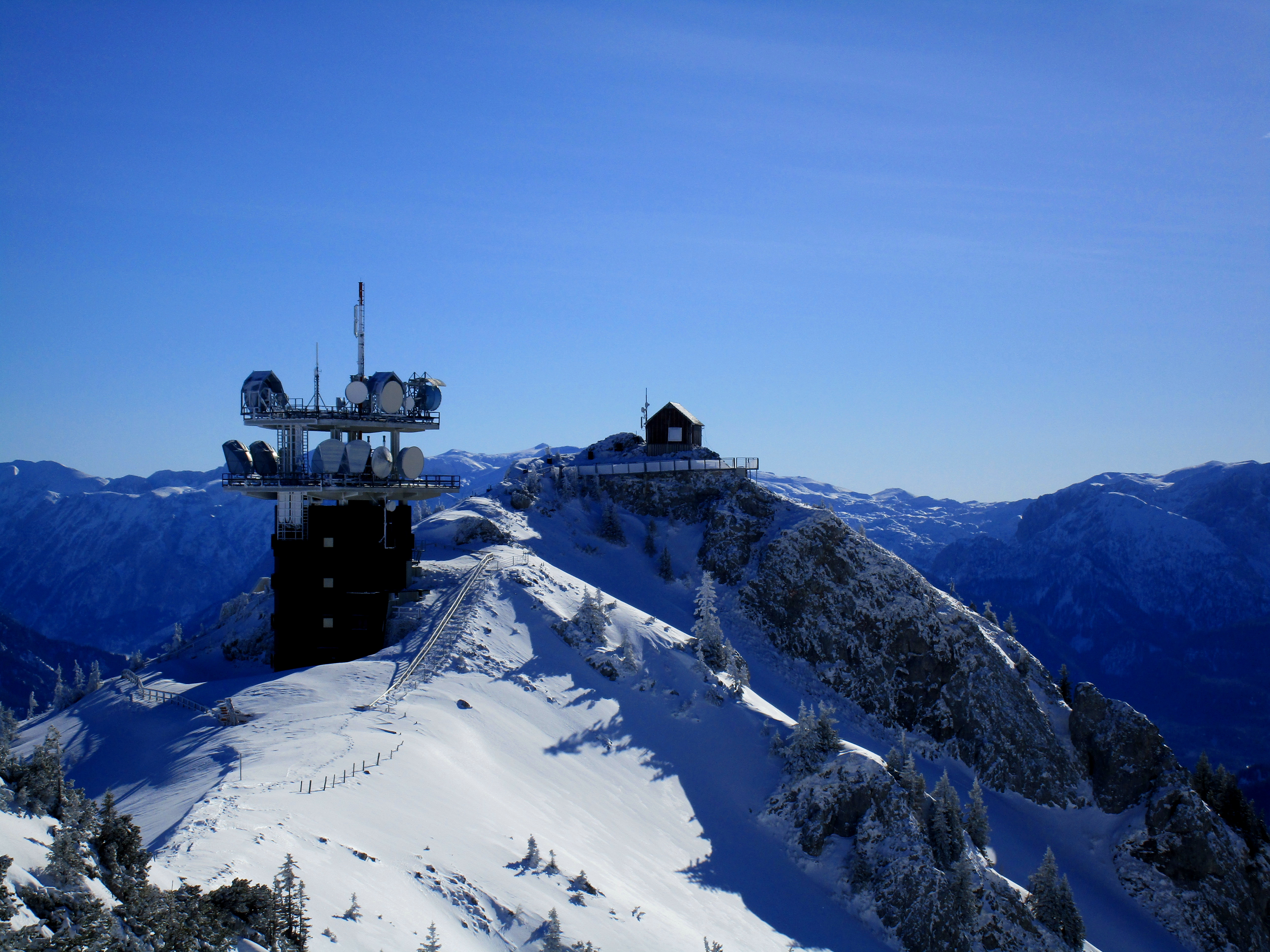
- The summit of Hochkar

Highest point
- Elevation: 1,808 m (5,932 ft)
- Prominence: 607 m (1,991 ft)
- Coordinates: 47°43′N 14°54′E

Geography
- Location within Austria
- Location: Steiermark and Lower Austria, Austria
- Parent range: Ybbstal Alps

Hochkar
- Interactive map of Hochkar
- Location: Austria
- Top elevation: 1,808 meters (5,932 ft)
- Base elevation: 1,380 meters (4,530 ft)
- Skiable area: 18.6 Piste Kilometers
- Lift system: 9 total (1 Quad Detachable Chairlift, 4 Quad Chairlift,1 Double Chairlift 3 Tow Lifts)
- Website: http://www.hochkar.com/

Hochkar (1,808 m) is a mountain and a ski area located 150 kilometers (93 mi) from Vienna. Located near the small resort of Göstling an der Ybbs on the Steiermark and Lower Austria border, it is popular among skiers who want to leave Vienna for a day, being about a two-hour drive away.

== Ski and snowboard facilities ==
The mountain has one detachable quad lift, four normal quad lifts (three with conveyors), one double chairlift and three towlifts, one of which is for children.

== Summer activities ==
The area's lifts are open in the summer for sightseeing, hiking, or mountain biking. Tours are given, only in summer, of the 600-metre-long (2,000 ft) Hochkar Cave.
