= Loser Plateau =

Plateau in the Totes Gebirge mountain range, Austria

Coordinates: 47°39′39″N 13°46′16″E

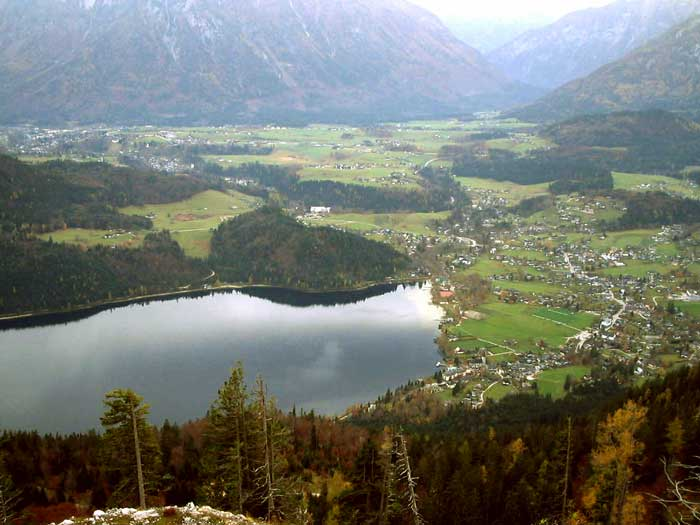
alt= Foreground: Rocky viewpoint with pine trees and few gumtrees showing early autumn. Middle : A calm, dark lake reflecting the sky. It curves along the left side of the valley. A small town/village spreads along the right side of the lake and into the valley. Houses, roads and green fields. Background: A massive mountains frame the whole valley. They fade into mist in the distance, giving it depth. They fade slopes are covered in forest and grassland. Looks peaceful, wide and untouched.

The Loser Plateau (also referred-to as the Loser-AugstEck plateau) is part of the Totes Gebirge mountain range in the Salzkammergut of Austria. It is most easily accessed up a toll road from the town of Altaussee. It is a Nature Reserve, notable for its caves and unspoilt alpine karst ecosystem. Hunting permits are issued to control chamois.

The central plateau area is relatively flat, at an altitude of 1,500-1,600m, rising gently to the north and east, and covering about 4 km^{2}. The whole massif is approximately 12 km^{2}. The area drops steeply on all sides, and is bounded to the SE by path 234 from the Wildenseehutte down to Altausseer See, to the south by the lake itself, then to the southwest by the road to Blaa-Alm. The western edge is marked by the valley of Grüne Bichl, and the northern limit is the ridge crest of Schönberg, then a rather ill-defined line back to the Wildenseehütte. Recently its southern (Loser) face has been heavily developed for skiing.

Access to the area is relatively easy at its southern edge, due to the Loser Panoramastraße toll road. This climbs the southern slopes of Loser to reach a large parking area and self-service restaurant at 1600m just below Augst See. From here, good paths reach both the southern slopes of Vd. Schwarzmooskogel, and also north to a col overlooking the extensive pathless central plateau. Both the further reaches of the central plateau and the areas around the Schönberg, Gries Kogel and Augst-Eck ridges are remote - being large pathless areas of rough karren with little or no water supplies except for snowmelt.

The plateau is full of caves - with over 230 catalogued so far in the area 1623 in the Austrian cave Kataster. Several caving clubs, including Cambridge University Caving Club and ARGE Grabenstetten, discover and explore the caves on the Plateau. Notable discoveries include: Steinbrückenhöhle, Kaninchenhöhle, Stellerweghöhle, Schwarzmooskogeleishöhle, and Raucherkarhöhle (19th longest cave in the world).

A painting by Anthony van Dyck belonging to the Rothschild family was hidden in a salt mine near the Loser Plateau during the German occupation until 1945.
