= Kräuterin =

Coordinates: 47.6853°N 15.0747°E

The Kräuterin is a karst massif with a size of 10 km by 12 km, located in the Ybbstal Alps, Austria. Its highest peak is the Hochstadl, at 1919 meters above sea level.

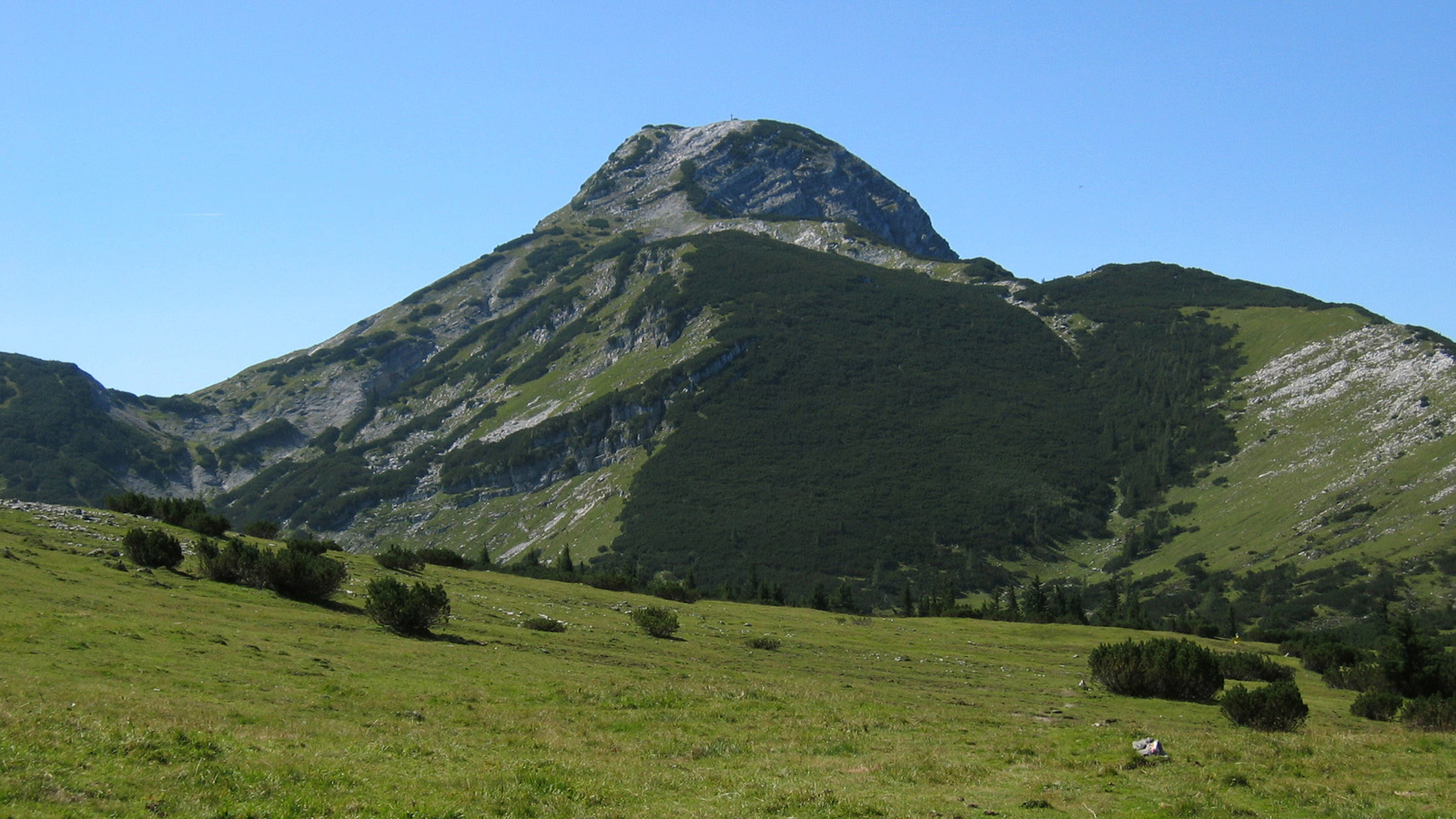

== Location and Surroundings ==
The mountain area is in northern Styria, near the border with Lower Austria. To the northwest, it is bordered by the Göstling Alps (including the Dürrenstein). To the east, it is bordered by the Mariazell Mountains (including the Großer Zellerhut, 1,639 m). To the south, it is bordered by the Salza River.
