= Ybbstal Alps =

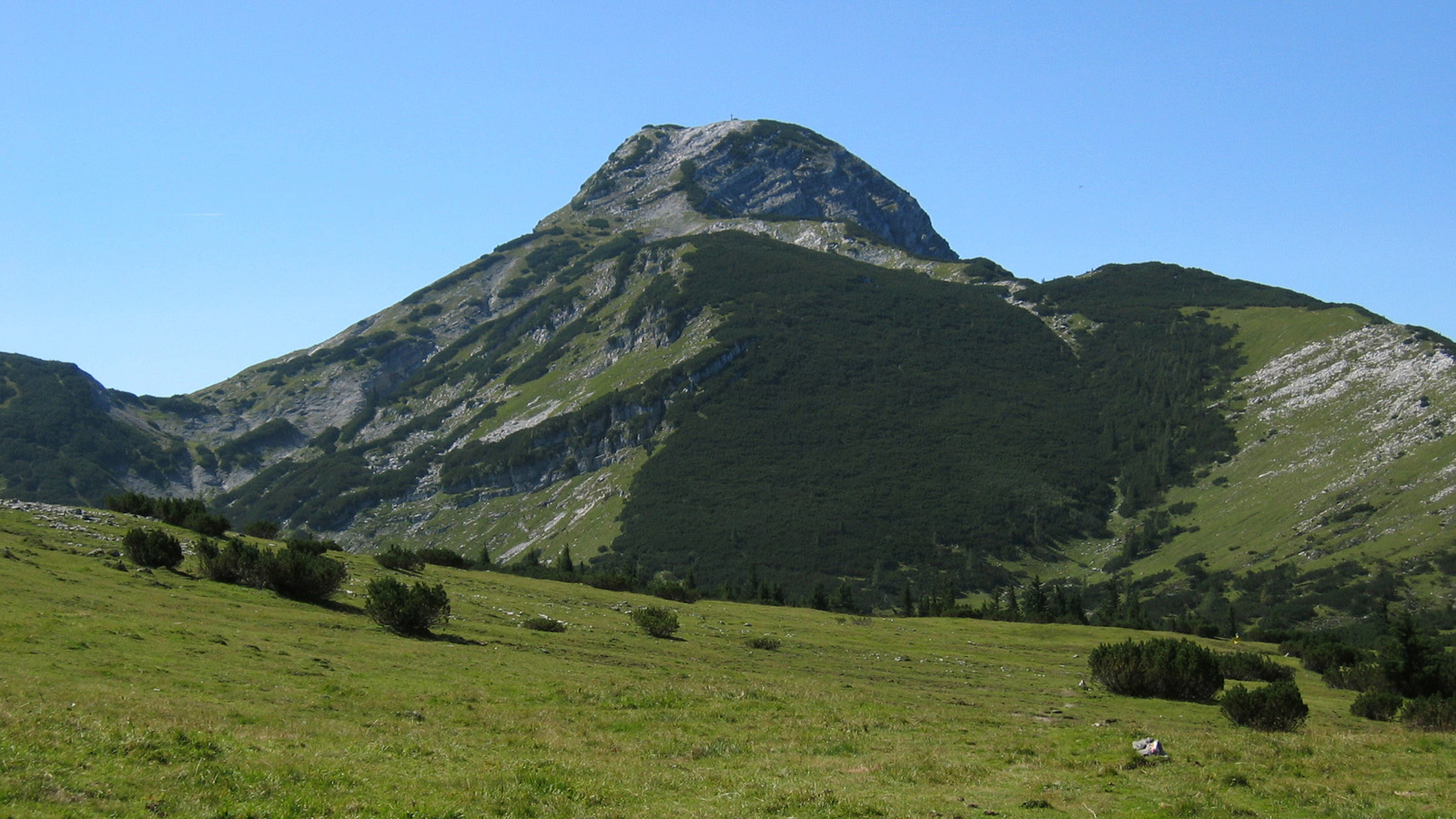
- Kräuterin with Hochstadl (1,919 m)

Highest point
- Peak: Hochstadl
- Elevation: 1,919 m (6,296 ft)

Geography
- Location within Austria
- Country: Austria
- States: Upper Austria, Lower Austria, Styria
- Range coordinates: 47°41′07″N 15°04′29″E
- Parent range: Northern Limestone Alps

The Ybbstal Alps (German: Ybbstaler Alpen) are a mountain range of the Northern Limestone Alps and part of the Eastern Alps, located in Austria.

They occupy an area along the borders of the states of Upper Austria, Lower Austria and Styria. The range includes the eastern part of the Eisenwurzen, as well as the Göstling Alps and the Kräuterin in the south.

The Göstling Alps are home to the popular skiing area at Hochkar (1,808 metres). Their highest peak is the Hochstadl, at 1,919 m (6,296 ft) above sea level.

Another popular mountain is the Dürrenstein at 1,878 m.
