= Naas, Styria =

Naas
- Municipality
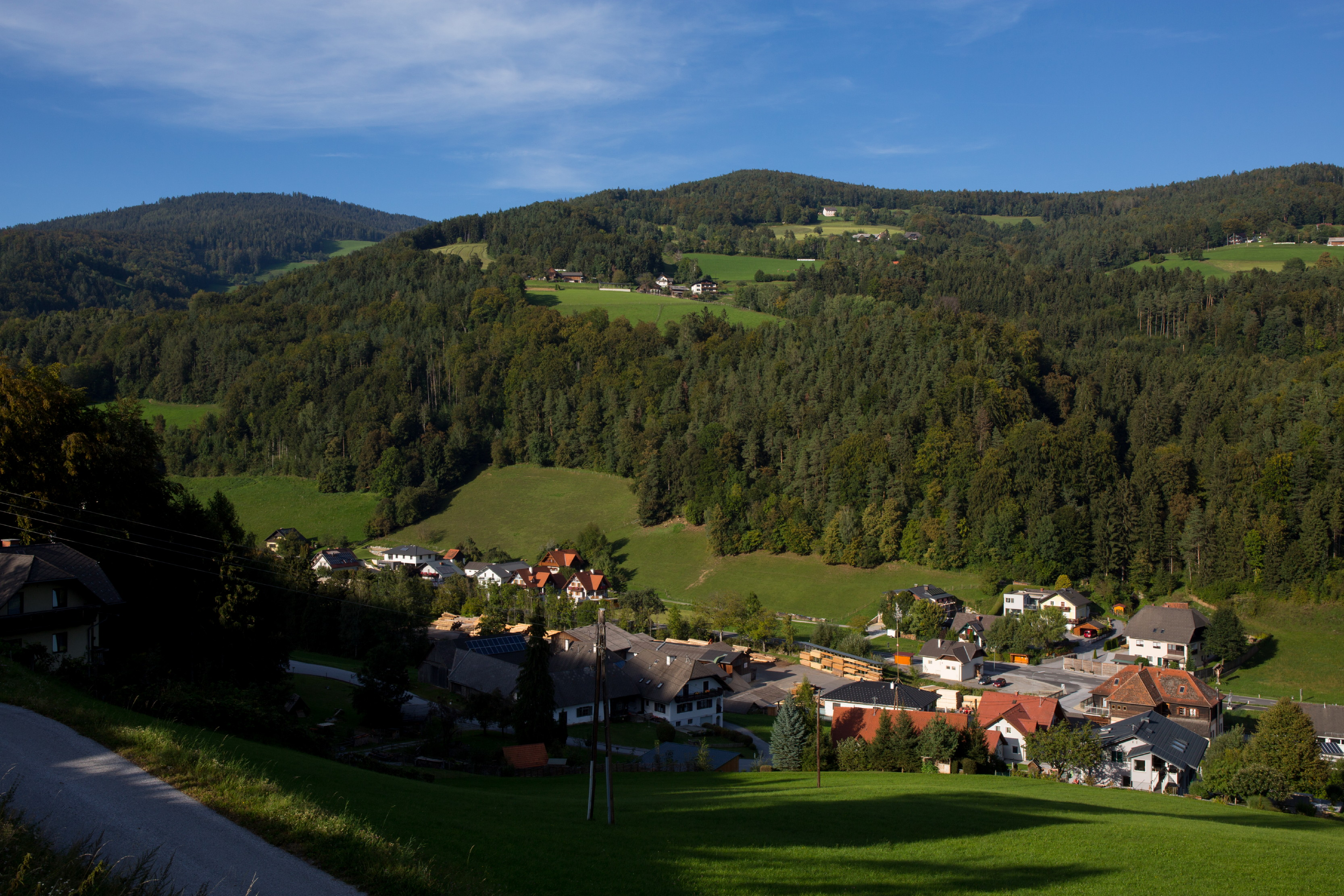

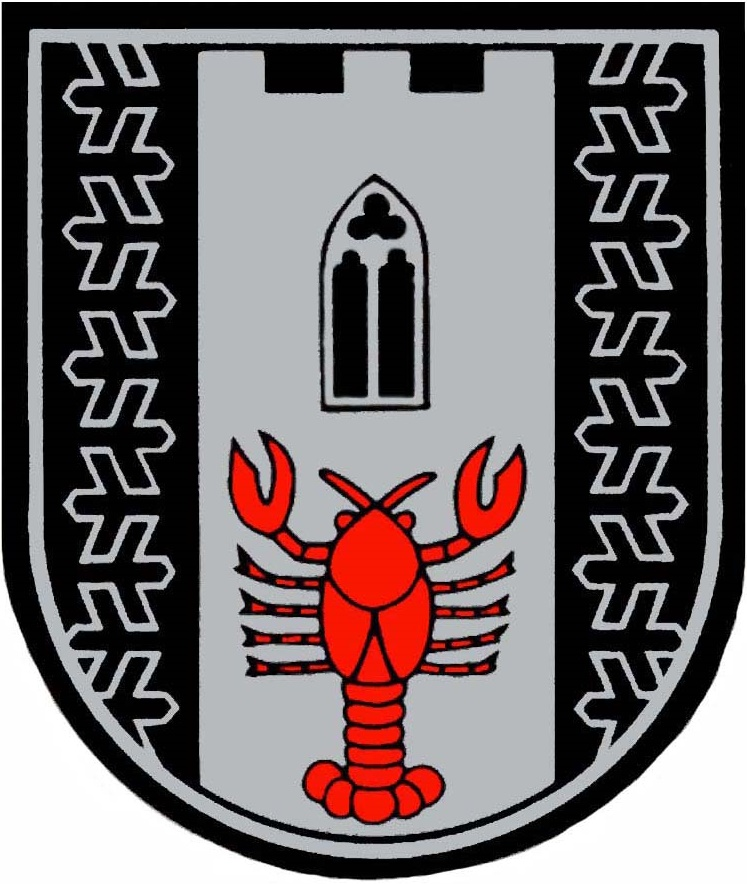
- Coat of arms

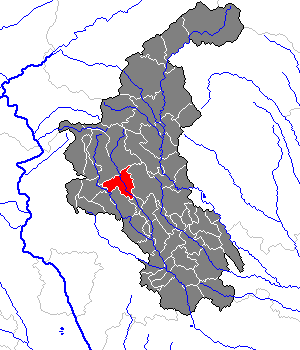
- Location within Weiz district

- Location within Austria
- Coordinates: 47°15′00″N 15°35′40″E
- Country: Austria
- State: Styria
- District: Weiz

Government
  - Mayor: Johann Graf (ÖVP)

Area
  - Total: 20.84 km^{2} (8.05 sq mi)
- Elevation: 400 m (1,300 ft)

Population (2018-01-01)
  - Total: 1,377
  - Density: 66.07/km^{2} (171.1/sq mi)
- Time zone: UTC+1 (CET)
  - Summer (DST): UTC+2 (CEST)
- Postal code: 8160
- Area code: 03172
- Vehicle registration: WZ
- Website: www.naas.steiermark.at

Naas is a municipality in the district of Weiz in the Austrian state of Styria. There are five cadastral communities (Katastralgemeinde) in the area: Affental, Birchbaum, Dürntal, Gschaid bei Weiz, and Naas.
