= Lower Austria =

Coordinates: 48°20′N 15°45′E

Lower Austria Niederösterreich
- State
- Federal State of Lower Austria; Bundesland Niederösterreich (German); Bundeslånd Niedaöstareich (Bavarian); Spolková země Dolní Rakousy (Czech); Spolková krajina Dolné Rakúsko (Slovak)
- Flag Coat of arms
- Anthem: Niederösterreiche Landeshymne
- Country: Austria
- Capital: Sankt Pölten

Government
  - Body: Landtag of Lower Austria
  - Governor: Johanna Mikl-Leitner (ÖVP)
  - Deputy Governors: Udo Landbauer (FPÖ); Stephan Pernkopf (ÖVP)

Area
  - Total: 18,901.2 km^{2} (7,297.8 sq mi)

Population (1 January 2022)
  - Total: 1,698,796
  - Density: 89.8777/km^{2} (232.782/sq mi)

GDP
  - Total: €76.878 billion (2024)
  - Per capita: €44,515 (2024)
- Time zone: UTC+1 (CET)
  - Summer (DST): UTC+2 (CEST)
- ISO 3166 code: AT-3
- HDI (2022): 0.893; very high · 8th of 9
- NUTS Region: AT1
- Votes in Bundesrat: 12 (of 62)
- Website: noe.gv.at

Lower Austria (German: Niederösterreich pronounced [ˈniːdɐˌ(ʔ)øːstɐraɪç], Bavarian: Niedaöstareich, abbreviated LA or NÖ) is one of the nine states of Austria, located in the northeastern corner of the country. Major cities are Amstetten, Krems an der Donau, Wiener Neustadt and Sankt Pölten, which has been the capital of Lower Austria since 1986, replacing Vienna, which became a separate state in 1921. With a land area of 19,186 km^{2} (7,408 sq mi) and a population of 1.7 million people, Lower Austria is the largest and second-most-populous state in Austria (after Vienna).

== Geography ==
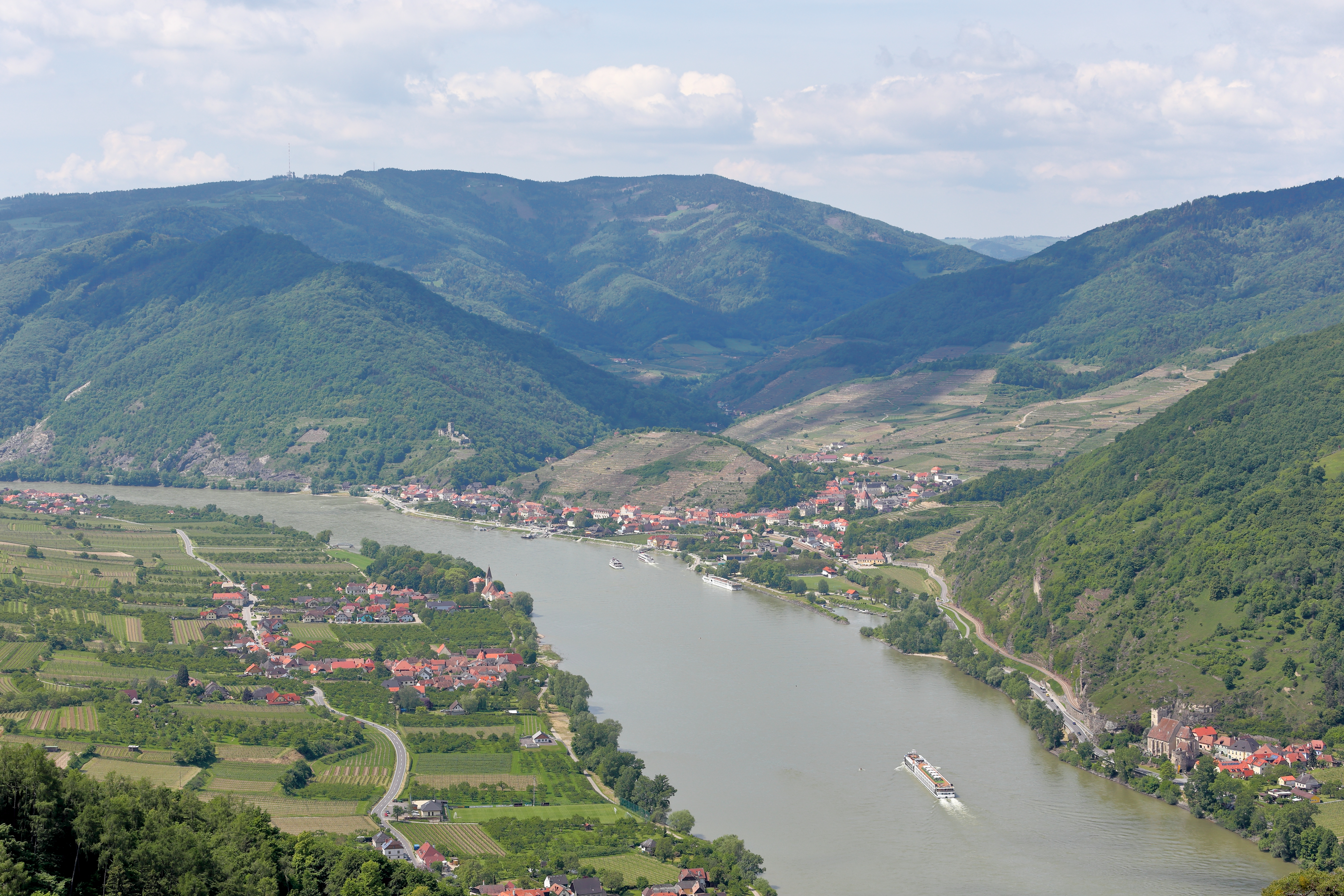
Wachau Valley near Spitz, Austria

With a land area of 19,186 km^{2} (7,408 sq mi) situated east of Upper Austria, Lower Austria is the country's largest state. Lower Austria derives its name from its downriver location on the river Enns, which flows from the west to the east. Lower Austria has an international border, 414 km (257 mi) long, with the Czech Republic (South Bohemia and South Moravia) and Slovakia (Bratislava and Trnava Regions). The state has the second-longest external border of all Austrian states. It also borders the other Austrian states of Upper Austria, Styria and Burgenland as well as surrounding Vienna.

Lower Austria is divided into four regions, known as Viertel (quarters):

- Mostviertel (above the Vienna Woods)
- Industrieviertel (below the Vienna Woods)
- Weinviertel (below the Manhartsberg)
- Waldviertel (above the Manhartsberg)

These regions have different geographical structures. Whilst the Mostviertel is dominated by the foothills of the Limestone Alps with mountains up to 2,000 m (AA) (6,500 ft) high, most of the Waldviertel is a granite plateau. The hilly Weinviertel lies to the northeast, descends to the plains of Marchfeld in the east of the state, and is separated by the Danube from the Vienna Basin to the south, which in turn is separated from the Vienna Woods by a line of thermal springs (the Thermenlinie) running north to south.

=== Mountains ===
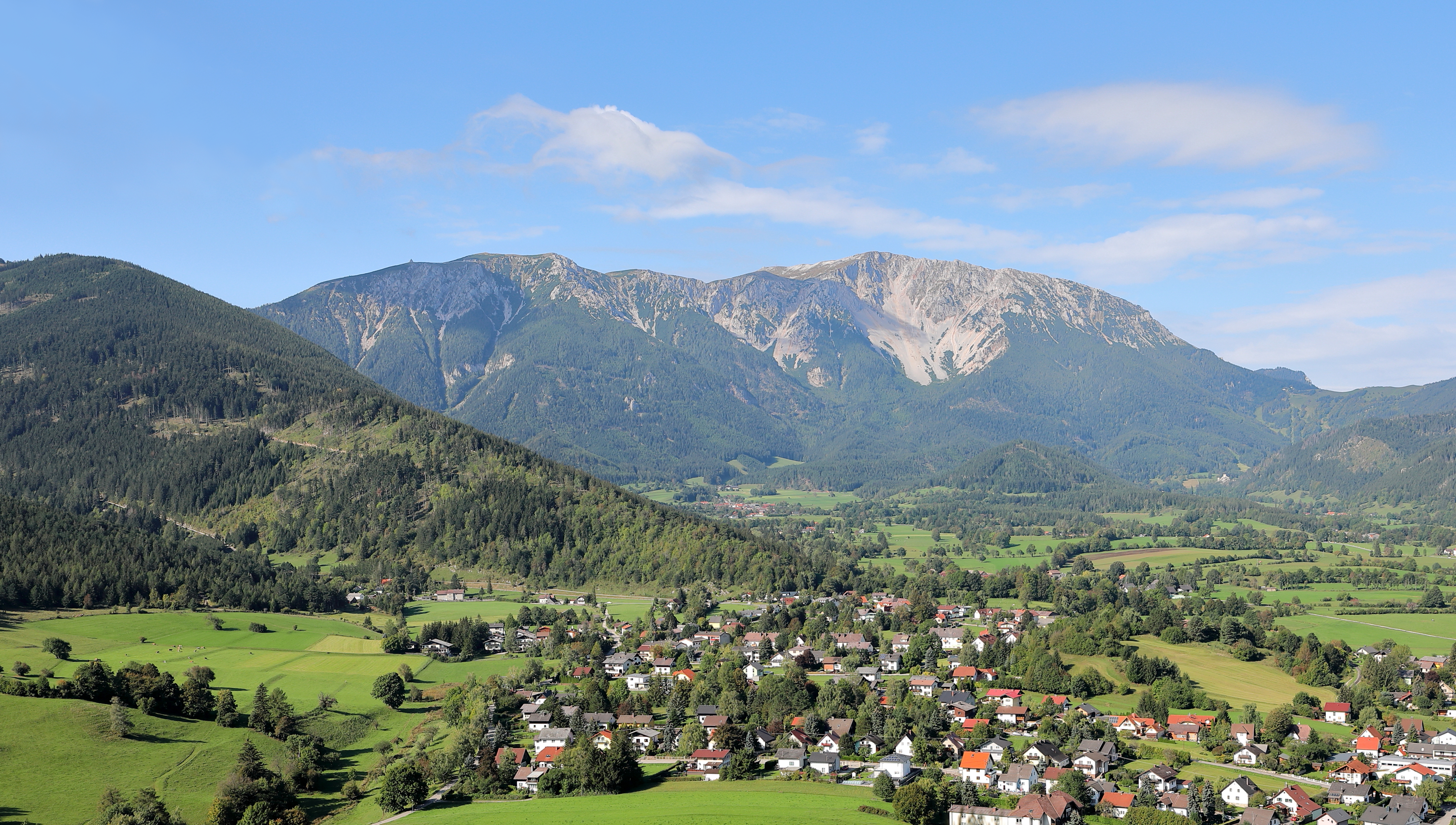
The Schneeberg, one of Vienna's three Hausberge

- Schneeberg (Klosterwappen; 2,076 m)
- Rax (Scheibwaldhöhe; 1,943 m; highest summit: Heukuppe; 2,007 m – Styria)
- Ötscher (1,893 m)
- Dürrenstein (1,878 m)
- Schneealpe (Ameisbühel; 1,828 m; highest summit: Windberg; 1,903 m – Styria)
- Hochkar (1,808 m)
- Gamsstein (1,774 m)
- Stumpfmauer (1,770 m)
- Göller (1,766 m)
- Hochwechsel (1,743 m)
- Gippel (1,669 m)
- Großer Sonnleitstein (1,639 m)
- Großer Zellerhut (1,639 m)
- Gemeindealpe (1,626 m)
- Scheiblingstein (1,622 m) (not to be confused with Scheiblingstein (2,197 m), which is in Styria)
- Drahtekogel (1,565 m)
- Sonnwendstein (1,523 m)
- Obersberg (1,467 m)
- Königsberg (1,452 m)
- Großer Sulzberg (1,400 m)
- Reisalpe (1,399 m)
- Gahns (1,380 m)
- Tirolerkogel (1,377 m)
- Türnitzer Höger (1,372 m)
- Unterberg (1,342 m)
- Traisenberg (1,230 m)
- Dürre Wand (1,222 m)
- Hohenstein (1,195 m)
- Eisenstein (1,185 m)
- Hohe Wand (1,132 m)
- Großer Peilstein (1,061 m)
- Weinsberg (1,041 m)
- Hocheck (1,036 m)
- Nebelstein (1,017 m)
- Eibl (1,007 m)
- Hohe Mandling (967 m)
- Jauerling (961 m)
- Hoher Lindkogel also named Eisernes Tor (834 m)
- Anninger (675 m)
- Buschberg (491 m)

Other mountains in Lower Austria may be found at Category:Mountains of Lower Austria.

=== Alpine passes ===
- Semmering (985 m)
- Wechsel (943 m)

The state border with Styria runs over both passes.

=== Rivers ===
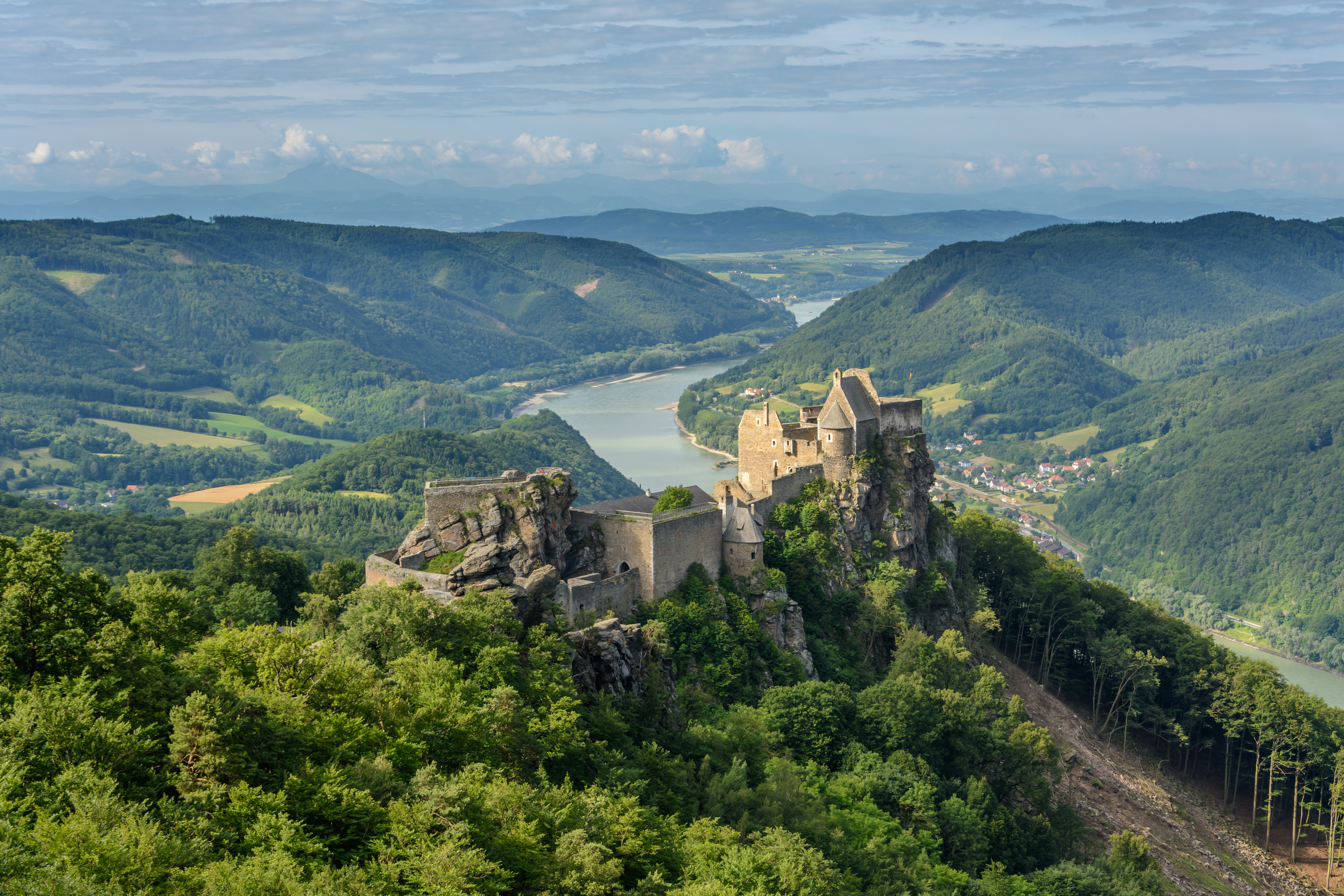
The ruins of Aggstein Castle above the Danube in the Wachau valley

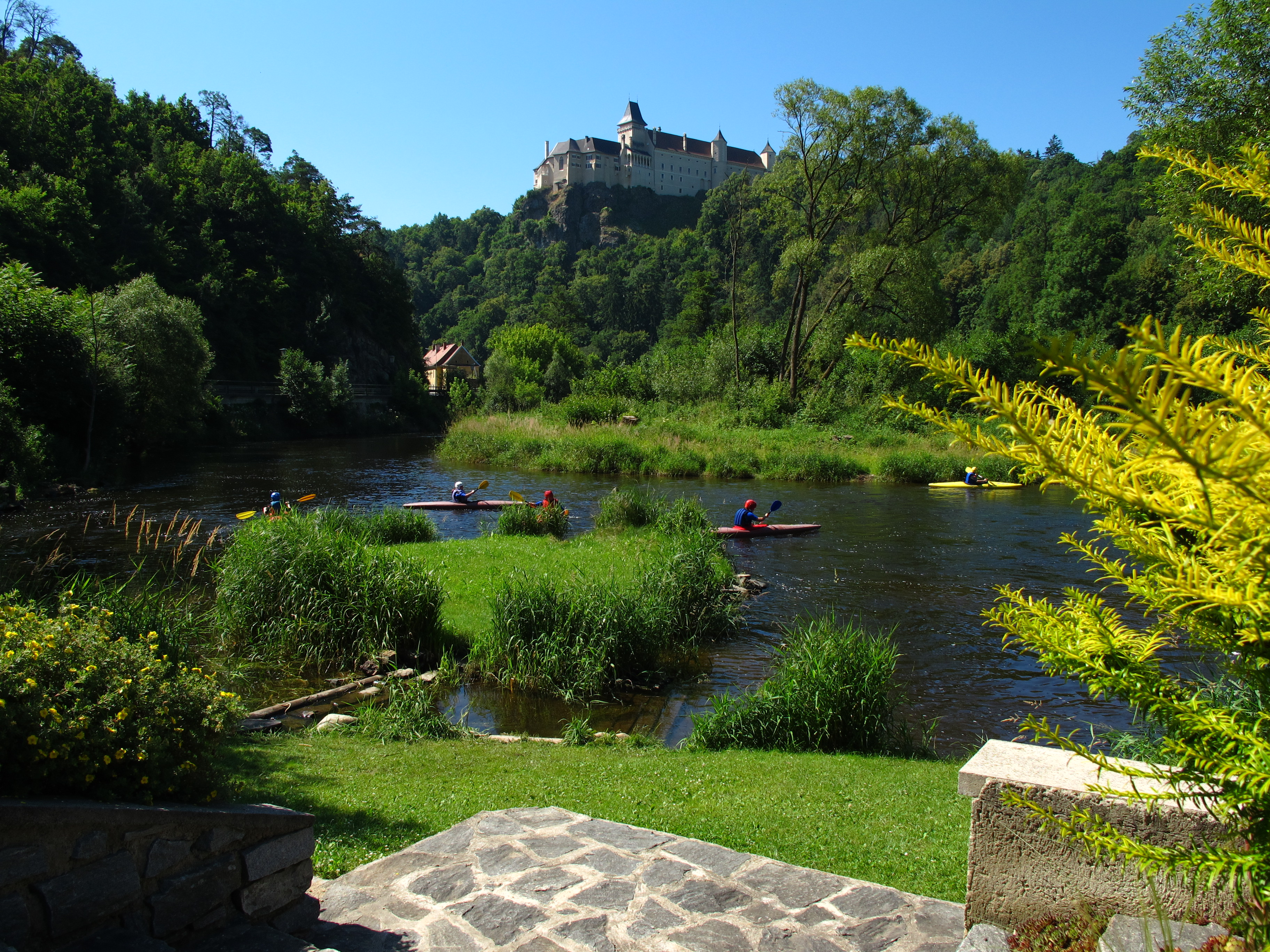
Kamp river below the Rosenburg

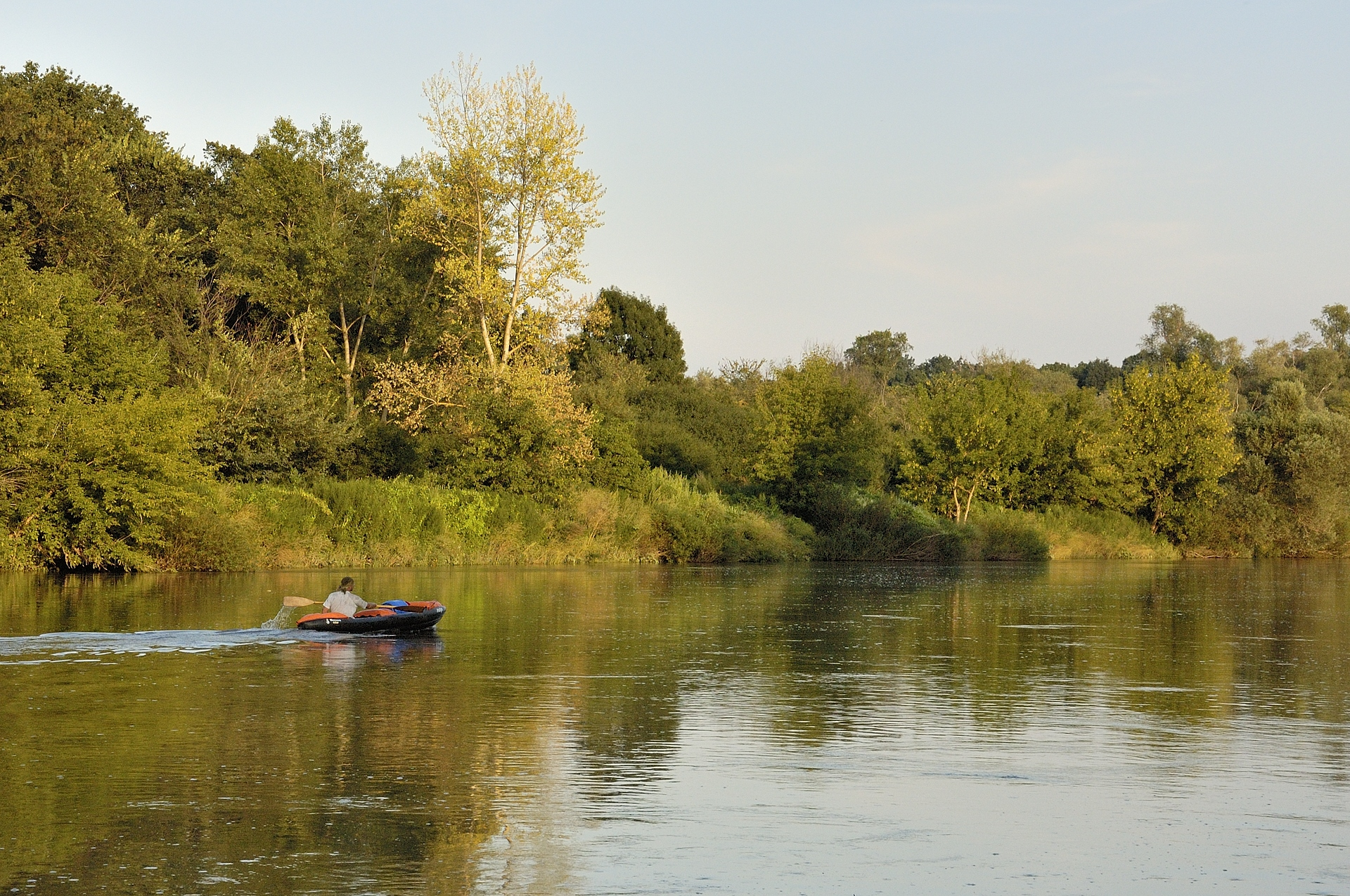
Morava river with riparian forest

Almost all of Lower Austria is drained by the Danube. The only river that flows into the North Sea (via the Vltava and the Elbe) is the Lainsitz in northern Waldviertel.

The most important rivers north of the Danube (on its left bank) are the Ysper, Kamp, Krems, Lainsitz, Morava and Thaya. South of the Danube (on its right bank) are the Enns, Ybbs, Erlauf, Melk, Pielach, Traisen, Schwechat, Fischa, Schwarza, Triesting, Pitten and the Leitha.

=== Lakes ===
- Ottenstein Reservoir (4.3 km^{2})
- Lunzer See (0.69 km^{2})
- Erlaufsee (0.56 km^{2}, of which about half lies in Lower Austria)
- Erlauf Reservoir
- Wienerwaldsee (0.32 km^{2})

=== Caves ===
Lower Austria is rich in natural caves; in all 4,082 have been recorded. Most of the caves have formed in limestone and dolomite rocks and are therefore called karst caves. Cavities also form in the marble of the Central Alps and the Bohemian Massif. Among the largest caves in Lower Austria are:

- Ötscherhöhlensystem (Ötscher): 27,003 m long; union of the Taubenloch and Geldloch
- Pfannloch (Ötscher): 5,287 m long
- Lechnerweidhöhle (Dürrenstein): 5,252 m long
- Trockenes Loch (Schwarzenbach an der Pielach): 4,510 m long
- Hermannshöhle (Kirchberg am Wechsel): 4,430 m long
- Eisensteinhöhle (Bad Fischau): 2,341 m long

The last two are open as show caves, along with the Allander stalactite cave, the Unicorn Cave, the Hochkarschacht, the Nixhöhle and the Ötschertropfsteinhöhle.

=== Land use ===
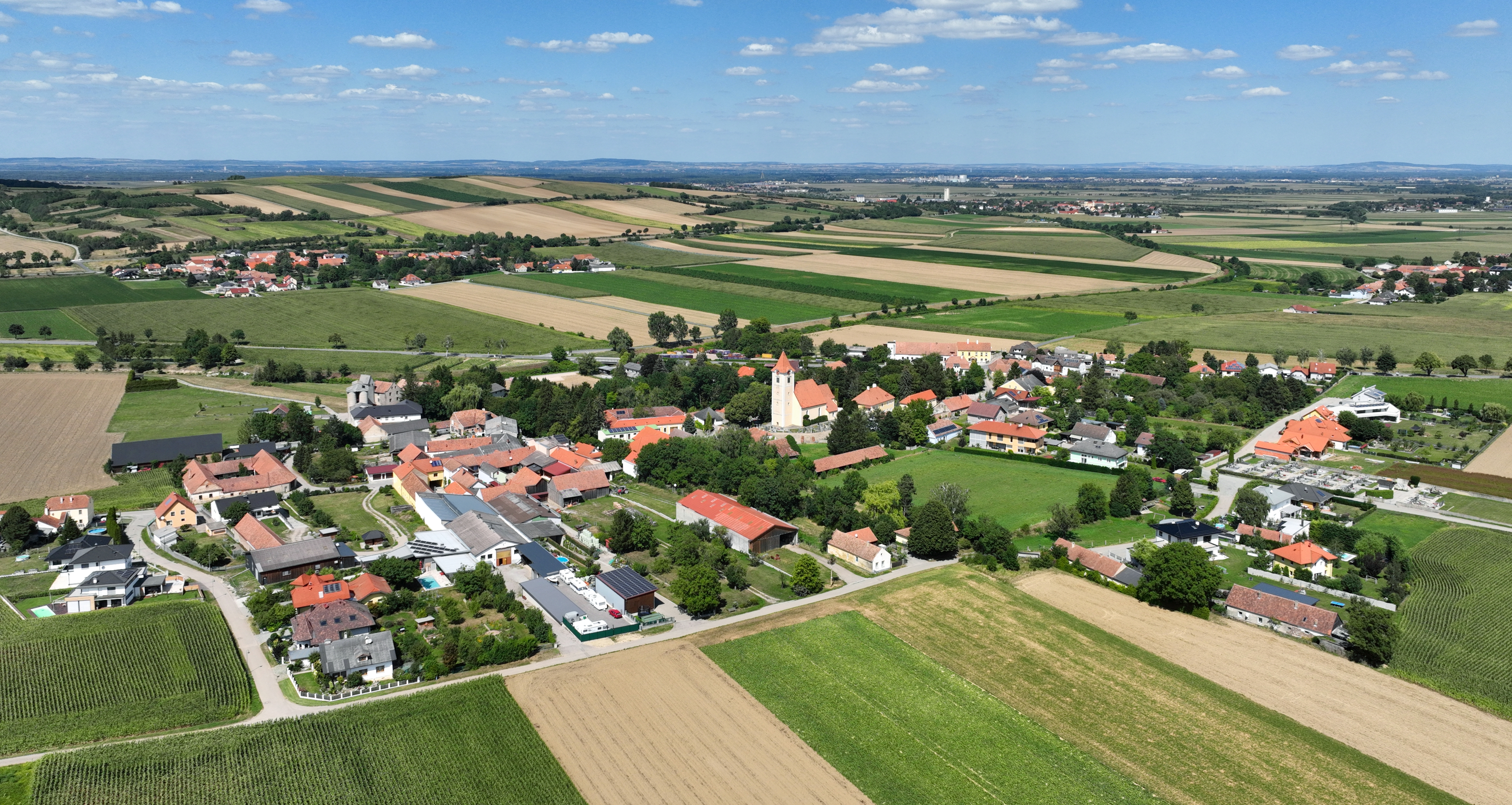
Agricultural land in Lower Austria

Type of land use	Area in km^{2}	Per cent of total area
Farmland	7,000	42
Woods	6,711	40
Grassland	1,750	11
Alpine pastures	300	1.7
Vineyards	315	1.9

== History ==
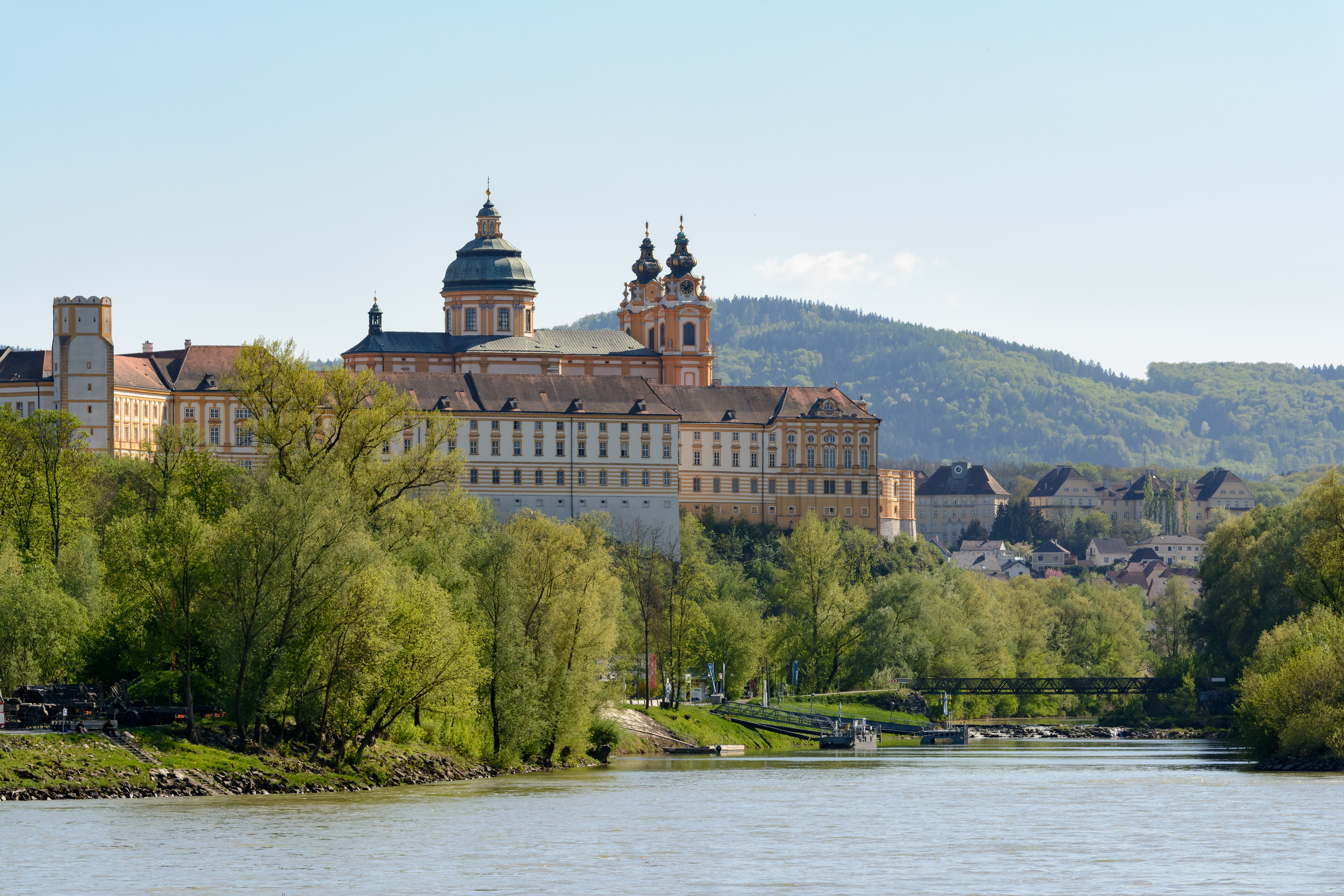
Melk Abbey was founded in 1089. Today's Baroque abbey was built between 1702 and 1736.

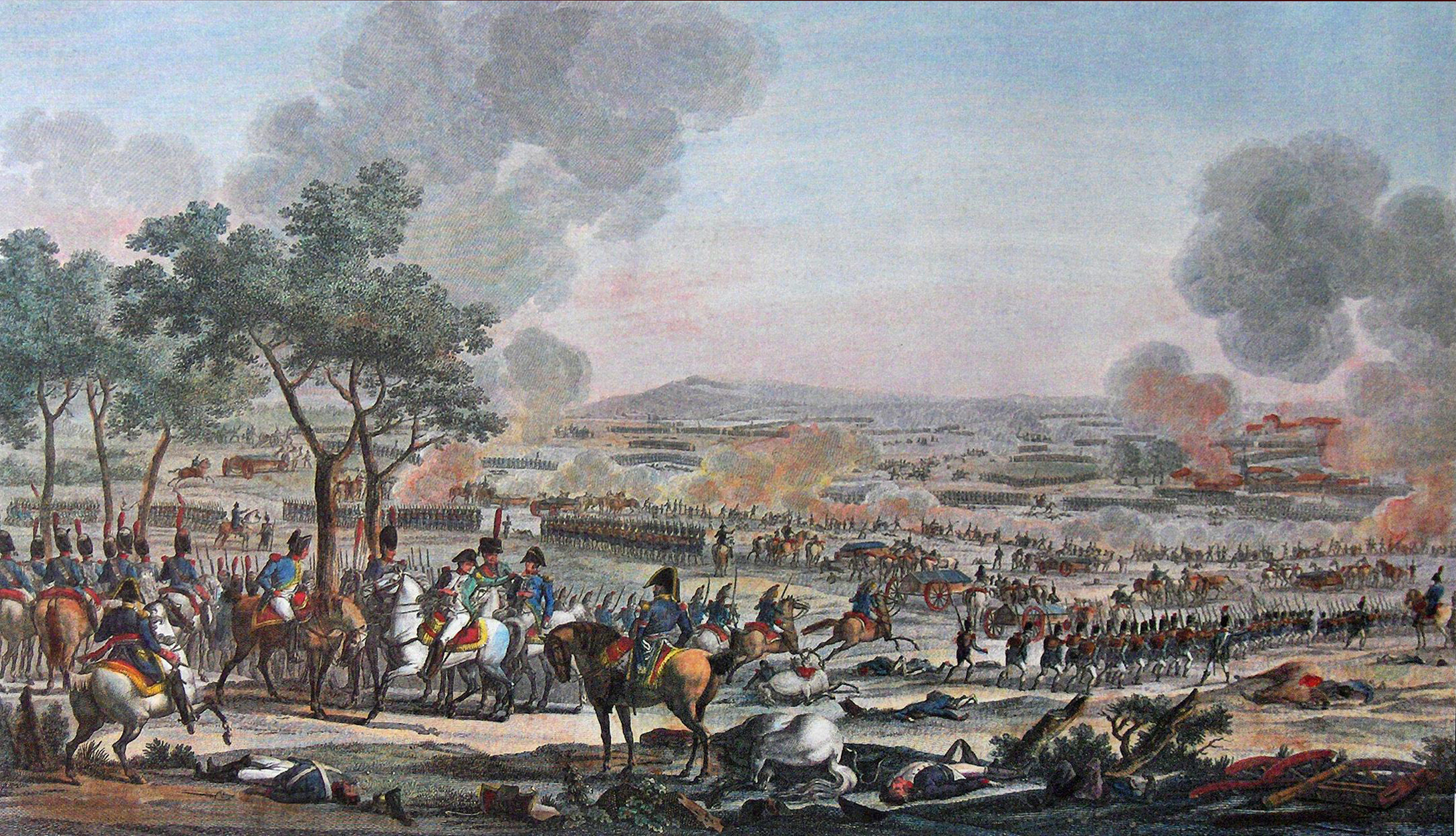
Napoleon at the Battle of Wagram in July 1809

More than 200 Neolithic people were killed during the massacre in the Linear Pottery settlement area of Schletz 7000 years ago.

The history of Lower Austria is very similar to the history of Austria. Many castles are located in Lower Austria. Klosterneuburg Abbey, located here, is one of the oldest abbeys in Austria. Before World War II, Lower Austria had the largest number of Jews in the country.

The names Lower Austria and Upper Austria are derived from the earlier names Austria below the Enns and Austria above the Enns, references to the river Enns. Going down from its source on the northern edge of the Central Eastern Alps, the river crosses Upper Austria, then on its lower reaches forms the boundary between Upper Austria and Lower Austria.

In the mid-13th century, it became known as the Principality below the river Enns (Fürstentum unter der Enns).

The Battle on the Marchfeld on 26 August 1278 marked the beginning of the ascendancy of the House of Habsburg in Austria and Central Europe.

During the Ottoman wars in Europe, Lower Austria was the target of repeated raids by the Tatars and Ottoman Akinji mounted paramilitary units, with many people taken into slavery.

Lower Austria was the site of the Battles of Wagram and Aspern, fought between invading French troops under Napoleon and an Austrian army led by Archduke Charles in 1809.

== Economy ==
The gross domestic product (GDP) of the state was 61.0 billion € in 2018, accounting for 15.8% of Austria's economic output. GDP per capita adjusted for purchasing power was 32,300 €, or 107% of the EU27 average in the same year. Lower Austria is the state with the second-lowest GDP per capita in Austria.

== Transport ==
VOR Logo

=== Public local train and bus transport ===
The state is located in the area of the transport association Verkehrsverbund Ost-Region (VOR).

=== Air transport ===
Air travel to the state is served by Vienna International Airport, which is located in the town of Schwechat, Lower Austria. Some western parts of Lower Austria are also served by the much smaller Linz Airport, while the east is additionally served by Bratislava Airport.

== Demographics ==
Historical population

Year	Pop.	±%
1869	1,077,232	—
1880	1,152,767	+7.0%
1890	1,213,471	+5.3%
1900	1,310,506	+8.0%
1910	1,425,238	+8.8%
1923	1,426,885	+0.1%

Year	Pop.	±%
1934	1,446,675	+1.4%
1939	1,455,373	+0.6%
1951	1,400,471	−3.8%
1961	1,374,012	−1.9%
1971	1,420,816	+3.4%
1981	1,427,849	+0.5%

Year	Pop.	±%
1991	1,473,813	+3.2%
2001	1,545,804	+4.9%
2011	1,614,693	+4.5%
2021	1,698,951	+5.2%
2025	1,727,514	+1.7%

Source: Censuses

== Administrative divisions ==
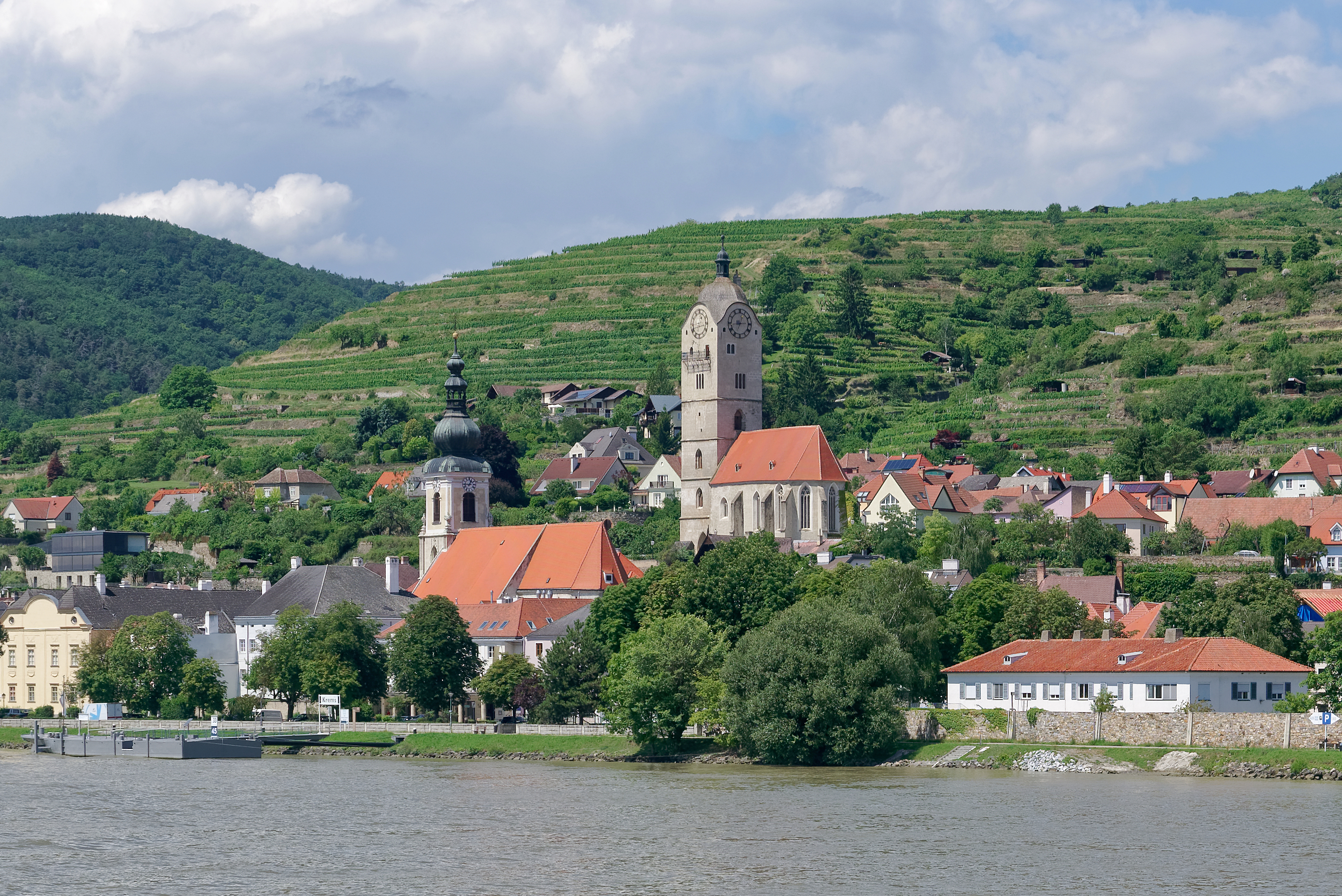
View of Krems (at the end of Wachau valley); Danube river in the centre

Lower Austria is divided into four regions: Mostviertel, Industrieviertel, Weinviertel and Waldviertel. The Wachau valley, situated between Melk and Krems in the Mostviertel region, is famous for its landscape, culture, and wine.

Administratively, the state is divided into 20 districts (Bezirke), and four independent towns (Statutarstädte). In total, there are 573 municipalities within Lower Austria.

Map of Lower Austria showing the districts and the four quarters (Mostviertel in yellow, Industrieviertel in blue, Weinviertel in red and Waldviertel in green)

=== Independent towns ===
- Krems an der Donau
- Sankt Pölten
- Waidhofen
- Wiener Neustadt

=== Districts ===
- Amstetten
- Baden
- Bruck an der Leitha
- Gänserndorf
- Gmünd
- Hollabrunn
- Horn
- Korneuburg
- Krems
- Lilienfeld
- Melk
- Mistelbach
- Mödling
- Neunkirchen
- St. Pölten
- Scheibbs
- Tulln an der Donau
- Waidhofen an der Thaya
- Wiener Neustadt
- Zwettl
