= Hohe Wand (mountain) =

Mountain ridge in Lower Austria

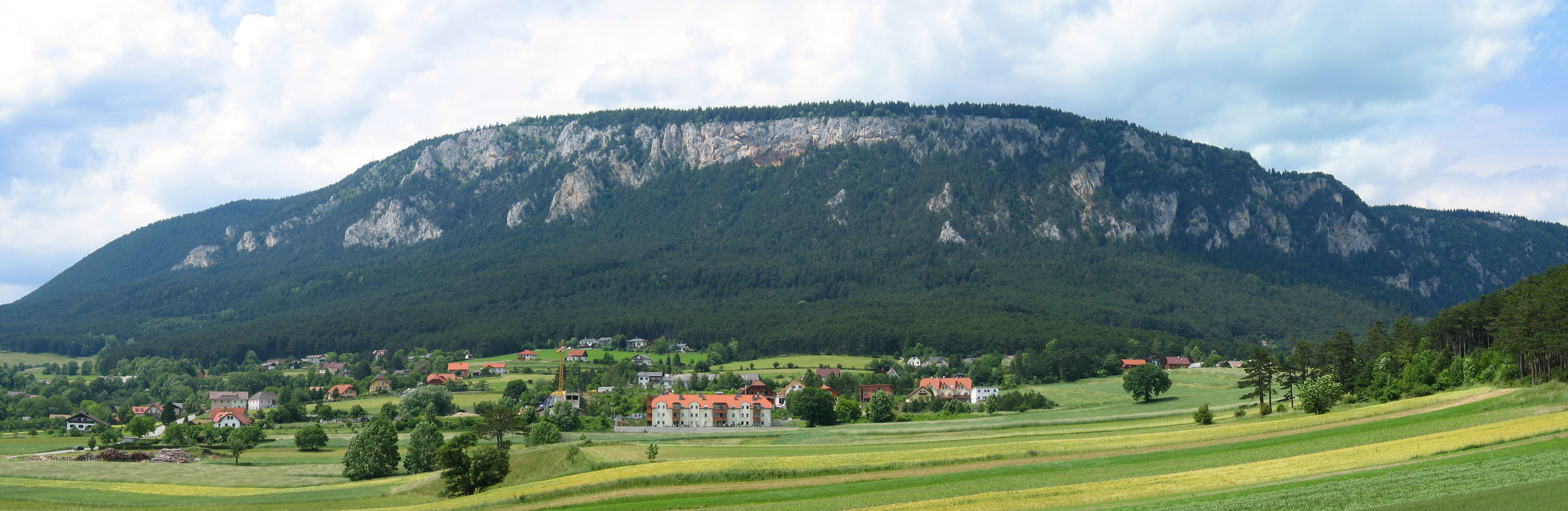
- The western part of the Hohe Wand with its steep rock faces dropping away to the south. In the centre, the Hochfallwand.

Highest point
- Elevation: 1,132 m (AA) (3,714 ft)
- Coordinates: 47°50′02″N 16°02′53″E

Geography
- Location within Austria
- Location: Niederösterreich (Austria)
- Parent range: Gutenstein Alps

Geology
- Rock age: 220 Ma (Obertrias)
- Mountain type(s): Kalk, Dolomit

The Hohe Wand is a mountain ridge in Lower Austria and is part of the Gutenstein Alps. It lies west of Steinfeld in the Vienna Basin; its highest peak (the Plackles) attains a height of 1,132 m. It is one of Vienna's Hausberge.

== General ==
It derives its name, which means "High Wall", from the steep rock faces on its south and southeast side. The high plateau is about 8 km long and stretches from the area of the Plackles peak in the southwest to the so-called Wandeck in the northeast.

The plateau of the Hohe Wand may be accessed over a toll road built in 1931/32 that branches off the road between Stollhof and Maiersdorf. From 1965 until it was dismantled in 1994 there was also a double chairlift from Grünbach to the Plackles summit. Easy, but little used, hiking trail runs from the Dürnbach valley, from Grünbach and from the "rear side", from Miesenbach, up the mountain. Most of the climbs on the southern and southeastern sides are more challenging, requiring sure-footedness and, in places a head for heights. In this area are most of the over 700 climbing routes of all levels of difficulty; there are also numerous Klettersteigs.

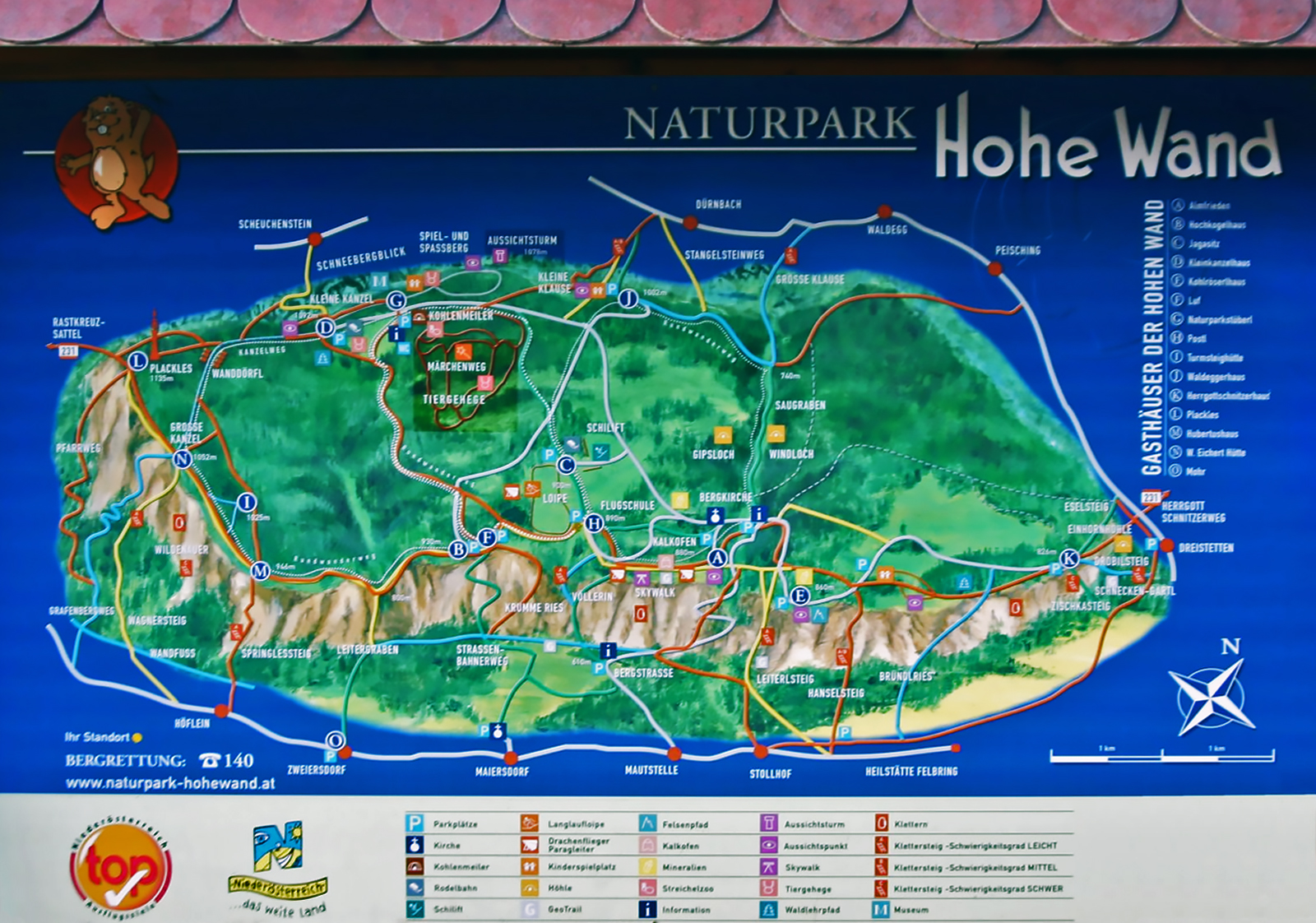
Overview map of the Hohe Wand Nature Park

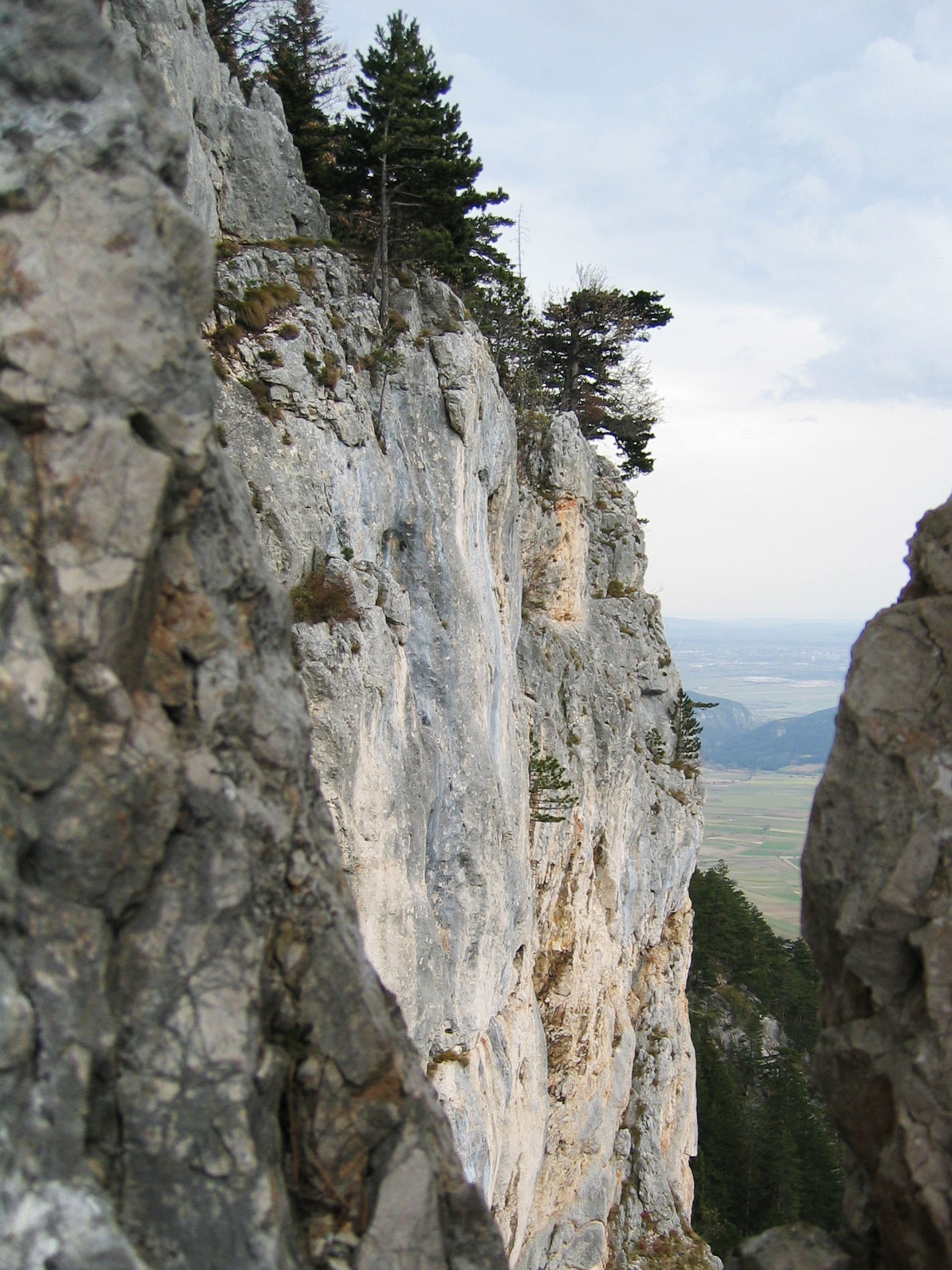
The Hochfallwand rock face on the south side of the Hohe Wand, seen from Wildenauersteig

There are 225 caves in the area of the Hohe Wand. The Unicorn Cave near Dreistetten is accessible to the public as a show cave.

Due to its location on the edge of the Vienna Basin and its accessibility by car, there are 3 popular take-off points on the Hohe Wand for paragliders and hang gliders. The most popular of these is the eastern one, the Oststartplatz, the most challenging and the one most used by hang gliders is the southern one, the Südstartplatz; there is also the less used Almfrieden Startplatz. The Hohe Wand is especially suitable for flying due to its south-to-east wind situations and is also the local mountain for the Viennese.

On the plateau there is a large number of mountain inns and Alpine huts, but also numerous weekend houses, especially in Wanddörfl.

Part of the Hohe Wand has been placed under protection as the Hohe Wand Nature Park, but the name is used to market tourist attractions, some of which have been heavily criticised as being incompatible with a nature park (e.g. the "Skywalk" observation platform that juts out from the rocks).

== Popular easy hiking routes ==
The following paths and climbs are listed in order beginning from those southwest of the Hohe Wand (the southern end of the rock faces) then via the mainly eastwards oriented rock faces, the north and northwest and back to the southwest (i.e. anti-clockwise).

- Pfarrersteig
- Grafenbergweg
- Wagnersteig
- Springlessteig
- Leitergraben
- Straßenbahnerweg
- Krumme Ries (from Maiersdorf "Maier´s village")
- Völlerinsteig
- Leiterlsteig
- Drobilsteig
- Einhornhöhlenweg "Unicorn Cave - Route"
- Waldeggersteig (Große Klause)
- Krumme Ries (Kleine Klause)

== Popular Klettersteige (Via ferrata) ==
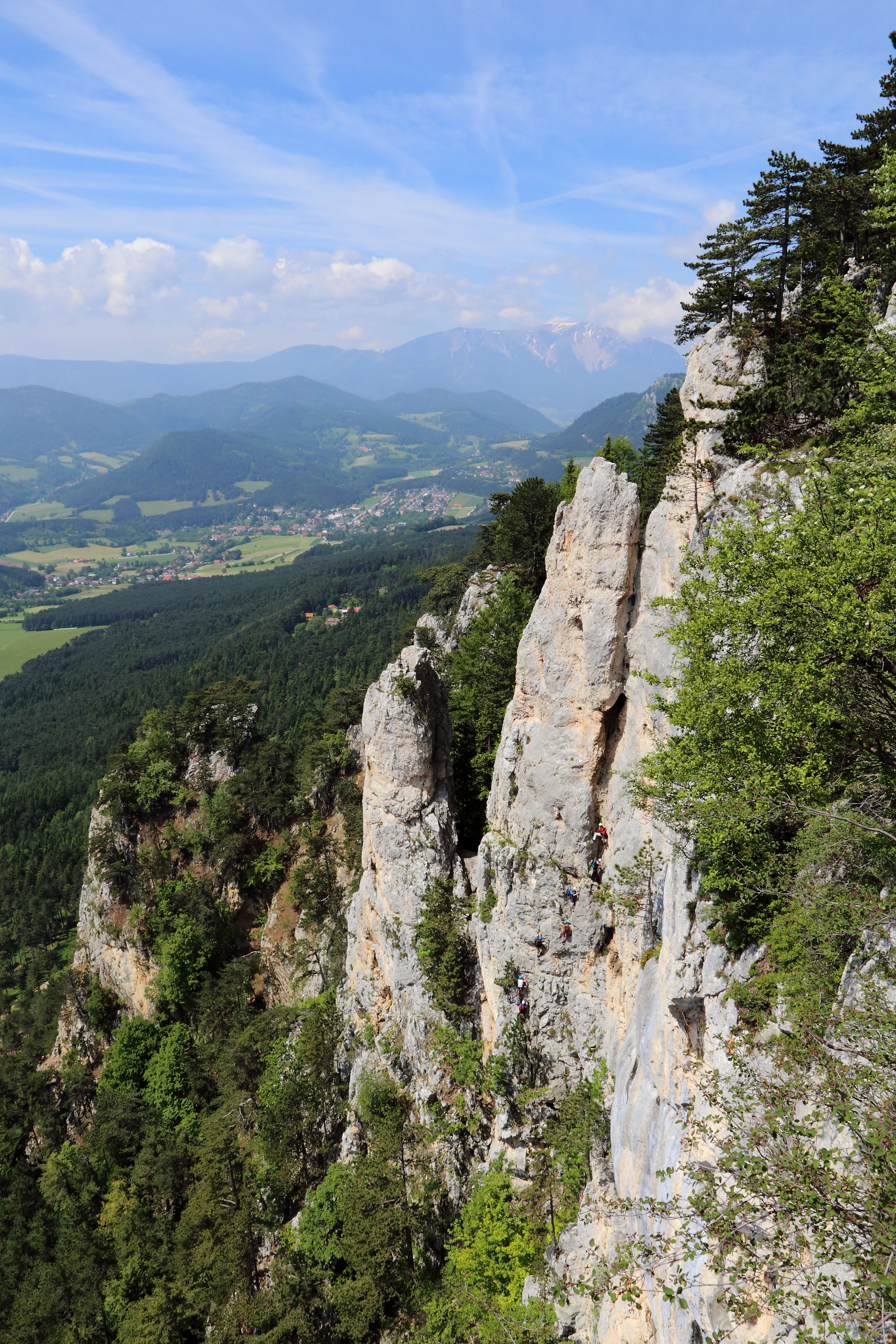
Wildenauersteig between Wildenauertower and Hochfallwall

- Blutspur
- Drobilsteig
- Frauenluckensteig
- Ganghofersteig
- Hanselsteig
- HTL-Steig
- Kammerlingsteig
- Leiterlsteig
- Naturfreundesteig (Kleine Klause)
- Springlessteig
- Steirerspur
- Völlerinsteig
- Wagnersteig
- Währingersteig
- Waldeggersteig (Große Klause)
- Wildenauersteig

== Popular climbing routes ==
- Austriasteig
- A-Steig
- direct Sonnenuhrwand
- Draschgrat
- Fredsteig
- Freundschaftssteig
- Grafenbergsteig
- Kanzelsteig
- Postlgrat
- Reineke Fuchs
- Tirolersteig
- Totenköpflsteig
- Turmsteig
- Weningersteig
- Wienersteig

== Popular Klettergärten (Climbing garden) ==
- Almfriedenwände
- Baumgartnerturm
- Milak-Klettergarten
- obere und untere Naglplatte
- ÖTK-Klettergarten

== Huts ==
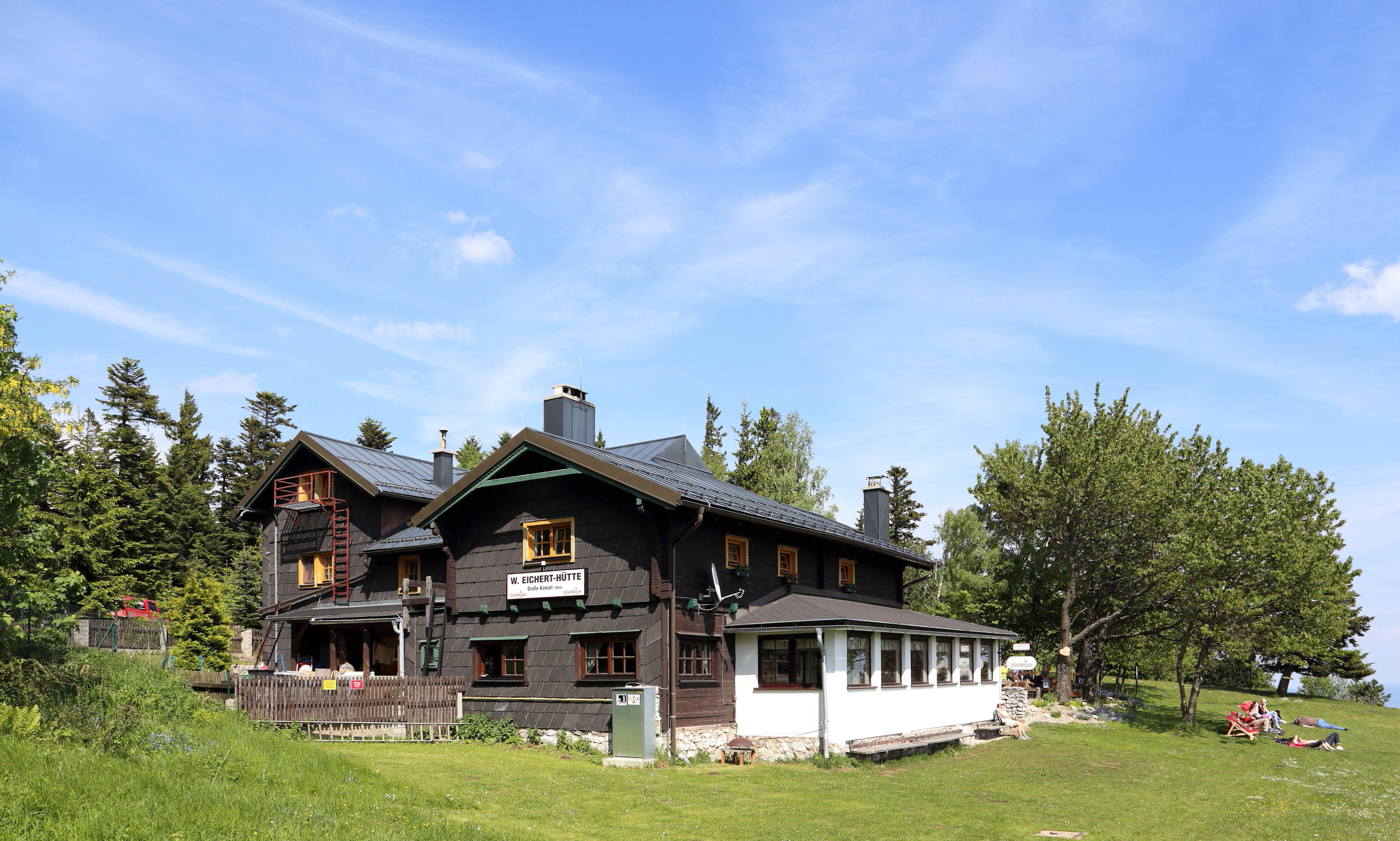
Wilhelm Eichert Hut

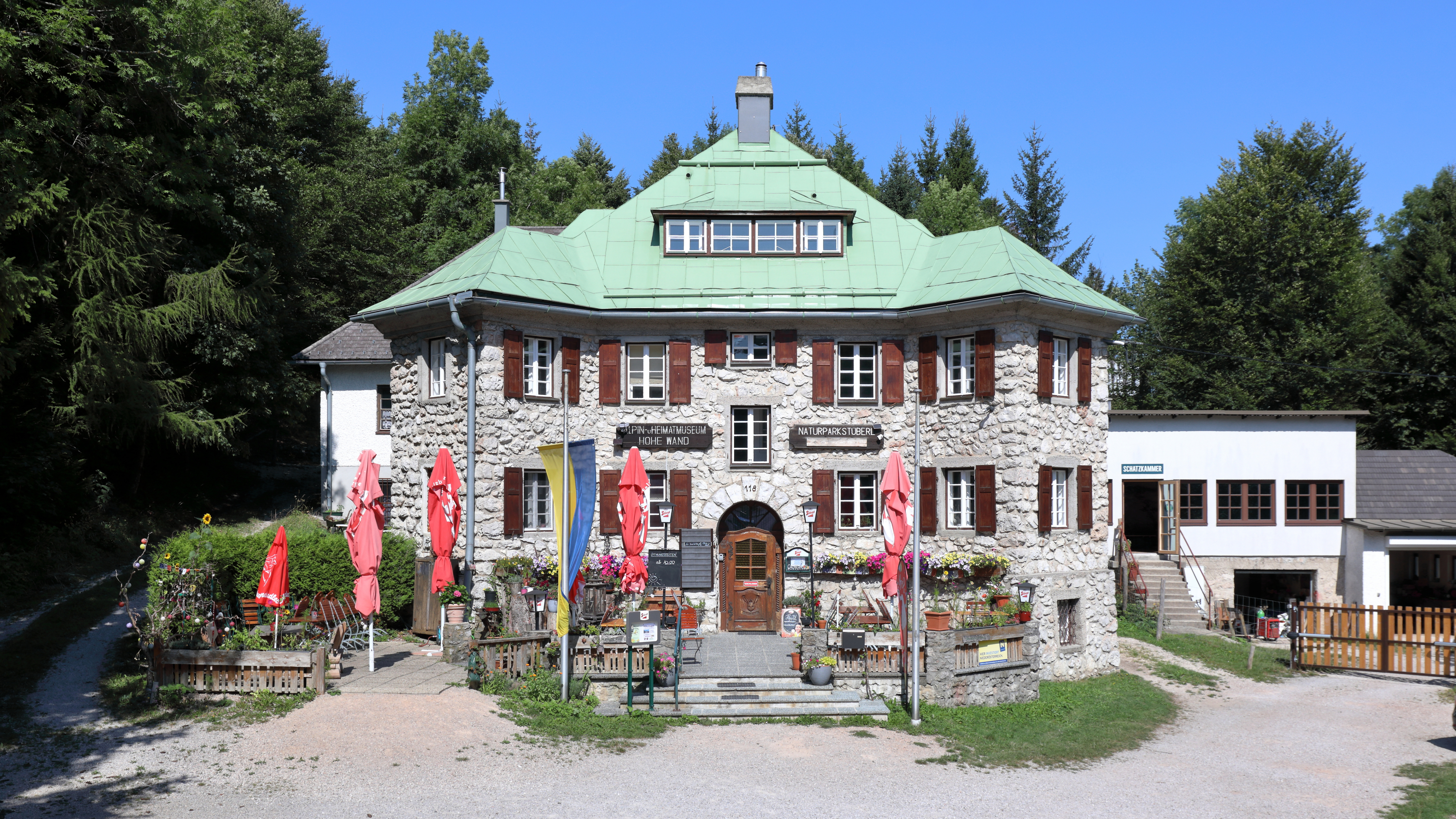
The former Wiener Neustädter Haus; currently a museum with the restaurant "Naturparkstüberl"

- Gasthaus auf dem Geländ (1023 m), formerly TVN, now private
- Berghaus Plackles (1132 m), private
- Wilhelm Eichert Hut (1052 m), ÖTK
- Turmsteig Hut (1000 m), privat
- Hubertushaus (946 m), ÖGV
- Hochkogelhaus (932 m), TVN
- Alpengasthof Postl (892 m), private
- Herrgottschnitzerhaus (826 m), formerly Alpine Gesellschaft „D'Herrgottschnitzer“ (Wien), now private
- Wiener Neustädter Haus (1035 m), formerly TVN, now private
- Kohlröserlhaus (900 m), private
- Stützpunkt der Berg- und Naturwacht
- Gasthof Jagasitz (Haslinger), closed
- Seiser Toni
- Klein-Kanzel-Haus (1092 m), private
- Sepp-Steinwender-Hut
- Dr.-Ferdinand-Nagl-Haus ÖTV
- Hohe-Wand-Naturfreundehaus (1050 m), TVN
- Scheimhut am Rastkreuzsattel, between Geländ and Hoher Wand.
- Waldegger Haus (1002 m)
- Turmsteighütte (1000 m), private
- Gasthaus Luf
- Kohlröserlhaus (900 m), privat
- Gasthaus Almfrieden
- Hanselsteighaus, closed
- Imbissstand near entry of Einhornhöhle "Unicorn Cave (Austria)|Unicorn Cave"

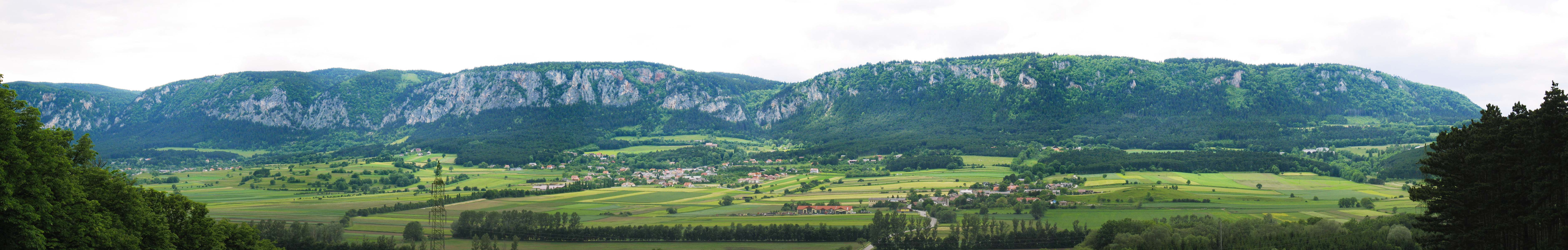
The southeastern part of the Hohe Wand. The toll road runs over the mountain ridge (in the centre), but is hidden behind trees.
