= Vienna Hausberge =

Austrian mountains

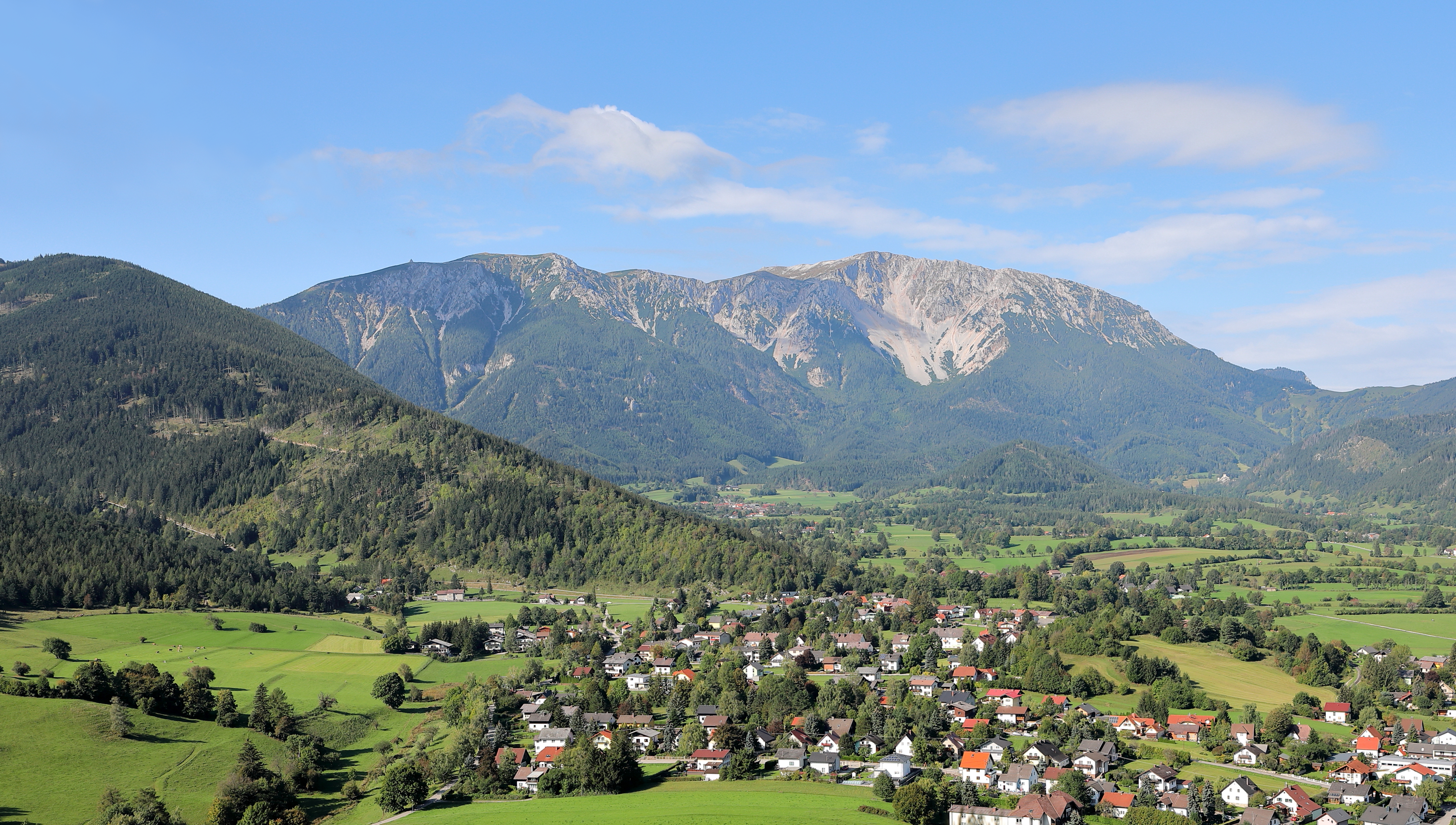
The Schneeberg, one of Vienna's three Hausberge

Vienna's Hausberge (German: Wiener Hausberge) are the mountains of Raxalpe, Schneeberg and Hohe Wand in the south of the state of Lower Austria. These mountains may be reached from Vienna in about an hour and are therefore a popular recreation area for the Viennese.

== Accessibility ==
The Viennese Hausberge - a Hausberg is a local mountain associated with a town or city - may be reached by car on the Southern Autobahn (A2). There are also good public transport links between Vienna and the mountains. For the Raxalpe, the visitor can catch a train on the Southern Railway to Payerbach-Reichenau, then a Retter bus to Hirschwang, Hinternaßwald or the Preiner Gscheid. For the Schneeberg, Southern Railway trains run to Wr. Neustadt, then the visitor can catch a diesel railcar on the Schneebergbahn to Puchberg and continue on the rack railway up the Hochschneeberg or catch a train to Neunkirchen and the Retter bus to Losenheim. For the Hohe Wand, visitors may also take the train to Wr. Neustadt and continue by bus (operated by Partsch) to Maiersdorf or Stollhof.

== Historic development ==
With the construction of the Semmering Railway this region became popular with day trippers from Vienna. Tourist traffic initially flocked to the Rax and Schneeberg mountains which were easier to get to and were accessible by a cable car and a rack railway. Before mass tourism arrived, many of the visitors were botanists, mineralogists, geographers and agronomists, who took to wandering in the mountains because of their specialism, their reports fascinating citizens of the Biedermeier period, who hitherto had been restricted to day trips in the immediate vicinity of Vienna, to places like the Vienna Woods. The first record of an unofficial climb of the Hohe Wand dates to the year 1862. Alpine clubs were founded and built refuge huts on the high plateau.

== Today ==
The Rax, Schneeberg and Hohe Wand are still the most popular mountains in the Gutenstein Alps and the Rax-Schneeberg Group, and they are very well served, with easy access, good viewing points and numerous waymarked footpaths. By contrast, other mountains such as the Dürre Wand or Schneealpe are less often climbed.

== Literature ==
- Karl Flanner: Die Hohe Wand. Menschen - Arbeit - Touristen.
