= Joseph Heicke =

Austrian artist (1811–1861)

- Born: 12 March 1811; Vienna, Imp.-R. Austria
- Died: 6 November 1861 (aged 50); Vienna, Imp.&R. Austria

Joseph Heicke, Josef Heicke (Josef Heike; Hungarian: Heicke József, Heike József; 12 March 1811 – 6 November 1861), was an Austrian painter and lithographer, producing landscapes, portraits, natural history water-colours and images of historic events.

He studied at the Vienna Academy and travelled in the Middle East, Italy and Hungary.

His art shows the influence of Friedrich Gauermann. His works can be found in Austrian and Italian collections.

== Gallery ==
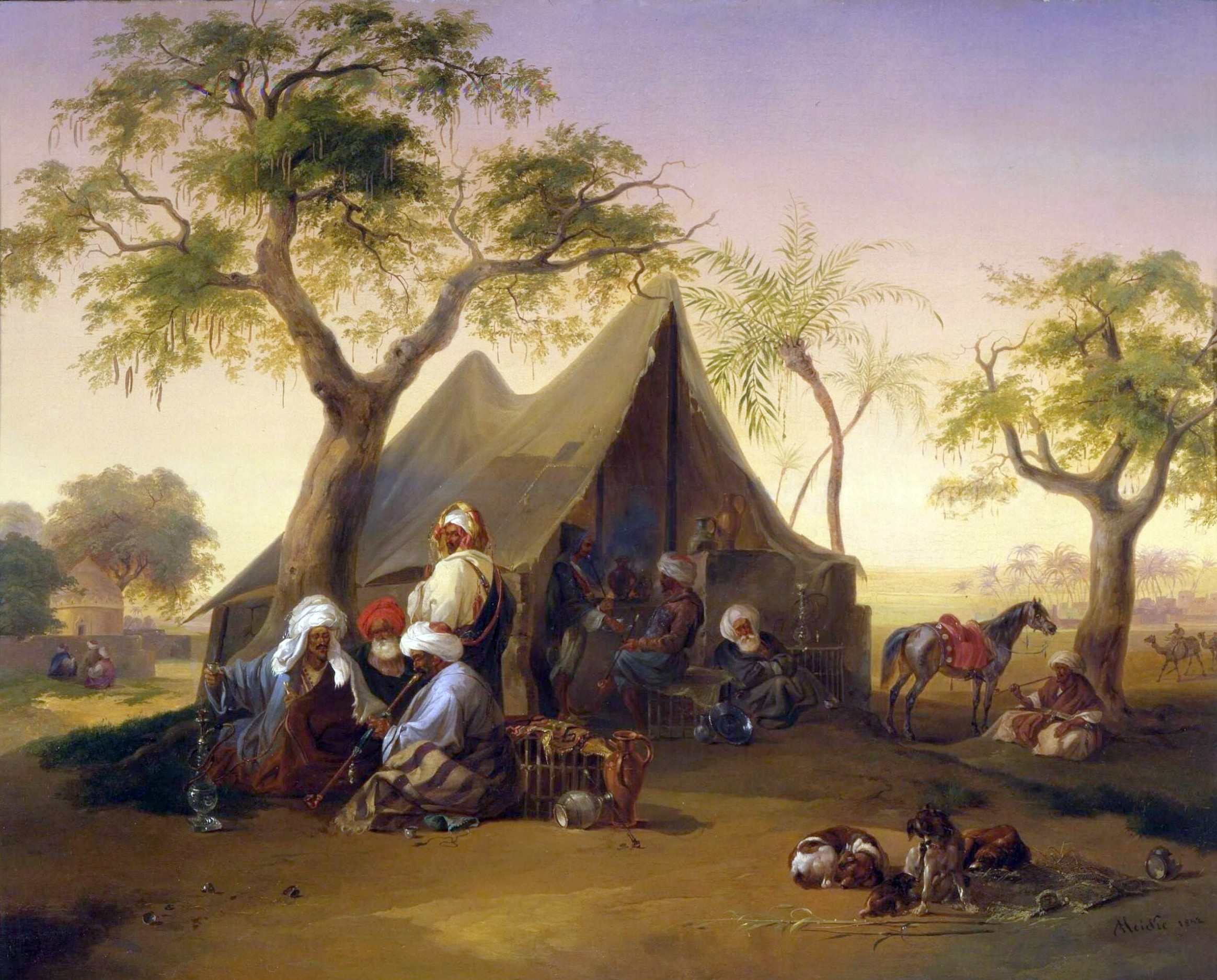
Arabs Drinking Coffee in Front of a Tent

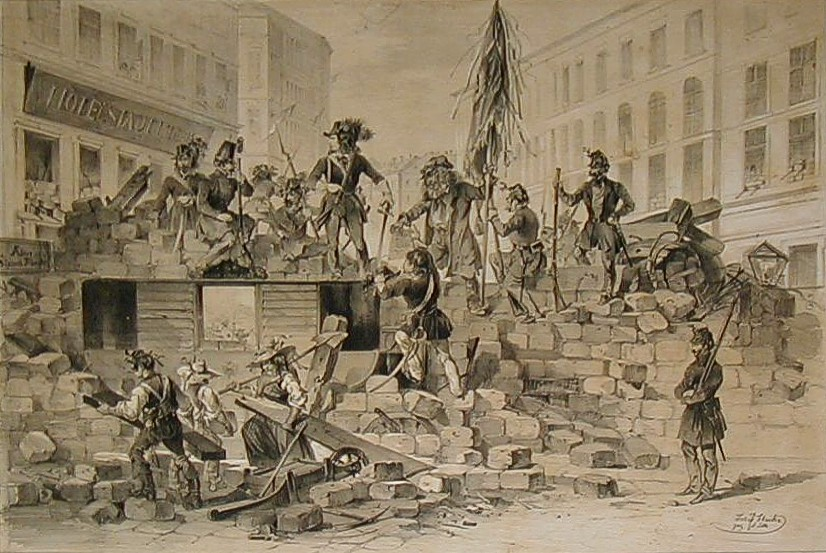
Street barricade 26 May 1848, Vienna

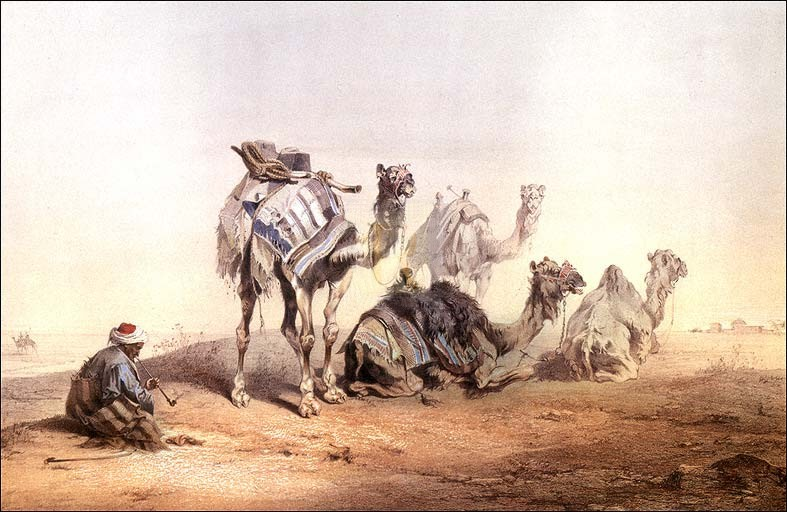
Middle East scene

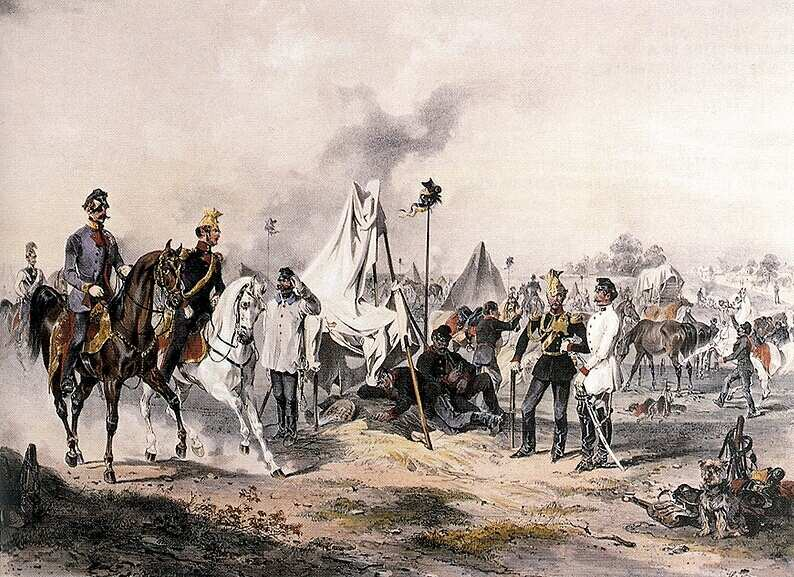
Count Franz von Schlick on battlefield during the Hungarian Revolution of 1848
