= Hohe Wand Nature Park =

Coordinates: 47.834°N 16.048°E

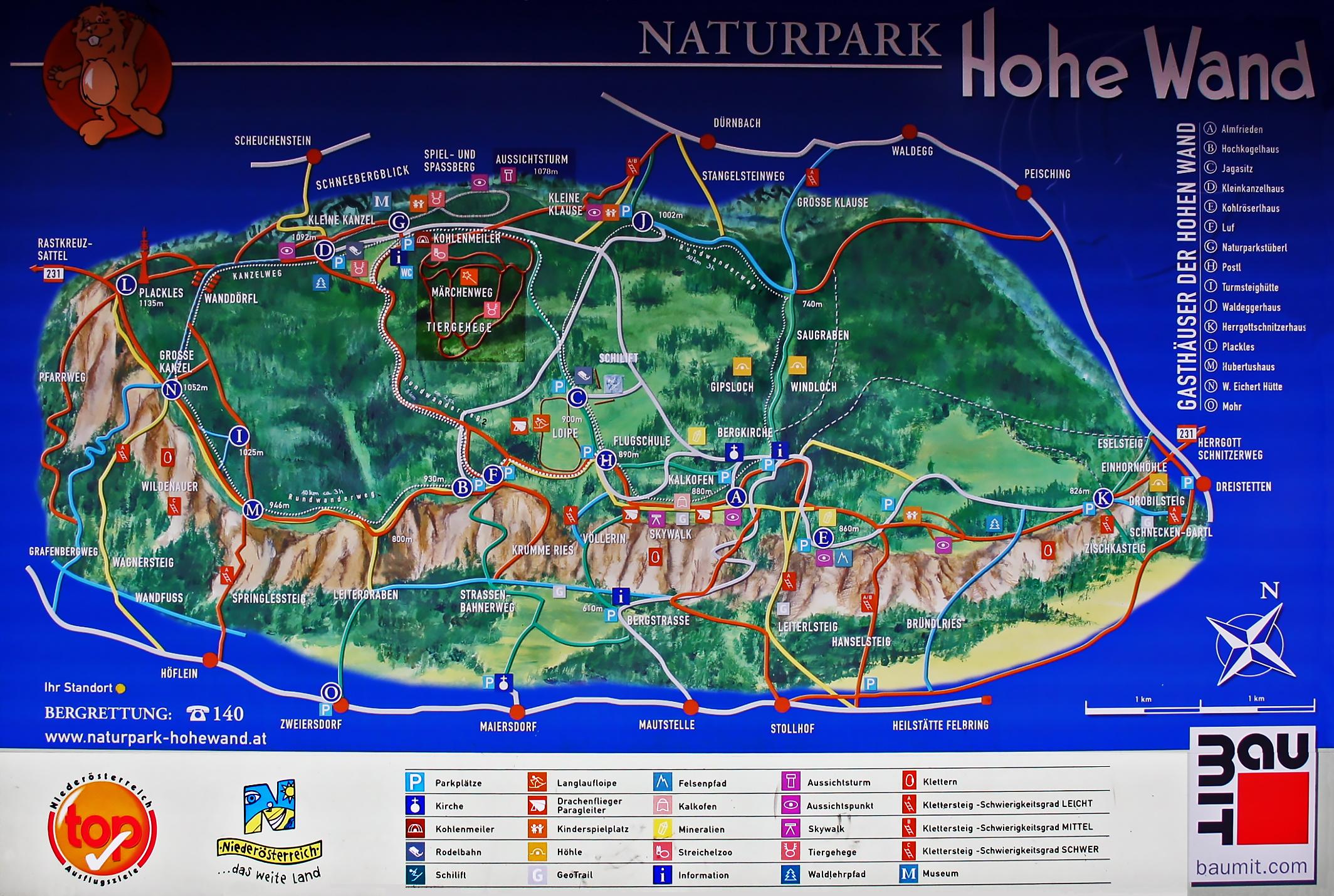
Hohe Wand Nature Park overview map

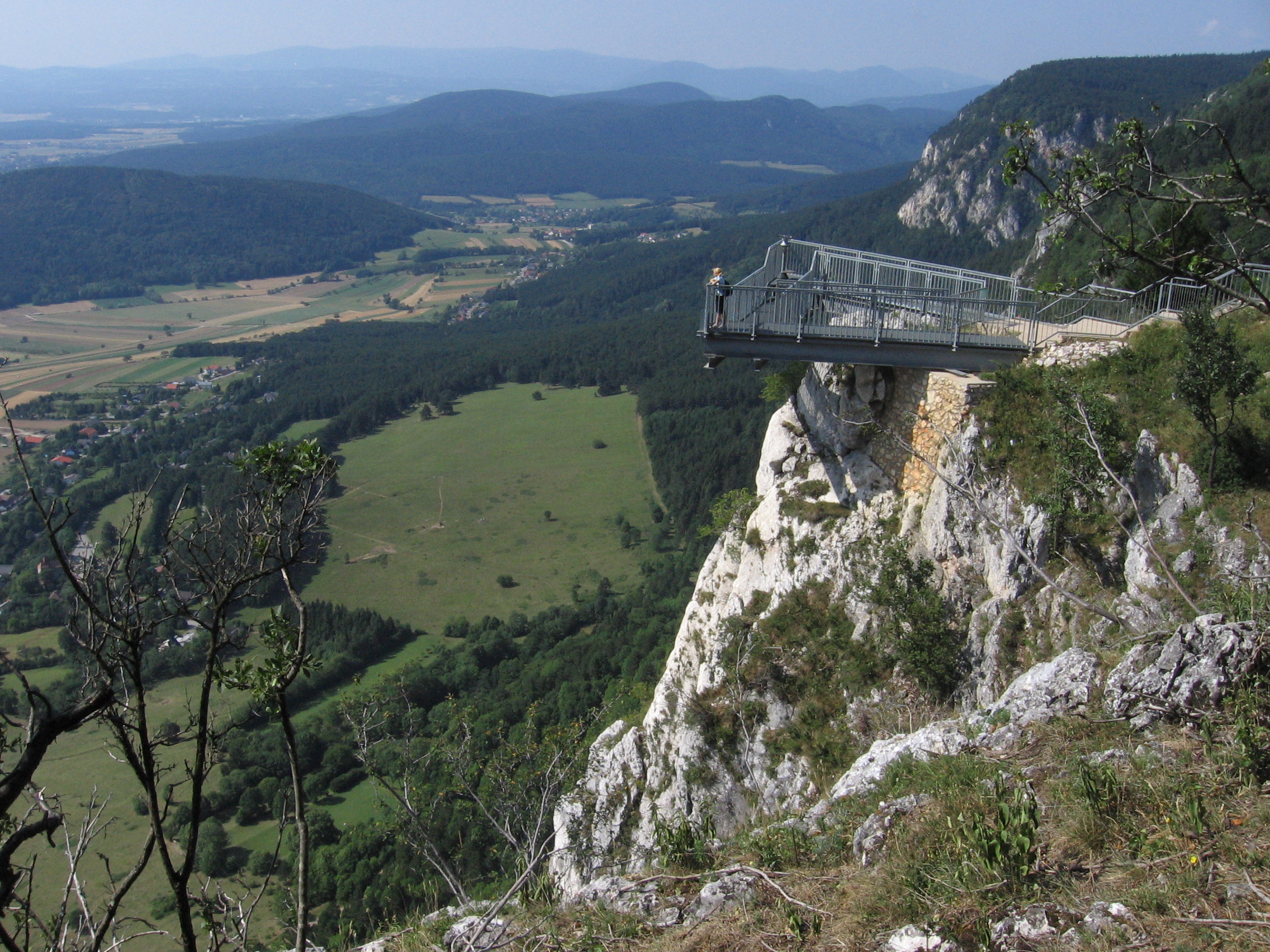
The Skywalk erected in 2002 on the upper edge of the Wand

The Hohe Wand region comprises a rock formation with its surrounding area, situated on the Hohe Wand mountain in Austria, that is protected as a nature park. It is located in the Gutenstein Alps in the state of Lower Austria.

== Description ==
The area forms the eastern edge of the Alps as it transitions to the Pannonian Plain and Vienna Basin. Its bedrock consists of limestone. The nature park is easily accessible, but charges are levied for certain facilities and for access by car.

The nature park is located in the municipalities of Wöllersdorf-Steinabrückl, Bad Fischau-Brunn, Hohe Wand and Höflein an der Hohen Wand. It is also part of a European protected area, the Northeastern Perimeter Alps, and the Hohe Wand-Dürre Wand Nature Reserve.

== Natural attractions ==
The Hohe Wand is a wooded plateau whose flora and fauna lie in the transition zone influenced on the one hand by the Alps and on the other by the Pannonian Plain. Its rocky cliffs, up to 230 metres high, drop away to the southeast, exposed to the so-called "New World". In the limestone rock are several caves, both large and small, such as the Cserny Cave near the Felsenpfad and the Unicorn Cave, a show cave near Dreistetten.

== Man-made attractions ==
There has long been a tourist infrastructure on the plateau. In the 1930s, a public road up to the plateau was hewn out of the rock. There even used to be a chairlift to the area; it is now closed. On the plateau itself are the following facilities:

- A semi-natural playground with adjacent petting zoo and a so-called "play and fun mountain" with a wild animal park, observation tower and large-scale marmot to climb on,
- An alpine and local history museum,
- A nature park room,
- A dense network of hiking paths, secured klettersteigs, and open climbing terrain as well as launch sites for hang gliding and paragliding,
- At the edge of the Wand plateau is an observation terrace, called the "Skywalk" (see illustration) and a so-called "cliff path" (Felsenpfad) near the Kohlröserlhaus,
- Guided woodland tours, adventure tours and llama trekking.
