= Coesfelder Berg =

Hill in Germany

Coordinates: 51°56′51″N 7°12′40″E

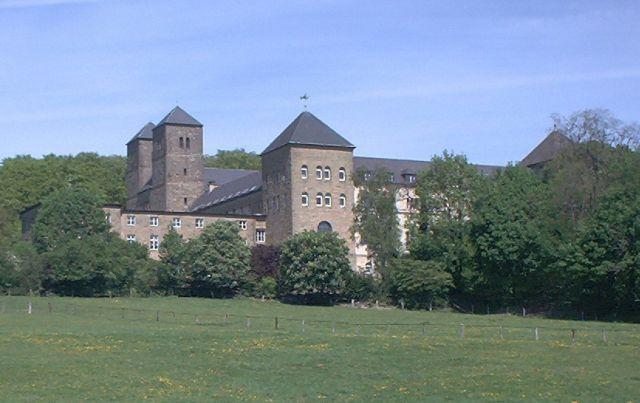
Gerleve Abbey on the Coesfelder Berg

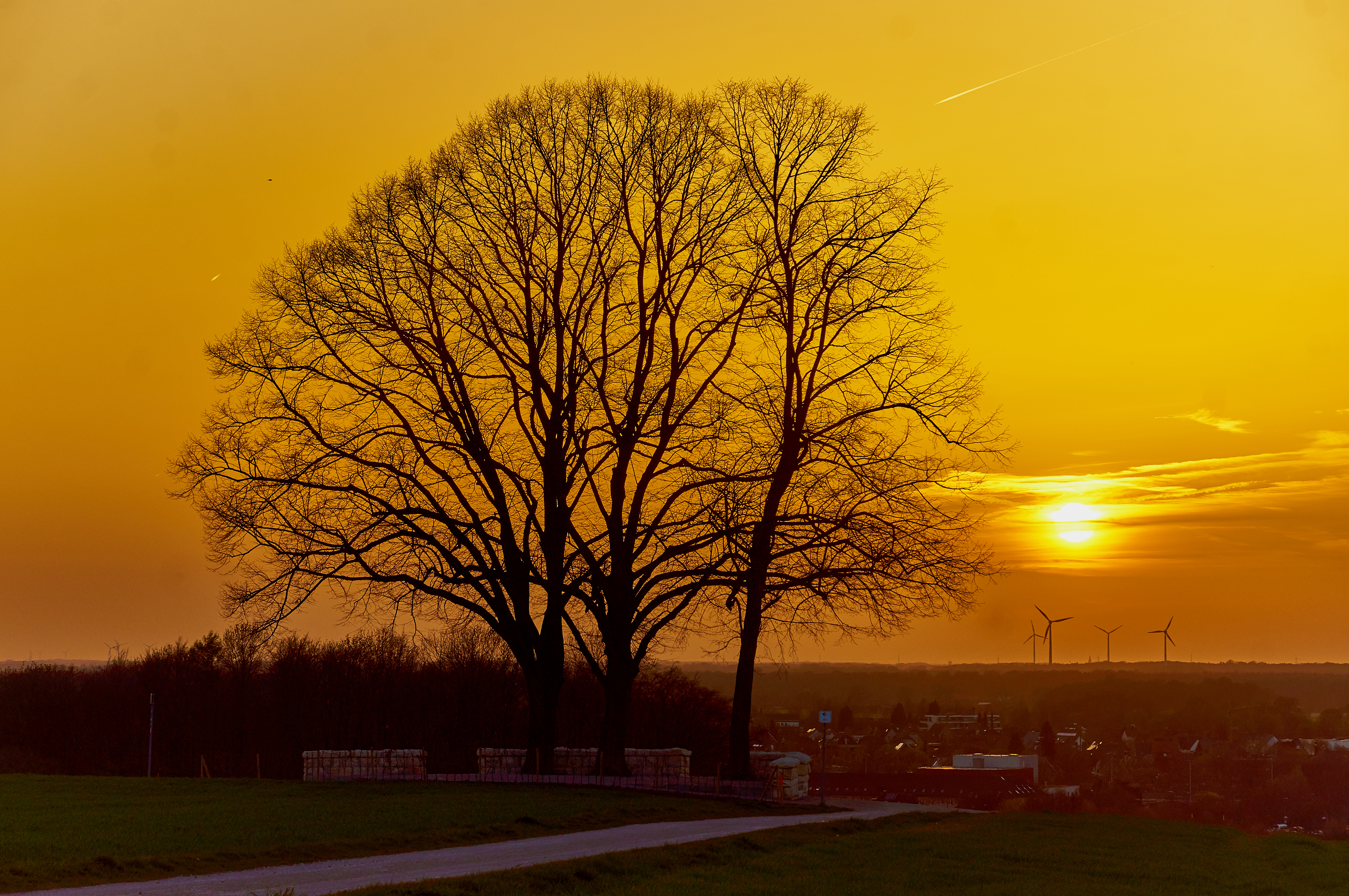
The Dreilindenhöhe with a view over the area around Coesfeld

The Coesfelder Berg (152 m) is the westernmost top in the Coesfeld-Darup Hills, a range that is the southwest continuation of the Baumberge hills in the Münsterland in North Germany.

The hill, which is east of the town of Coesfeld (Coesfeld county, North Rhine-Westphalia) is a wide ridge that rises between the streams of the Berkel and the Honigbach, descends towards the west relatively steeply from around 140 m above sea level (NN) to just under 80 m above sea level (NN) in the borough of Coesfeld. It is the hausberg for the town.

From the Ludgerirast, the highest point of the hill, there are good views thanks of large parts of the western Münsterland thanks to the treeless summit. It is here that, according to Ludgerus (Ludger or Liudger), the first Bishop of Münster paused whilst out walking and blessed the Münsterland on the evening before his death in Billerbeck. The Dreilindenhöhe, with the three lime trees (Tilia europaea that give it the name) and a viewing point on the hillside above the town of Coesfeld.

In a scenic side valley south of the Ludgerirast, at a height of 125 metres, is the Benedictine abbey of Gerleve. According to legend, St. Liudger blessed the Bishopric of Münster, that he had founded, from the highest point of the hill on the evening before his death. This is commemorated by a monument erected in 1934 by Brother Dominikus Zwernemann (1901-1983) of Gerleve Abbey.
