= Hausberg =

German for a prominent mountain near a populated place

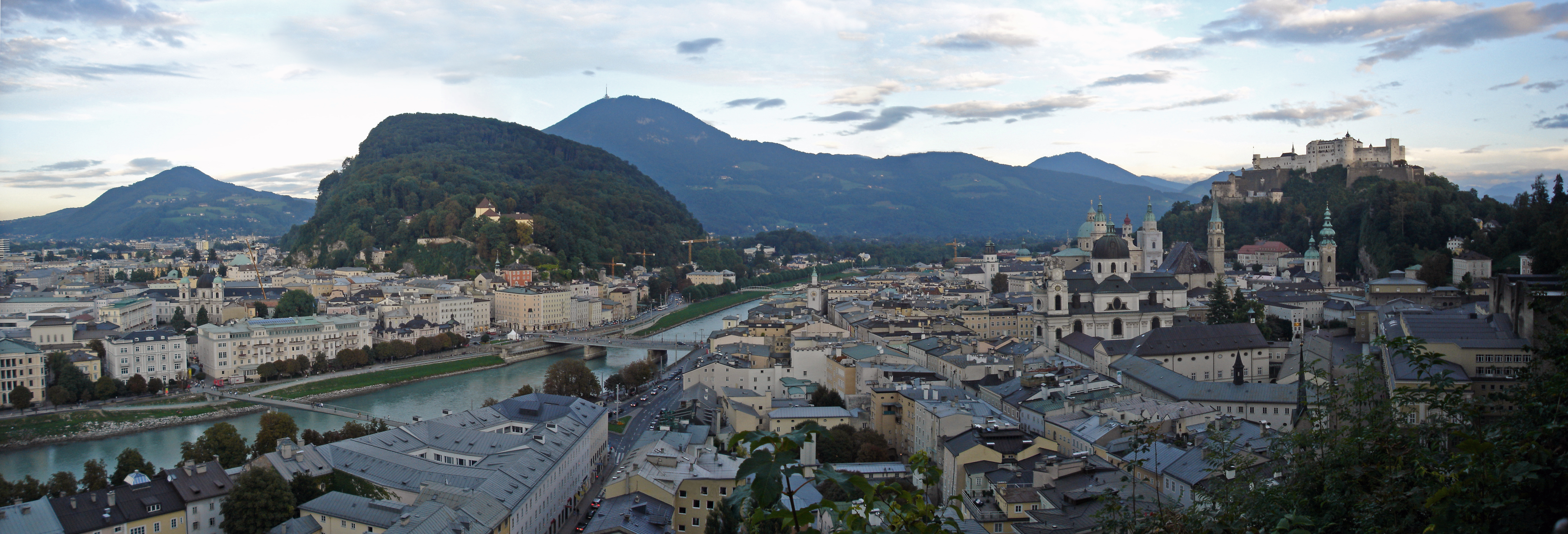
Salzburg, a city on the edge of the Alps. Two (of several) Stadtberge may be seen in the middle of the Old City (the Festungsberg and Kapuzinerberg). Behind: one of the two Hausberge, the Gaisberg

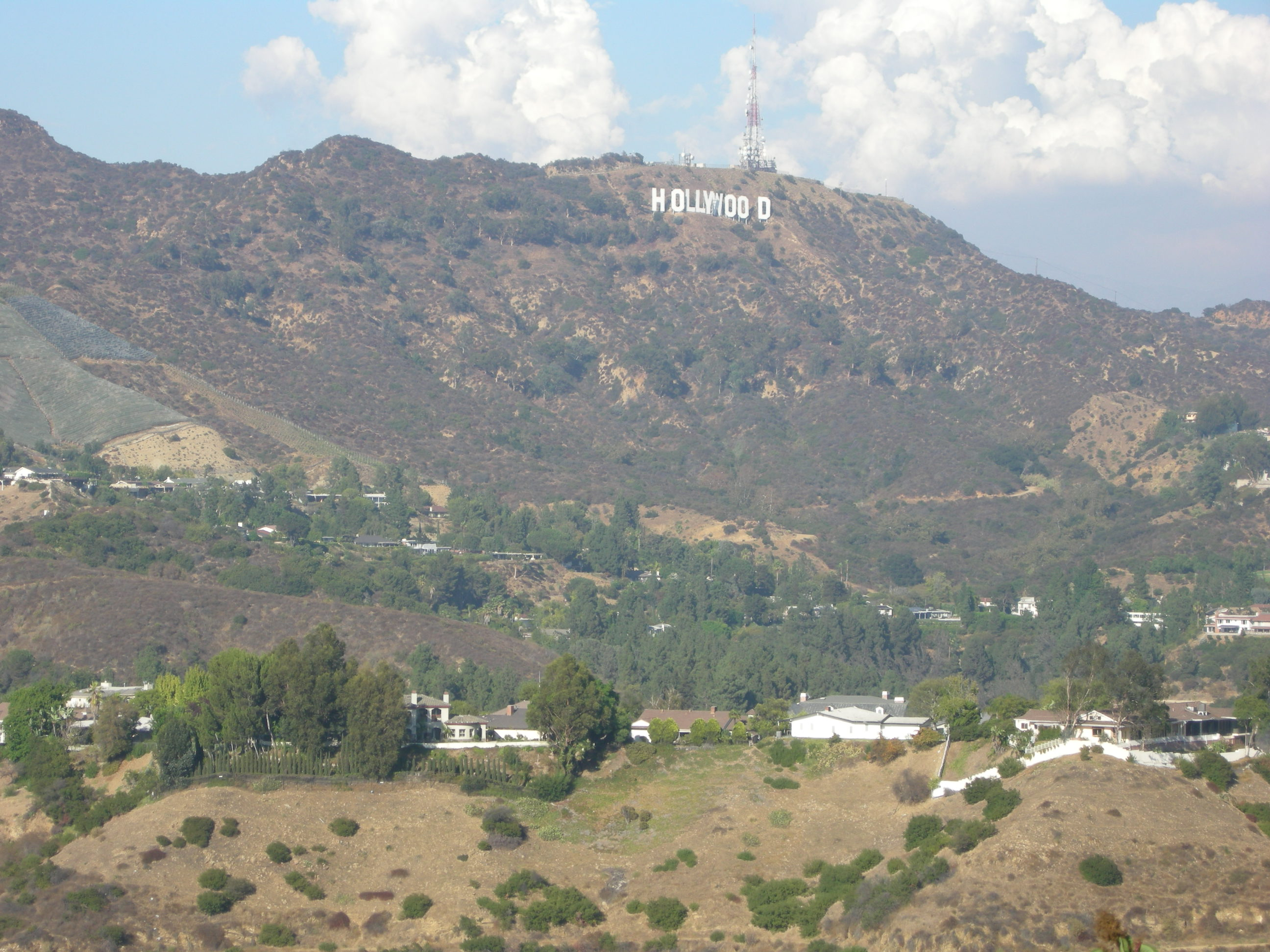
Mount Lee, Hollywood, one of the best known Hausberge in the world thanks to its Hollywood Sign

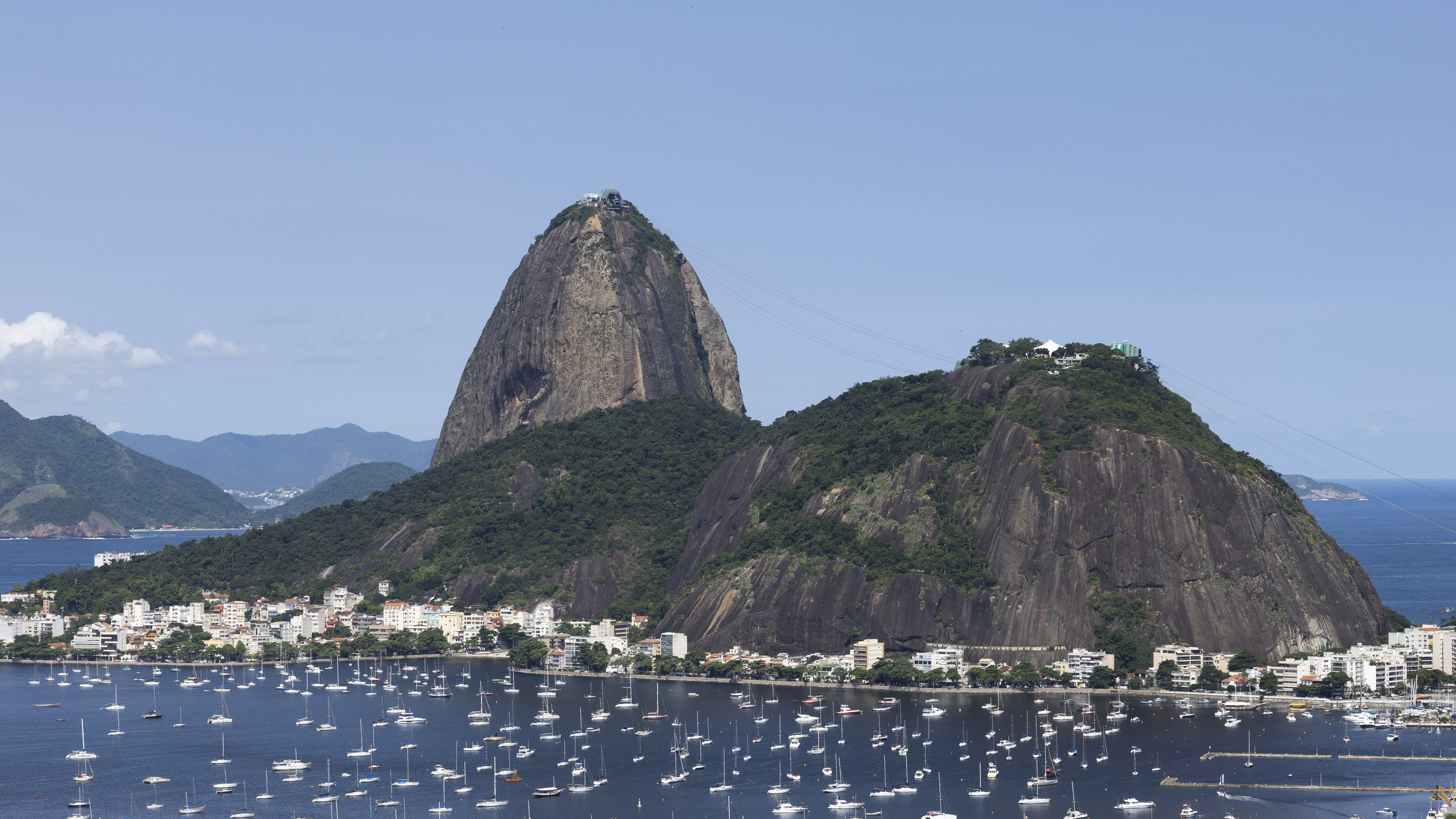
Sugarloaf Mountain, Pão De Açúcar, Rio, an iconic Stadtberg

Hausberg (lit.: "house mountain", plural: Hausberge) is German for a prominent mountain or hill in the immediate vicinity of a village, town or city, usually located on its municipal territory, but outside the built up area. It means something like the "local mountain" or "local hill" closely associated with a settlement by its population. A hill within a town or city itself is usually referred to in German as a Stadtberg.

A Hausberg forms a backdrop to its home settlement and also offers a prominent viewing point looking over the settlement. As a result, many have cable cars or gondola lifts to transport visitors to the top. "Hausberg" is also a proper name of numerous mountains and hills in German-speaking countries.

A Hausberg does not have to lie within a town's municipal boundaries: The Pfänder, the Hausberg of the town of Bregenz in Austria, is in the municipality of Lochau and the highest summit of the Pilatus, the Hausberg of Lucerne, is just outside the Canton of Lucerne. There is a national border between Geneva and its Hausberg, the Salève in France.

The following list contains a selection of well-known Hausberge (with heights):

== Albania ==
- Tirana, the Dajti (1,613 m)

== Austria ==
- Bregenz, the Pfänder (1,064 m)
- Graz, the Schöckl (1,445 m)
- Innsbruck, the Patscherkofel (2,246 m) and the Kleiner Solstein (2,637 m)
- Klagenfurt the Kreuzbergl (517 m)
- Salzburg, the Untersberg (1,973 m) and the Gaisberg (1,288 m)
- Vienna, the Kahlenberg (484 m; 300 m above the city) is the most important Stadtberg in Vienna (east flank of the Vienna Woods); the mountains of the Rax-Schneeberg Group are also viewed as the Vienna Hausberge.

== Croatia ==
- Zagreb, the Medvednica (Sljeme) (1,035 m)

== France ==
- Grenoble, the Bastille (476 m)

== Germany ==
- Aachen: the Lousberg (262.4 m)
- Bad Lauterberg, the Hausberg (ca. 420 m)
- Baden-Baden, the Merkur (668,3 m)
- Coesfeld, the Coesfelder Berg (ca. 140 m)
- Frankfurt am Main, the Lohrberg (212.4 m) and the Großer Feldberg (ca. 879 m)
- Freiburg im Breisgau, the Schlossberg (455.9 m) and the Schauinsland (1,284.4 m)
- Görlitz, the Landeskrone (419.4 m)
- Heidelberg, the Königstuhl (567.8 m) and the Heiligenberg (439.9 m)
- Jena, the Hausberg (391.7 m) and the Jenzig (385.3 m)
- Karlsruhe, the Turmberg (256.0 m)
- Kassel, the Karlsberg (526.2 m) with the Hercules monument (515 m) and the Hohe Gras (614,8 m) with its eponymous viewing tower
- Reutlingen, the Achalm (707.1 m)
- Singen, the Hohentwiel (689.9 m)
- Tübingen, the Österberg (437.9 m)
- Tuttlingen, the Honberg (ca. 739 m) and the Witthoh (862.0 m)
- Weimar, the Großer Ettersberg (481.6 m)
- Wiesbaden, the Neroberg (245.0 m)

== Italy ==
- Pompeii, Vesuvius (1,281 m)
- Catania, Mount Etna (3,323 m)
- Bolzano, Ritten (1,154 m)

== Spain ==
- Barcelona, the Tibidabo (512 m)

== Switzerland ==
- Ascona, Monte Verità (321 m)
- Basel, St. Chrischona (522 m; 250 m above the city)
- Bern, the Gurten (858 m; 300 m above the city)
- Chur, the Haldensteiner Calanda (2,806 m)
- Geneva, Mont Salève (1,375 m)
- Grindelwald, the Eiger (3,967 m)
- Locarno, the Cimetta (1,672 m)
- Lugano, Monte Brè (925 m; 650 m above the town) and Monte San Salvatore (912 m)
- Lucerne, the Pilatus (2,132 m)
- Neuchâtel, the Chaumont (1,180 m)
- Solothurn, the Weissenstein (1,395 m)
- St. Gallen, the Säntis (2,502 m)
- Thun, the Stockhorn (2,190 m)
- Zermatt, the Matterhorn (4,478 m)
- Zürich, the Uetliberg (873 m)

== Outside Europe ==
=== Brazil ===
- Rio de Janeiro, Sugarloaf Mountain (395 m) and the Corcovado (710 m)

=== South Africa ===
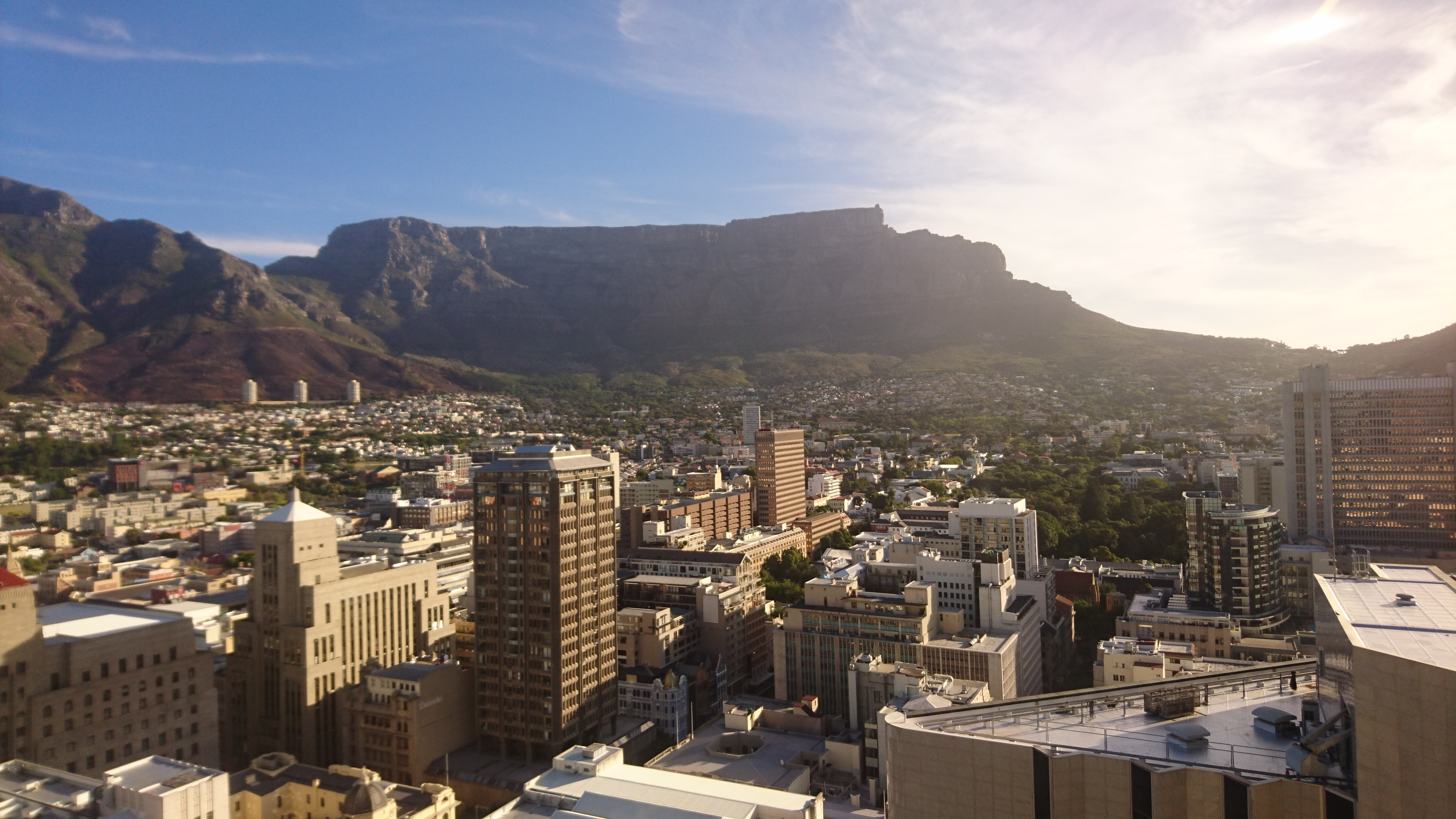
Cape Town's central business district is located at the foot of Table Mountain.

- Cape Town, Table Mountain (1,087 m)

=== Japan ===
- Sendai, Izumigatake (1,172m)

=== Kyrgyzstan ===
- Osh, Sulayman Mountain (1,110m)

=== Malaysia ===
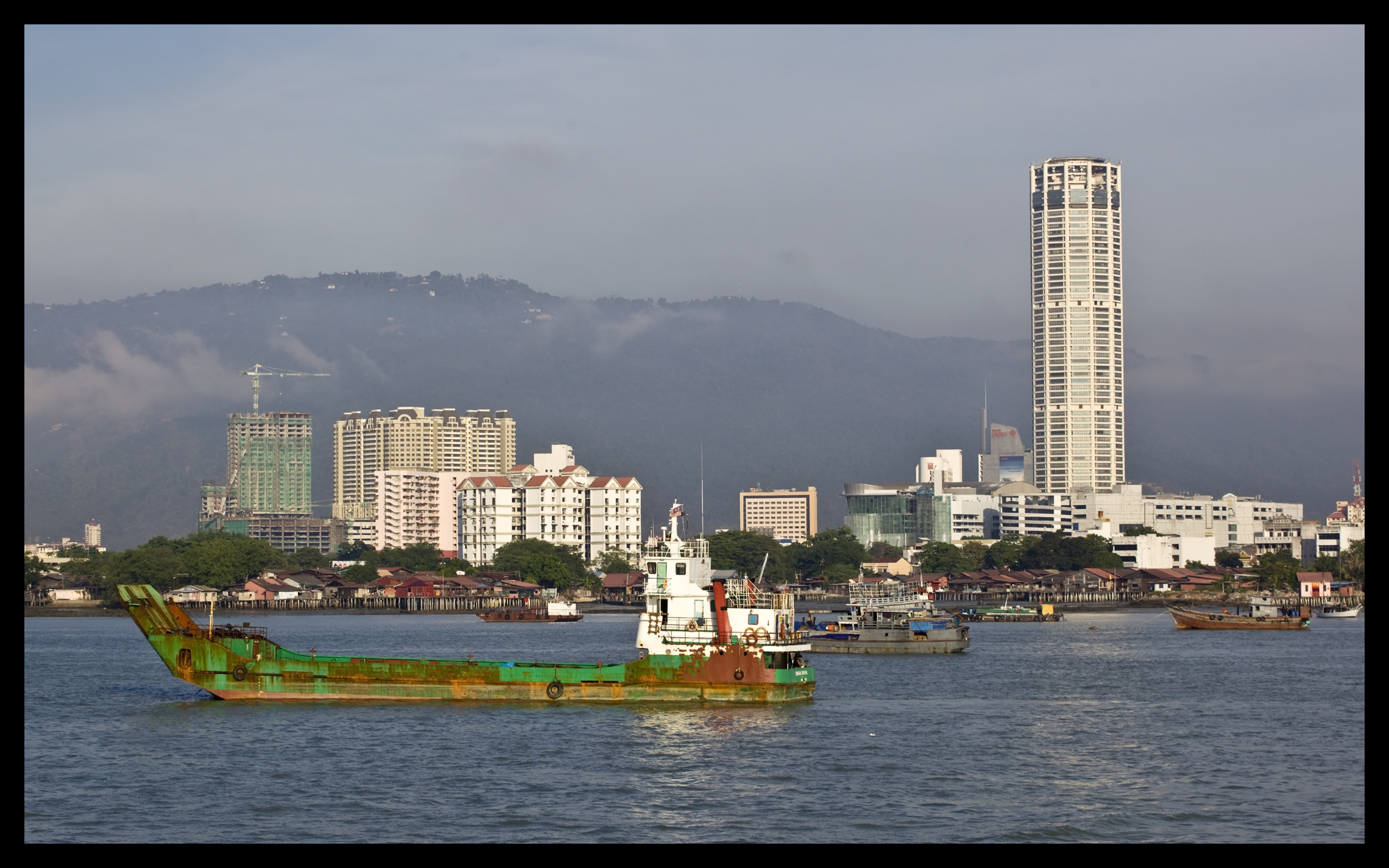
Penang Hill towering over George Town

- George Town, Penang Hill (833 m)
- Kluang, Mount Lambak (510 m)

=== Peru ===
- Arequipa, Misti (5,822 m)

=== Venezuela ===
- Caracas, El Ávila with Pico Naiguatá (2,765m)
