= Dürre Wand =

Mountain ridge in Lower Austria

Coordinates: 47°49′59″N 15°55′17″E

The Dürre Wand (literally barren wall) is a mountain ridge in Lower Austria and belongs topographically to the Gutenstein Alps. It stretches from Miesenbach in a WSW direction to the Schneeberg. The Dürre Wand is a ridge, rocky in places, which is bordered by pastures, forests and waterfalls. In contrast to Hohe Wand plateau in the immediate east, it culminates in a narrow ridge-line with its hiking trail offering outstanding views.

== Elevations ==
The highest elevations are Katharinenschlag (1,222 m (AA)), Schober (1,213 m above sea level (AA)), Öhler (1,183 m above sea level (AA)) and Plattenstein (1,154 m above sea level (AA)).

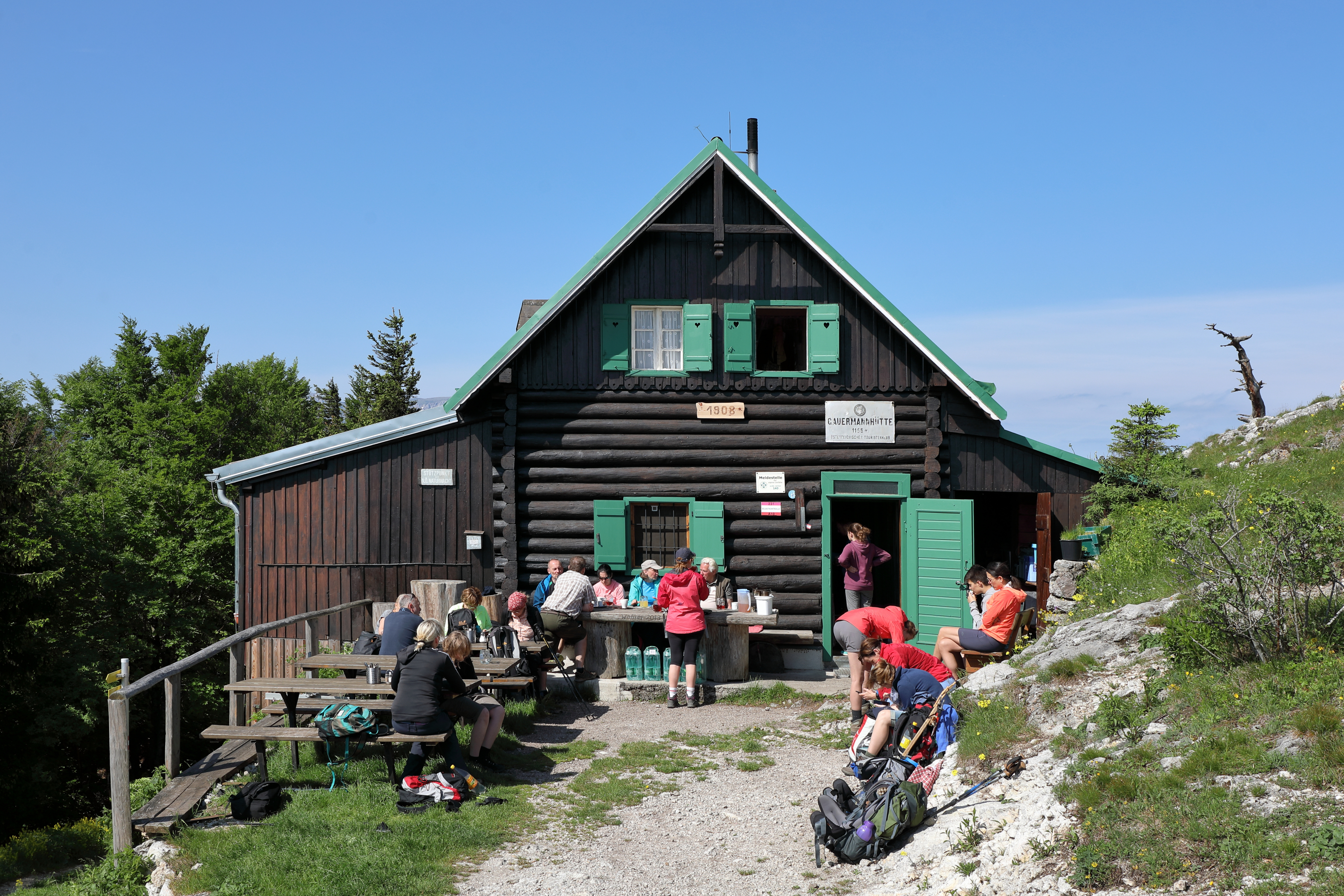
Gauermann Hut (June 2019)

== Refuge huts ==
Located more or less central on the ridge, east of Öhler at a height of 1,027 m above sea level (AA), is the Öhler (Refuge) Hut which belongs to Friends of Nature (Naturfreunde). On Plattenstein sits the Gauermann Hut owned and run by the Austrian Tourist Club (Österreichischer Touristenklub) or ÖTK.

== Caves ==
The Tabler Cave (Tablerhöhle, 1862/10) east of the Plattenstein and the Erzloch (1862/4), a shaft cave east of the Öhler refuge hut, are two caves on the crest of the Dürre Wand. Other important caves are the Malepartuskluft (1862/19), Bergmilchkammer (1862/20), Marechle Cave (1862/21), Schichtkammer (1862/23) and the Vierpfeiler Cave (1862/24) (all in the Marecherkogel south of the Öhler near Puchberg am Schneeberg), the Zinsensteinhöhle (1862/11) and the Waldbodenloch (1862/61) (all in the north of the Dürre Wand near Gutenstein). In all, exactly one hundred caves are recorded in the register for Region 1862 - Dürre Wand.

== Gallery ==
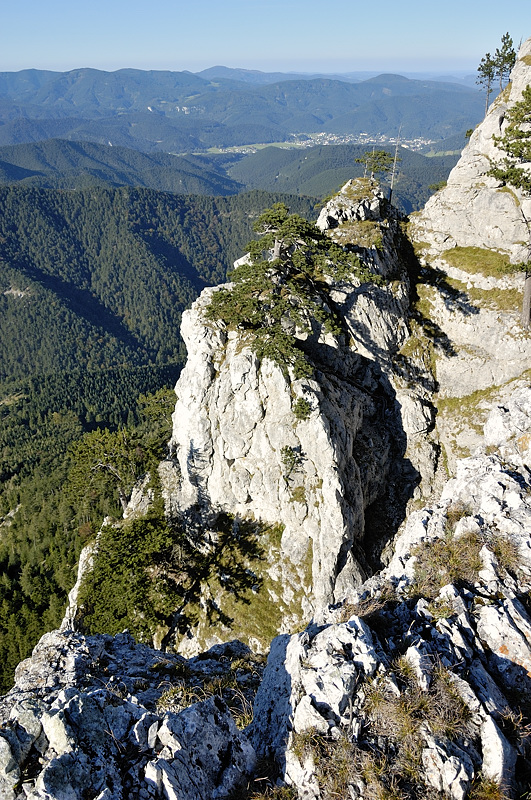
Plattenstein (1,154 m)

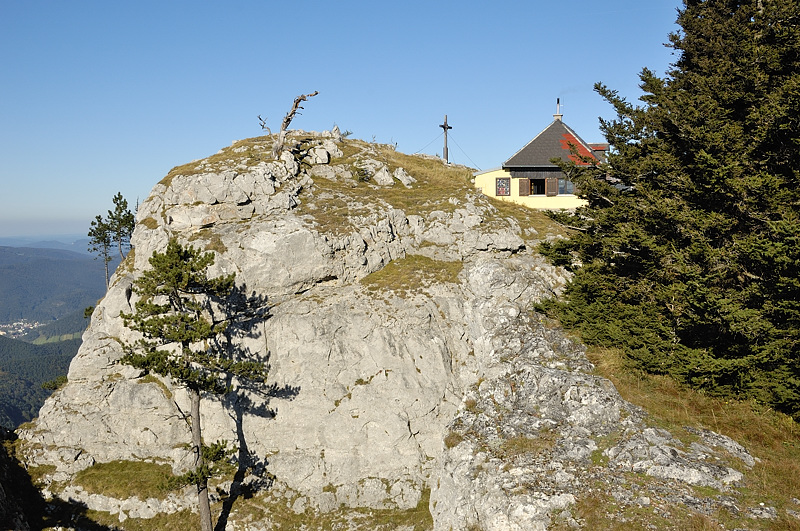
Gauermann Hut

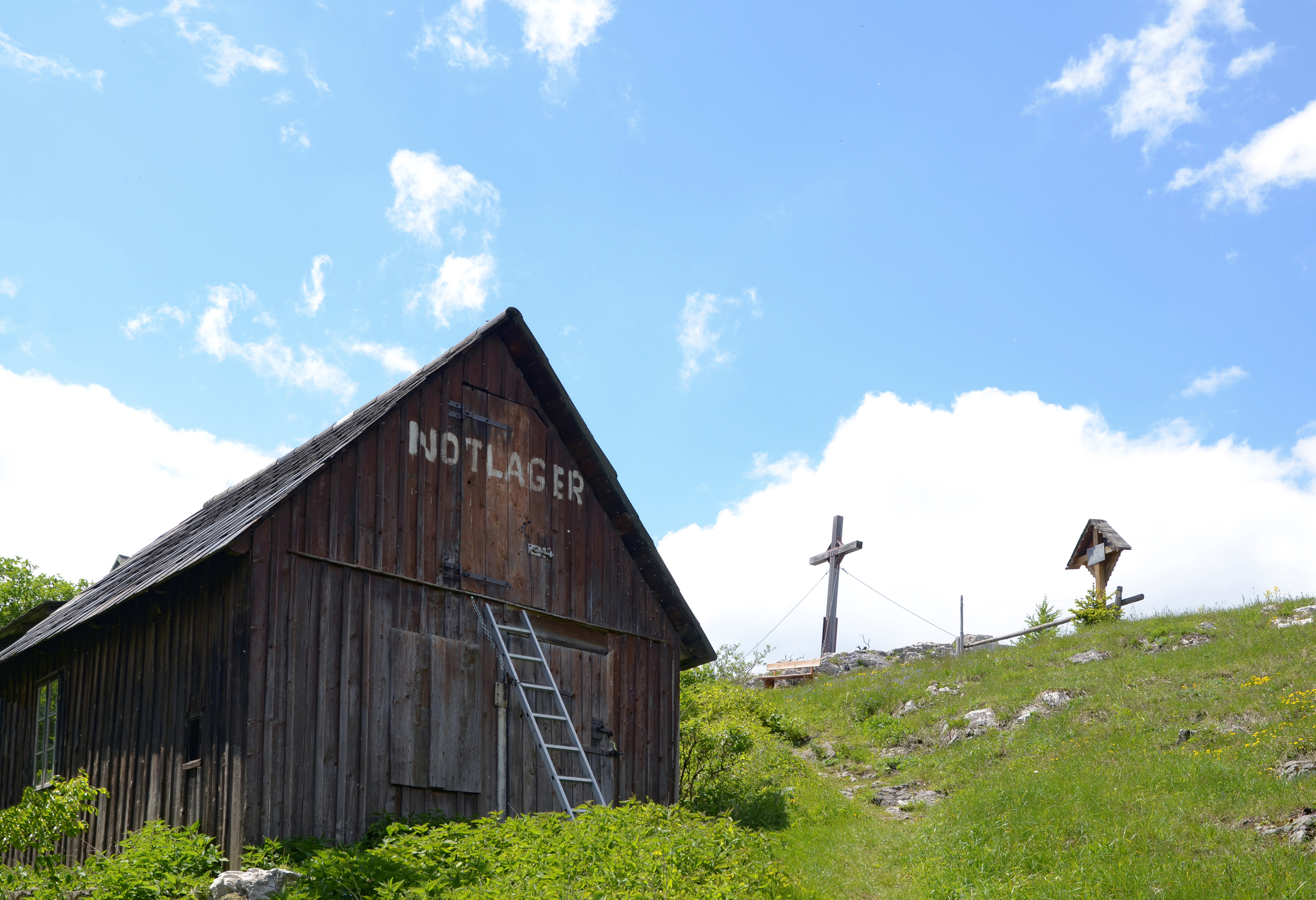
Rescue shack next Gauermann Hut

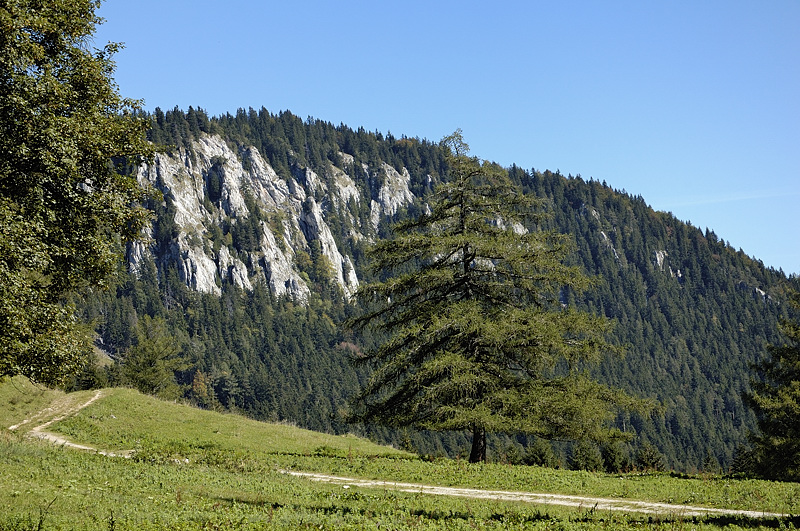
The Öhler (1,183 m)

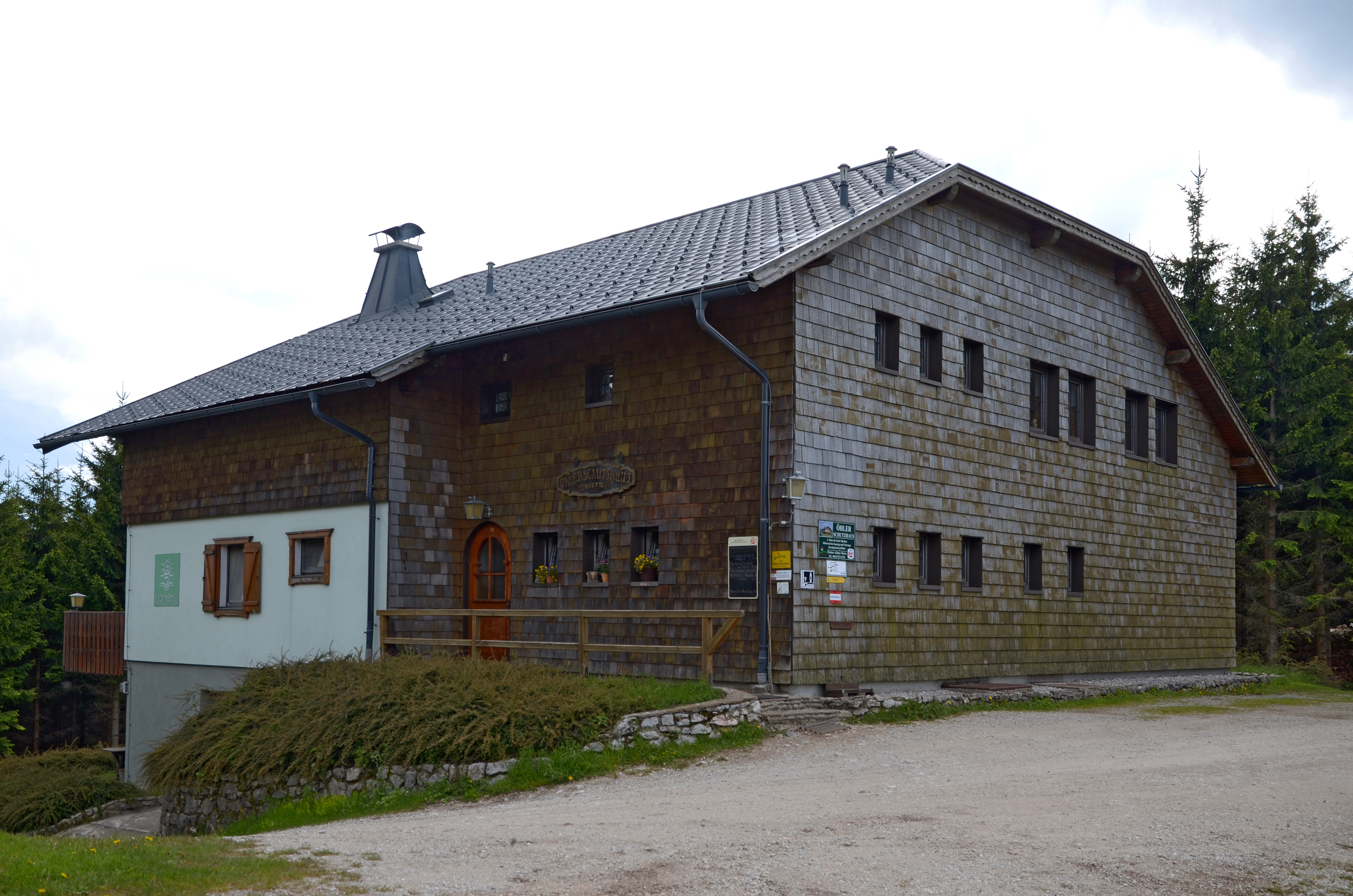
Öhler Rescue Hut

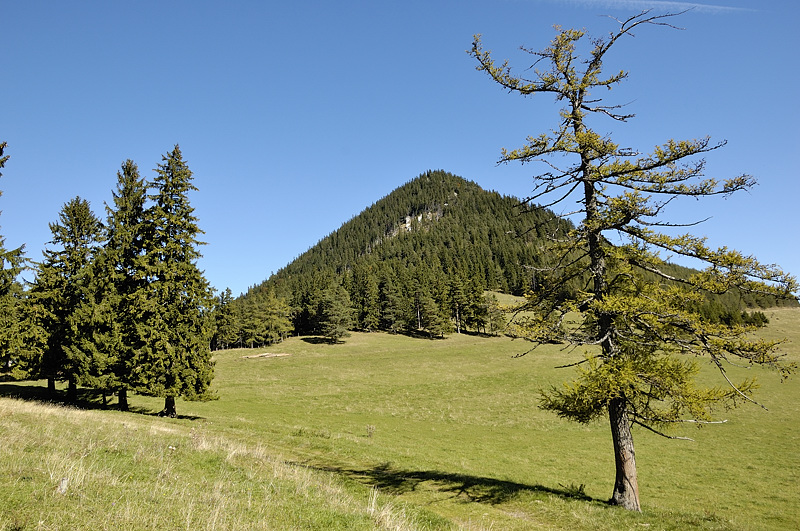
The Schober (1,213 m)

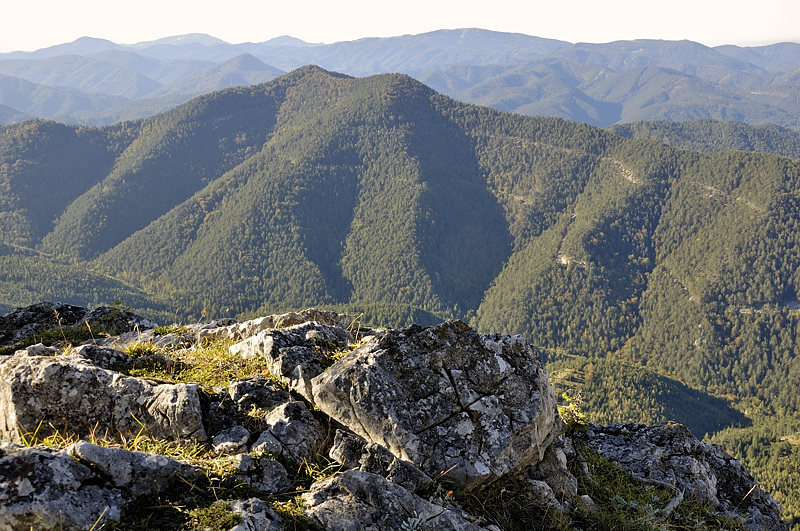
View from the Plattenstein

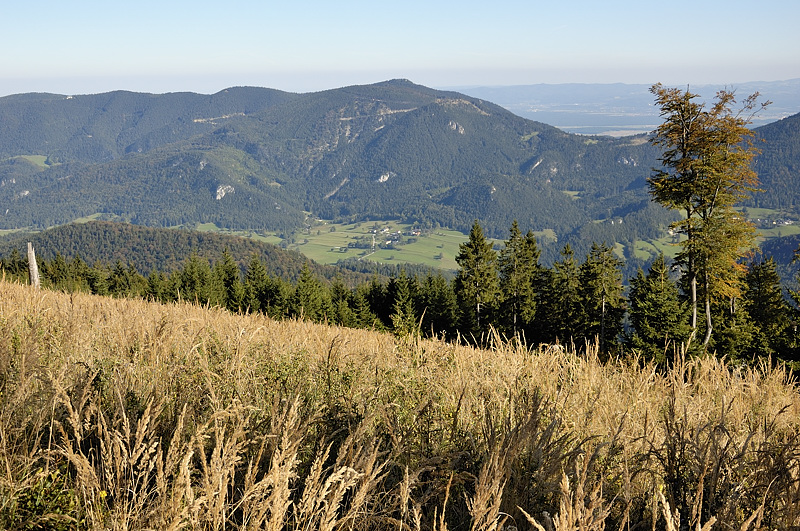
View from the Katharinenschlag (1,222 m)

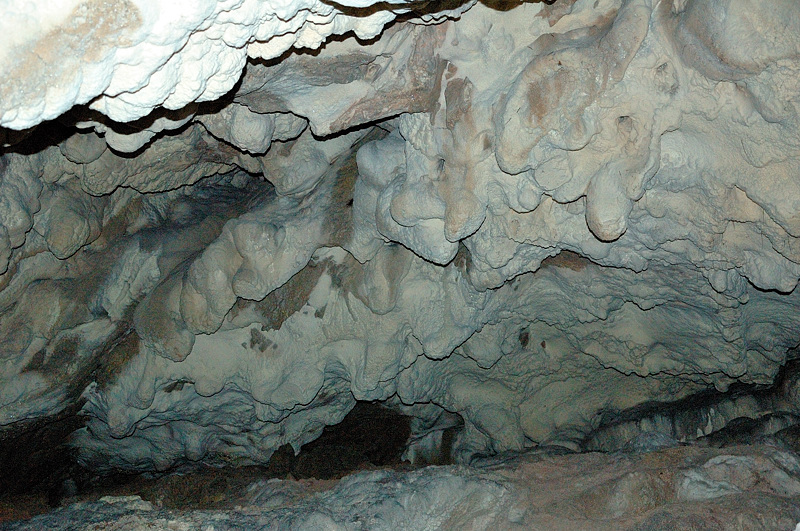
Bergmilchkammer Cave

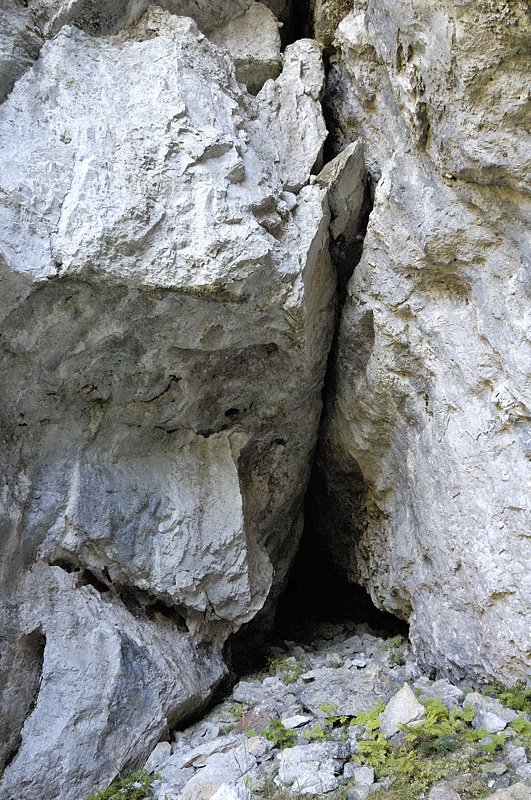
Malepartuskluft Cave

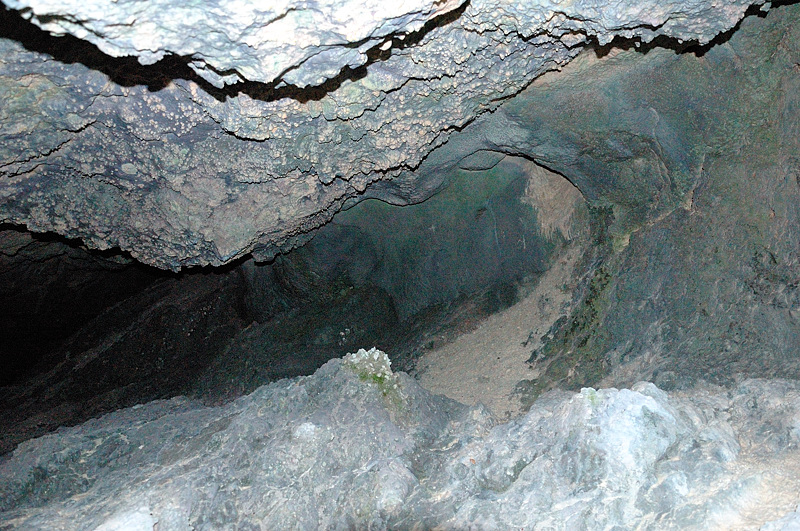
Marechle Cave

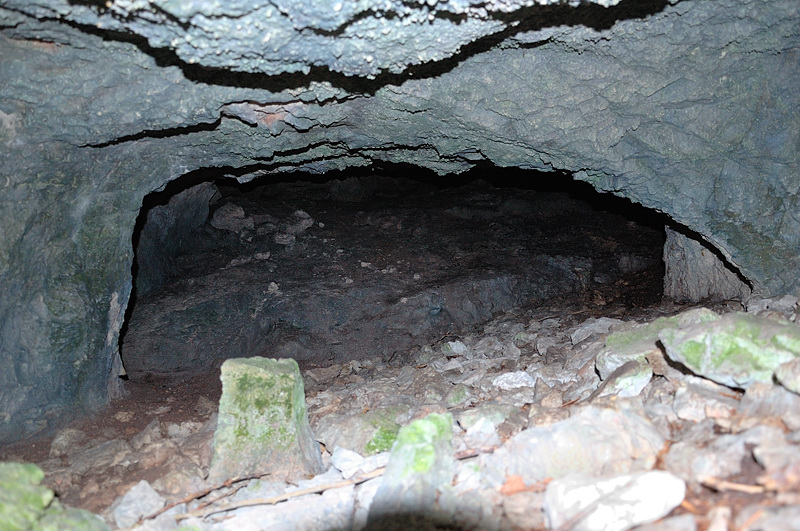
Schoberbachklamm Cave

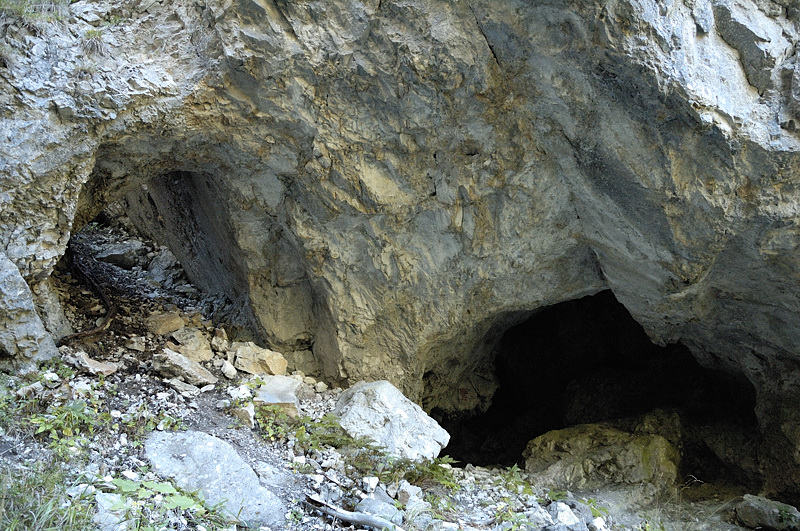
Lower Öhler Cave
