= Friedrich Gauermann =

Austrian painter (1807–1862)

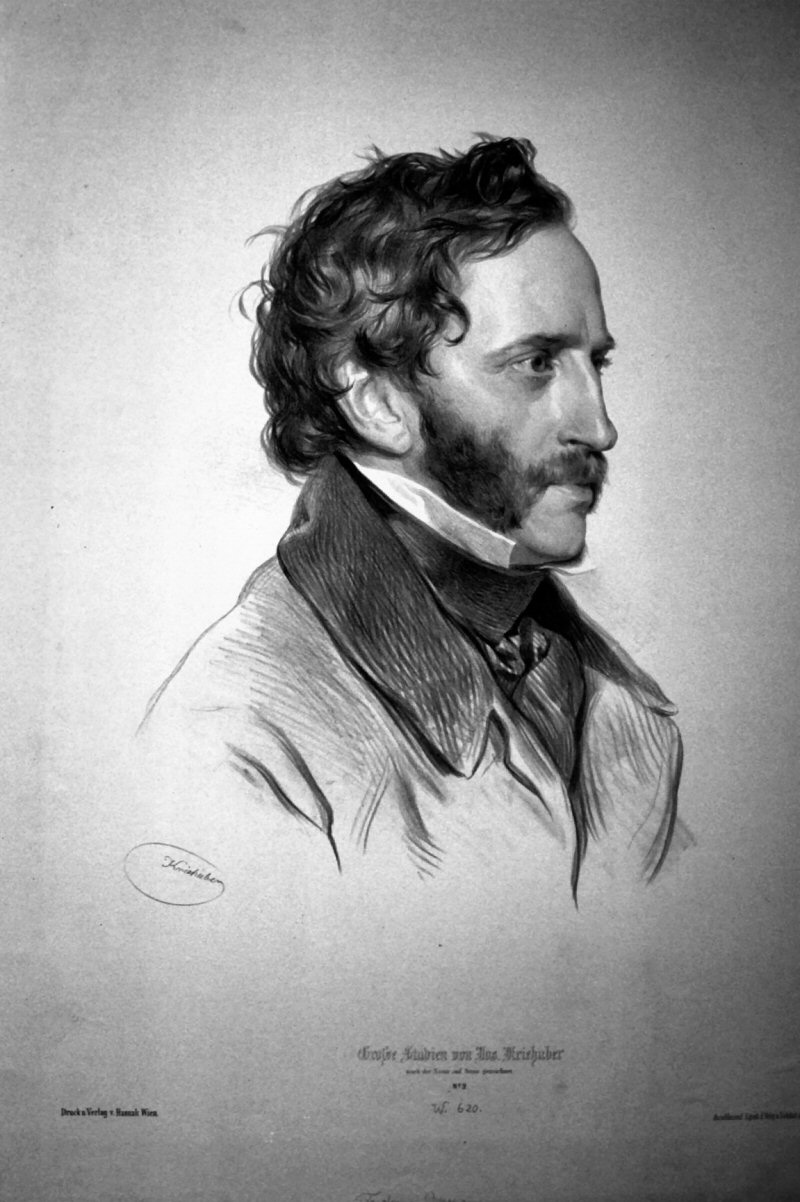
Friedrich Gauermann, Lithograph by Josef Kriehuber

Friedrich Gauermann (10 September 1807 – 7 July 1862) was an Austrian painter. The son of the landscape painter Jacob Gauermann (1773–1843), he was born at Miesenbach near Gutenstein in Lower Austria. He was an early representative of the Veristic style devoted to nature in all its diversity. He was born in Scheuchenstein.

It was the intention of his father that Gauermann should devote himself to agriculture, but the example of an elder brother, who, however, died early, fostered his inclination towards art. Under his father's direction he began studies in landscape, and he also diligently copied the works of the chief masters in animal painting which were contained in the academy and court library of Vienna. In the summer he made art tours in the districts of Styria, Tirol, and Salzburg.

Two animal pieces which he exhibited at the Vienna Exhibition of 1824 were regarded as remarkable productions for his years, and led to his receiving commissions in 1825 and 1826 from Prince Metternich and Caraman, the French ambassador. His reputation was greatly increased by his picture The Storm, exhibited in 1829, and from that time his works were much sought after and obtained correspondingly high prices. His Field Labourer was regarded by many as the most noteworthy picture in the Vienna exhibition of 1834, and his numerous animal pieces have entitled him to a place in the first rank of painters of that class of subjects.

The peculiarity of his pictures is the representation of human and animal figures in connexion with appropriate landscapes and in characteristic situations so as to manifest nature as a living whole, and he particularly excels in depicting the free life of animals in wild mountain scenery. Along with great mastery of the technicalities of his art, his works exhibit patient and keen observation, free and correct handling of details, and bold and clear colouring. He died at Vienna on 7 July 1862.

Many of his pictures have been engraved, and after his death a selection of fifty-three of his works was prepared for this purpose by the Austrian Kunstverein (Art Union).

His art influenced among others the works of Joseph Heicke.

== Gallery ==
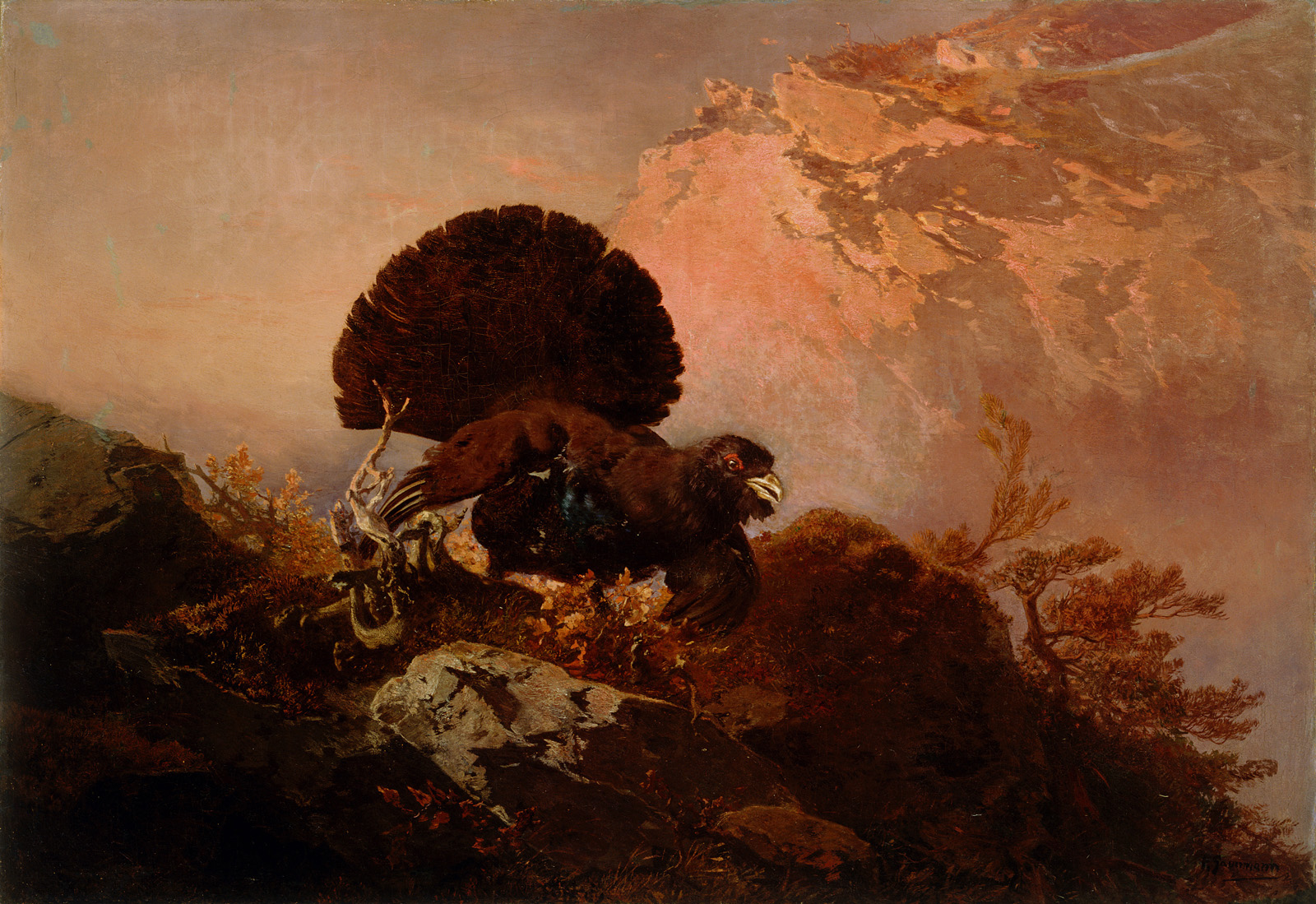
A Capercaillie.

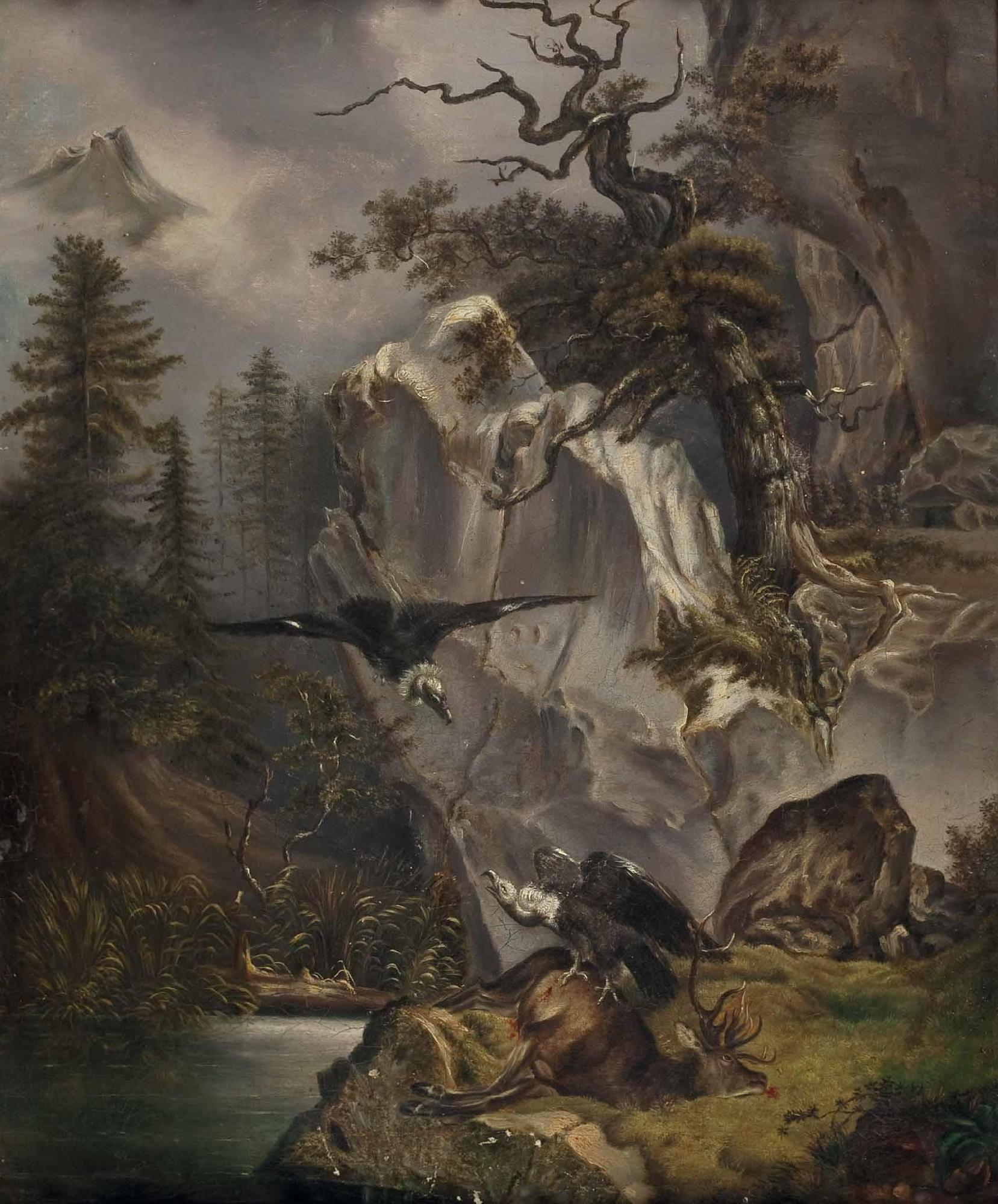
Two Vultures with a Dead Deer (1832)

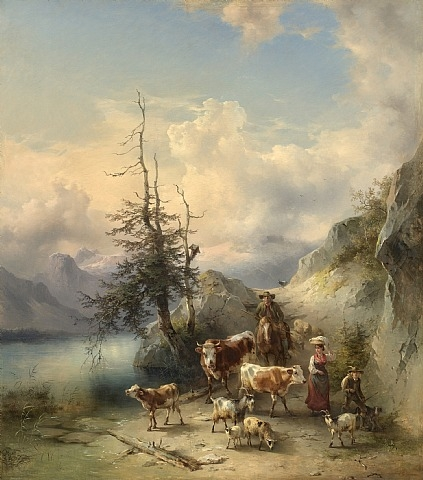
The Return of the Herd from the High Pastures (1855)

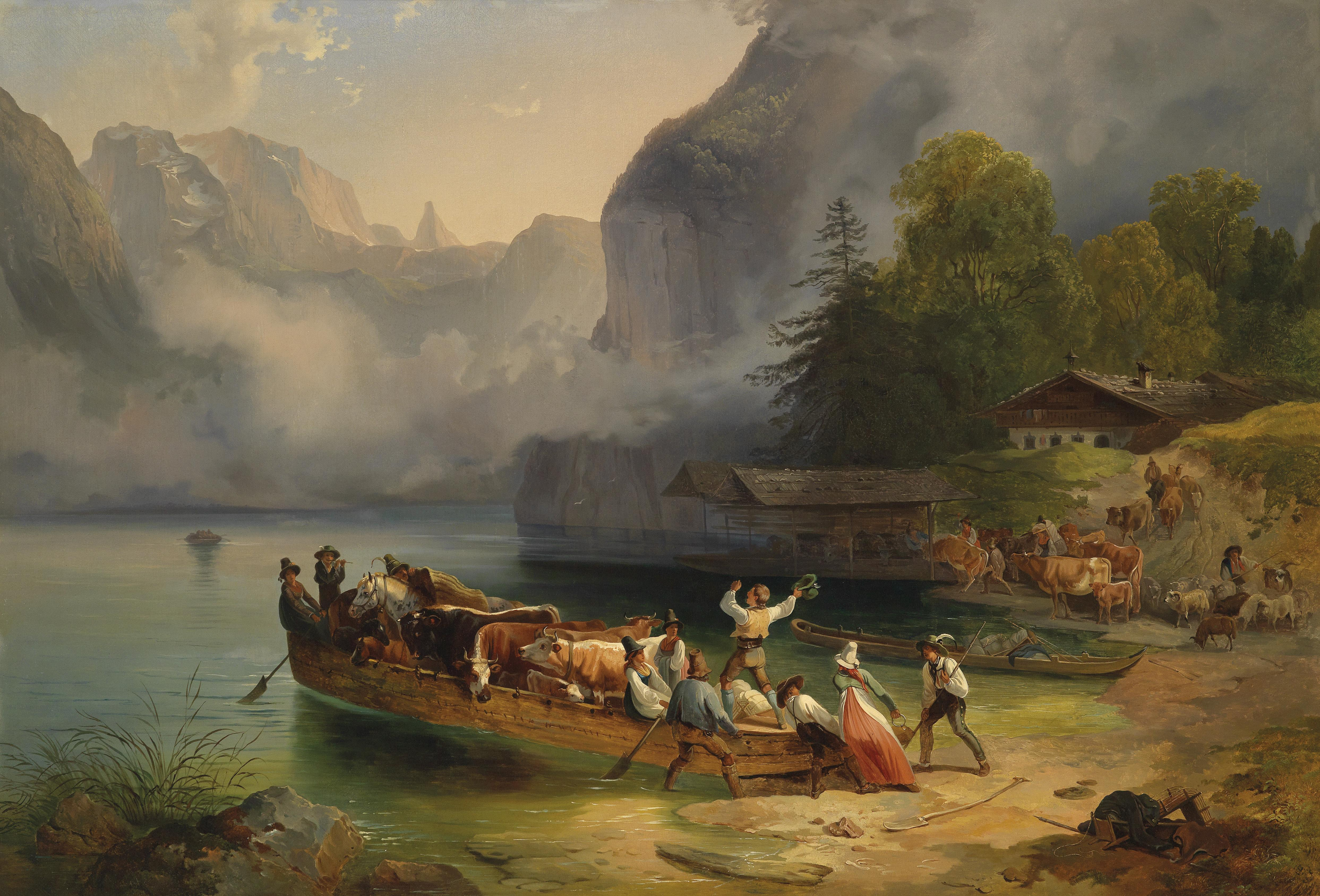
Königssee (before 1862)
