= Unicorn Cave (Austria) =

Public attraction in Lower Austria

- German: Einhornhöhle
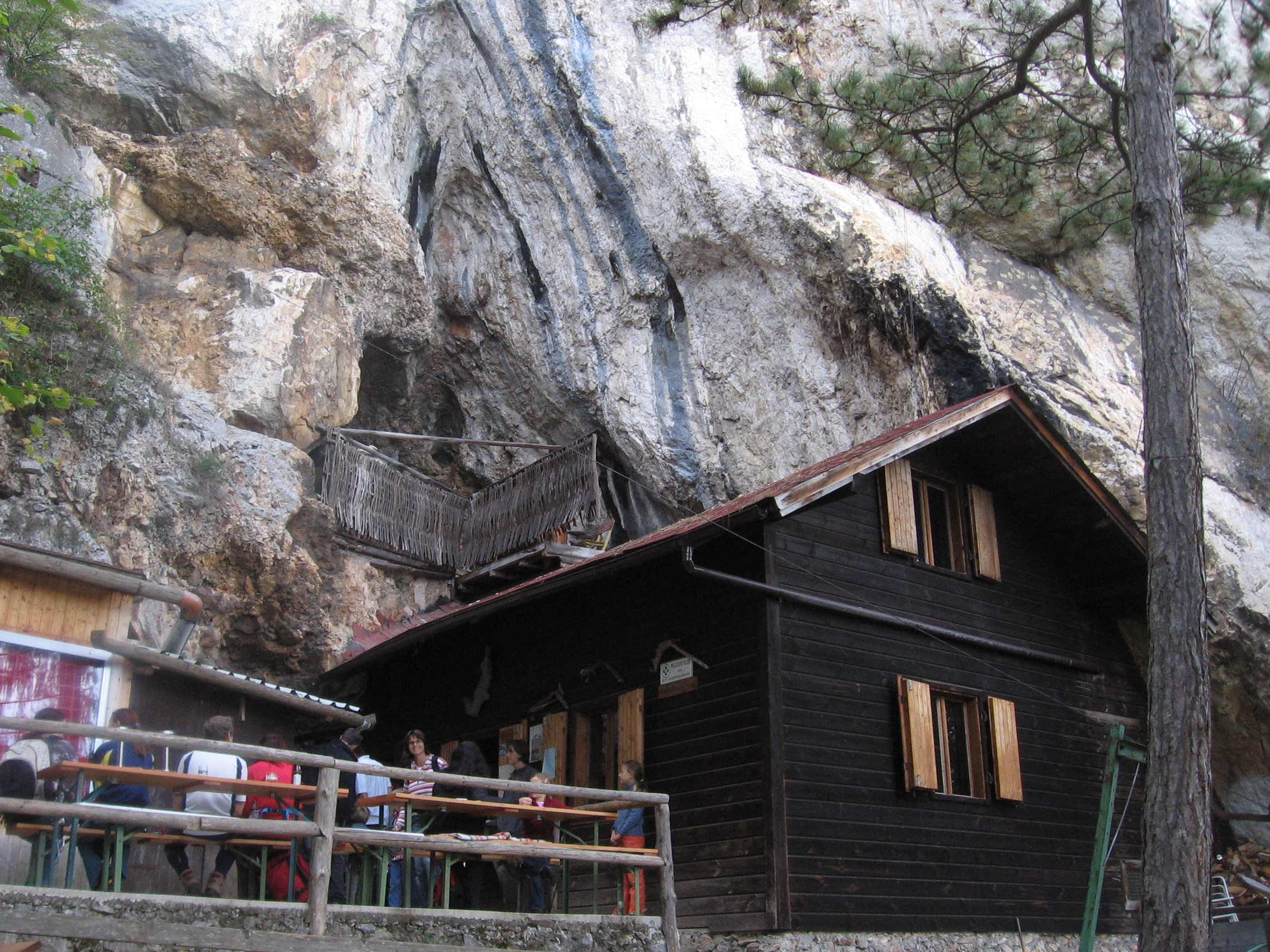
- Cave entrance
- Interactive map of Unicorn Cave
- Location: Hohe Wand Nature Park, Lower Austria
- Coordinates: 47°51′27″N 16°05′23″E
- Length: 80 metres (260 ft)
- Height variation: 5m (+2m, -3m)
- Elevation: 585 metres above sea level
- Discovery: 1927
- Geology: Wand limestone (Triassic)
- Show cave opened: 1930
- Lighting: carbide lamps
- Land Registry number: 1863/5
- Website: www.einhornhoehle.at

The Unicorn Cave (German: Einhornhöhle) in Austria is situated in the Hohe Wand Nature Park near Dreistetten in Lower Austria and may be reached on signposted hiking trails in ca. 20 minutes from Dreistetten (typical signpost illustrated). The cave was discovered in 1927 by Otto Langer senior and opened as a show cave in 1930. In 1964 the structures built by Otto Langer junior were modernised. Guided tours that take about 20 minutes are laid on from Easter to the end of September on Sundays and public holidays.

== Overview ==
The guided tour leads first along an artificially-created gallery into the cave. Its natural entrance is located above the current man-made entrance and is visible from the present-day pathway. A hut has been built in front of the artificial gallery through which the gallery entrance is accessed. Inside the cave the tour leads initially down a side tunnel and then along the main corridor to the first squeeze. In the hall in front of this constriction, the largest dripstones of the guided tour are to be found - stalagmites about 1 metre high (see illustration). From the fork in the two passageways to this hall the tour follows a passage in which a calc-sinter curtain and several stalactites can be seen hanging from the roof. In a niche to the side with a statue of St. Barbara there is also Perlsinter. Numerous animal bones were found in the cave (for example of a cave bear), several exhibits are displayed in the cave itself or are visible in the layers of rock (for example individual teeth or bones).

== Gallery ==
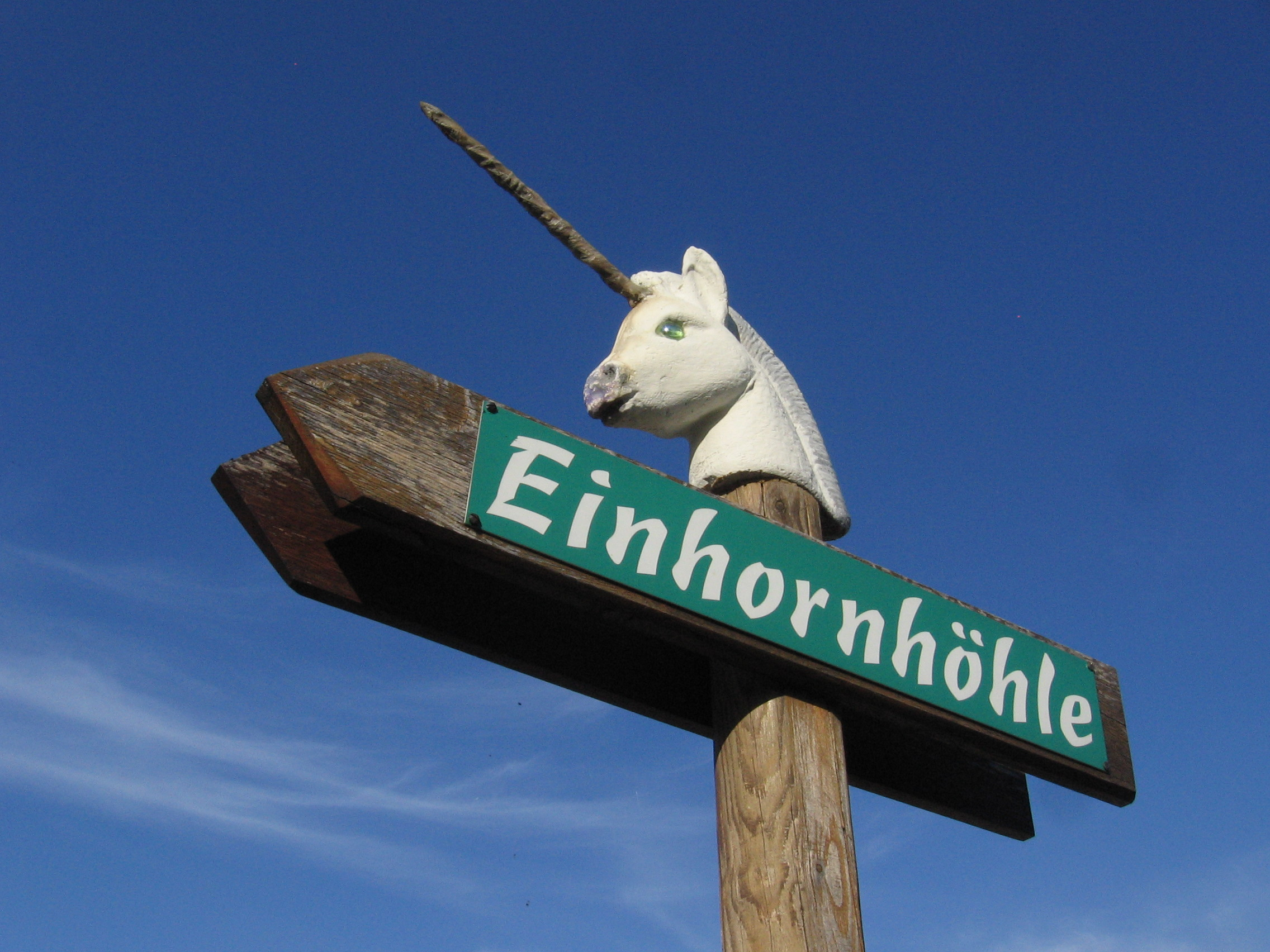
Signpost en route to the cave

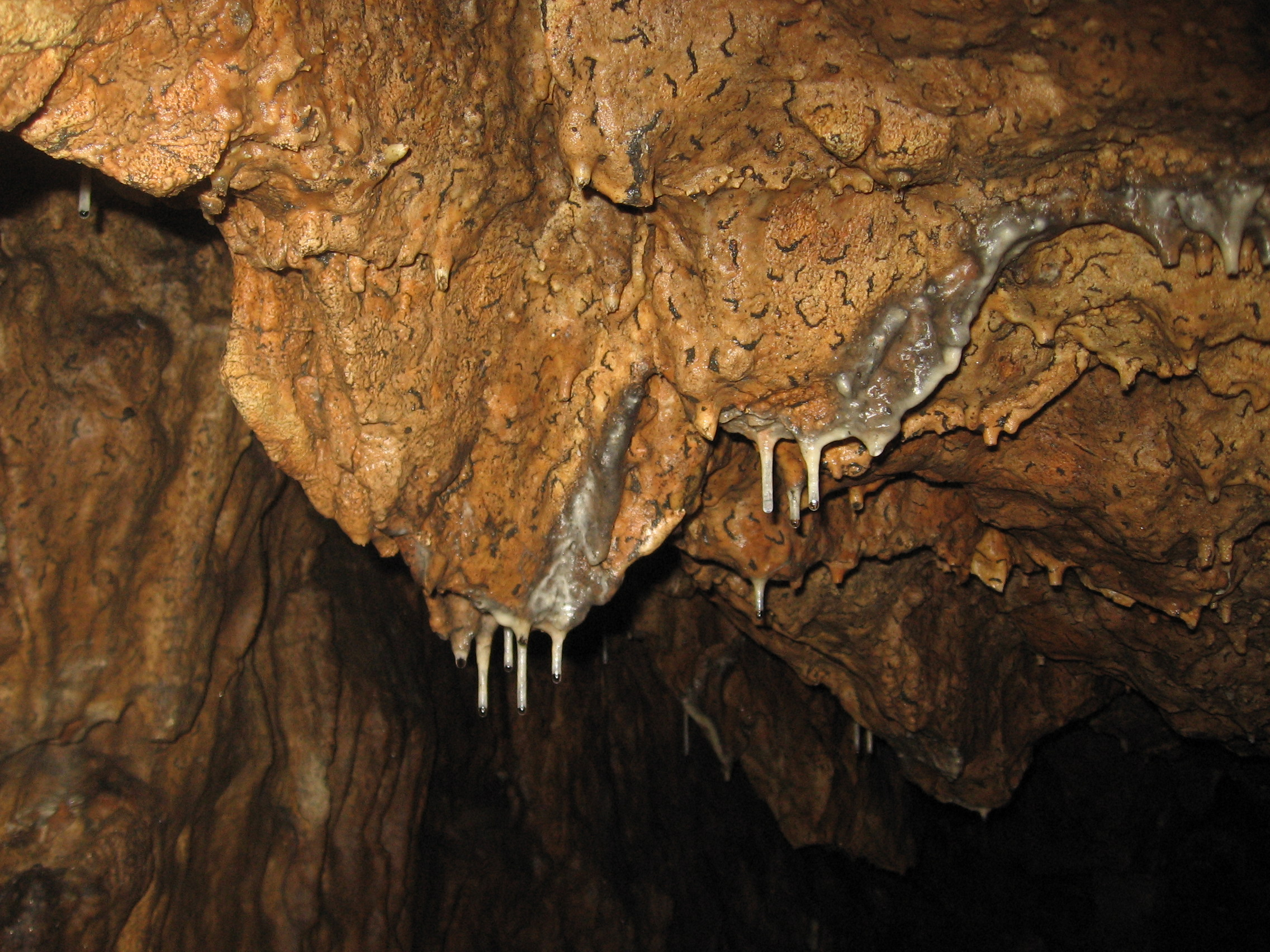
Stalactites

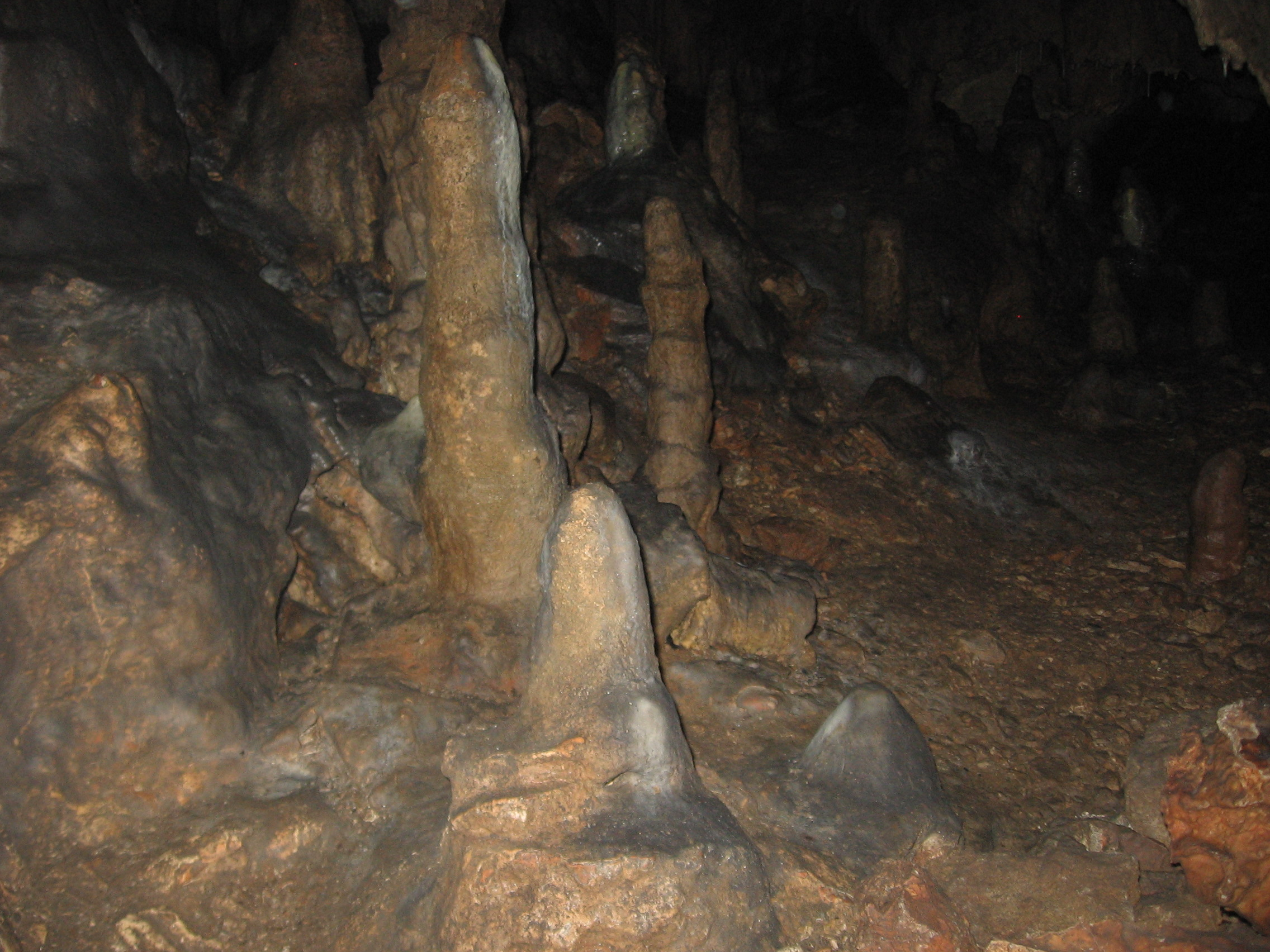
Stalagmites in the Zwergenreich
