= Miesenbach, Lower Austria =

Miesenbach
- Municipality
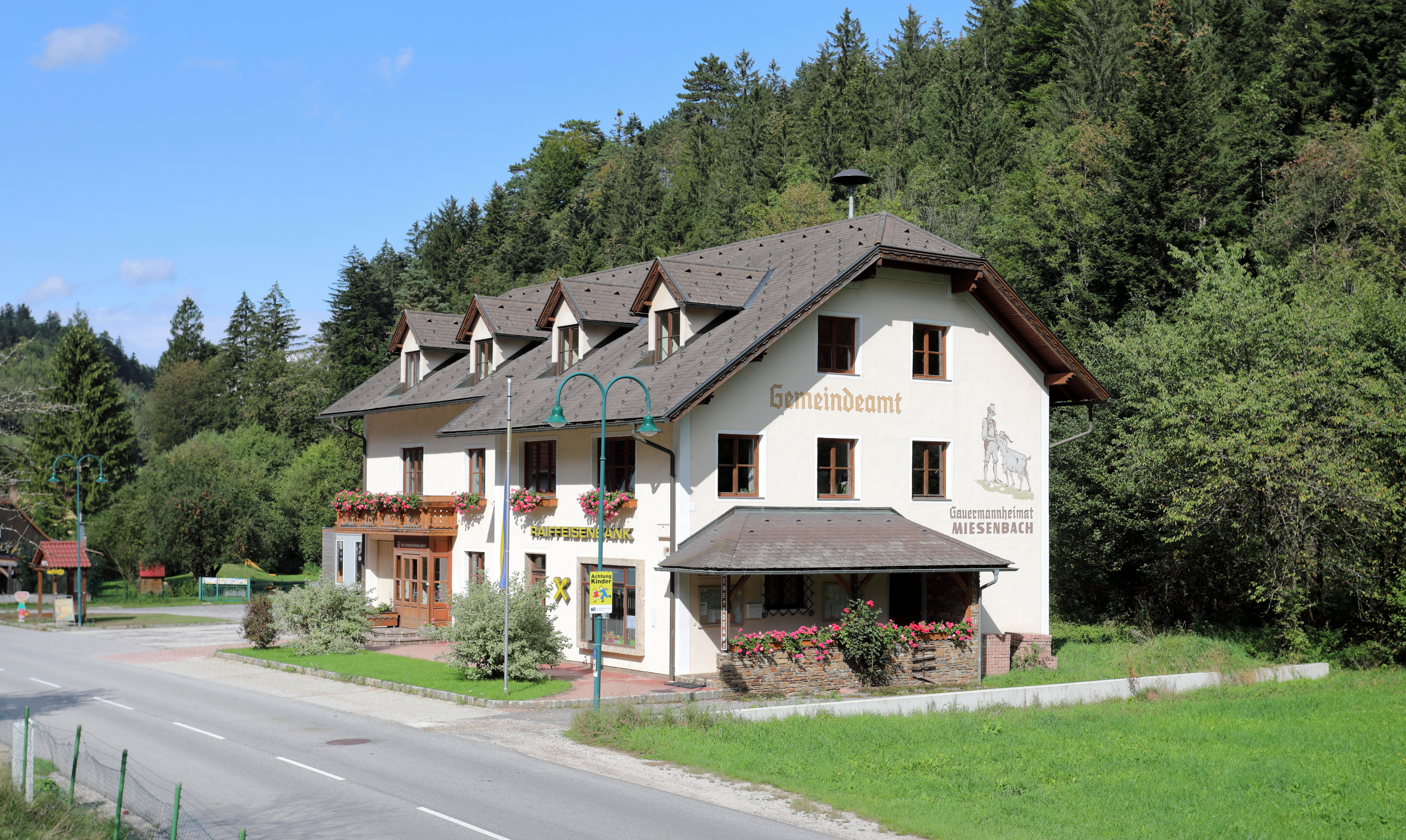
- Miesenbach town hall

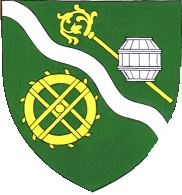
- Coat of arms

- Location within Austria
- Coordinates: 47°50′00″N 15°59′00″E
- Country: Austria
- State: Lower Austria
- District: Wiener Neustadt-Land

Government
  - Mayor: Matthias Scheibenreif (ÖVP)

Area
  - Total: 34.11 km^{2} (13.17 sq mi)
- Elevation: 470 m (1,540 ft)

Population (2018-01-01)
  - Total: 703
  - Density: 20.6/km^{2} (53.4/sq mi)
- Time zone: UTC+1 (CET)
  - Summer (DST): UTC+2 (CEST)
- Postal code: 2761
- Area code: 02632
- Vehicle registration: WB
- Website: www.miesenbach.at

Miesenbach is a municipality in the district of Wiener Neustadt-Land in the Austrian state of Lower Austria, near the mountain ridge of the Dürre Wand.

== Population ==
Historical population
Year	Pop.	±%
1869	958	—
1880	1,120	+16.9%
1890	999	−10.8%
1900	993	−0.6%
1910	989	−0.4%
1923	1,060	+7.2%
1934	996	−6.0%
1939	928	−6.8%
1951	902	−2.8%
1961	819	−9.2%
1971	767	−6.3%
1981	709	−7.6%
1991	722	+1.8%
2001	710	−1.7%
2011	679	−4.4%

'

== Notable residents ==
- Friedrich Gauermann (1807–1862), Biedermeier painter
- Walther Sohm (1909–2001), local historian and dialect scholar
- Clemens Martin Auer (* 1957), politician (ÖVP)
