= Unterberg (Lower Austria) =

Austrian summit

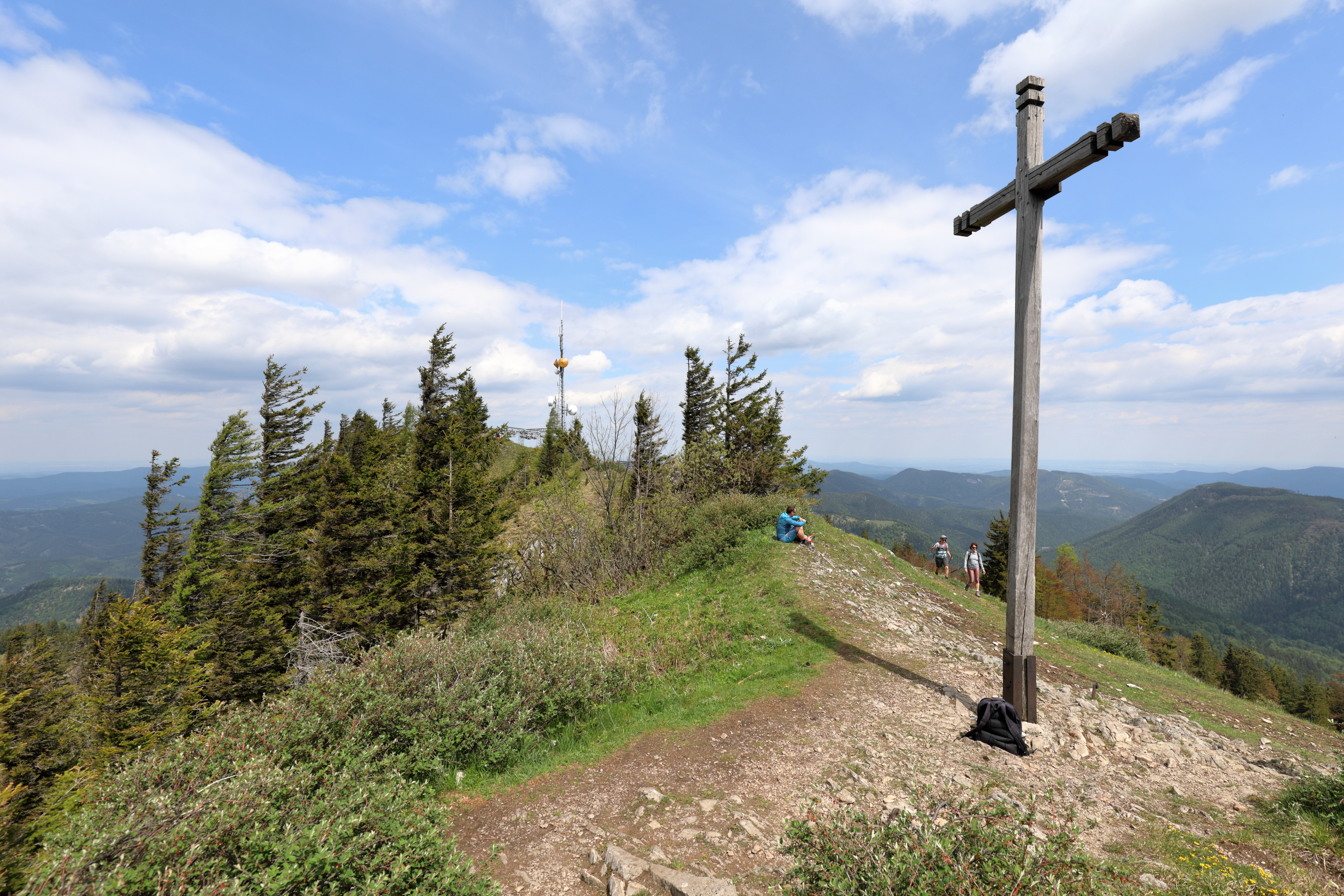
- Summit area with summit cross

Highest point
- Elevation: 1,342 m (AA) (4,403 ft)
- Coordinates: 47°56′18″N 15°49′09″E

Geography
- Location within Austria
- Location: Lower Austria, Austria
- Parent range: Gutenstein Alps

The Unterberg is a prominent summit, 1,342 m above sea level (AA) high, in the Gutenstein Alps in southern Lower Austria. It is located about 10 km south of Hainfeld and is the westernmost and highest summit of a loose chain of mountains that include the Hocheck (1,037 m) and the Kieneck (1,106 m). Its crest continues towards the southwest, albeit less high, to the Brunntaler Höhe (1,090 m) and the Leitermauern (1,025 m).

In a field on the summit there is a chapel with the name of Maria Einsiedl.

The mountain is made of limestone rock and has a steep, wooded face to the northwest which is pierced by crags, whilst to the southeast it falls away only half as sharply. About 150 metres in height below the summit is the mountain hut of Unterberghaus. It is a local winter sports centre with several ski pistes and is popular in spring for ski mountaineering. The ski lift runs up the southeastern flank to the top and may be reached from Pernitz in the Piesting valley via Muggendorf.

The Myrabach stream rises on the eastern side of the Unterberg from the Myralucke and, after a few kilometres, falls over the picturesque Myra Falls into the valley of the River Piesting.
About 8 km south of the Unterberg lies the saddle known as Rohrer Sattel (864 m), an important road link from the Piesting valley and Vienna Basin to the Schneeberg region and the Traisen valley.

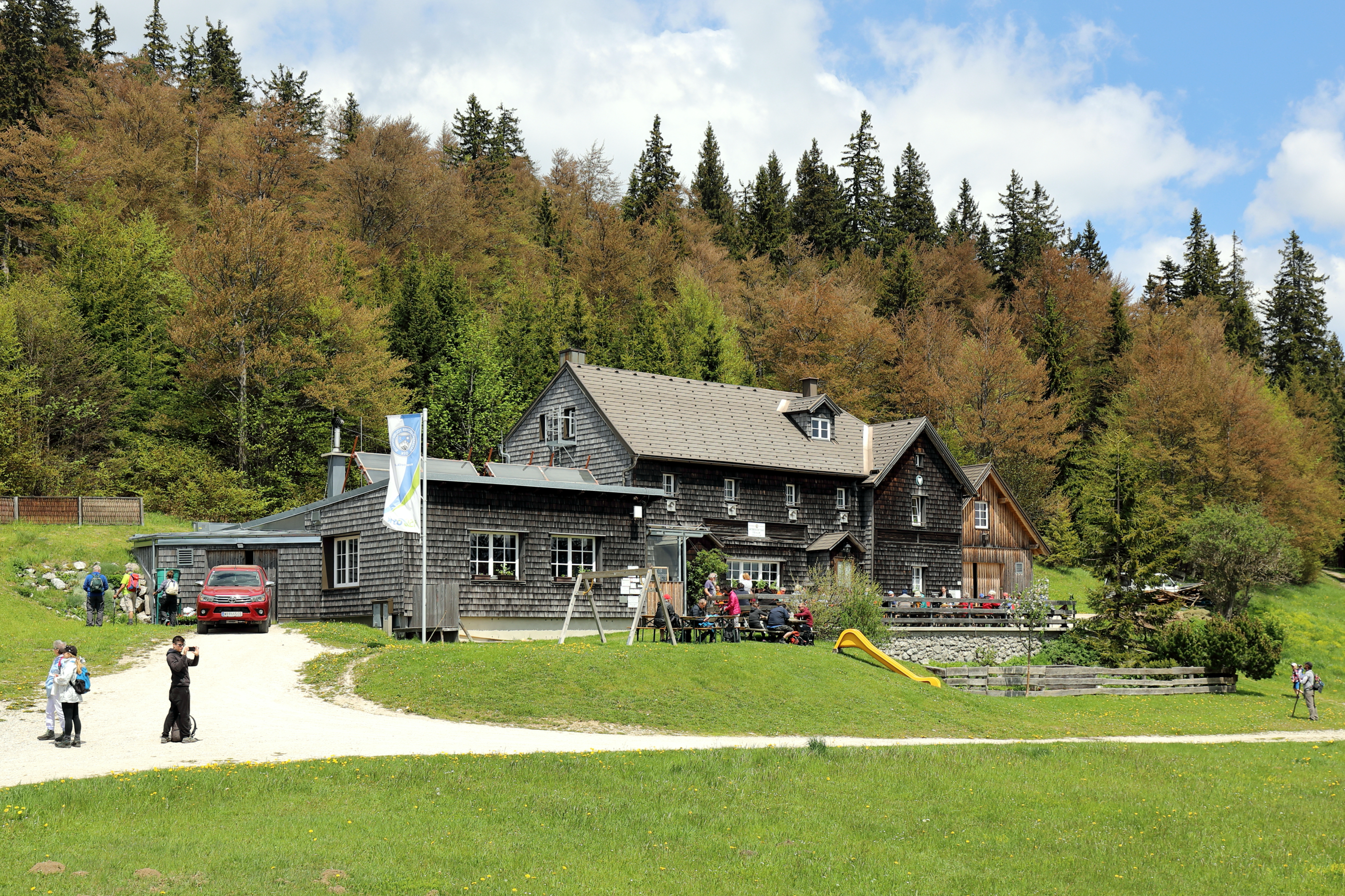
Mountain hut on the Unterberg

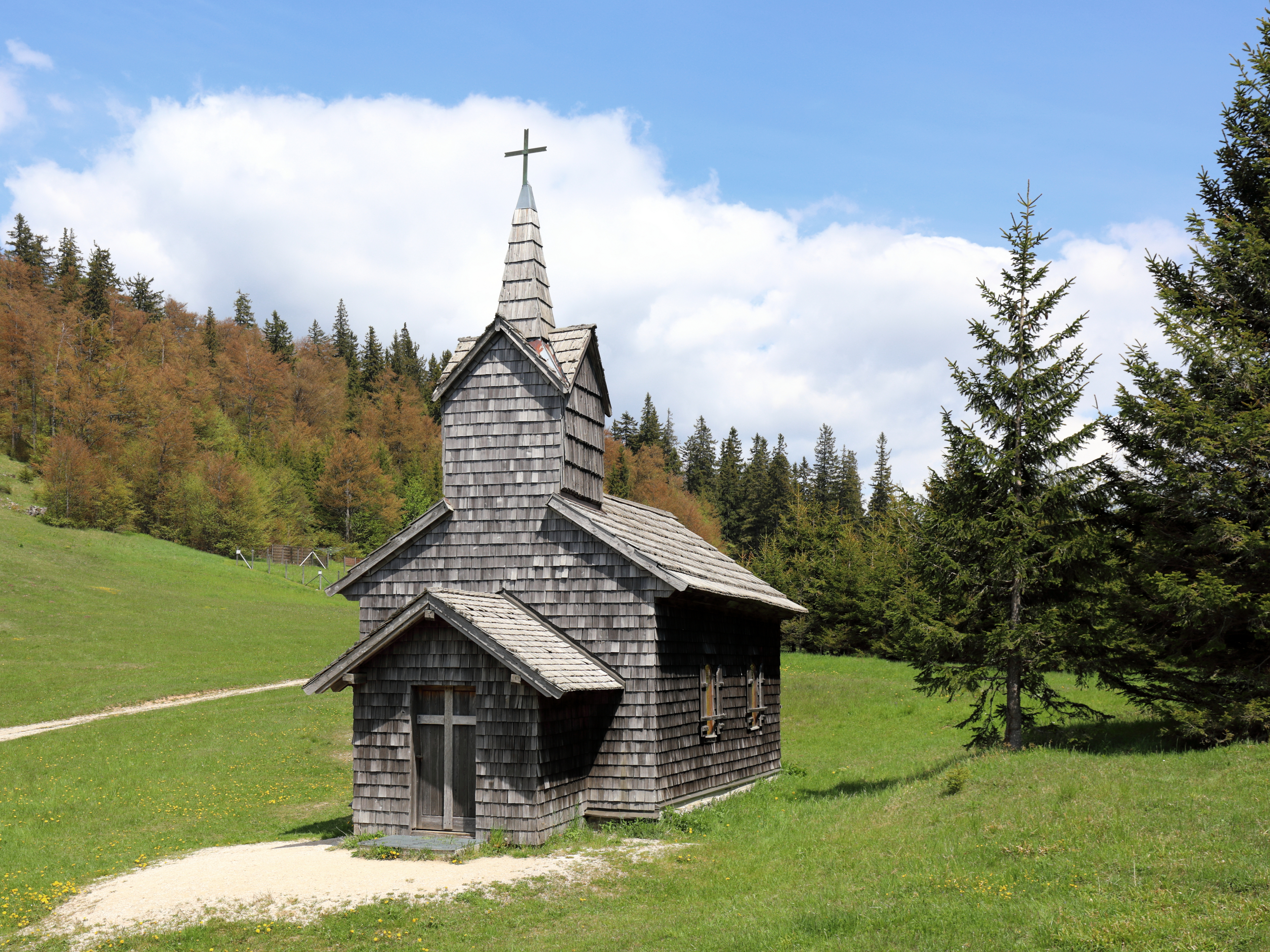
Chapel „Maria Einsiedl“ on the Unterberg

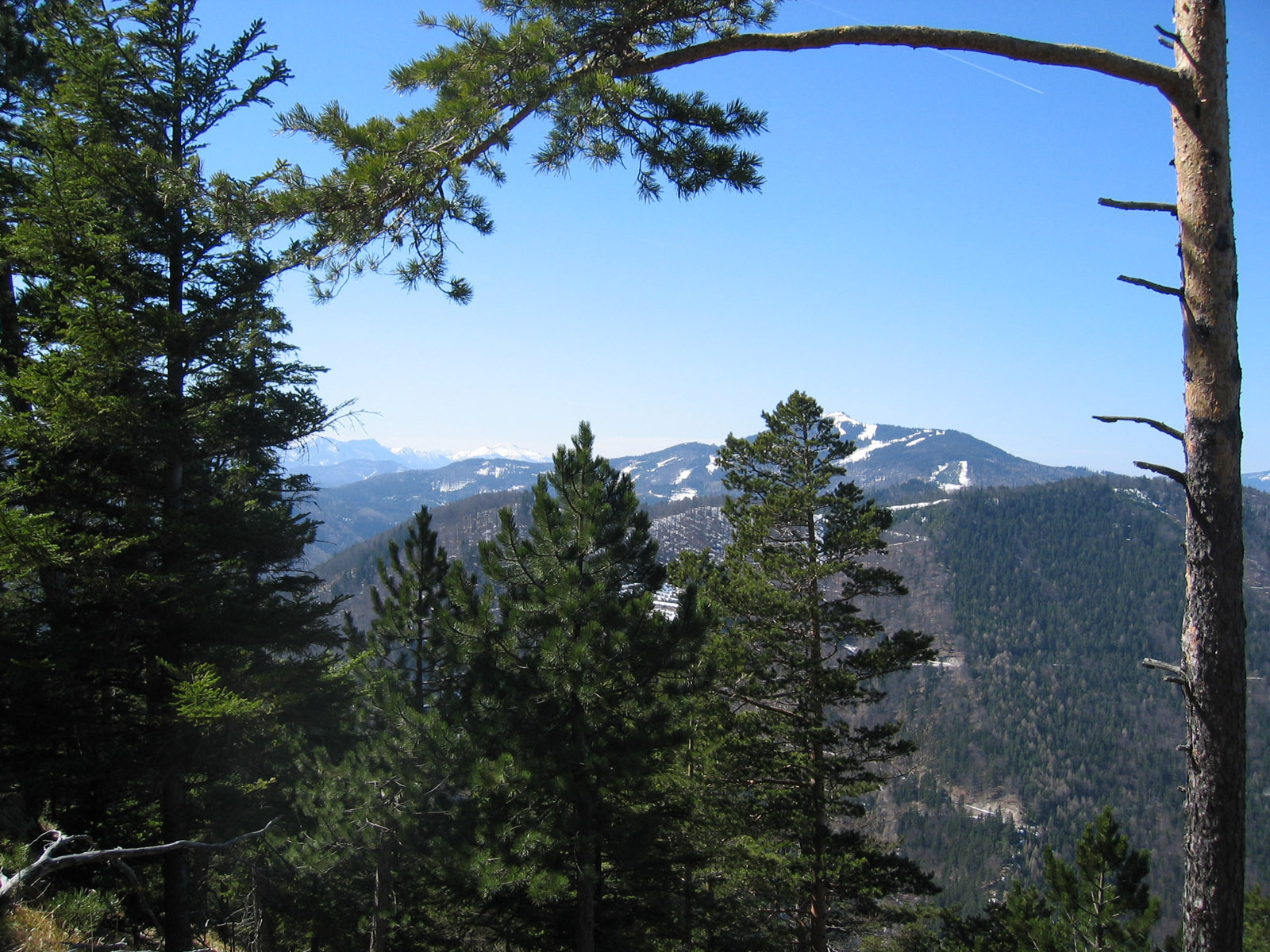
Coniferous forest on the Almeskogel. Right rear: the Unterberg (with ski slopes). Left: the Rax-Schneeberg Group
