= Gutenstein Alps =

Mountain range in Central Europe

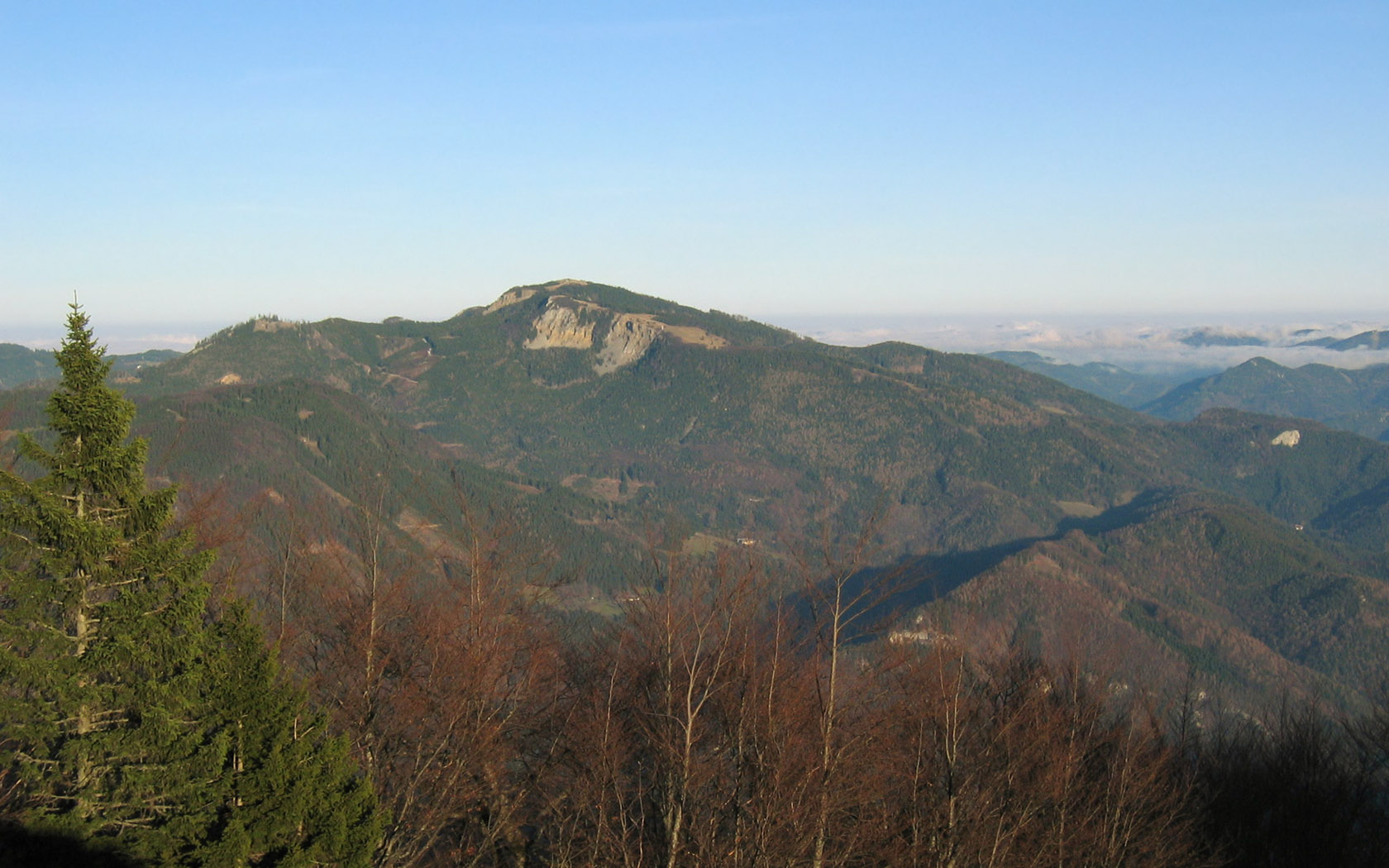
- The Reisalpe (highest mountain in the Gutensteiner Alps) seen from the Türnitzer Höger to the SW

Highest point
- Peak: Reisalpe
- Elevation: 1,399 m above sea level (AA)

Geography
- Location within Austria
- Country: Austria
- Region: Lower Austria
- Range coordinates: 47°57′N 15°39′E
- Parent range: Northern Limestone Alps

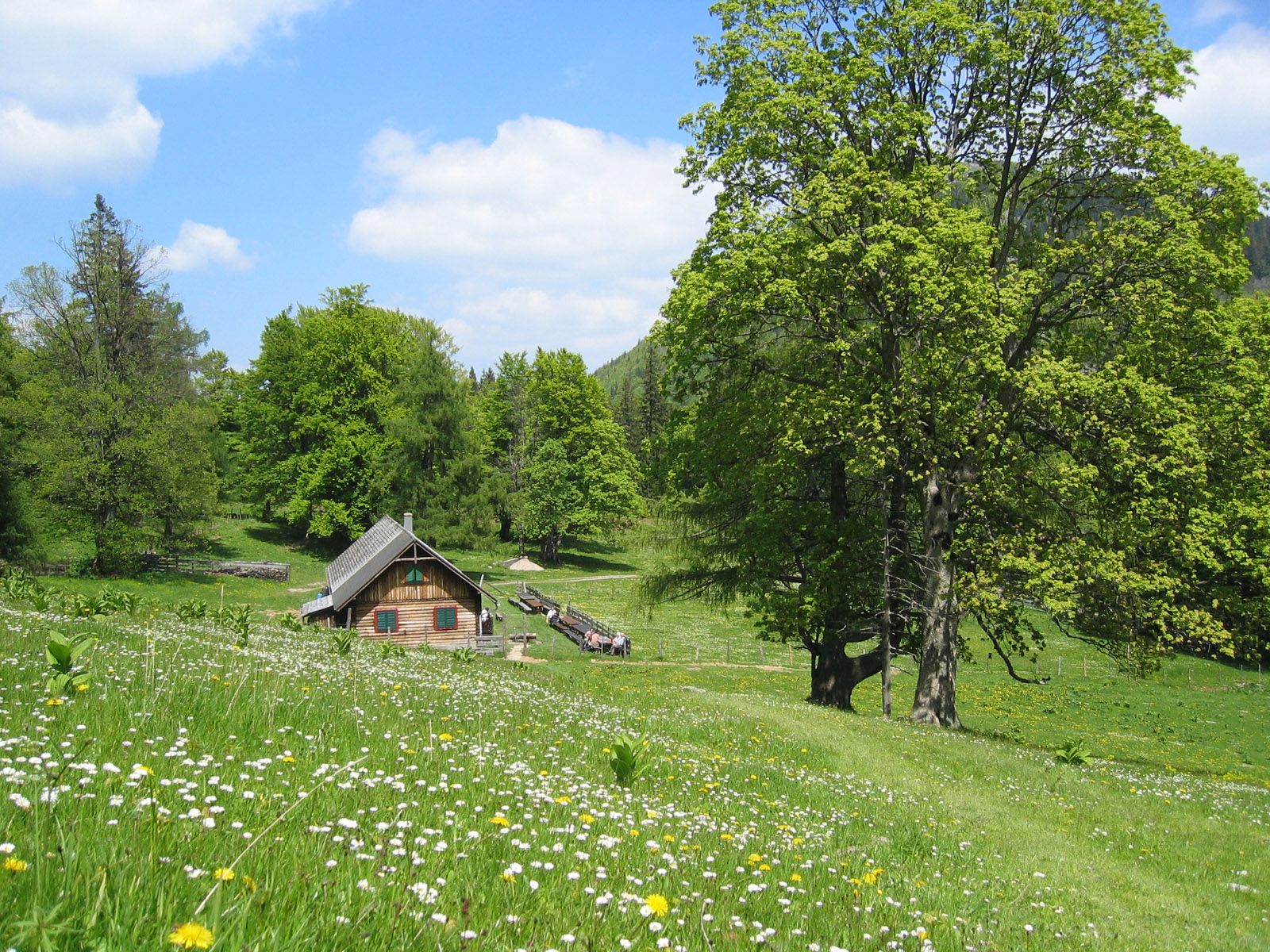
The Kleinzell Hinteralm on the north side of the Reisalpe

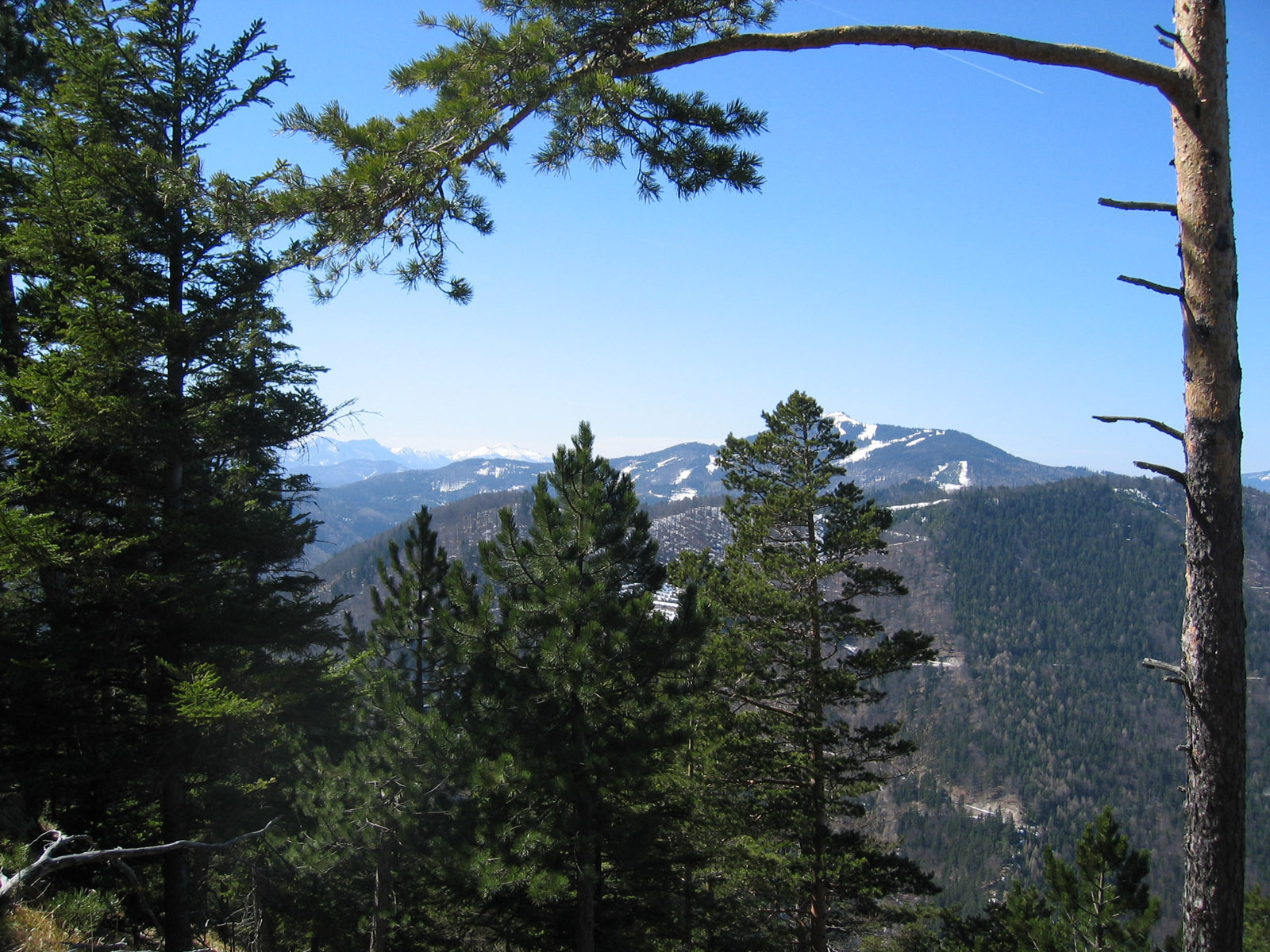
Pine and spruce woods on the Almeskogel (1,061 m); in the background: the Unterberg

The Gutenstein Alps (German: Gutensteiner Alpen) are a mountain range in the Eastern Alps in Central Europe, and the northeasternmost part of the Northern Limestone Alps, reaching heights over 1,000 m.

== Topography ==
Die Gutenstein Alps are separated in the north from the Vienna Woods by the valleys of the Gölsen and Triesting. In the east they descend to the Vienna Basin. Their boundary with the Rax-Schneeberg Group to the south is formed by the valley of the Sierningbach between Ternitz and Puchberg am Schneeberg, the saddle near the Mamauwiese and the Voisbach and Schwarza valleys. To the west, from the Seebach stream near St. Aegyd am Neuwalde, the boundary with the Türnitz Alps runs along the Unrecht Traisen and the Traisen.

The highest elevations in the Gutenstein Alps are, from west to east:

- Kloster-Hinteralpe (1311 m) and the Muckenkogel (1248 m)
- Reisalpe (1399 m) and Hochstaff (1305 m)
- Handlesberg (1370 m) near Schwarzau im Gebirge
- Jochart (1266 m)
- Unterberg (1342 m)
- Katharinenschlag (1222 m) and Schober (1213 m) on the Dürre Wand
- Plackles (1132 m) on the Hohe Wand

Near Ebenwald, in the municipality of Kleinzell, is the northernmost thousander in the Alps: the Sengenebenberg (1,104 m).

The eastern part of the Gutenstein Alps is split by the valley of the River Piesting. Other important rivers are the Traisen in the west, the Gölsen and the Triesting in the north and the Schwarza south of the mountain range.

== Geology ==
Most of the Gutenstein Alps consists of limestones of the Eastern Alpine formation (Decke), in particular, Gutenstein limestone and dolomite from the lower and middle Triassic. These relatively coarse-grained rocks almost always indicate a significant layering (Bankung) and a number of coloured layers. In the southeast and northwest, conglomerate rock from the Cretaceous period is found.

Numerous caves are found in the limestone rock. Of these, the Unicorn Cave in Dreistetten and the Eisenstein Cave in Brunn an der Schneebergbahn are show caves which are accessible to the public.

Gutenstein dolomite is so named after its occurrence in this region. It may be fine and coarse-grained and contain siliceous or argillaceous components. The gray to brown, usually layered sediment was formed in the lagoons of the Triassic and is related to Bunt dolomite. Its highly variable forms are common in the west as far as the Dachstein Mountains.

== Landscape and settlement ==
With the exception of the Piesting valley (municipalities of Gutenstein, Pernitz, Markt Piesting) and the Puchberg Basin, only the valleys on the edge of the Gutenstein Alps and the plains on the eastern edge are densely populated. Important places are Traisen, Hainfeld and Berndorf in the north, Wöllersdorf, Neunkirchen and Ternitz in the east, and St. Aegyd am Neuwalde and Lilienfeld in the west.

Most of the Gutenstein Alps is heavily wooded and is used for forestry. Spruce and larch dominate the higher places. Lower down the mountains, beech is the dominant species together with pine in the drier areas. The district of Lilienfeld, which incorporates the northwestern part of the Gutenstein Alps, has the highest percentage of forest of all the districts in Austria.

== Tourism ==
The Gutenstein Alps are an important recreational area for the population of the urban areas of Vienna, Wiener Neustadt and St. Pölten. In particular, the Hohe Wand in the east is accessible by a variety of paths, scrambles and climbs, and has numerous mountain inns and huts. Especially popular are the Myra Falls and Steinwandklamm Gorge (between Pernitz and Furth). There are ski slopes in the area of the Muckenkogel near Lilienfeld and in the south-eastern of the Unterberg.
