= Piesting =

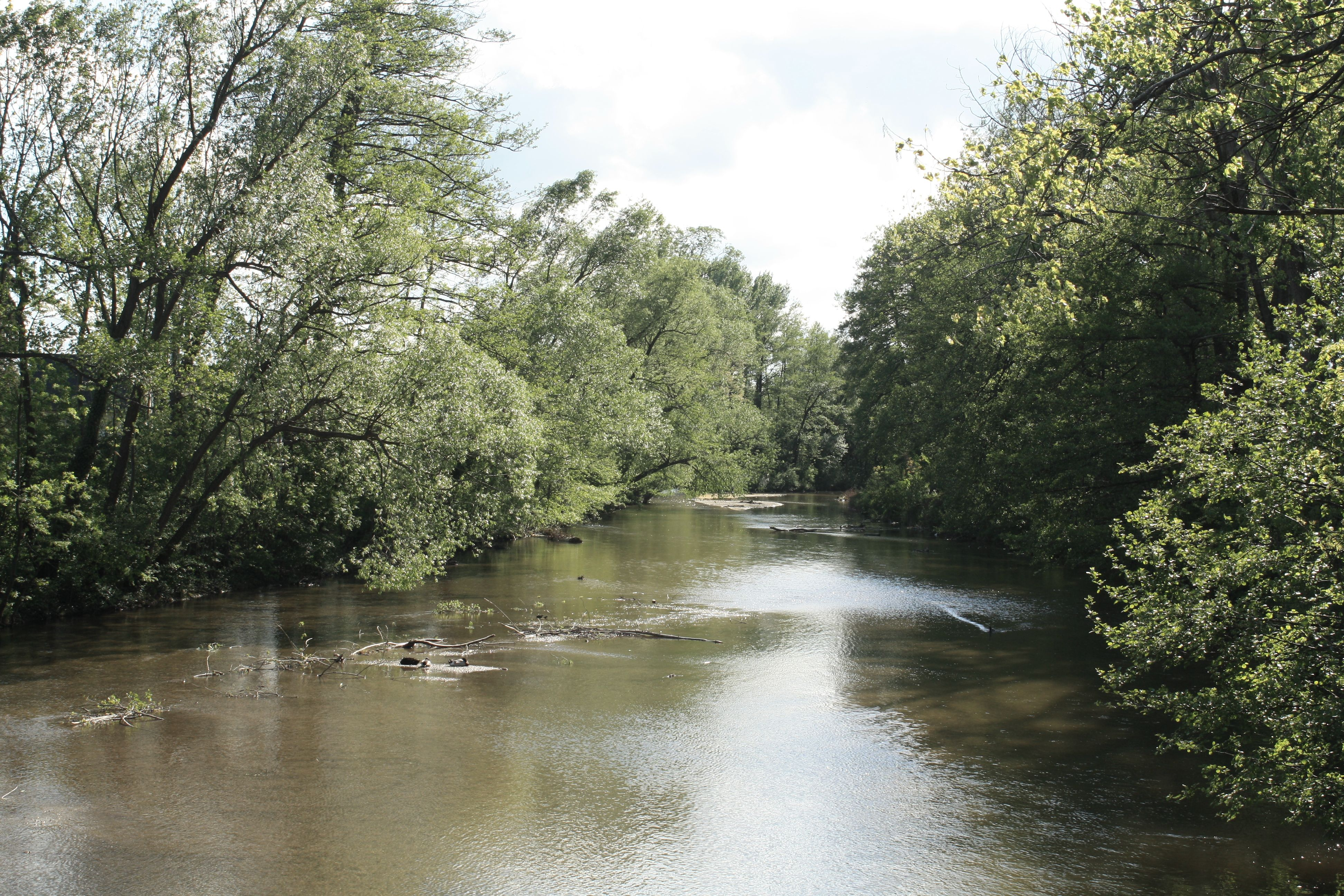
- The Piesting near Sollenau

Location
- Country: Austria
- State: Lower Austria

Physical characteristics
- Mouth
  - location: Fischa at Gramatneusiedl
  - coordinates: 48.0201°N 16.4944°E
- Length: 77.1 km (47.9 mi)
- Basin size: 348 km^{2} (134 sq mi)

Basin features
- Progression: Fischa→ Danube→ Black Sea

The Piesting is a river in southern Lower Austria. A left tributary of the Fischa, its drainage basin is 348 km^{2} (134 sq mi).

The sources of the Piesting are the Kalte Gang, the Steinapiesting, and the Längapiesting, which begin south of the Schneeberg. These rivers meet in Gutenstein in the Gutenstein Alps. From there the Piesting flows east through Markt Piesting and Wöllersdorf and into the Viennese Basin.

The tributary Myrabach discharges at Pernitz into the Piesting. Between the Hohe Mandling (967 m (3,173 ft)) in the north and the Großer Kitzberg (771 m (2,530 ft)) in the south, the Piesting breaks through the Quarb, a rocky ravine, and flows further eastwards through Markt Piesting and Wöllersdorf into the Vienna Basin. Near Gramatneusiedl the Piesting discharges into the Fischa.

The valley west of the Thermenlinie (the thermal line at the Vienna Basin) in the Gutenstein Alps is known as the Piesting Valley.

== See also ==
- Markt Piesting
