= Gutenstein =

Gutenstein may refer to:

- Gutenstein, Austria, a town
- Gutenstein (Sigmaringen), a district of Sigmaringen, Baden-Württemberg, Germany
- Gutenstein Alps, a mountain range in central Europe
- Ravne na Koroškem (German: Gutenstein in Kärnten), a town in Slovenia
