= Myra Falls (Lower Austria) =

Waterfalls in Muggendorf, Lower Austria, Austria

Coordinates: 47°54′52″N 15°56′7″E

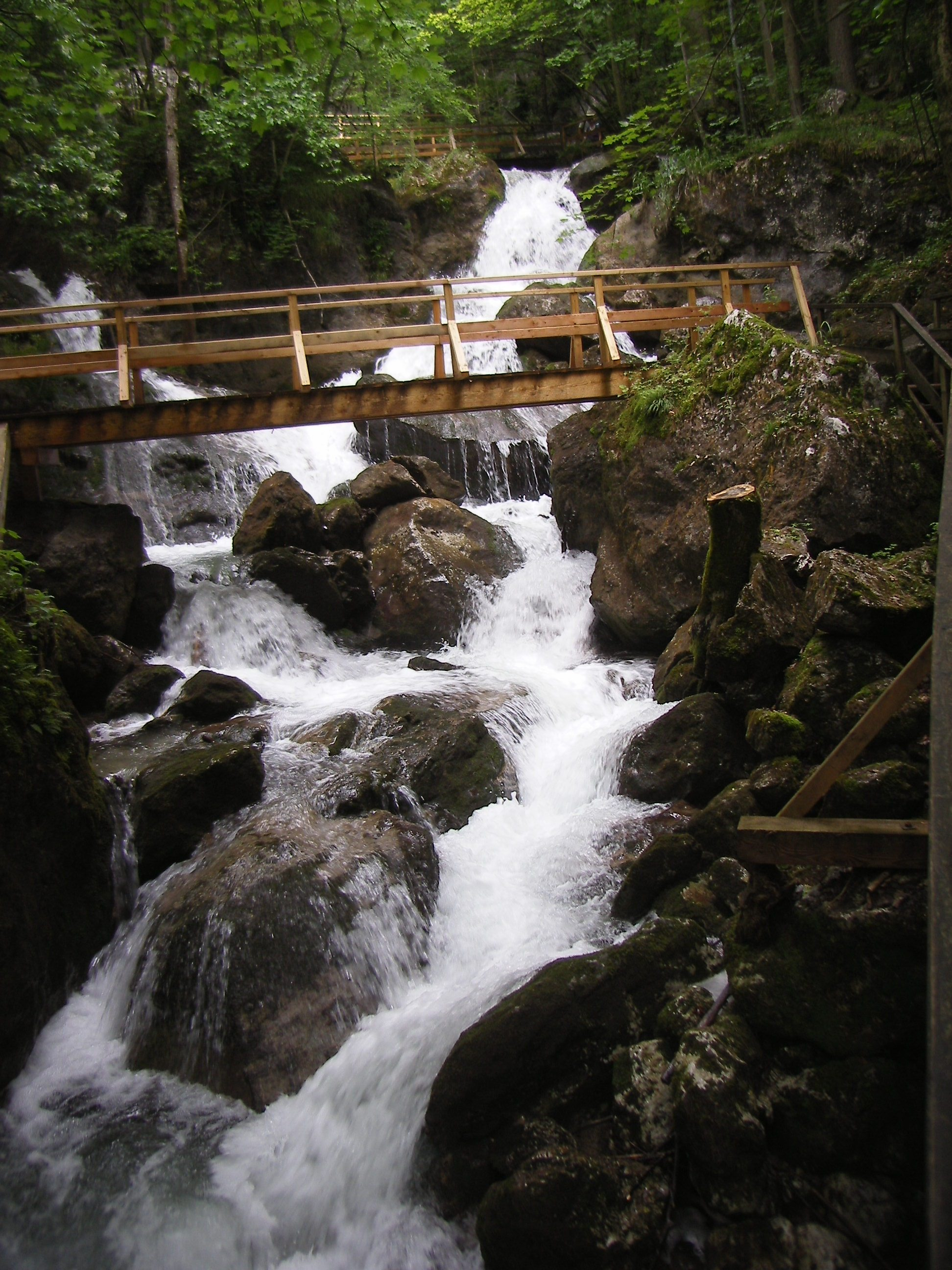
Footbridge over the Myra Falls

The Myra Falls (German: Myrafälle or rarer: Mirafälle; always pronounced with a German "i") are located in a ravine in the municipality of Muggendorf in the Austrian federal state of Lower Austria (N.B. not to be confused with the Mira Falls (Mirafall) 50 km (31 mi) farther west in the Ötschergräben). The ravine has been cut by the Myrabach, a small tributary of the Piesting. The Myra, as the stream is also known, rises at the foot of the Unterberg from the Myralucke, a spring steeped in legend, that is fed by an underground lake. Although the Myra is only a few kilometres long, it used to power a large number of mills and sawmills in the Myra valley.

In 1899 plans were laid for "the exploitation of this waterfall for industrial purposes and thus the destruction of a natural beauty".

In 1912 Lord Oskar of Rosthorn (Oskar Edler von Rosthorn) built a small pumped-storage power station at the Myra Falls, that was in operation until 1974/1975.

The actual ravine with the falls is about 600 metres (2,000 ft) long; its height difference is 70 metres (230 ft). The gorge runs from north to south and is protected as a natural monument. The subsoil of the gorge is limestone. The Myrabach falls in several cascades through the gorge. At the upper and lower end the water is impounded into a small pond.

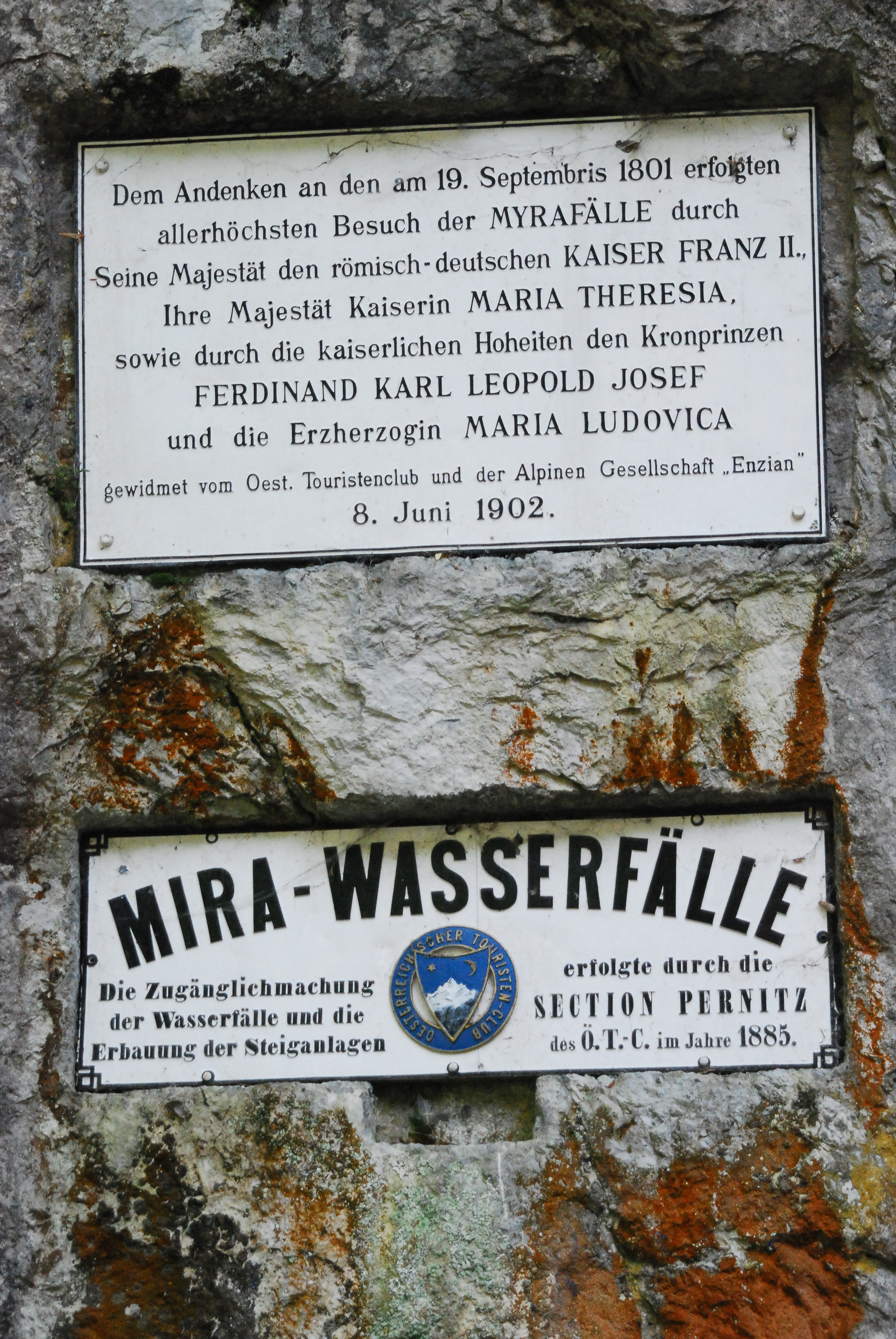
Commemorative plaques at the entrance to the Myra Falls

A well-developed and popular hiking trail leads through the gorge. It was built in 1885 by the Pernitz branch of the Austrian Tourist Club (Österreichischer Touristenklub), with 19 bridges and 8 ascents (opened: 9 August 1885) and looked after them since then.

There are two commemorative plaques at the entrance to the Myra Falls. The first recalls the "opening up of the falls and the construction of the ascents by the Pernitz Branch of the Ö. TC". The second panel is dedicated "to the memory of the visit to the Myra Falls on 19 September 1801 by His Majesty the Roman-German Emperor, Francis II, Her Majesty Empress Maria Theresa, and by Their Imperial Highnesses, the Crown Prince Ferdinand Karl Leopold Joseph and Archduchess Maria Ludoica, donated by Aust. Tourist Club and the "Enzian" Alpine Society on 8 June 1902."

There are restaurants at the top and bottom of the gorge. The entrance to the gorge may easily be reached on foot or by car (car park) and is located about 300 metres (980 ft) north of the village of Muggendorf.

The Myra ends shortly after the falls at Pernitz where it joins the Piesting.

== Postage stamp ==
On 7 December 1977 the Österreichische Post brought out a definitive stamp on this subject in their Austrian landscape series to the value of 20.00 shillings.

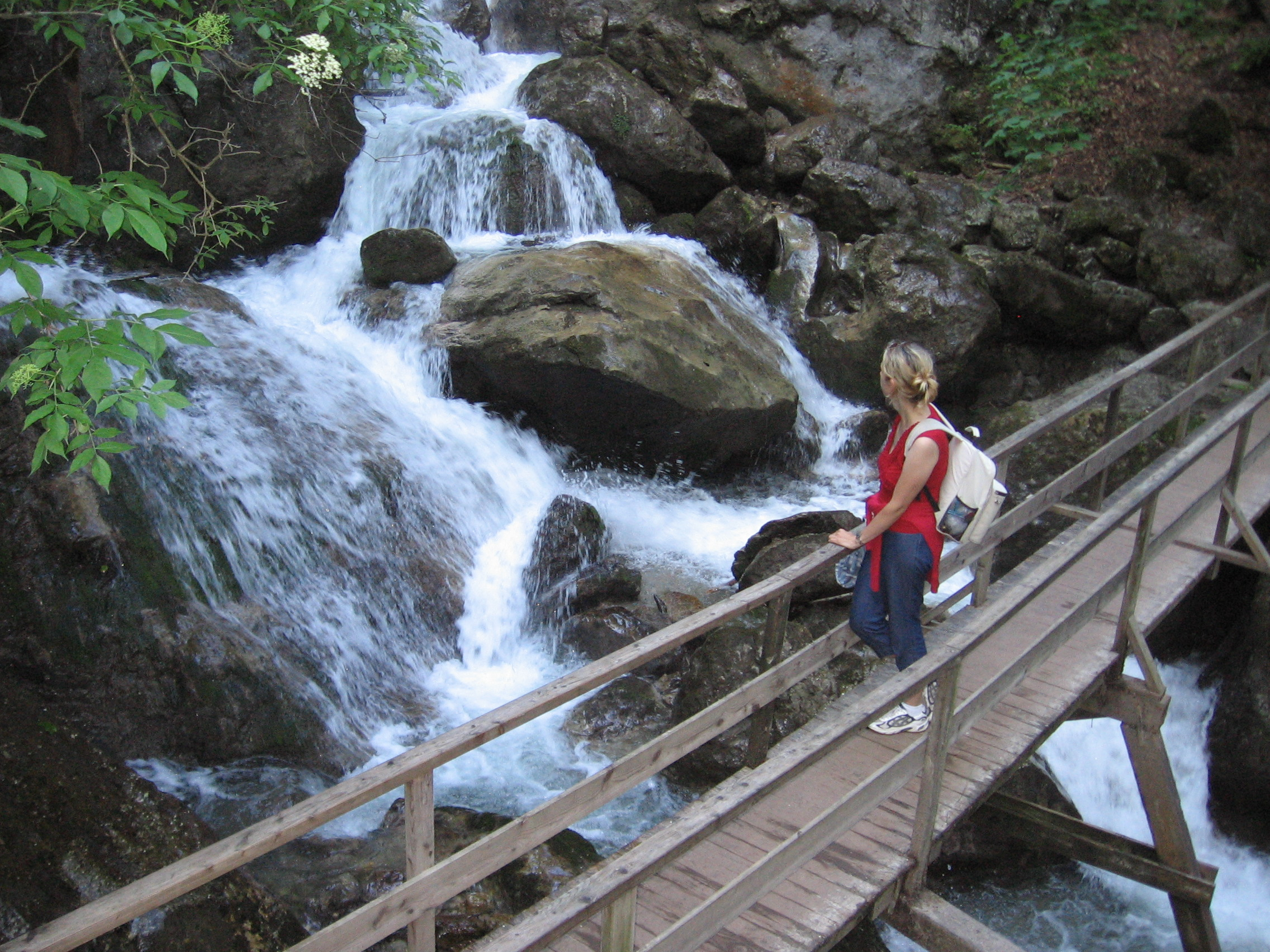
Walkway at the Myra Falls

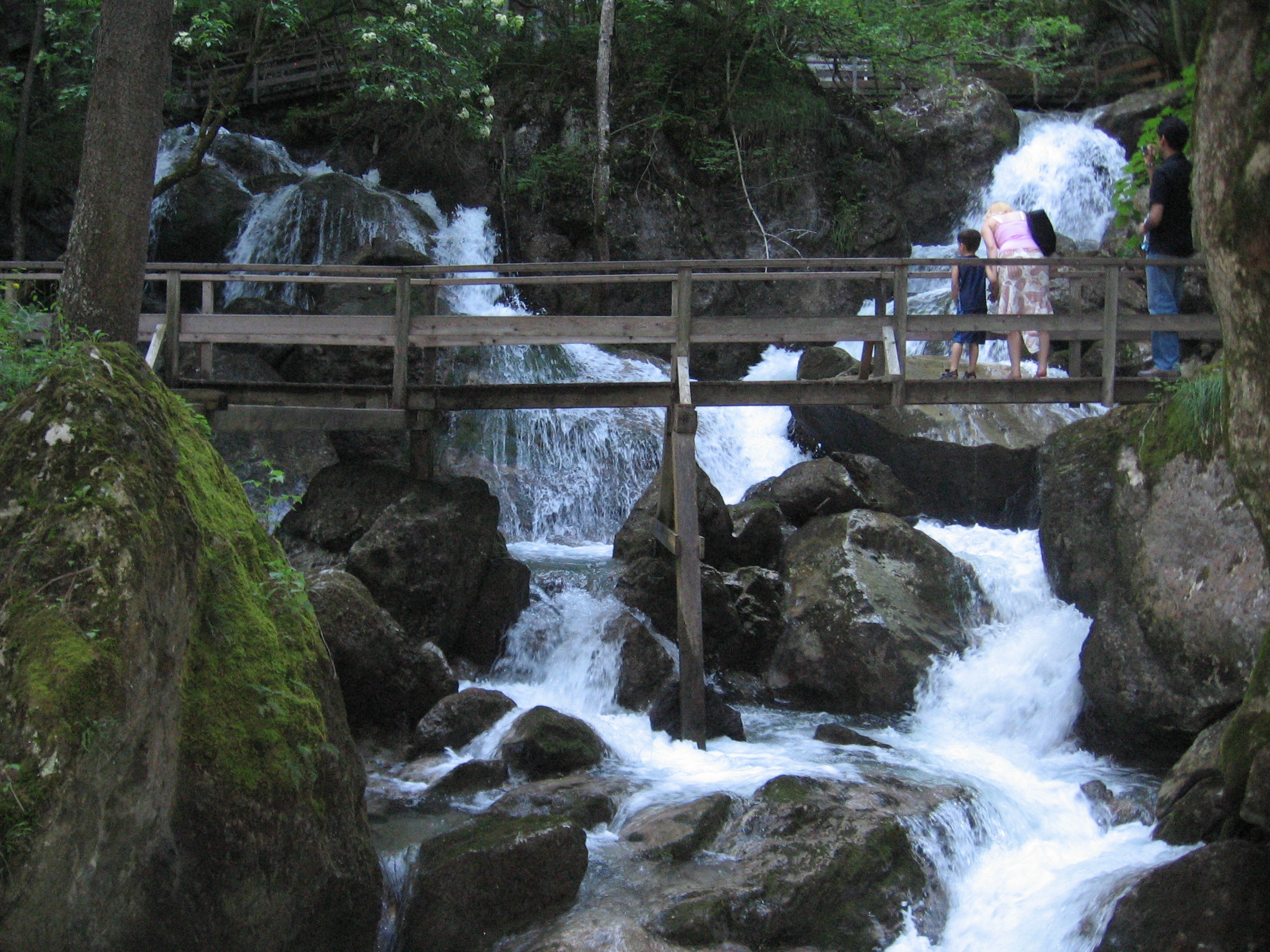
Footbridge over the Myra Falls

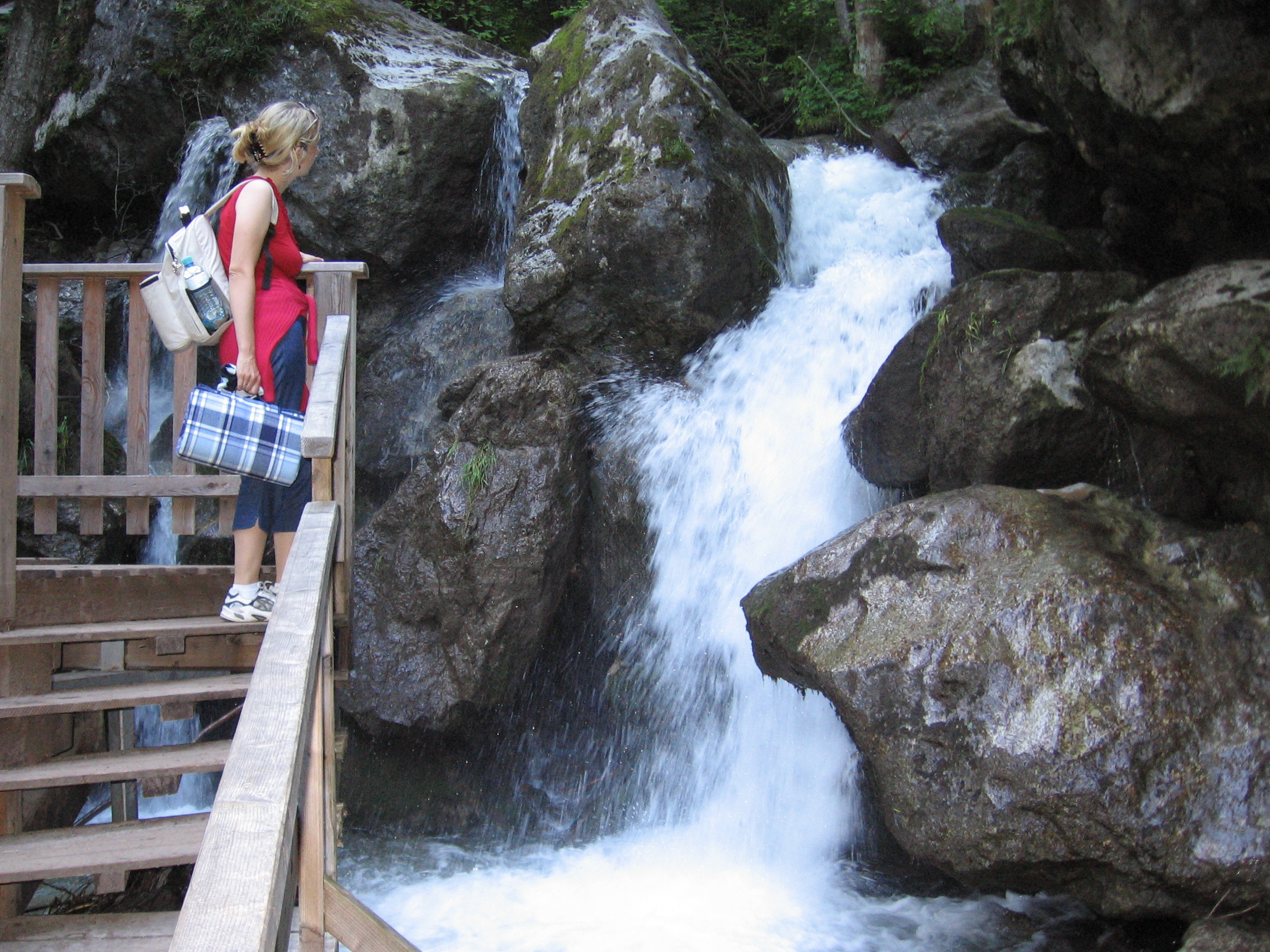
Walkway at the Myra Falls
