= Vexillum schafferi =

Scientific classification
- Kingdom: Animalia
- Phylum: Mollusca
- Class: Gastropoda
- Subclass: Caenogastropoda
- Order: Neogastropoda
- Superfamily: Turbinelloidea
- Family: Costellariidae
- Genus: Vexillum
- Species: †V. schafferi

Binomial name
- †Vexillum schafferi (Meznerics, 1933)

Species of gastropod

Vexillum schafferi is an extinct species of sea snail, a marine gastropod mollusk, in the family Costellariidae, the ribbed miters.

== Distribution ==
Fossils of this marine species were found in middle Miocene strata in the Vienna Basin the former Paratethys Sea (Slovakia).
