= Vexillum neudorfense =

Scientific classification
- Kingdom: Animalia
- Phylum: Mollusca
- Class: Gastropoda
- Subclass: Caenogastropoda
- Order: Neogastropoda
- Superfamily: Turbinelloidea
- Family: Costellariidae
- Genus: Vexillum
- Species: †V. neudorfense

Binomial name
- †Vexillum neudorfense (Schaffer, 1897)

Synonyms
- Mitra neudorfensis Schaffer, 1897

Species of gastropod

Vexillum neudorfense is an extinct species of sea snail, a marine gastropod mollusk, in the family Costellariidae, the ribbed miters.

== Distribution ==
Fossils of this marine species were found in middle Miocene strata of the Vienna Basin, Western Carpathians, Slovakia.
