= Vexillum nitidum =

- Shell of Vexillum nitidum

Scientific classification
- Kingdom: Animalia
- Phylum: Mollusca
- Class: Gastropoda
- Subclass: Caenogastropoda
- Order: Neogastropoda
- Superfamily: Turbinelloidea
- Family: Costellariidae
- Genus: Vexillum
- Species: †V. nitidum

Binomial name
- †Vexillum nitidum (Schaffer, 1897)

Synonyms
- † Mitra nitida Schaffer, 1897; † Uromitra nitida (L.M.D. Bellardi, 1887)

Species of gastropod

Vexillum nitidum is an extinct species of sea snail, a marine gastropod mollusk, in the family Costellariidae, the ribbed miters.

== Description ==
The length attains 26 mm (1.0 in), its diameter 9 mm (0.35 in).

== Distribution ==
Fossils of this marine species were found in middle Miocene strata of the Vienna Basin, Western Carpathians, Slovakia; also in Tuscany, Italy.
