= Kleinzell =

- Municipality
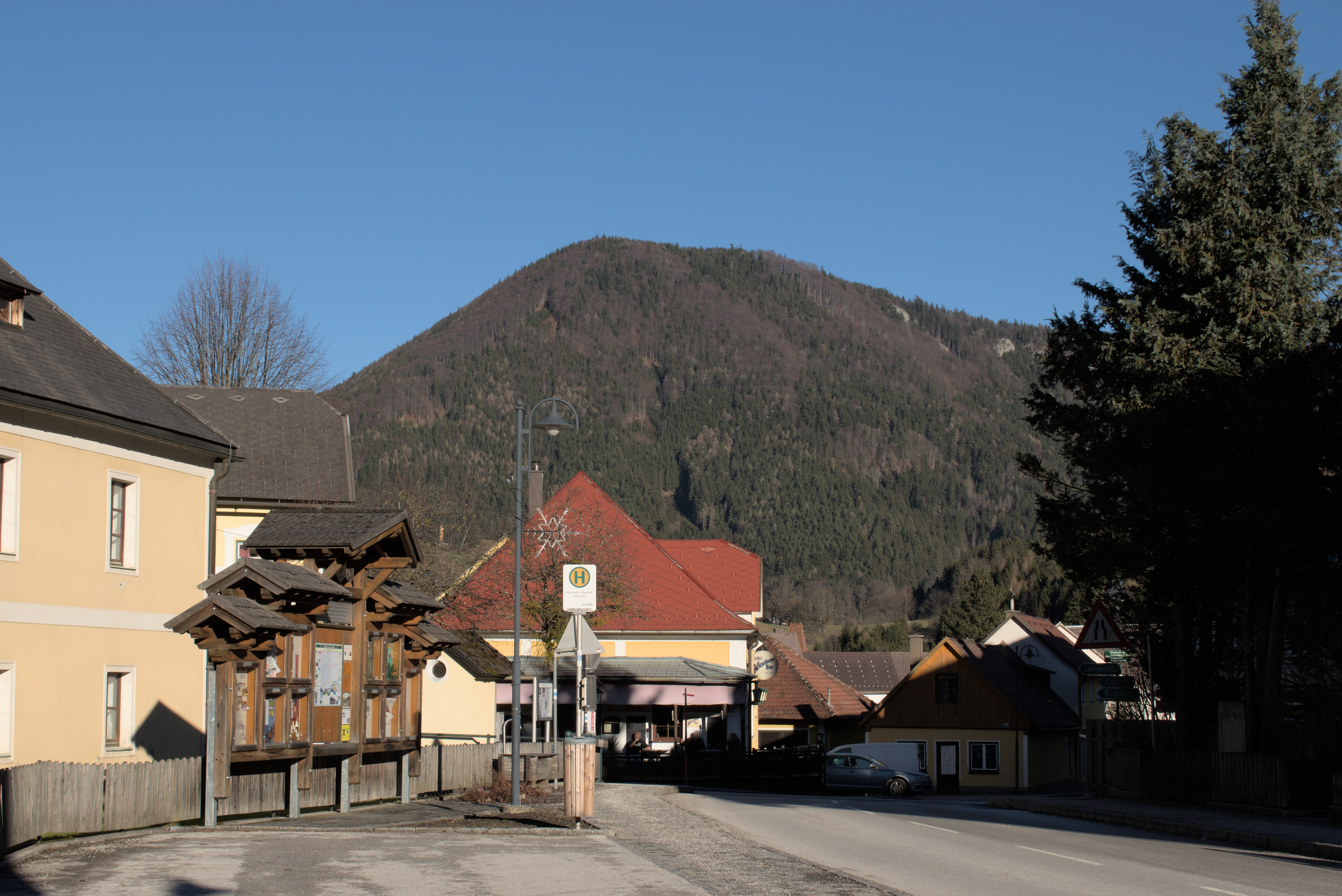
- Kleinzell village centre

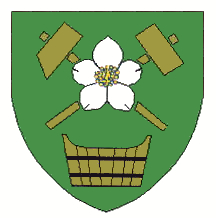
- Coat of arms

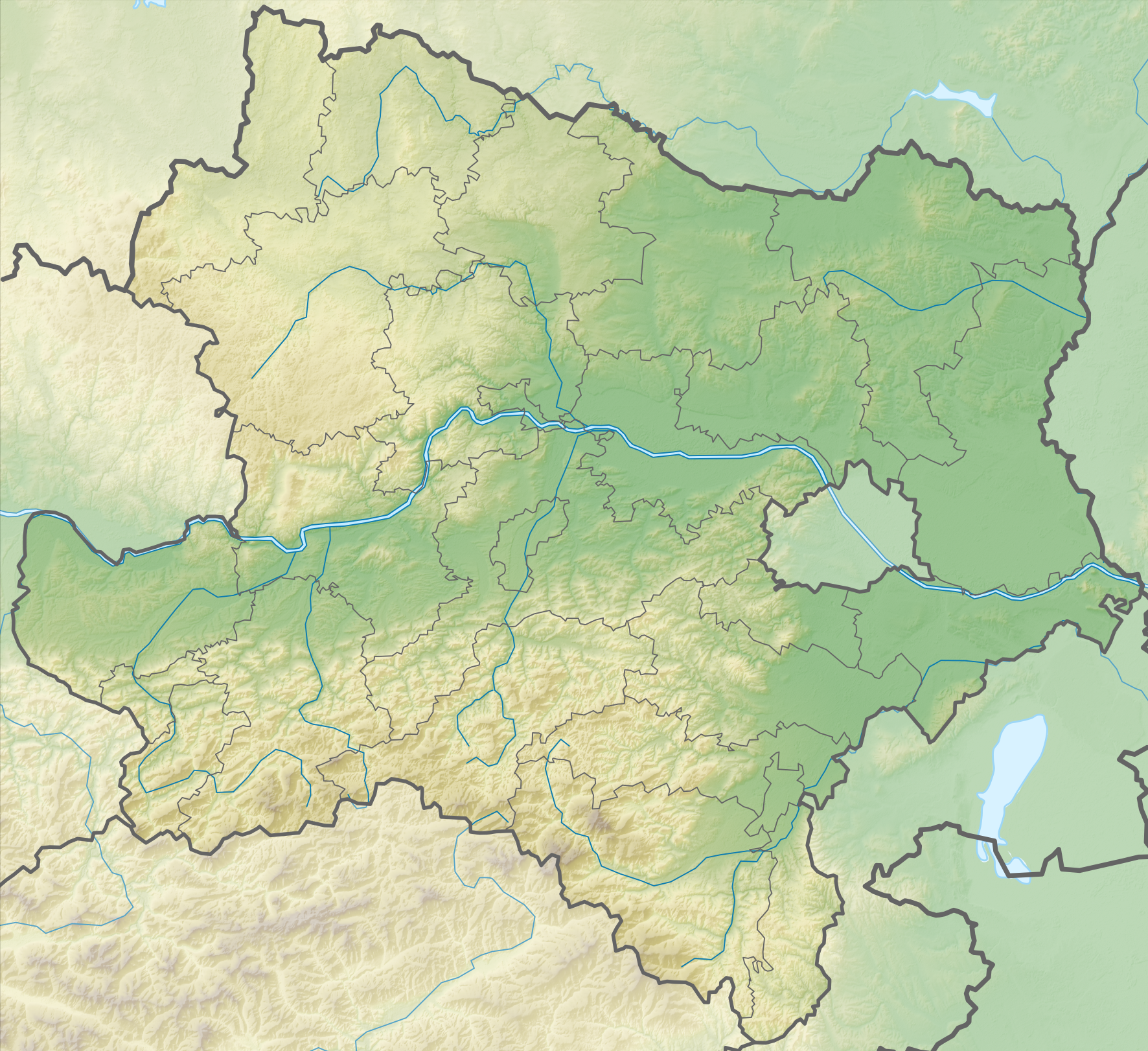
- Location within Austria Location within Lower Austria
- Coordinates: 47°59′N 15°45′E
- Country: Austria
- State: Lower Austria
- District: Lilienfeld

Government
  - Mayor: Reinhard Hagen (ÖVP)

Area
  - Total: 93.09 km^{2} (35.94 sq mi)
- Elevation: 480 m (1,570 ft)
- Highest elevation: 1,399 m (4,590 ft)

Population (2025-01-01)
  - Total: 854
  - Density: 9.17/km^{2} (23.8/sq mi)
- Time zone: UTC+1 (CET)
  - Summer (DST): UTC+2 (CEST)
- Postal code: 3171
- Area code: 02766
- Website: https://www.kleinzell.gv.at

Kleinzell is a town in the district of Lilienfeld in the Austrian state of Lower Austria.

== Geography ==
Kleinzell is the third largest municipality in the district of Lilienfeld with a size of about 93.09km². Kleinzell is situated in the Halbachtal in the Gutenstein Alps about 55 kilometres southwest of Vienna and 25 kilometres south of Sankt Pölten. The municipal area is mountainous, the highest mountains include the Reisalpe (1399m) and the Hochstaff (1305m).

The proportion of forest in the municipal area is very high at 84.7%. 11.9% are permanent settlement areas.

Kleinzell can be reached from the north (Gölsental) and from the south (Kalte Kuchl) via the L133. In the east, the L132 leads to Ramsau via the Dürrholzer Kreuz.

=== Municipal structure ===
Kleinzell is divided into the following settlements (in parentheses population size as of January 1, 2021):

- Außerhalbach (87)
- Ebenwald (31)
- Innerhalbach (96)
- Kleinzell (640)

== Population ==
Historical population
Year	Pop.	±%
1869	1,353	—
1880	1,259	−6.9%
1890	1,286	+2.1%
1900	1,270	−1.2%
1910	1,364	+7.4%
1923	1,243	−8.9%
1934	1,288	+3.6%
1939	1,205	−6.4%
1951	1,178	−2.2%
1961	1,049	−11.0%
1971	1,073	+2.3%
1981	1,017	−5.2%
1991	845	−16.9%
2001	834	−1.3%
2011	840	+0.7%
2021	854	+1.7%
2024	869	+1.8%

== Sights ==
The small parish church in Kleinzell was built in the 14th Century. It is stately perched on top of the hill. Fifty-six stairs lead up to the parish built in honor of Mary's Assumption into heaven. The wooden altar was created by Linz sculptor Ludwig Linzinger in 1897 as part of the neo-Gothic renovations. The relief shows the Annunciation of the Blessed Virgin Mary and the announcement made by the Angel Gabriel saying that she would conceive and become the mother of Jesus. Cross ribbed ceiling. Artistically carved, wooden Stations of the Cross hang on the walls. The oldest bell in the district tolls every Saturday at noon as a reminder that once sirens blared warning the villagers of impending bomb attacks. The refurbished chamber organ was built by Ignaz Gatto "The Elder" in AD 1750.

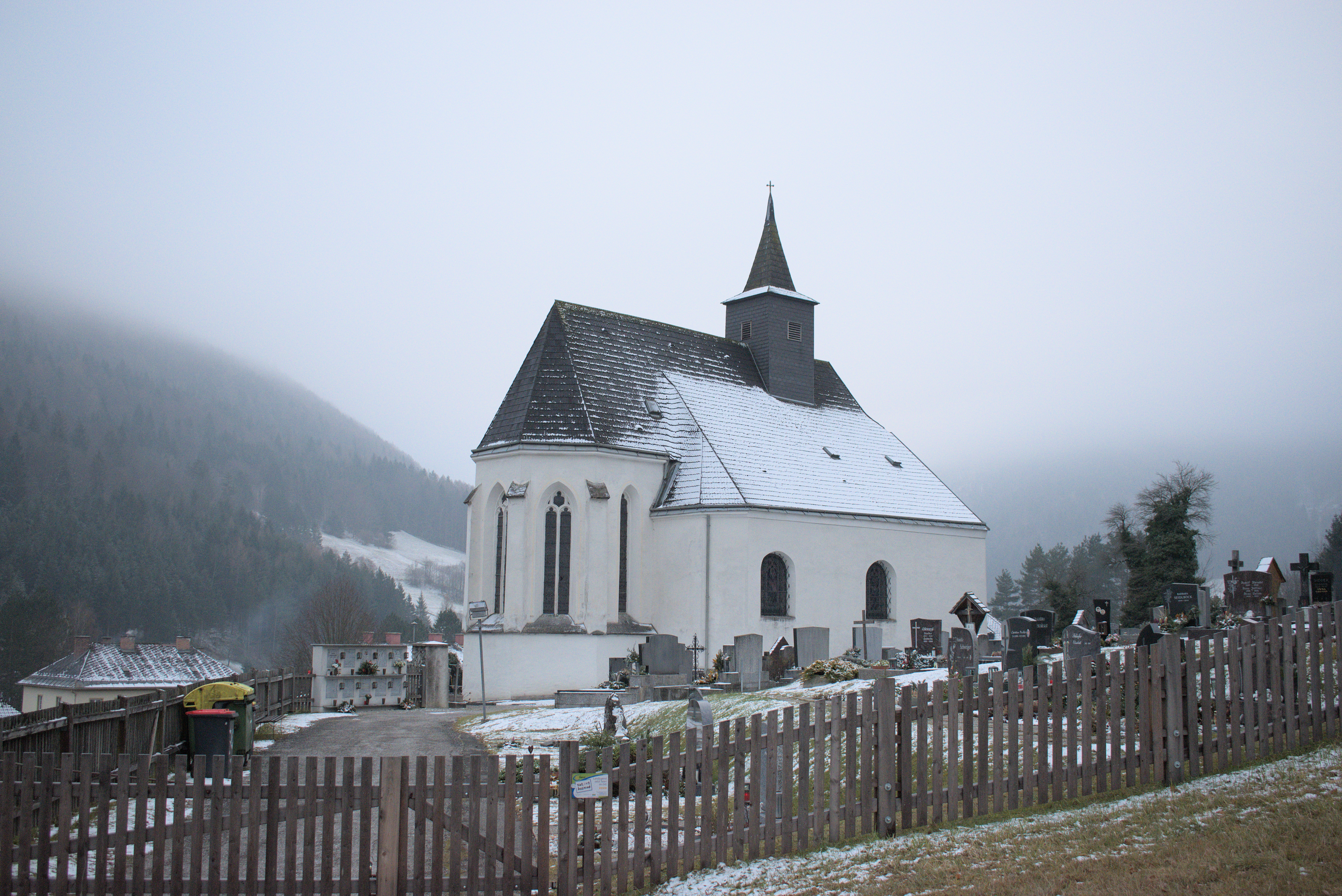
Parish church

== Politics ==
The Kleinzell municipal council has 15 seats, which are divided as follows (2020 Lower Austria local elections):

- 11 seats: Österreichische Volkspartei Kleinzell
- 2 seats: Sozialdemokratische Partei Österreichs und Parteifreie
- 2 seats: FPÖ und Unabhängige

== Public facilities ==
Kleinzell has a kindergarten and a primary school.

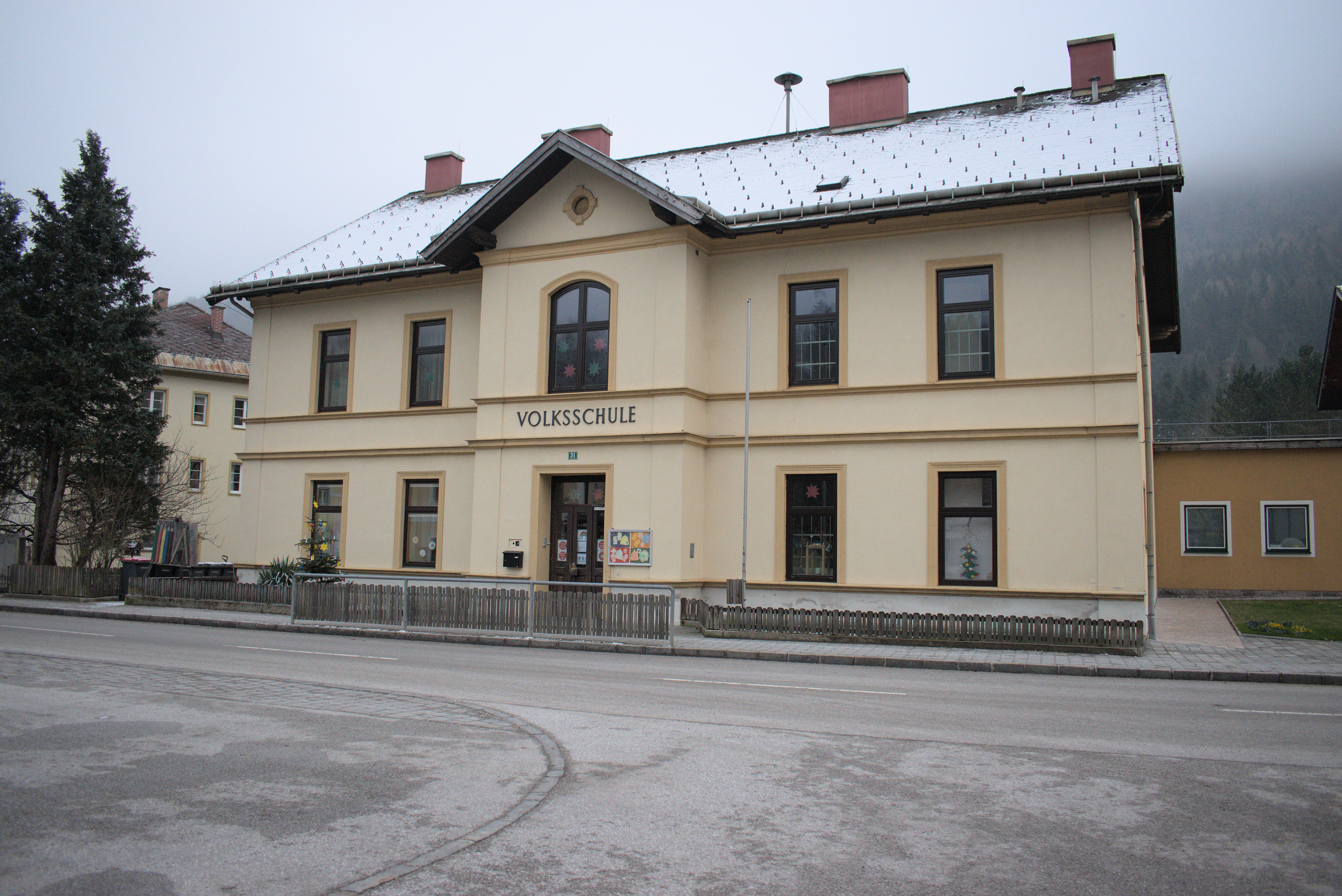
Primary school

== Personalities ==
This is also the hometown of Gertrude Kerschner. Her life story can be found in "Through Innocent Eyes - The Chosen Girls of the Hitler Youth."
