= Peter Kempny =

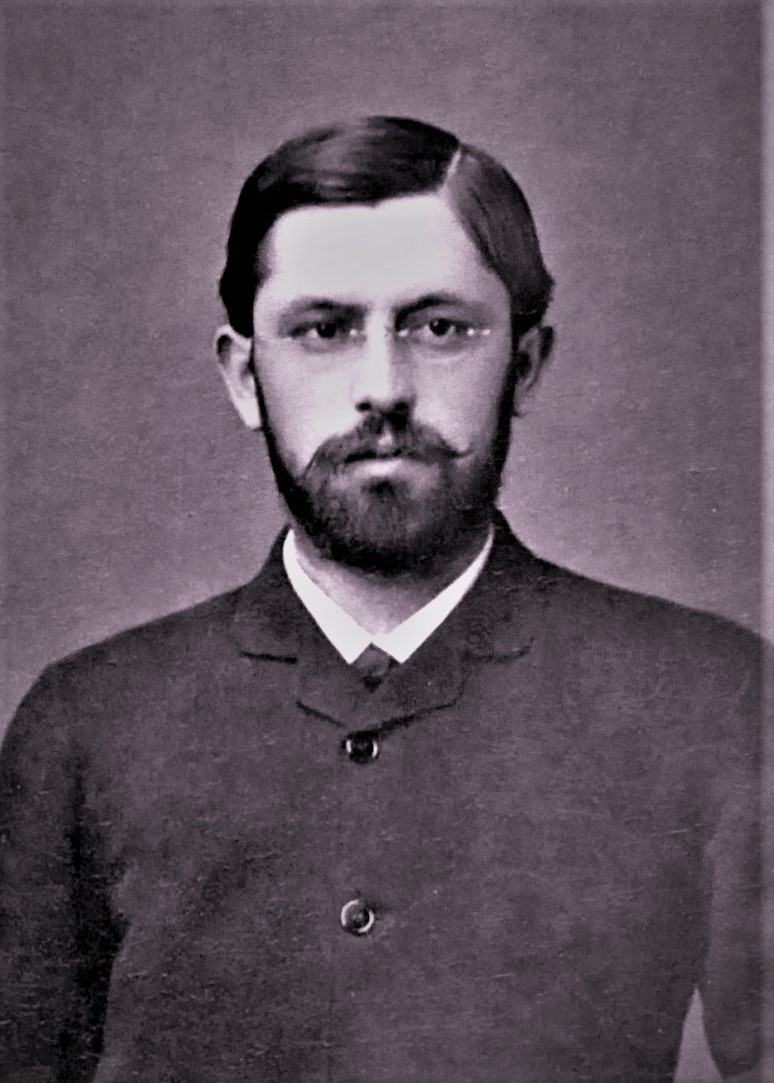
In 1886

Peter Kempny (5 February 1862 – 20 May 1906) was an Austrian physician, entomologist, and musician. He took a special interest in the neuroptera of Austro-Hungary. He also worked on the stoneflies of Europe.

== Life and work ==
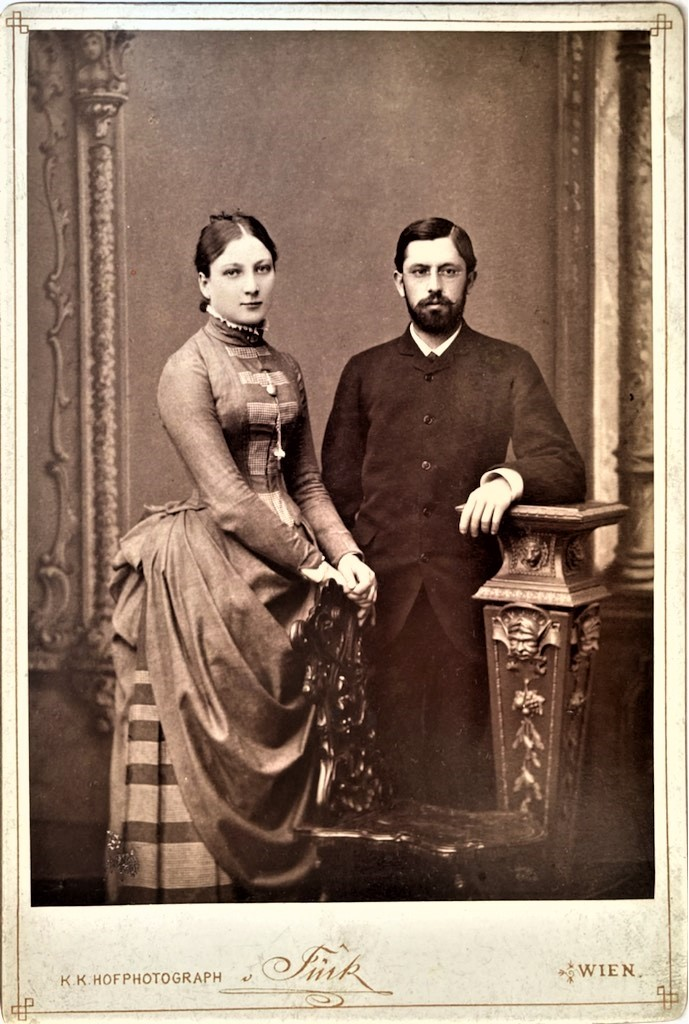
Valentine and Peter Kempny, 1886

Kempny was born in Vienna to Peter Paul and Theresia née Schuster. The father played Violoncello and his mother was a violinist and from an early age he learned to play the piano. He went to Mariahilf gymnasium and graduated in 1880. Musically talented, he composed at the age of 10. He also had an interest in the natural sciences he chose to study medicine and received a medical degree from the University of Vienna in 1886. He practiced at Wieden hospital and then went to Gutenstein as a physician. He married Valentine Berger and they would have four children. He also worked at the spa established by Julius Deininger in Gutenstein, playing music in the evenings. He collected insects around the country in his spare time. He also played tennis and took a keen interest in music, both playing and composing. He collected lepidoptera initially and when he found that there was nothing new to be discovered, he shifted to the neuroptera. He began to look at specific groups such as the antlions. His collections were later moved to the Royal Natural History Museum. He died from a heart condition after four months of illness. His musical compositions were rediscovered after his death. Between 2023 and 2025, his musical estate was digitized and made publicly accessible as part of a project supported by the Austrian Federal Ministry for Arts, Culture, the Civil Service and Sport. His daughter Hedwig Kempny (1895–1986) became a writer and friend of Arthur Schnitzler.
