= Reisalpe =

Mountain in Lower Austria

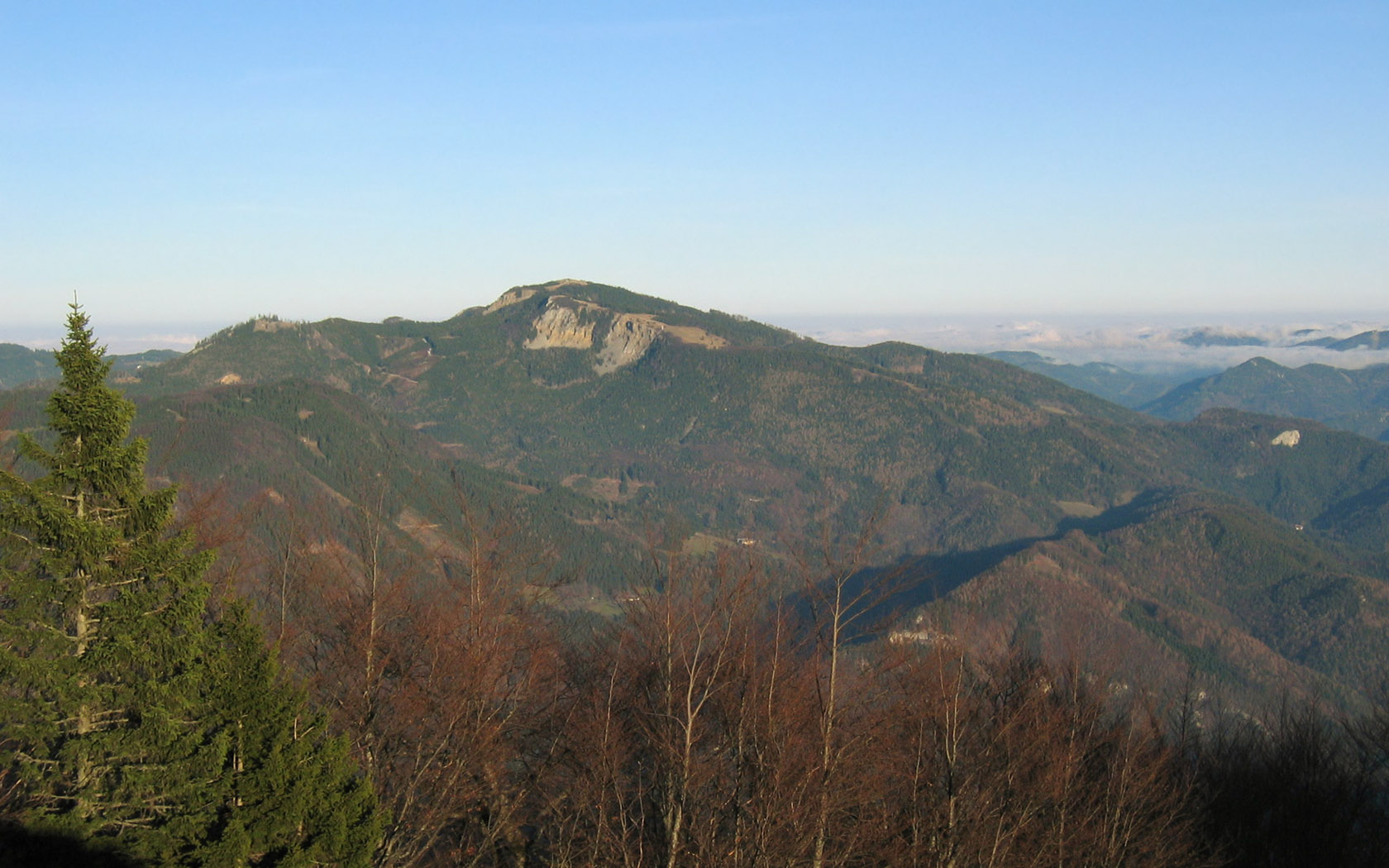
- The Reisalpe from the southwest (from the eastern slopes of the Türnitzer Höger)

Highest point
- Elevation: 1,399 m (AA) (4,590 ft)
- Prominence: 638
- Coordinates: 47°57′24″N 15°39′49″E

Geography
- Location within Austria
- Location: Niederösterreich, Austria
- Parent range: Gutenstein Alps

Climbing
- Easiest route: Walking trail

The Reisalpe (1,399 m) is the highest mountain in the Gutenstein Alps and lies between Lilienfeld, Hohenberg and Kleinzell in Lower Austria. It is a popular destination, both for hikers in summer and also for ski mountaineering and snowshoe walks in winter, and is classed as relatively safe from avalanches.

Near the summit stands a Madonna, recently joined by a summit cross, as well as the Reisalpe refuge hut (Schutzhaus) opened on 9 October 1898. A small Austrian Armed Forces hut is also located in the vicinity of the summit.

== Schutzhaus ==
In October 1898, the Reisalpe Schutzhaus was opened. It had taken three years to build, and seven hundred people attended the elaborate opening ceremony.

The Reisalpe poem was read out loud:

"Great calm and deep peace is only with you,
when you are on this land.
What is the magic of the forest? Of the trees?
Of the birds and the bees?
Of God's great commands?
The trunk of the great Black Pine still lives,
when it bleeds.
You are in the Alps so high,
are you not dreaming of the Reis'alpine?
Seek friendship with the ones you meet.
Learn to speak so they understand.
Anyone who brings the good towards you,
will be your friend on this mountain grassland."

== Literature ==
Sandor, Cynthia A. (2012). Through Innocent Eyes,ISBN 978-0-578-17724-3.
