= Wöllersdorf-Steinabrückl =

- Municipality
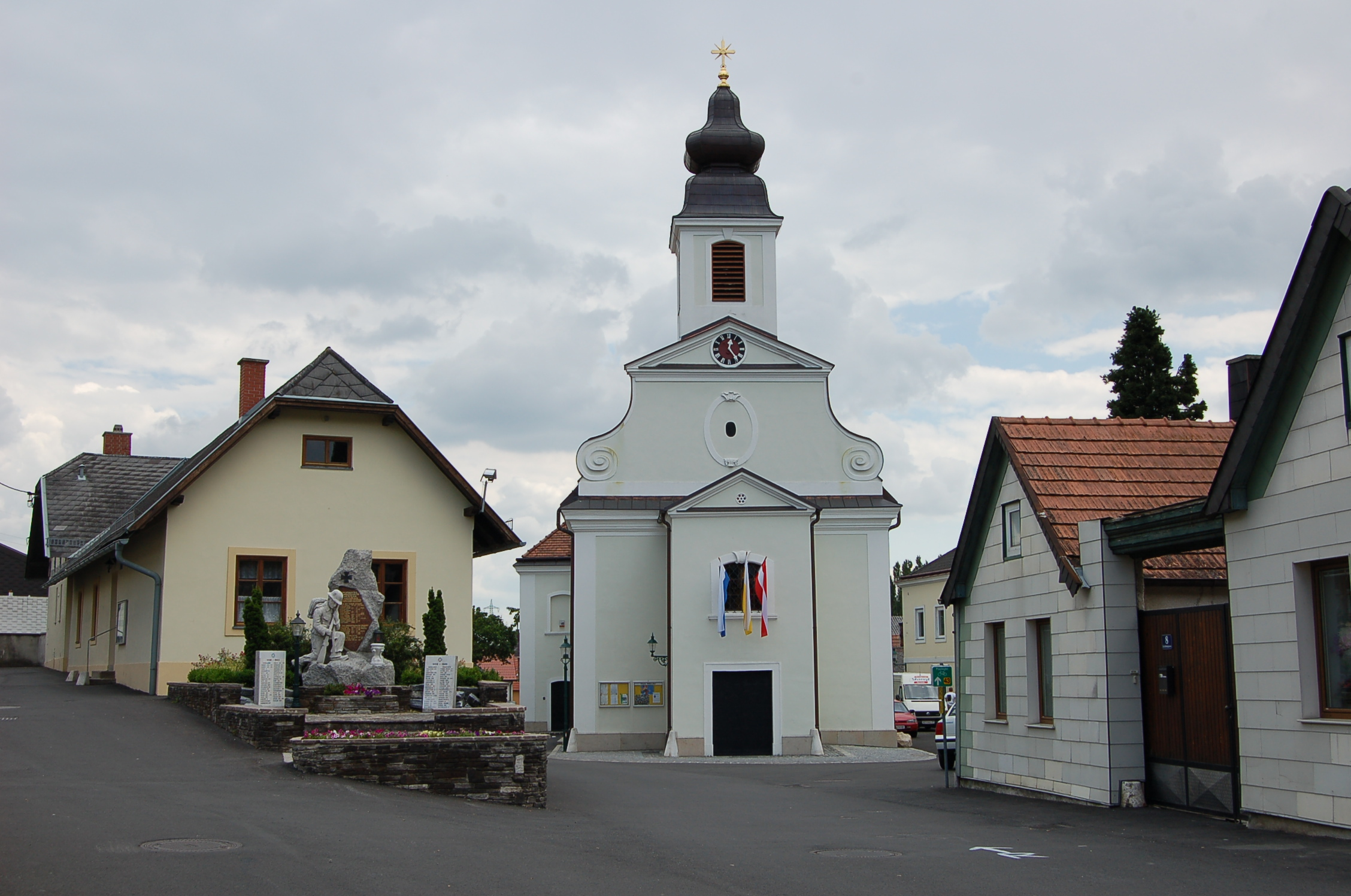
- Wöllersdorf parish church

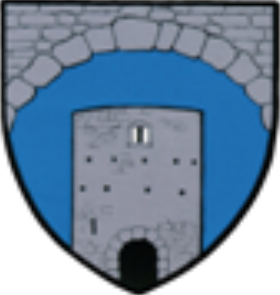
- Coat of arms

- Location within Austria
- Coordinates: 47°52′00″N 16°10′00″E
- Country: Austria
- State: Lower Austria
- District: Wiener Neustadt-Land

Government
  - Mayor: Gustav Glöckler (ÖVP)

Area
  - Total: 14.53 km^{2} (5.61 sq mi)
- Elevation: 315 m (1,033 ft)

Population (2018-01-01)
  - Total: 4,473
  - Density: 307.8/km^{2} (797.3/sq mi)
- Time zone: UTC+1 (CET)
  - Summer (DST): UTC+2 (CEST)
- Postal code: 2752 (Wöllersdorf); 2751 (Steinabrückl)
- Area code: 02633 (Wöllersdorf); 02622 (Steinabrückl)
- Vehicle registration: WB
- Website: www.woellersdorf-steinabrueckl.at

Wöllersdorf-Steinabrückl is a municipality in the district of Wiener Neustadt-Land in the Austrian state of Lower Austria.

== Geography ==
The municipality is located in the Industrieviertel (i. e.: Industrial Quarter) section of Lower Austria at the western edge of the Vienna Basin some 30 kilometres south of Vienna. The river Piesting is flowing through the area of the municipality.

43.2 percent of its area are forested.

=== Municipality structure ===
The municipality is composed of two localities and cadastral communities, these being the villages of Steinabrückl and Wöllersdorf.

== History ==
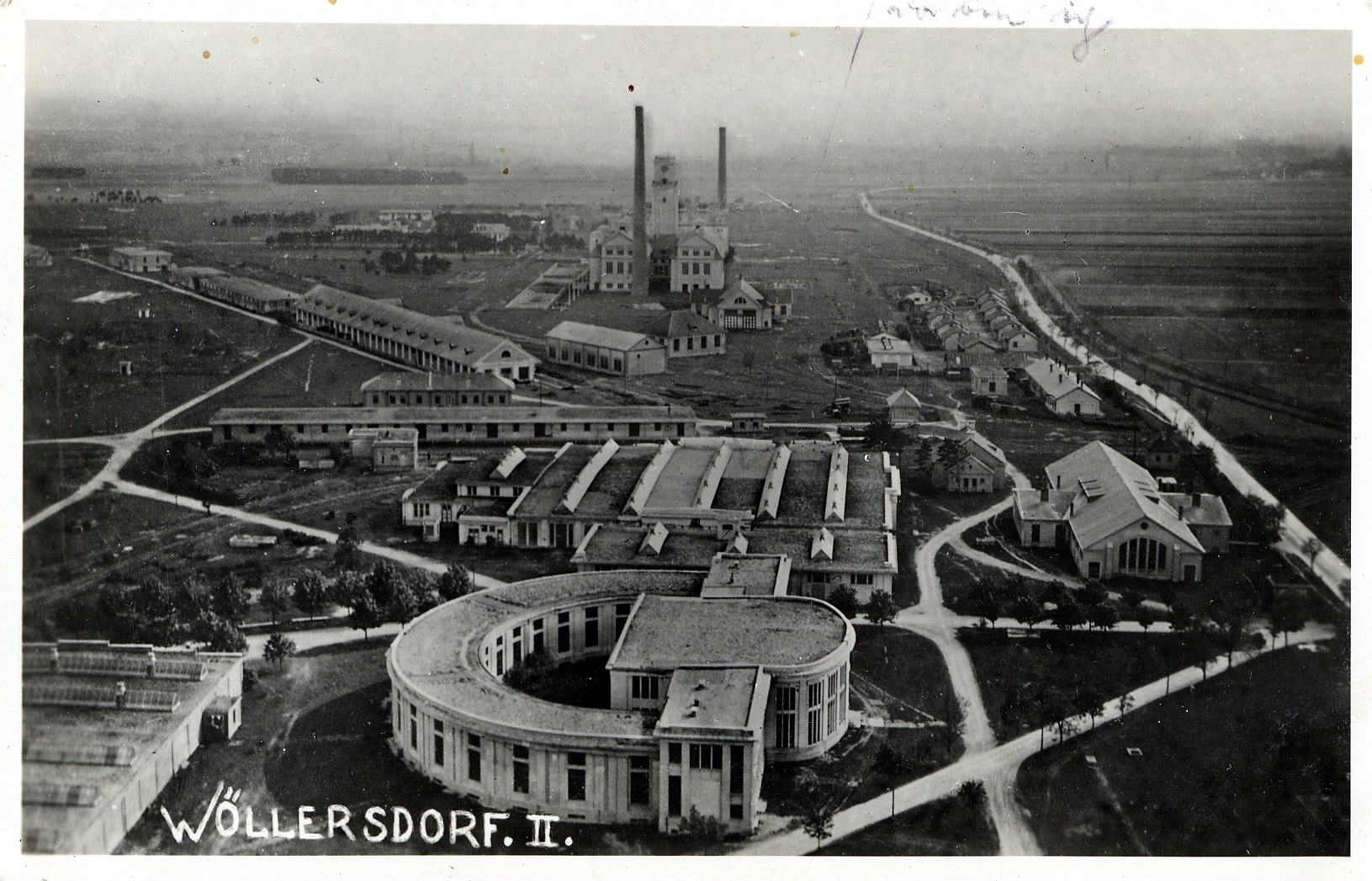
Old ordnance factory

The old ordnance factory in the municipality was used as a concentration camp from 1933 until 1938.

== Population ==
Historical population
Year	Pop.	±%
1869	2,235	—
1880	2,372	+6.1%
1890	2,495	+5.2%
1900	2,629	+5.4%
1910	3,178	+20.9%
1923	3,514	+10.6%
1934	3,079	−12.4%
1939	2,830	−8.1%
1951	2,561	−9.5%
1961	2,386	−6.8%
1971	2,451	+2.7%
1981	2,690	+9.8%
1991	3,190	+18.6%
2001	3,797	+19.0%
2011	4,171	+9.8%
