= Rohr Saddle =

Rohr Saddle Rohrer Sattel
- Location within Alps
- Elevation: 864 metres (2,835 ft)
- Traversed by: Federal Highway B 21

Third Approach
- Location: Austria
- Range: Alps
- Coordinates: 47°52′N 15°48′E

The Rohr Saddle (German: Rohrer Sattel, el. 864 m.) is a high mountain pass in the Austrian Alps, located in the Bundesland of Lower Austria.

It connects Rohr im Gebirge and Gutenstein and has a maximum grade of 84 percent. The pass road is the Gutensteinerstraße (B 21).

== See also ==
- List of mountain passes
