= Fischa =

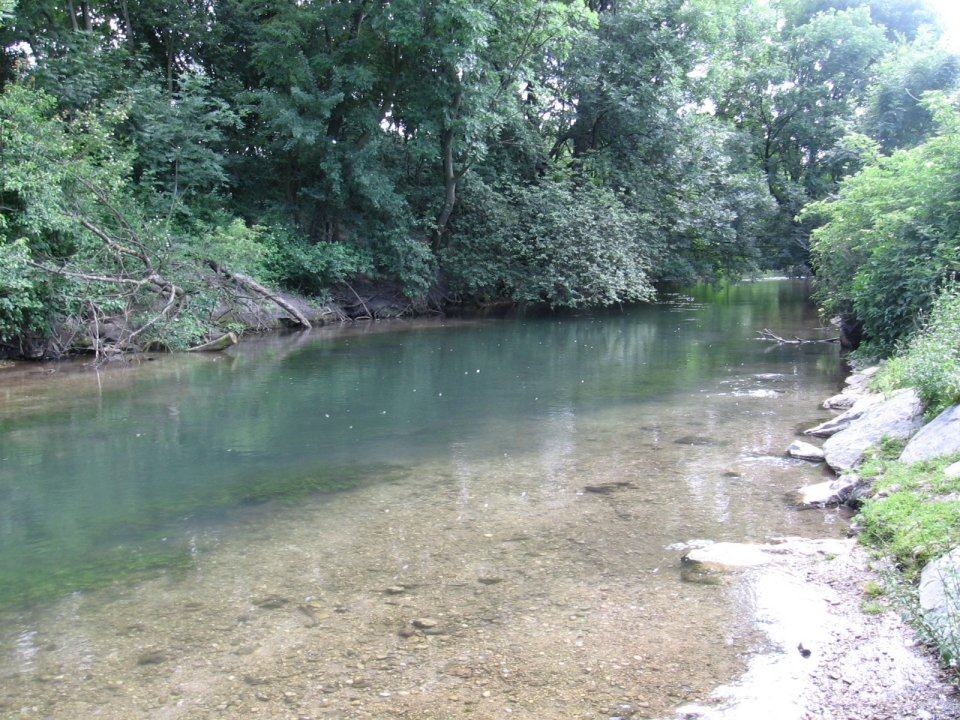
- The Fischa at Mitterndorf

Location
- Country: Austria
- State: Lower Austria

Physical characteristics
- Mouth
  - location: Danube near Fischamend
  - coordinates: 48.1196°N 16.6771°E
- Length: 49.5 km (30.8 mi)
- Basin size: 563 km^{2} (217 sq mi)

Basin features
- Progression: Danube→ Black Sea
- Tributaries
  - left: Piesting

The Fischa (German pronunciation: [ˈfɪʃa]) is a river of Lower Austria. It is a right tributary of the Danube near the town Fischamend. Its drainage basin is 563 km^{2} (217 sq mi).
