= Markt Piesting =

- Municipality
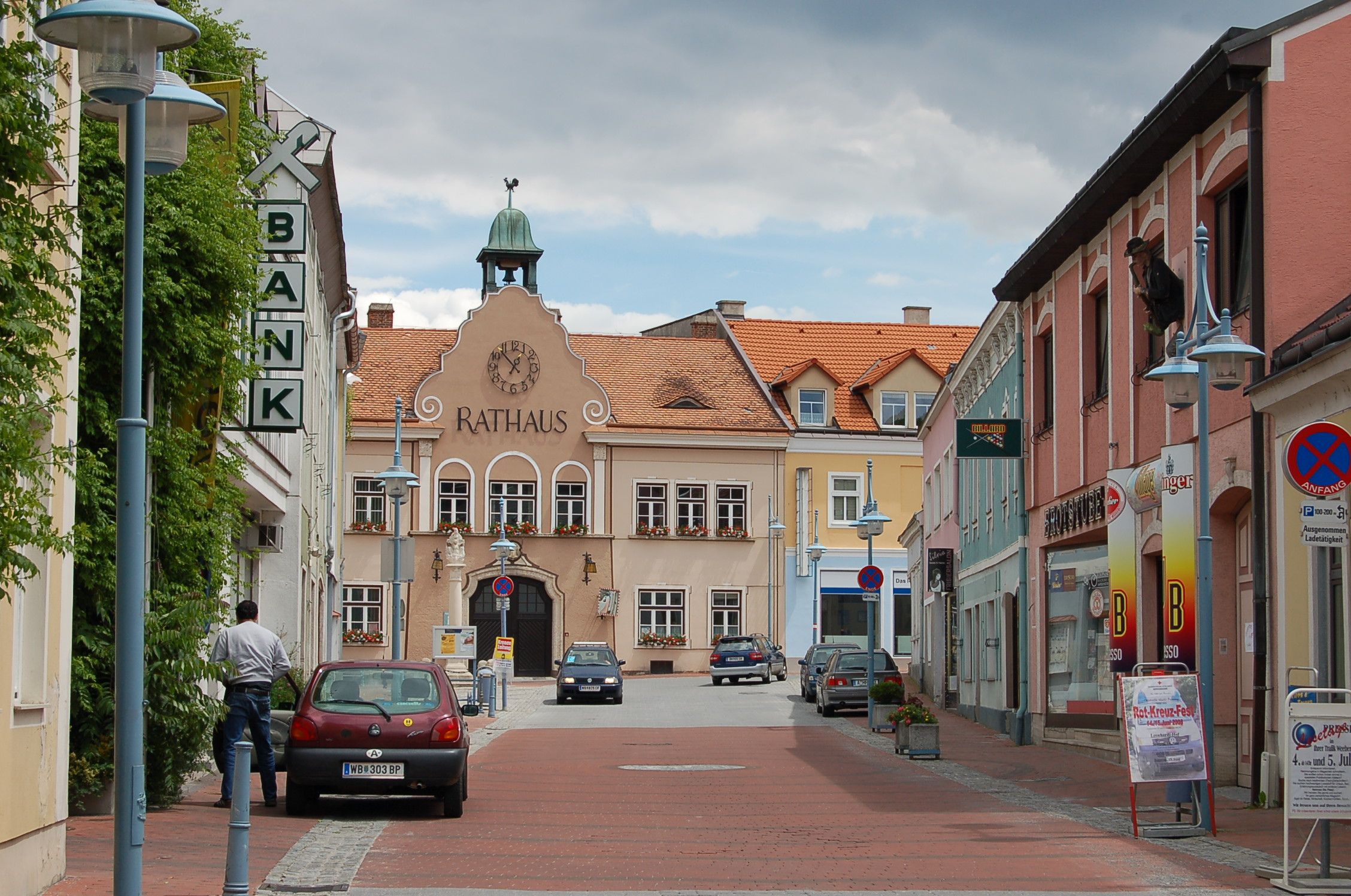
- Piesting market square and town hall

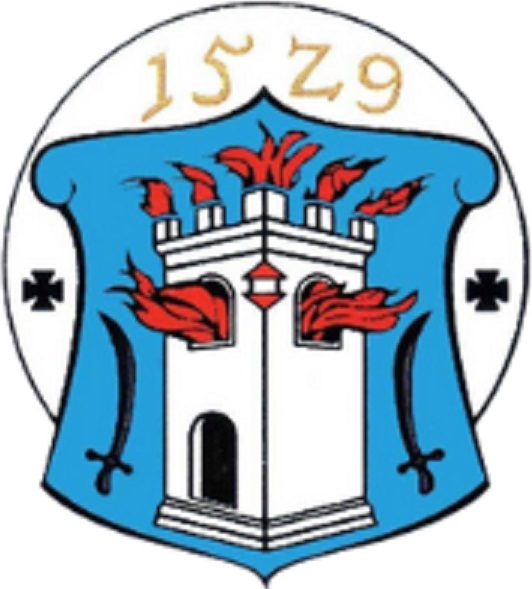
- Coat of arms

- Location within Austria
- Coordinates: 47°52′22″N 16°07′44″E
- Country: Austria
- State: Lower Austria
- District: Wiener Neustadt-Land

Government
  - Mayor: Gerhard Baumgartner (ÖVP)

Area
  - Total: 18.19 km^{2} (7.02 sq mi)
- Elevation: 349 m (1,145 ft)

Population (2018-01-01)
  - Total: 3,007
  - Density: 165.3/km^{2} (428.2/sq mi)
- Time zone: UTC+1 (CET)
  - Summer (DST): UTC+2 (CEST)
- Postal code: 2753
- Area code: 02633
- Vehicle registration: WB
- Website: www.piesting.at

Markt Piesting is a municipality in the district of Wiener Neustadt-Land in the Austrian state of Lower Austria.

== Population ==
Historical population

| Year | Pop. | ±% |
|---|---|---|
| 1869 | 1,846 | — |
| 1880 | 1,882 | +2.0% |
| 1890 | 1,979 | +5.2% |
| 1900 | 2,141 | +8.2% |
| 1910 | 2,105 | −1.7% |
| 1923 | 2,358 | +12.0% |
| 1934 | 2,107 | −10.6% |
| 1939 | 2,082 | −1.2% |

| Year | Pop. | ±% |
|---|---|---|
| 1951 | 2,038 | −2.1% |
| 1961 | 1,966 | −3.5% |
| 1971 | 1,890 | −3.9% |
| 1981 | 2,182 | +15.4% |
| 1991 | 2,374 | +8.8% |
| 2001 | 2,698 | +13.6% |
| 2011 | 2,914 | +8.0% |

== See also ==
- Burgruine Starhemberg
