= Muggendorf =

- Municipality
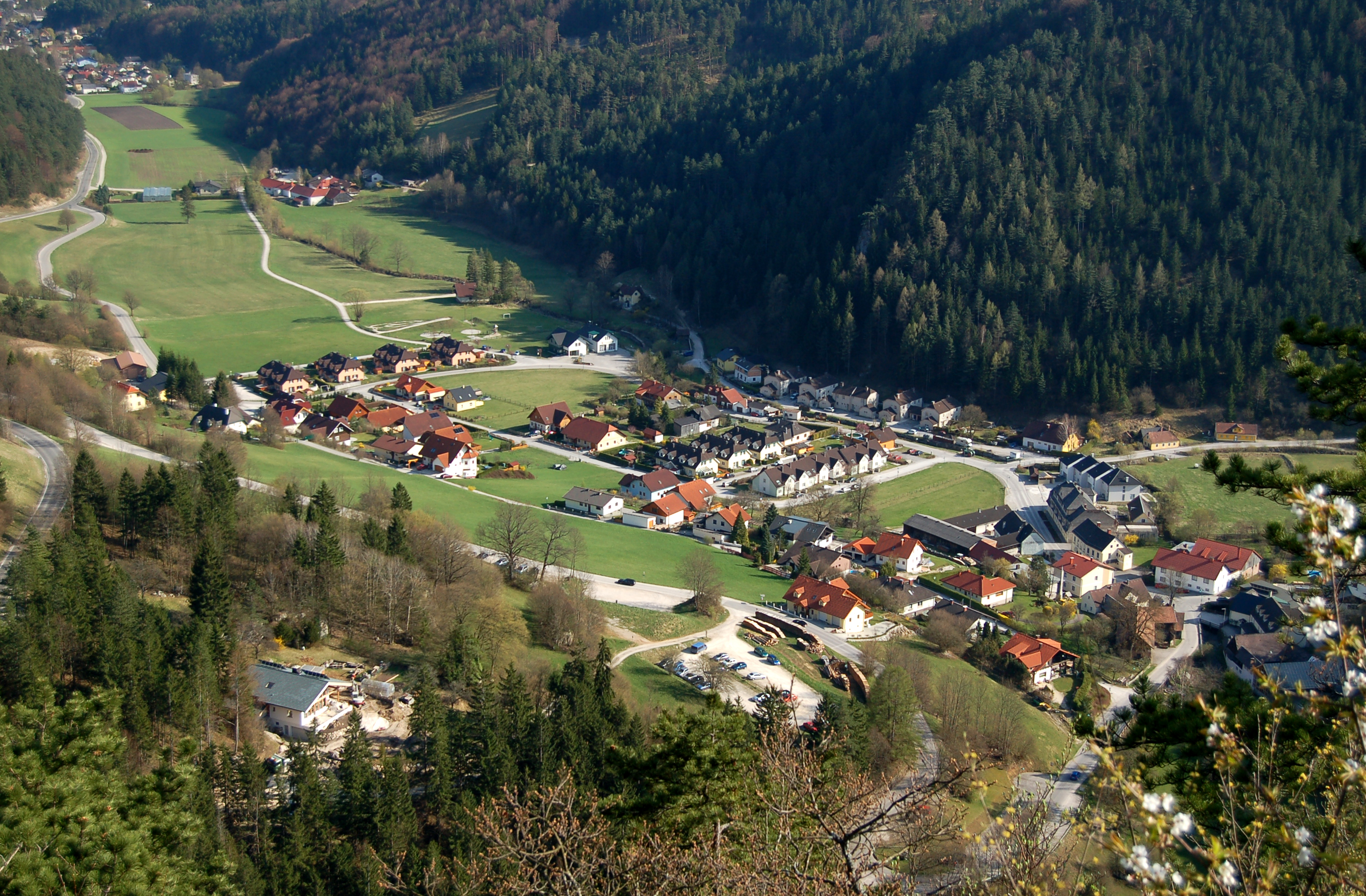
- Muggendorf, view from Hausstein

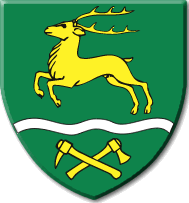
- Coat of arms

- Location within Austria
- Coordinates: 47°54′00″N 15°56′00″E
- Country: Austria
- State: Lower Austria
- District: Wiener Neustadt-Land

Government
  - Mayor: Gottfried Brandstetter (ÖVP)

Area
  - Total: 51.08 km^{2} (19.72 sq mi)
- Elevation: 450 m (1,480 ft)

Population (2018-01-01)
  - Total: 528
  - Density: 10.3/km^{2} (26.8/sq mi)
- Time zone: UTC+1 (CET)
  - Summer (DST): UTC+2 (CEST)
- Postal code: 2763
- Area code: 02632
- Vehicle registration: WB
- Website: www.muggendorf.at

Muggendorf (Austrian German pronunciation: [ˈmʊɡn̩dɔrf]) is a municipality in the district of Wiener Neustadt-Land in the Austrian state of Lower Austria.

== Population ==
Historical population
Year	Pop.	±%
1869	666	—
1880	537	−19.4%
1890	562	+4.7%
1900	584	+3.9%
1910	583	−0.2%
1923	598	+2.6%
1934	567	−5.2%
1939	530	−6.5%
1951	511	−3.6%
1961	491	−3.9%
1971	421	−14.3%
1981	416	−1.2%
1991	433	+4.1%
2001	520	+20.1%
2011	529	+1.7%
