= Furth an der Triesting =

- Municipality
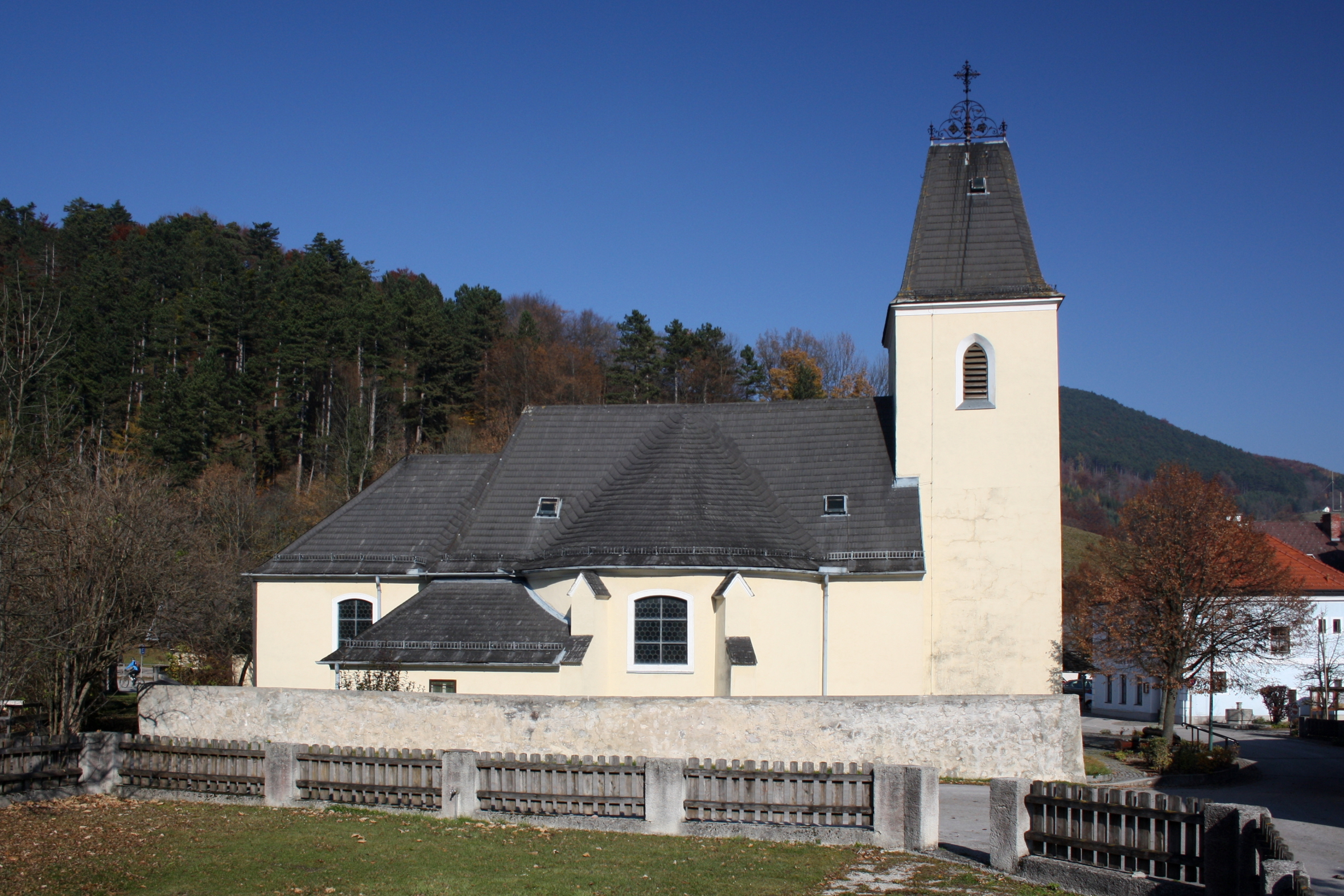
- Church of Saint Mary Magdalene

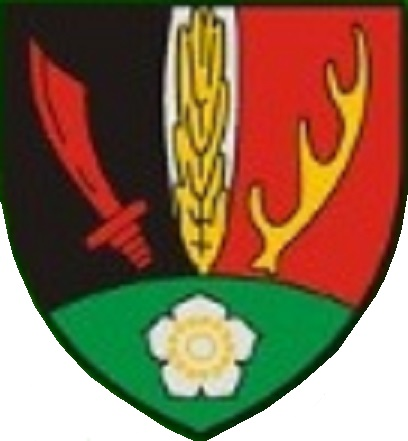
- Coat of arms

- Location within Austria
- Coordinates: 47°58′N 15°58′E
- Country: Austria
- State: Lower Austria
- District: Baden

Government
  - Mayor: Alois Riegler (ÖVP)

Area
  - Total: 64.24 km^{2} (24.80 sq mi)
- Elevation: 422 m (1,385 ft)

Population (2018-01-01)
  - Total: 862
  - Density: 13.4/km^{2} (34.8/sq mi)
- Time zone: UTC+1 (CET)
  - Summer (DST): UTC+2 (CEST)
- Postal code: 2564
- Area code: 02674
- Website: www.furth-triesting.at

Furth an der Triesting is a town in the district of Baden in Lower Austria in Austria.

Furth an der Triesting was governed by the citizen list We for Furth (WFF) until 2020. The WFF will join the ÖVP in 2019 and will receive all mandates in the municipal council in the 2020 elections.

The SPÖ had a mandate until 2020, since 2020 the party has been insignificant in the city.

== Populations ==
Historical population
| Year | Pop. | ±% |
|---|---|---|
| 1939 | 967 | — |
| 1951 | 885 | −8.5% |
| 1961 | 820 | −7.3% |
| 1971 | 809 | −1.3% |
| 1981 | 753 | −6.9% |
| 1991 | 745 | −1.1% |
| 2001 | 795 | +6.7% |
| 2001 | 795 | +0.0% |
| 2011 | 823 | +3.5% |
