= Pernitz =

- Municipality
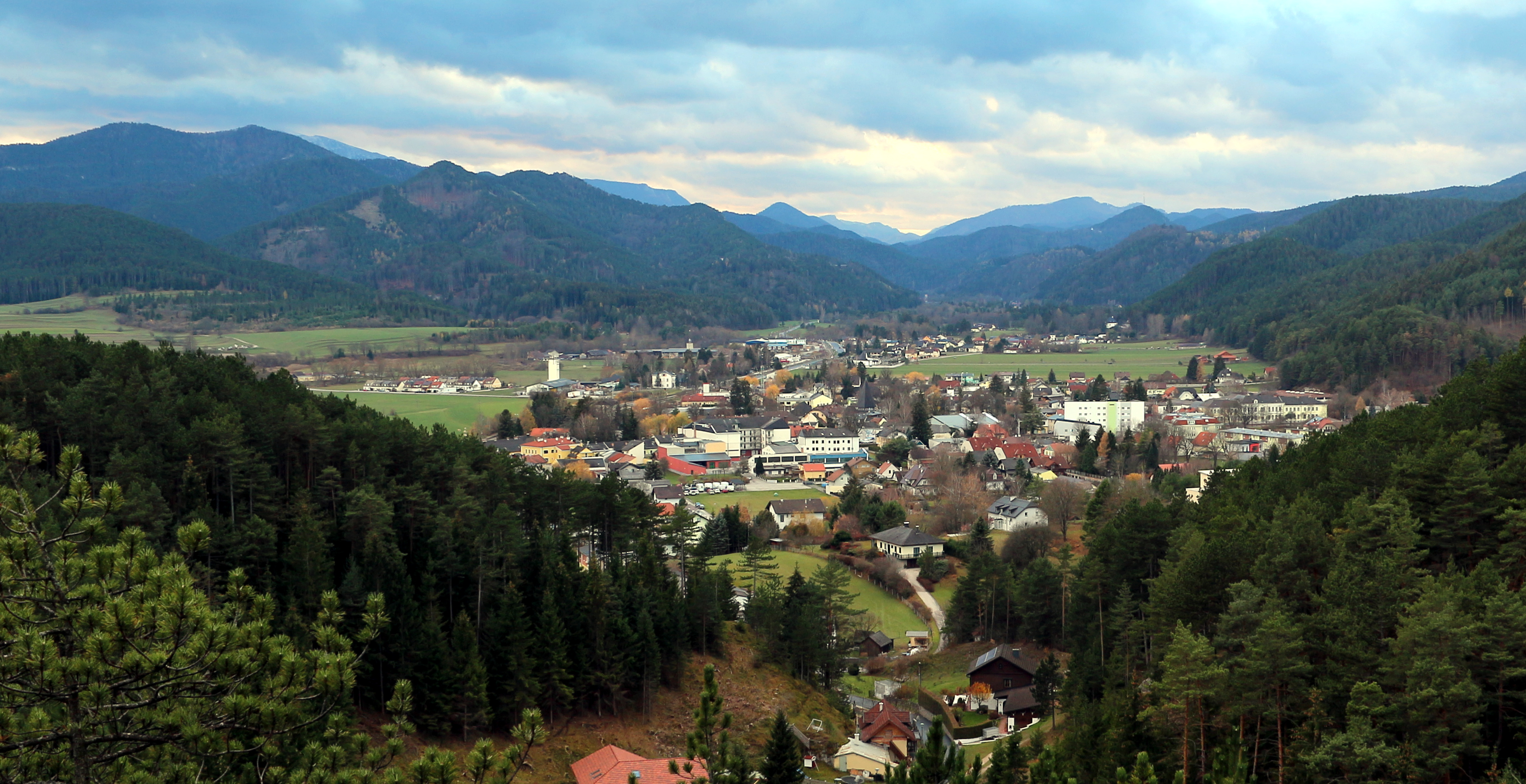

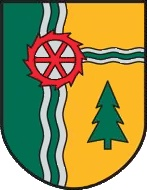
- Coat of arms

- Location within Austria
- Coordinates: 47°54′00″N 15°58′00″E
- Country: Austria
- State: Lower Austria
- District: Wiener Neustadt-Land

Government
  - Mayor: Hubert Postiasi (ÖVP)

Area
  - Total: 16.59 km^{2} (6.41 sq mi)
- Elevation: 430 m (1,410 ft)

Population (2023-01-01)
  - Total: 2,488
  - Density: 150.0/km^{2} (388.4/sq mi)
- Time zone: UTC+1 (CET)
  - Summer (DST): UTC+2 (CEST)
- Postal code: 2763
- Area code: 02632
- Vehicle registration: WB
- Website: www.pernitz.co.at

Pernitz is a town in the district of Wiener Neustadt-Land in the Austrian state of Lower Austria.

== History ==
The origin of the name Pernitz is the Slavic word perenica, which refers to a stream on which charcoal is used. The Slavic settlement was preceded by a Celtic settlement. The name was first mentioned in 1165 in the Falkensteiner Codex. Since the 17th century Pernitz experienced growth, interrupted by the plague in 1679, and the Second Turkish Siege in 1683.

In 1828, a road was built to the Triesting valley. It was connected by railway to Leobersdorf and Gutenstein in 1877. Pernitz received water in 1904 and electricity in 1908. It became a market town in 1961.

== Population ==
Historical population
Year	Pop.	±%
1869	778	—
1880	902	+15.9%
1890	922	+2.2%
1900	1,089	+18.1%
1910	1,322	+21.4%
1923	1,700	+28.6%
1934	1,932	+13.6%
1939	2,172	+12.4%
1951	2,458	+13.2%
1961	2,584	+5.1%
1971	2,938	+13.7%
1981	2,627	−10.6%
1991	2,513	−4.3%
2001	2,610	+3.9%
2011	2,526	−3.2%
