= Gutenstein, Austria =

Gutenstein
- Municipality
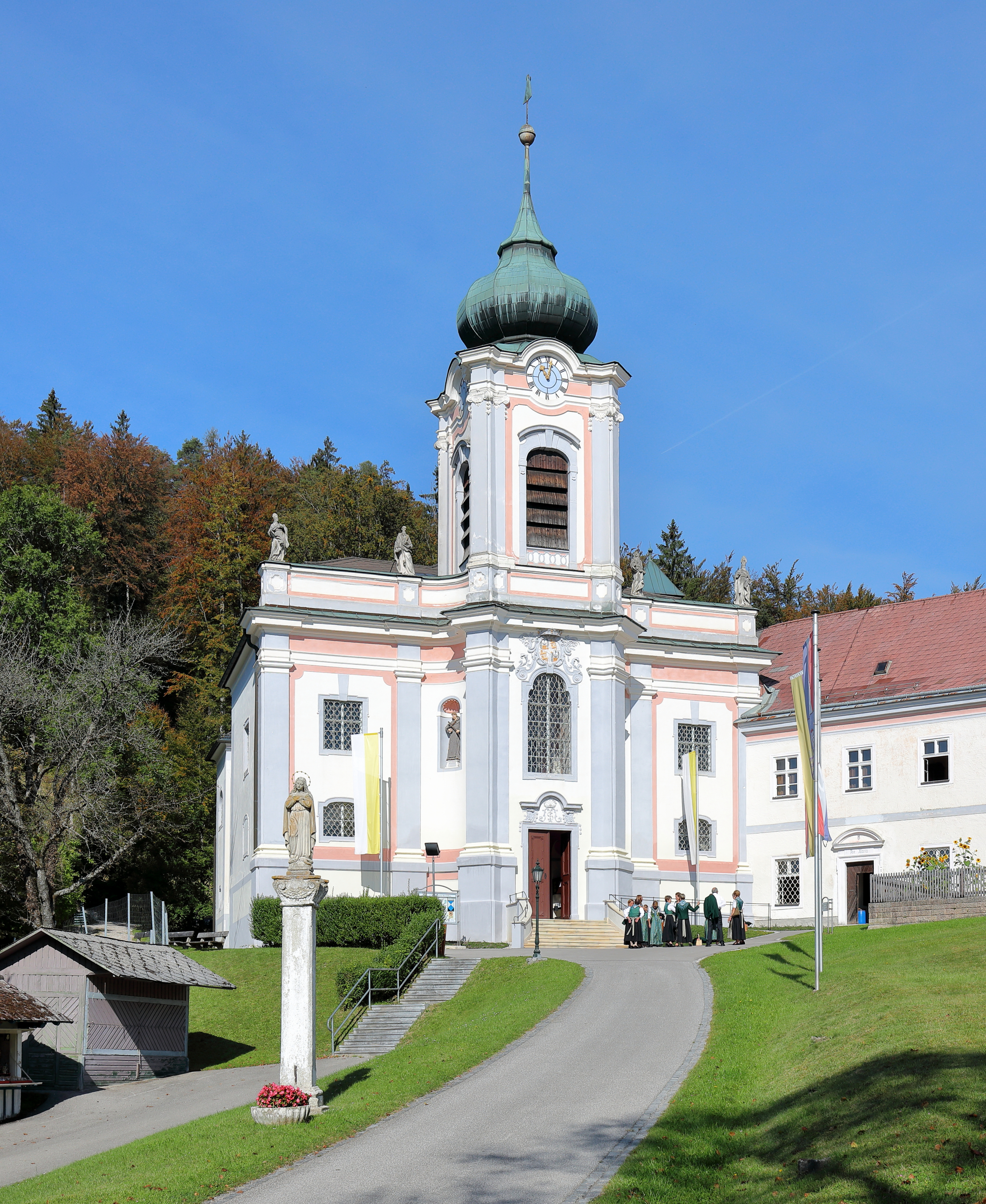

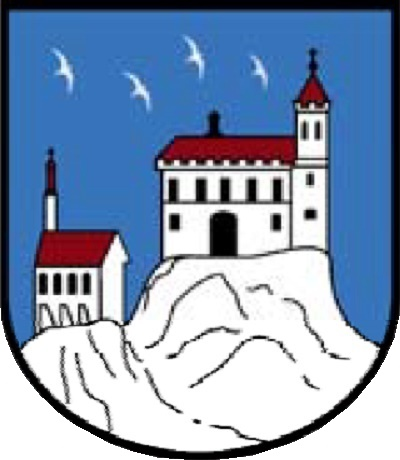
- Coat of arms

- Location within Austria
- Coordinates: 47°52′00″N 15°53′00″E
- Country: Austria
- State: Lower Austria
- District: Wiener Neustadt-Land

Government
  - Mayor: Michael Kreuzer (GFG)

Area
  - Total: 104.2 km^{2} (40.2 sq mi)
- Elevation: 481 m (1,578 ft)

Population (2018-01-01)
  - Total: 1,268
  - Density: 12.17/km^{2} (31.52/sq mi)
- Time zone: UTC+1 (CET)
  - Summer (DST): UTC+2 (CEST)
- Postal code: 2763, 2770
- Area code: +43 2634
- Vehicle registration: WB
- Website: www.gutenstein.at

Gutenstein is a market town in Wiener Neustadt-Land in the Austrian state of Lower Austria.

== Population ==
Historical population
Year	Pop.	±%
1869	1,752	—
1880	1,818	+3.8%
1890	1,803	−0.8%
1900	1,960	+8.7%
1910	1,936	−1.2%
1923	1,764	−8.9%
1934	1,834	+4.0%
1939	1,763	−3.9%
1951	1,860	+5.5%
1961	1,772	−4.7%
1971	1,714	−3.3%
1981	1,550	−9.6%
1991	1,586	+2.3%
2001	1,402	−11.6%
2011	1,324	−5.6%
2019	1,261	−4.8%

== Notable people ==
- Ferdinand Raimund, bought a villa in Gutenstein in 1834 and is buried at the Bergfriedhof.
- Hedy Kempny, Austrian writer, friend of Arthur Schnitzler, was born in Gutenstein.
- Peter Kempny, physician, entomologist and musician, practiced medicine in Gutenstein and had public baths erected there in 1889.
