= Vienna Basin =

Sedimentary basin in Central Europe

Coordinates: 48°12′20″N 16°22′26″E

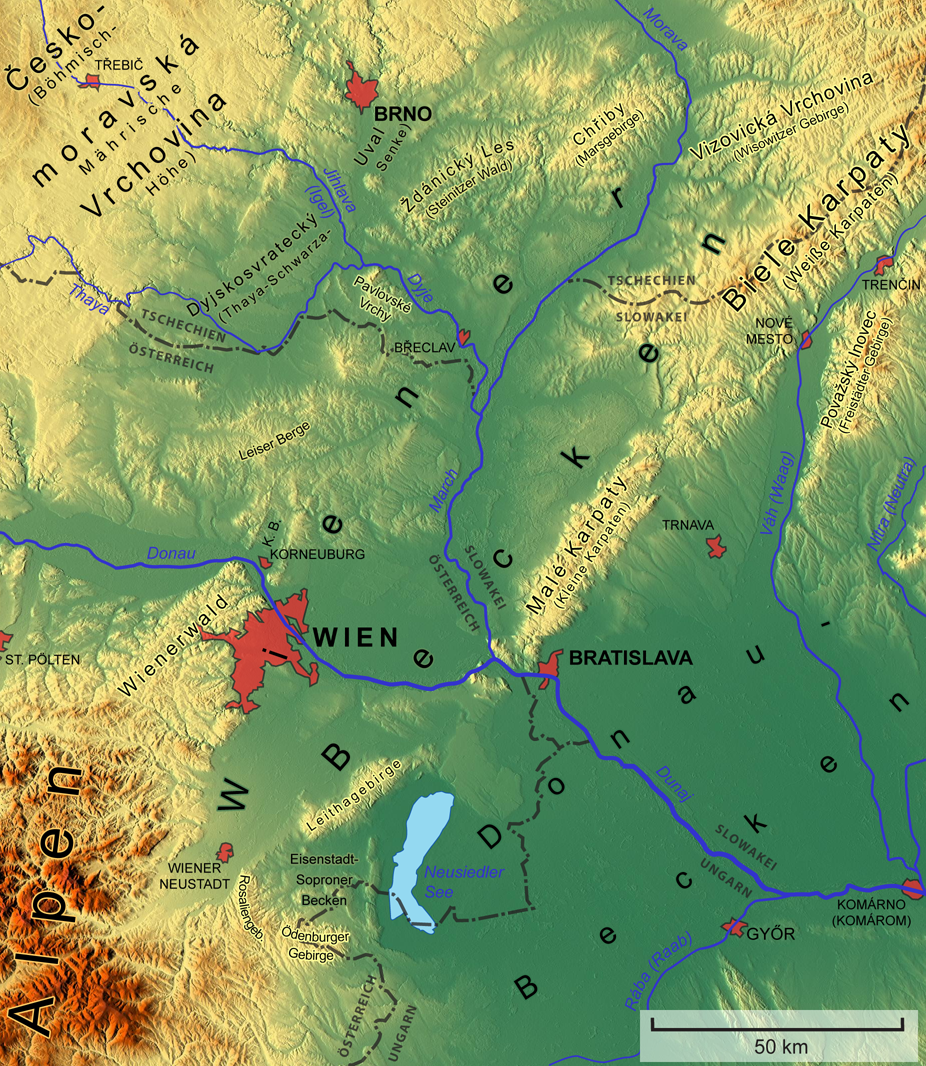
Physical geography of the Vienna Basin

The Vienna Basin (German: Wiener Becken, Czech: Vídeňská pánev, Slovak: Viedenská kotlina, Hungarian: Bécsi-medence) is a geologically young tectonic burial basin and sedimentary basin in the seam area between the Alps, the Carpathians and the Pannonian Plain. Although it topographically separates the Alps from the Western Carpathians, it connects them geologically via corresponding rocks underground.

== Geography ==
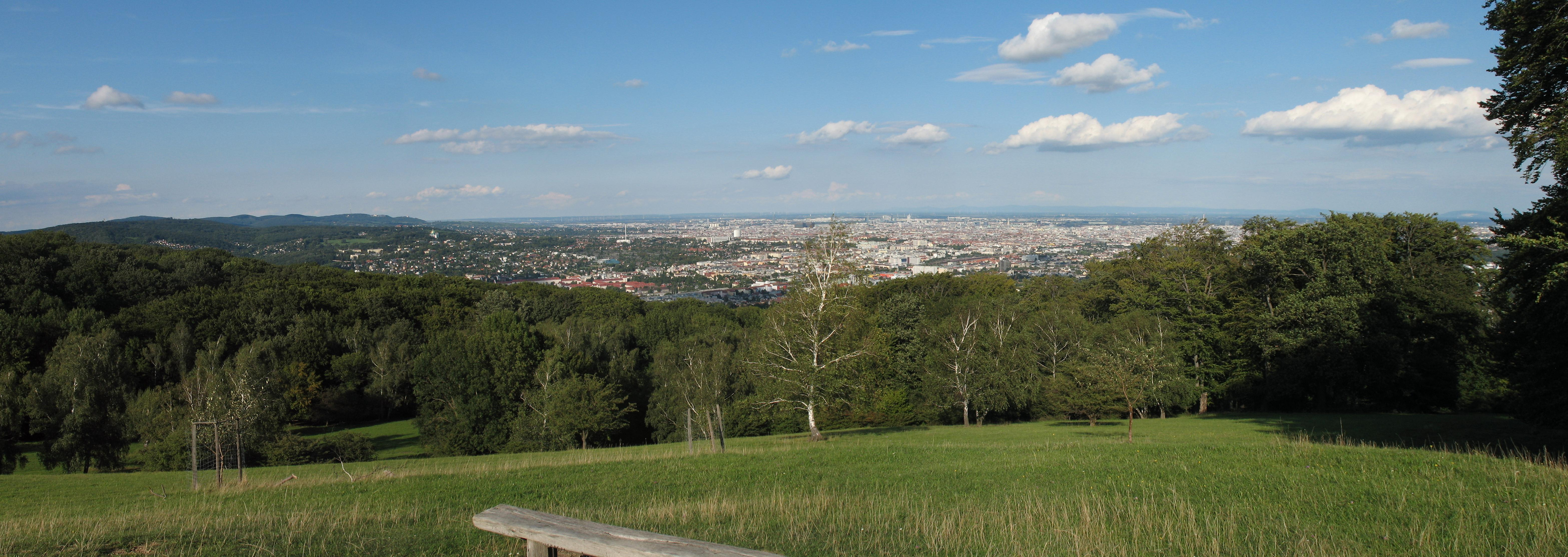
View over Vienna from Lainzer Tiergarten

The fairly level area has the shape of a spindle, over an area of 50 km (31 mi) by 200 km (120 mi). In the north it stretches up to the Marchfeld plateau beyond the Danube River. In the southeast, the Leitha Mountains separate it from the Little Hungarian Plain. In the west, it borders on the Gutenstein Alps and Vienna Woods mountain ranges of the Northern Limestone Alps. The Danube enters the basin at the Vienna Gate water gap near Mt. Leopoldsberg, it leaves at Devín Gate in the Little Carpathians east of Hainburg.

From the late 12th century onwards, the fortresses of Wiener Neustadt and Hainburg were erected at the southeastern and eastern rim as a defensive wall against attacks from the Hungarian lands downstream the Danube River. Nevertheless, the forces of King Matthias Corvinus entered the Vienna Basin during the Austrian-Hungarian War in 1485 to begin the Siege of Vienna. It was again invaded by Ottoman troops, who besieged the city in 1529 and 1683.

== Structuring ==
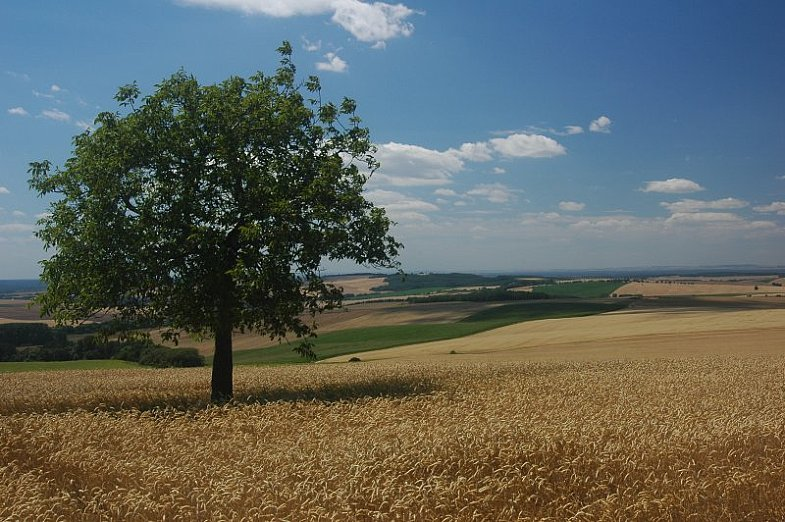
Chvojnice Hills in Slovakia

More than 80% of the basin area belongs to the Austrian states of Lower Austria and Vienna. The northern parts on the Morava (March) and Thaya rivers are part of the Czech Republic and Slovakia. Along the southern and western rim, geothermal and mineral water springs occur in several spa towns such as Baden, Bad Vöslau and Bad Fischau-Brunn.

Parts:

- Vienna Basin proper. The part within the Czech Republic is called Dolnomoravský úval (Lower Morava Valley), whilst that within Slovakia is called Borská nížina (Bor Lowland, part of the Záhorie region)
- Marchfeld (Moravské pole) in Lower Austria
- Chvojnice Hills (Chvojnická pahorkatina) in Slovakia.

The Bor Lowland and Chvojnice Hills are known collectively as Záhorská nížina (Záhorie Lowland).

== Geology ==
The Vienna Basin formations are a series of sedimentary layers that were deposited in the Neogene. It is situated on top of the Alpine fold and thrust belt, located at the junction between the Eastern Alps, the Carpathians, and the Pannonian Basin system. The Vienna Basin has been influenced by the evolution of each of these geologic systems. The basin is characterized by four distinct tectonic phases; (1) Early Miocene piggyback basin, (2) Middle–Late Miocene pull-apart basin, (3) Late Miocene–Pliocene compression and basin inversion, and (4) Quaternary basin formation. The basin has been studied intensively starting with classical paleontological–stratigraphical papers and then continuing since the beginning of hydrocarbon exploration more than 100 years ago. The Vienna Basin fault system on which the basin lies remains seismically active. Significant earthquakes that propagated across the Vienna Basin include the Neulengbach earthquake of 1590, and the strong earthquake that hit Carnuntum in the mid-4th century.
