= Traisen (river) =

River in Lower Austria

Traisen River
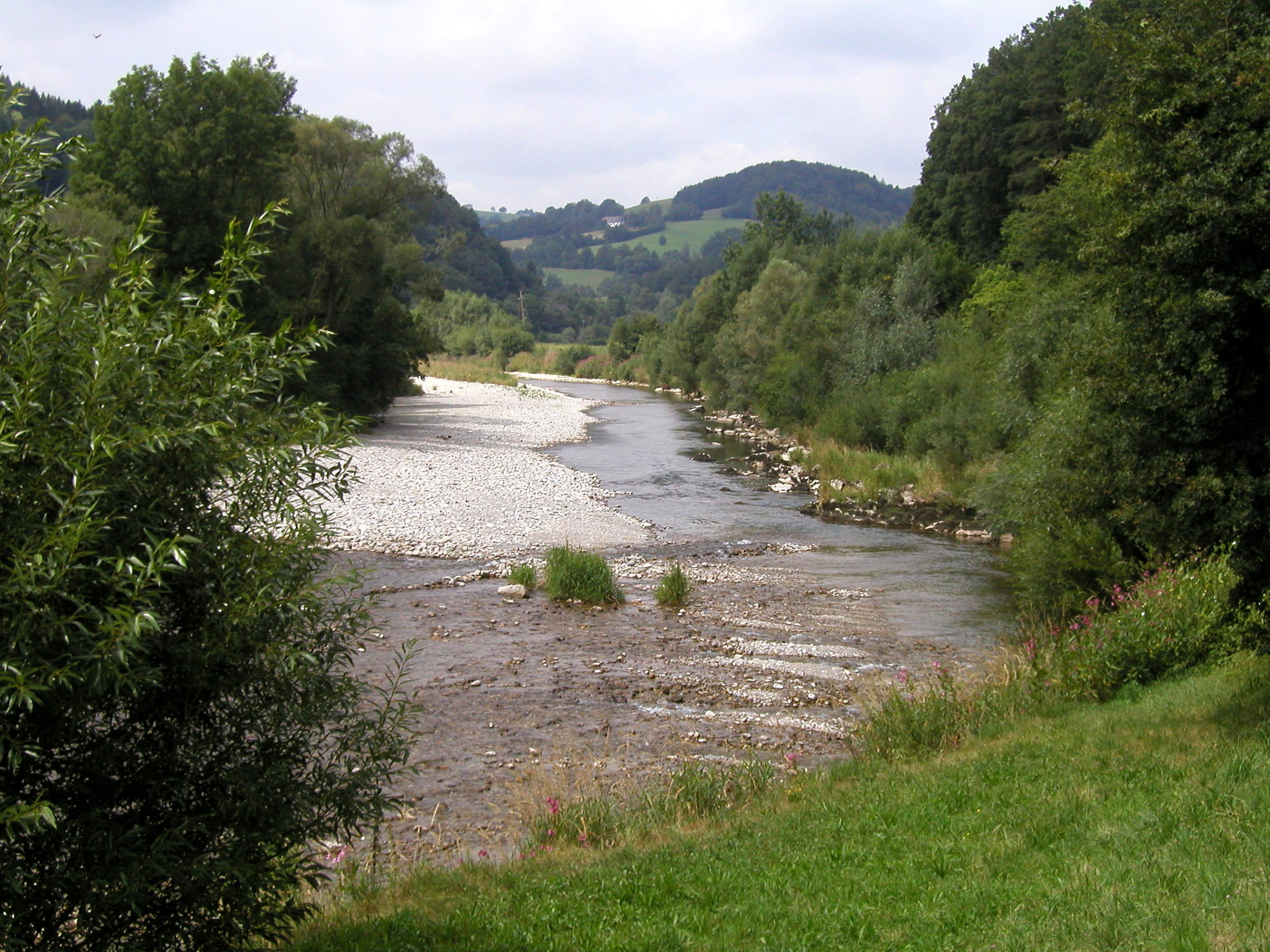
- The Traisen between Traisen and Wilhelmsburg

Location
- Country: Austria
- State: Lower Austria

Physical characteristics
- Source
  - location: near St. Aegyd am Neuwalde and Türnitz
- Mouth
  - location: Danube
  - coordinates: 48°22′20″N 15°51′51″E
- Length: 82.6 km (51.3 mi)
- Basin size: 915 km^{2} (353 sq mi)

Basin features
- Progression: Danube→ Black Sea
- Tributaries
  - right: Gölsen

The Traisen (German pronunciation: [ˈtʀaɪ̯zn̩], pronunciation in local German dialect [ˈtʀaːzn̩]) is a river in Lower Austria. Its drainage basin is 915 km^{2} (353 sq mi).

The Traisen is formed from the rivers Türnitzer Traisen and Unrechttraisen. Its total length, including the Türnitzer Traisen, is 82.6 km (51.3 mi). It is a tributary of the Danube in the Lower Austrian region of Mostviertel. Its two sources begin near St. Aegyd am Neuwalde and Türnitz respectively. After meeting, they flow through the municipalities of Türnitz, Lilienfeld, Traisen, Wilhelmsburg, and St. Pölten, before meeting the Danube at Traismauer. In the course of building the Danube power station Altenwörth, the mouth of the Traisen was relocated to Altenwörth in the municipality of Kirchberg am Wagram.

During a period of extremely high water in July 1997, parts of numerous municipalities along the Traisen, as well as the government quarter of the state capital St. Pölten, were greatly flooded.
