= Traisen =

Traisen can refer to:

Germany:

- Traisen, Germany, a municipality in Rhineland-Palatinate, Germany

Austria:

- Traisen (river), a river in Lower Austria, Austria
- Traisen, Austria, a town in Lower Austria, named after River Traisen

== See also ==
- Traiskirchen, Austria
- Traismauer, Austria, named after River Traisen
