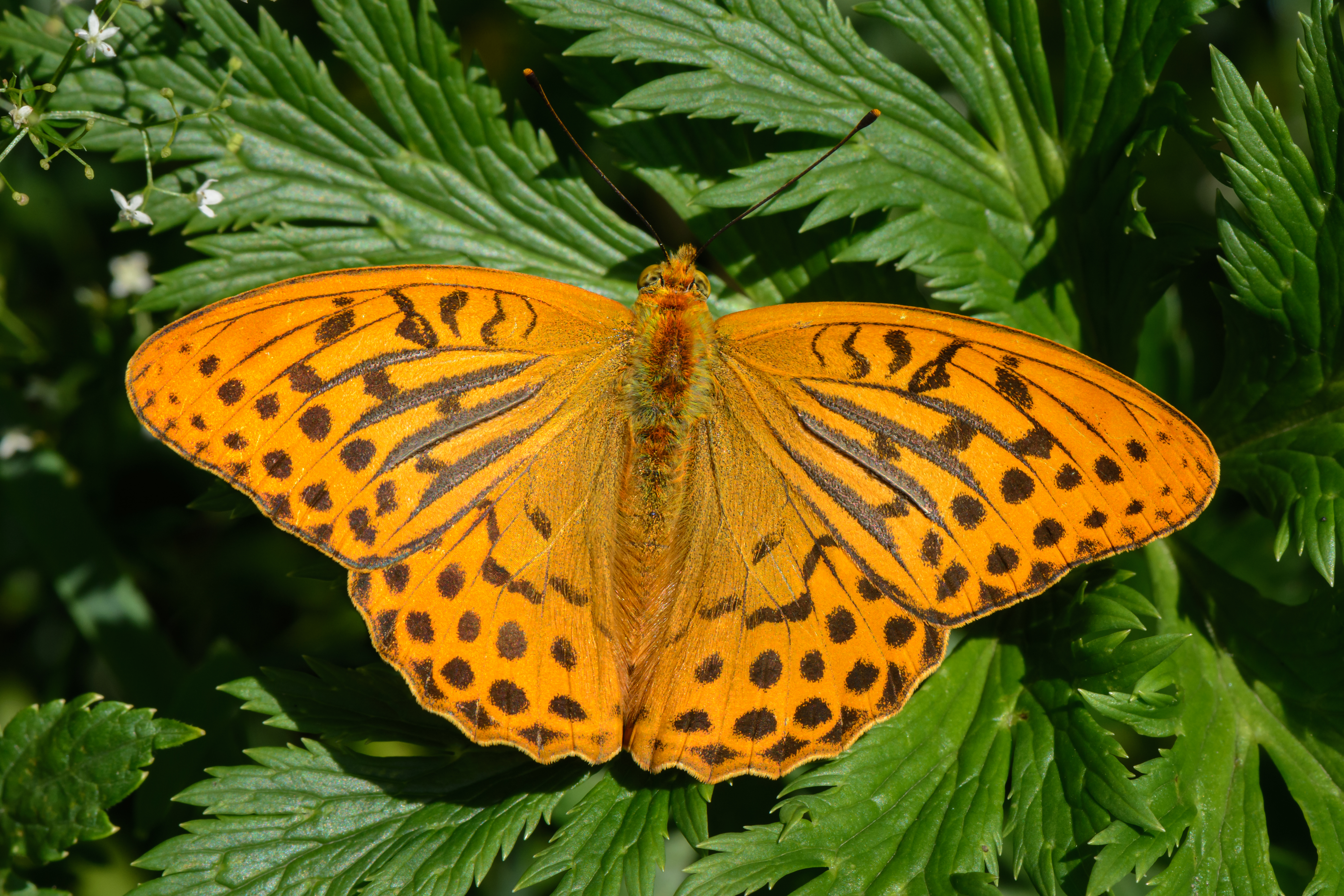
- Male; Mitterbach am Erlaufsee, Lower Austria
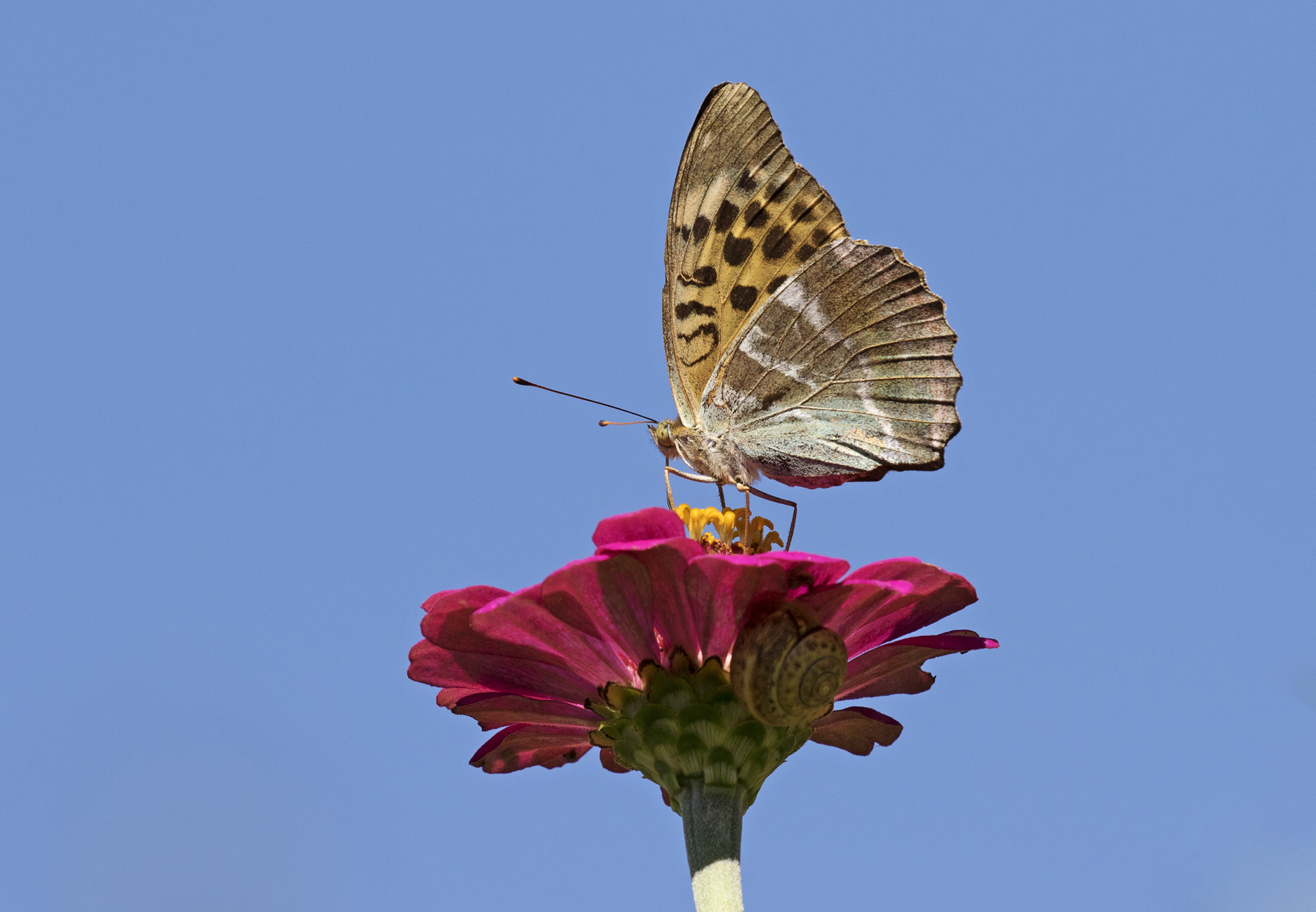
- Female; Lill-Jansskogen, Stockholm

Scientific classification
- Kingdom: Animalia
- Phylum: Arthropoda
- Clade: Pancrustacea
- Class: Insecta
- Order: Lepidoptera
- Family: Nymphalidae
- Genus: Argynnis
- Species: A. paphia

Binomial name
- Argynnis paphia (Linnaeus, 1758)

= Silver-washed fritillary =

Species of butterfly

The silver-washed fritillary (Argynnis paphia) is a common and variable butterfly found over much of the Palearctic realm – Algeria, Europe and across the Palearctic to Japan.

== Description ==
The silver-washed fritillary butterfly is deep orange with black spots on the upperside of its wings. It has a wingspan of 54–70 mm, with the male's being smaller and paler than the female's. The underside is green (verdigris) with a metallic gloss and broad silver bands which are partly curved, hence the name silver-washed. In the male the forewings are rather pointed whereas in the female they are more rounded. On females of the minority valesina form, recurrent in most European populations, the ground color is not fawn but grey with greenish reflections. The caterpillar is black brown with two yellow lines along its back and long reddish-brown spines.

The male possesses scent scales on the upperside of the forewing that run along veins one to four as three distinct scent-streaks. The scent produced from these scales attracts females and helps to distinguish it from other species.

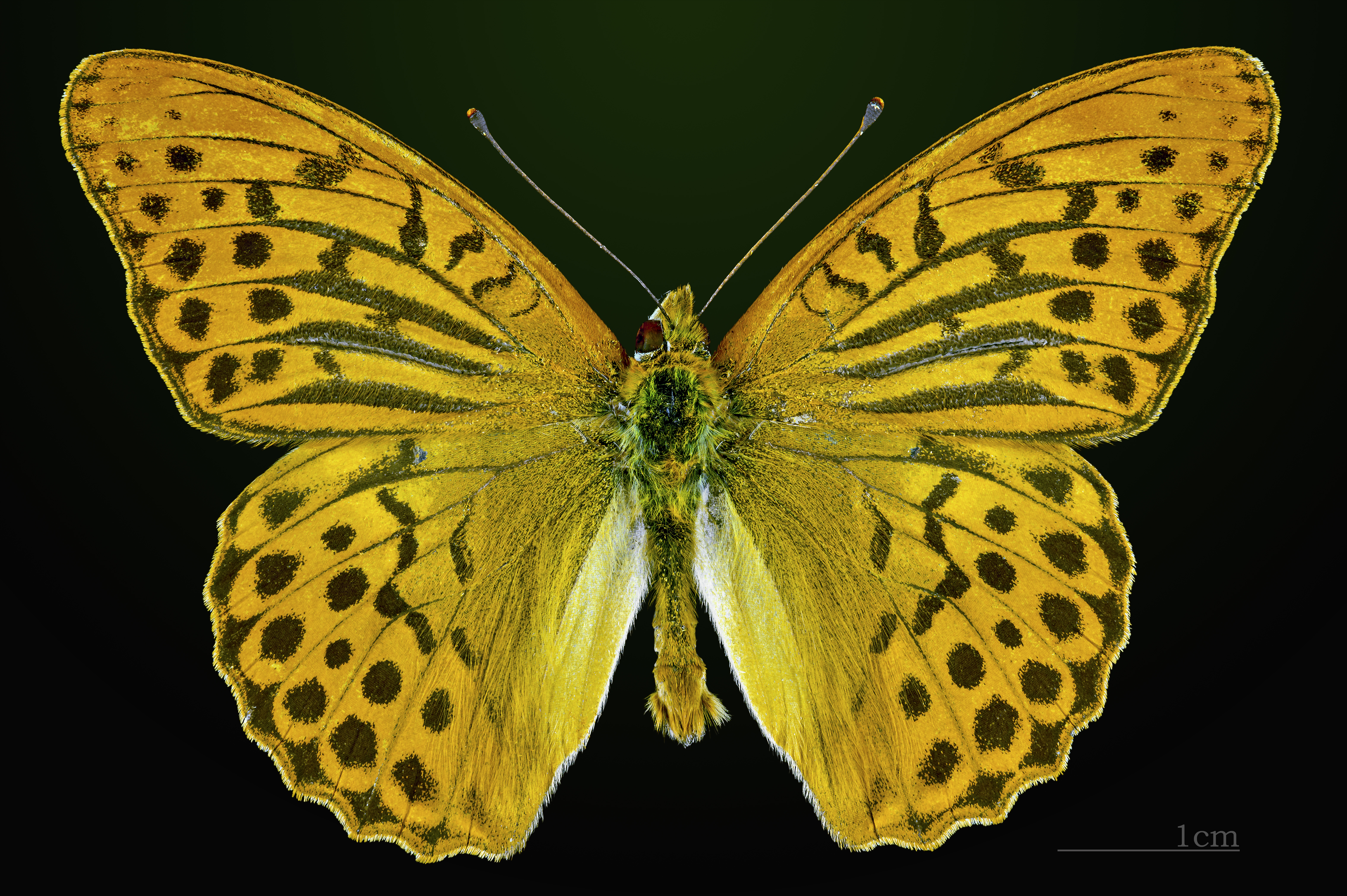
Male

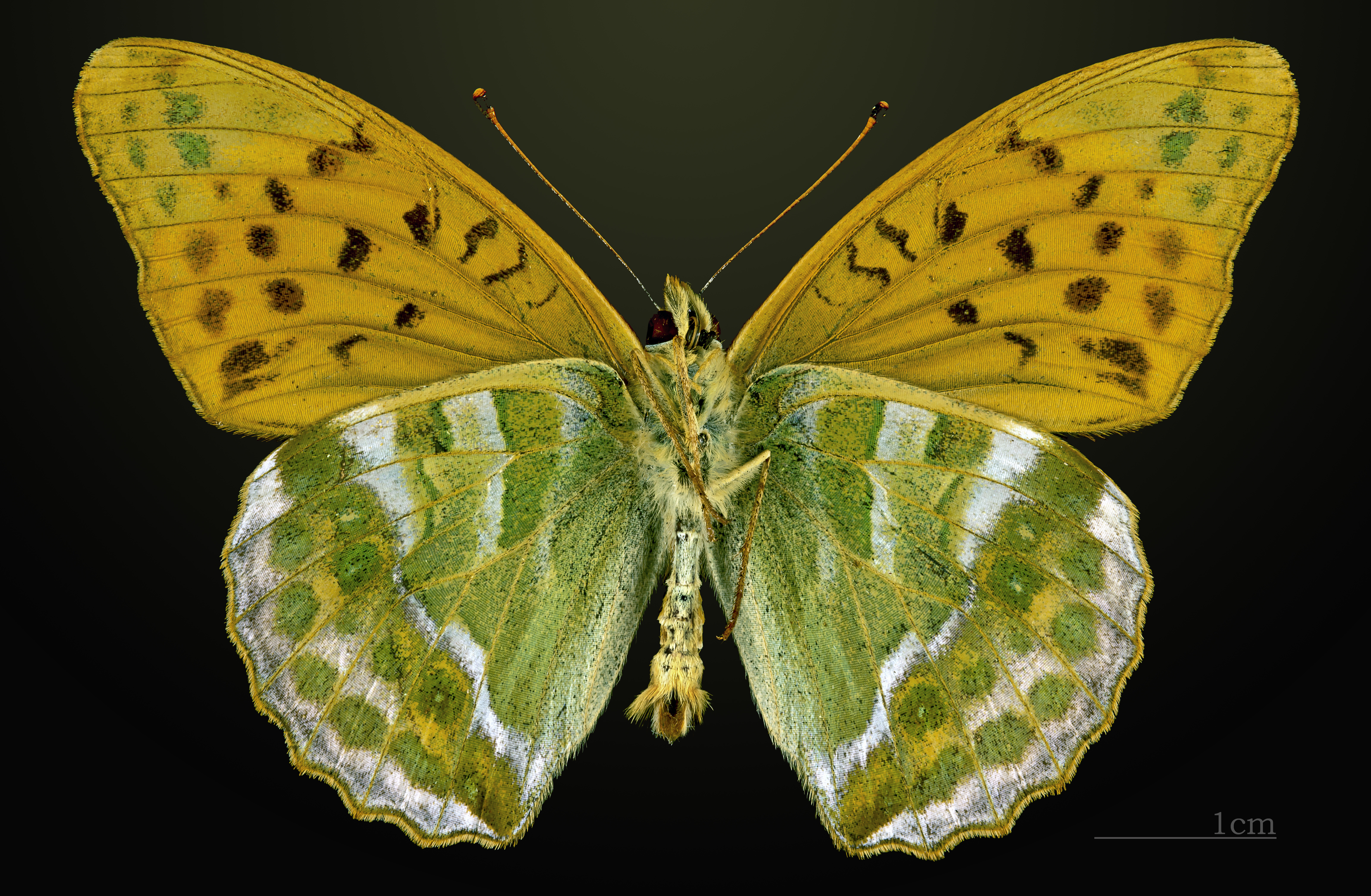
Male underside

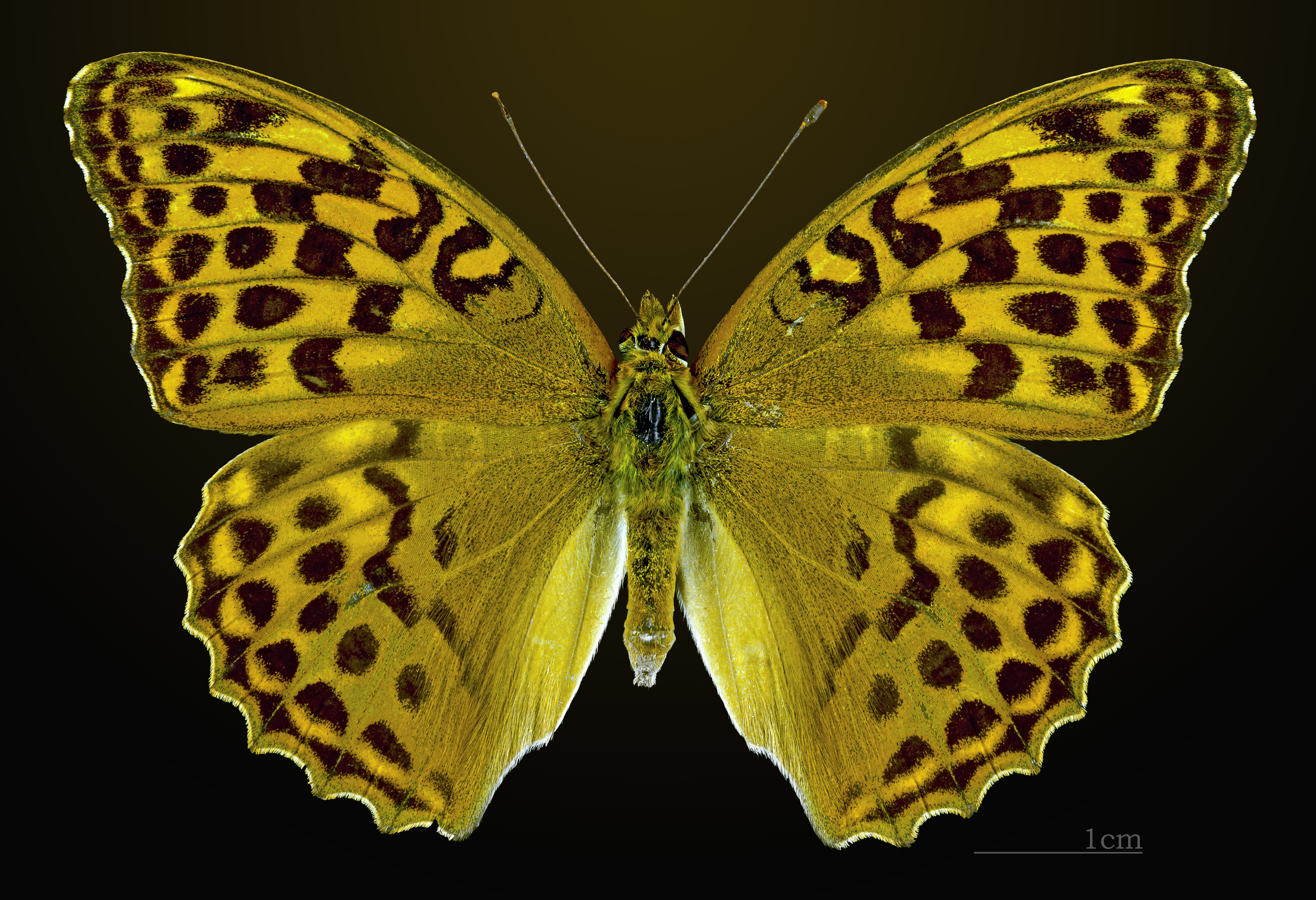
Female

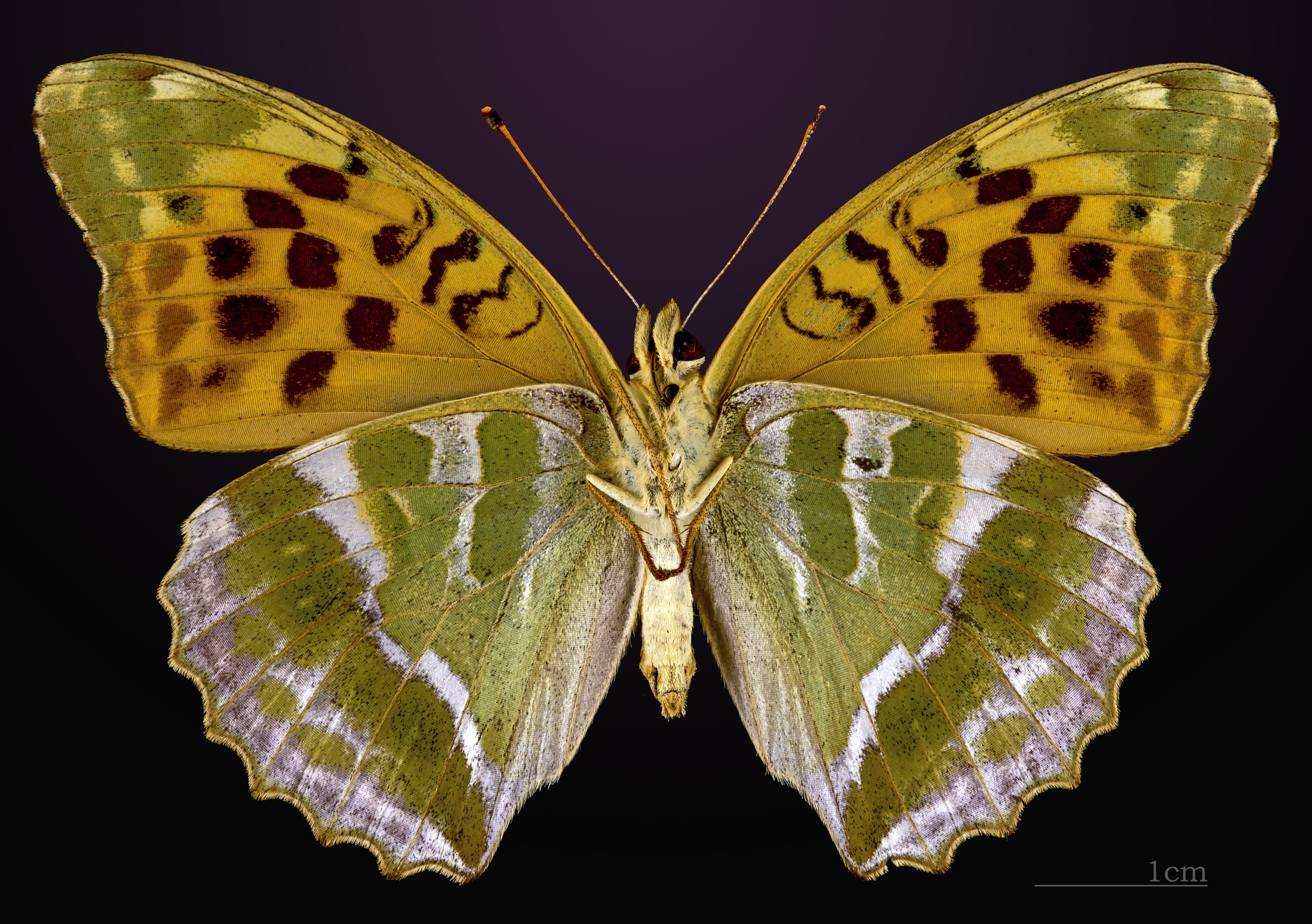
Female underside

== Food resources ==
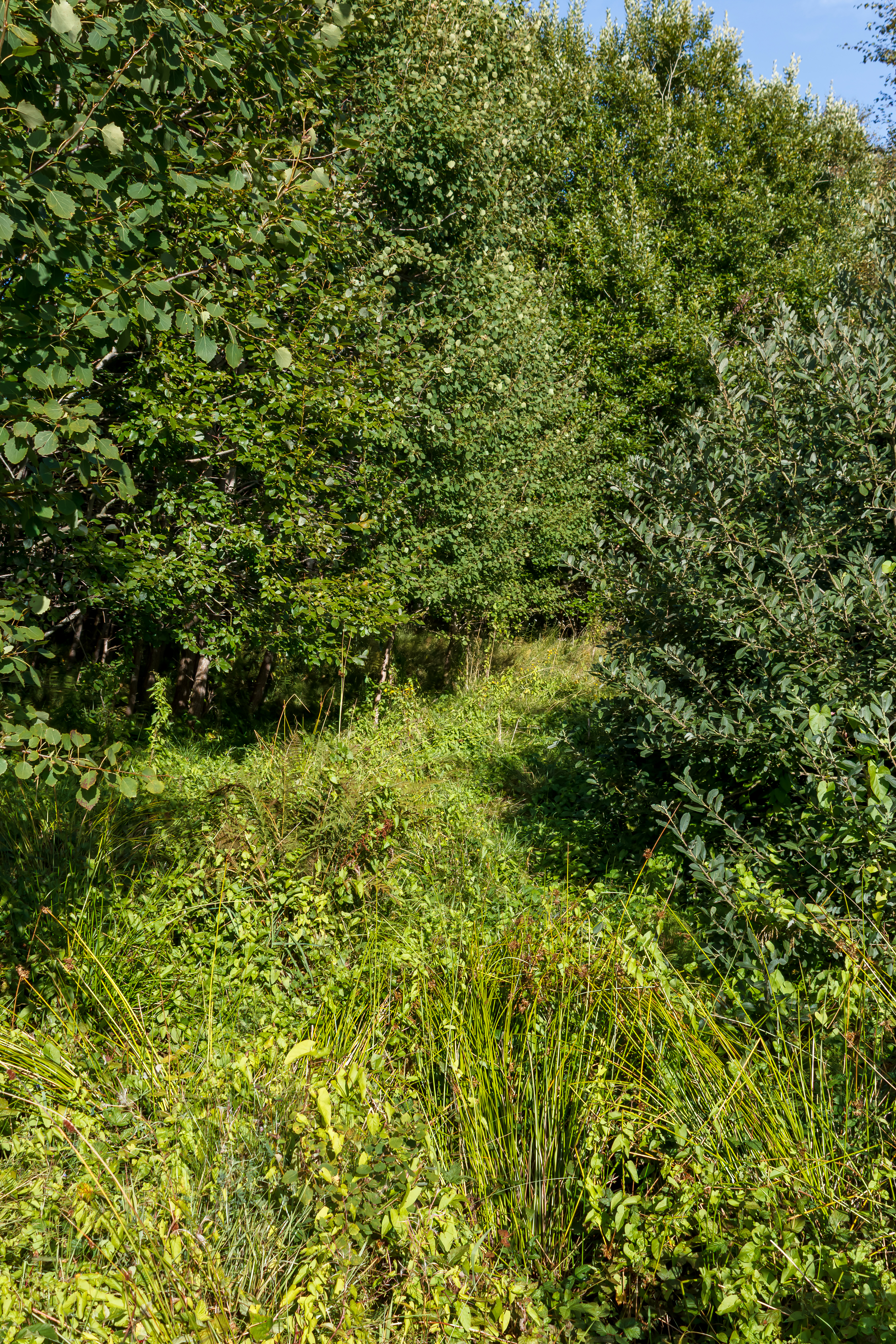
Silver-washed fritillary habitat

Adults feed on the nectar of bramble, thistles, and knapweeds, and also on aphid honeydew. The silver-washed is a strong flier, and more mobile than other fritillaries, and, as such, can be seen gliding above the tree canopy at high speed. Its preferred habitat is thin, sunny, deciduous woodland, especially oaks, but it has been known to live in coniferous woodland.

The main larval food plant of the species is the common dog violet (Viola riviniana).

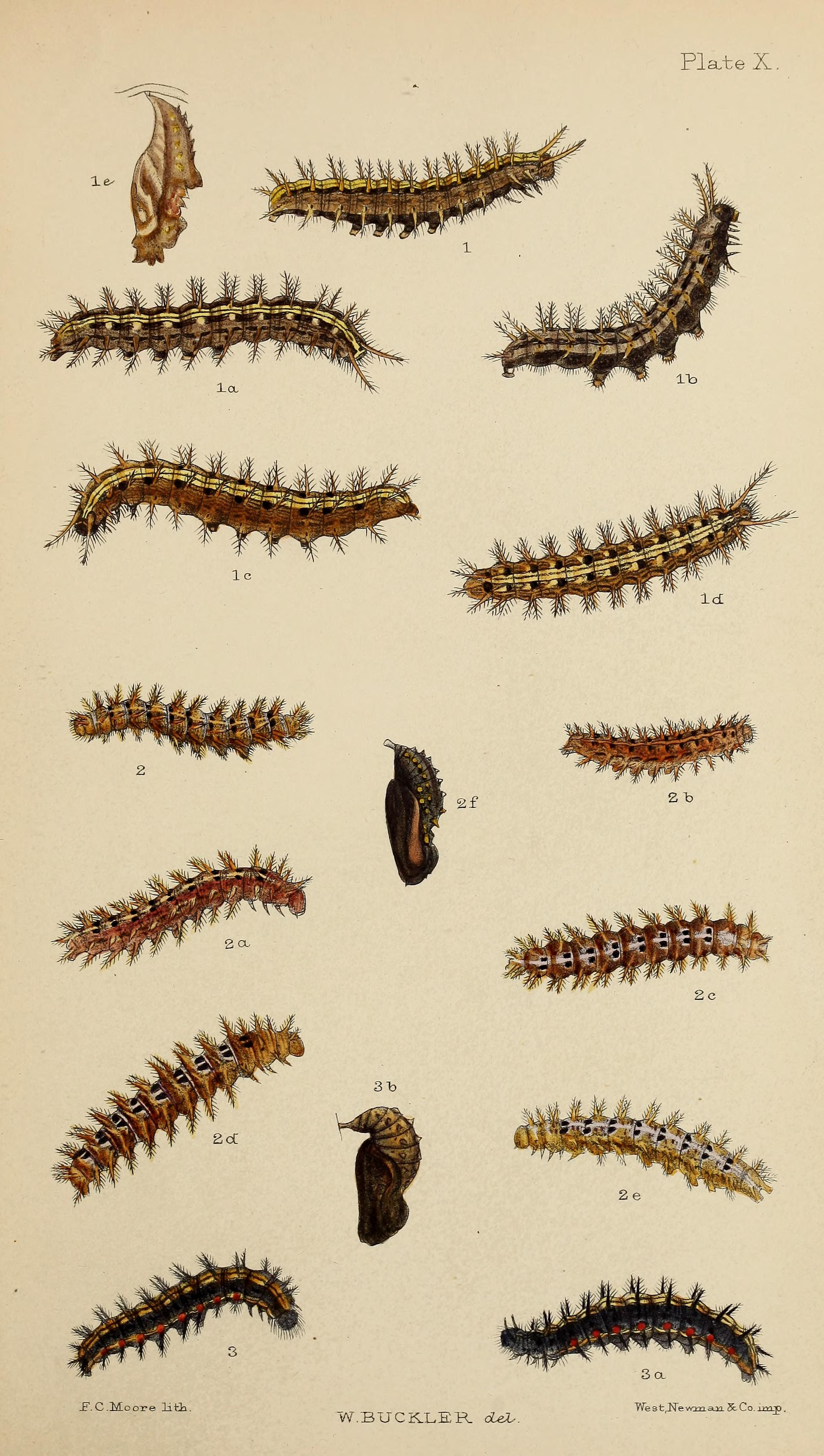
Figs 1,1a,1b,1c,1d larva after last moult 1e pupa

== Life cycle ==
Unusually for a butterfly, the female does not lay her eggs on the leaves or stem of the caterpillar's food source (in this case violets), but instead one or two meters above the woodland floor in the crevices of tree bark close to clumps of violets.

When the egg hatches in August, the caterpillar immediately goes into hibernation until spring. Upon awakening, it will drop to the ground, and feeds on violets close to the base of the tree. The caterpillar usually feeds at night, and usually conceals itself during the day away from its food source, but during cool weather will bask in the sunny spots on the forest floor on dry, dead leaves. It will pupate amongst the ground vegetation, and the adults will emerge in June.

Seitz— The conical, ribbed, yellowish grey eggs are deposited on tree-trunks, particularly pines; the female commences about 4 or 5 ft. above the ground and with a few flappings of the wing flies higher up, depositing an egg at intervalls of 1/2 to 1 m, flying around the tree in a kind of spiral. When reaching a height of about 4 m it leaves the tree in order to begin again in the same way on another one. The larva lives from August until the end of May on Violaceae, hibernating very small (Gillmer) and beginning to feed already in March.It is blackish brown, with a broad yellow dorsal stripe divided by a thin black line, and with numerous yellow dots, spots and streaks on the sides; the spines long, yellow at the base, the two anterior ones curved and prolonged, resembling antennae. The pupa is usually fastened low down on a pine-trunk; it is greyish brown, with pointed processes on the head and sharp angles, and has conical pointed tubercles, which are at first silvery and become golden before the emergence of the butterfly. The species is on the wing in Europe from July till September, in Eastern Asia til October; it is very common everywhere and flies particularly on broad roads in the forest and at the edges of woods. The butterflies visit especially the flowers of brambles, scabious and thistles, on which they can easily be caught. When desirous to mate the male circles around the female, while the latter is flying with even flappings of the wings straight for a bush or a projecting branch. Here copulation takes place, the sexes being often so strongly united that they remain together for some time, frequently the one individual carrying the other about.

== Subspecies ==
- A. p. paphia
  - female f. valesina (Esper, 1798) ground colour grey
  - f.anargyra Stgr. extreme south of Europe the hindwing beneath devoid of silver, the bands being dull ochreous on an often feebly green ground.
  - immaculata Bell. underside bands without silvery gloss.
  - ab. atroviridis Kollm. North Africa without silver; the male has the upperside fiery red; the hindwing beneath is beautifully bright yellow, sometimes without any trace of green, in other individuals with greyish green bands.
- A. p. delila Röber, 1896 Turkey
- A. p. tsushimana Fruhstorfer, 1906 (70e) is according to Fruhstorfer, the most beautifully coloured of all the paphia-forms.Japan.The bands of the hindwing beneath are even darker green than in valesina, also the apex of the forewing being very deep sea-green. The silver-bands of the hindwing are exceptionally broadly while and very prominent, and the green submarginal spots are more isolated and not so diffuse as in Chinese paphia.
- A. p. neopaphia Fruhstorfer, 1907 Amur, Ussuri, Sakhalin, Kuriles, Transbaikal, Kamchatka
- neopaphia Fruhst. (70e) is the name for the Amur specimens, which are intermediate in size and colour between the small true paphia and the large paphioides.
- A. p. megalegoria Fruhstorfer, 1907 Szechuan, Yunnan The Chinese forms are all larger than European paphia, the females being the largest of all, surpassing even the African form. The hindwing beneath is more abundantly dusted with green than in Europe, but remains lighter than in Japanese specimens. This is megalegoria Fruhst.
- A. p. thalassata Fruhstorfer, 1908 SouthEast Europe Towards east one meets already in Eastern Germany (Konigsberg) a modified form of paphia. In Eastern Russia specimens with a darker upperside and more sharply defined silver-bands are a transition towards the Asiatic forms: thalassata Fruhst.
- A. p. dives Oberthür, 1908 Algeria The most magnificent form without silver is the one from North Africa; the male has the upperside fiery red; the hindwing beneath is beautifully bright yellow, sometimes without any trace of green, in other individuals with greyish green bands. The female differs less from Central and North European specimens, but has the hindwing more strongly dentate, as is also the case in the male. This is diva Oberth.
- A. p. argyrorrhytes Alphéraky, 1908 N.Caucasus Major A very remarkable form with the metallic bands of the underside confluent.Occurs in the Caucasus: argyrorrhytes Alph. (71a)
- A. p. argyrophontes Oberthür, 1923 Southwest China
- A. p. virescens Nakahara, 1926 Kuriles
- A. p. formosicola Matsumura, 1927 Formosa
- A. p. geisha Hemming, 1941 Japan Among the Eastern-Asiatic forms we find paphioides = A. p. geisha Hemming, 1941 Btlr. but little different from the European form; it is larger, and the female is darker, although not so dark as valesina; from Japan, where I still met with quite worn specimens as late as October at Hiogo.
- A. p. masandarensis Gross & Ebert, 1975 Iran, Caucasus, Transcaucasus
- A. p. angustia Churkin & Pletnev, 2012 Kyrgyzstan
- Argynnis p. angustia Churkin & Pletnev, 2012 Kyrgyzstan, Ferghansky Mts, W.Urum-Bash R., Arkhangel'skoye v., 1600m

== Conservation ==
The silver-washed fritillary was in decline in the UK for much of the 1970s and 1980s, but seems to be coming back to many of its old territories.

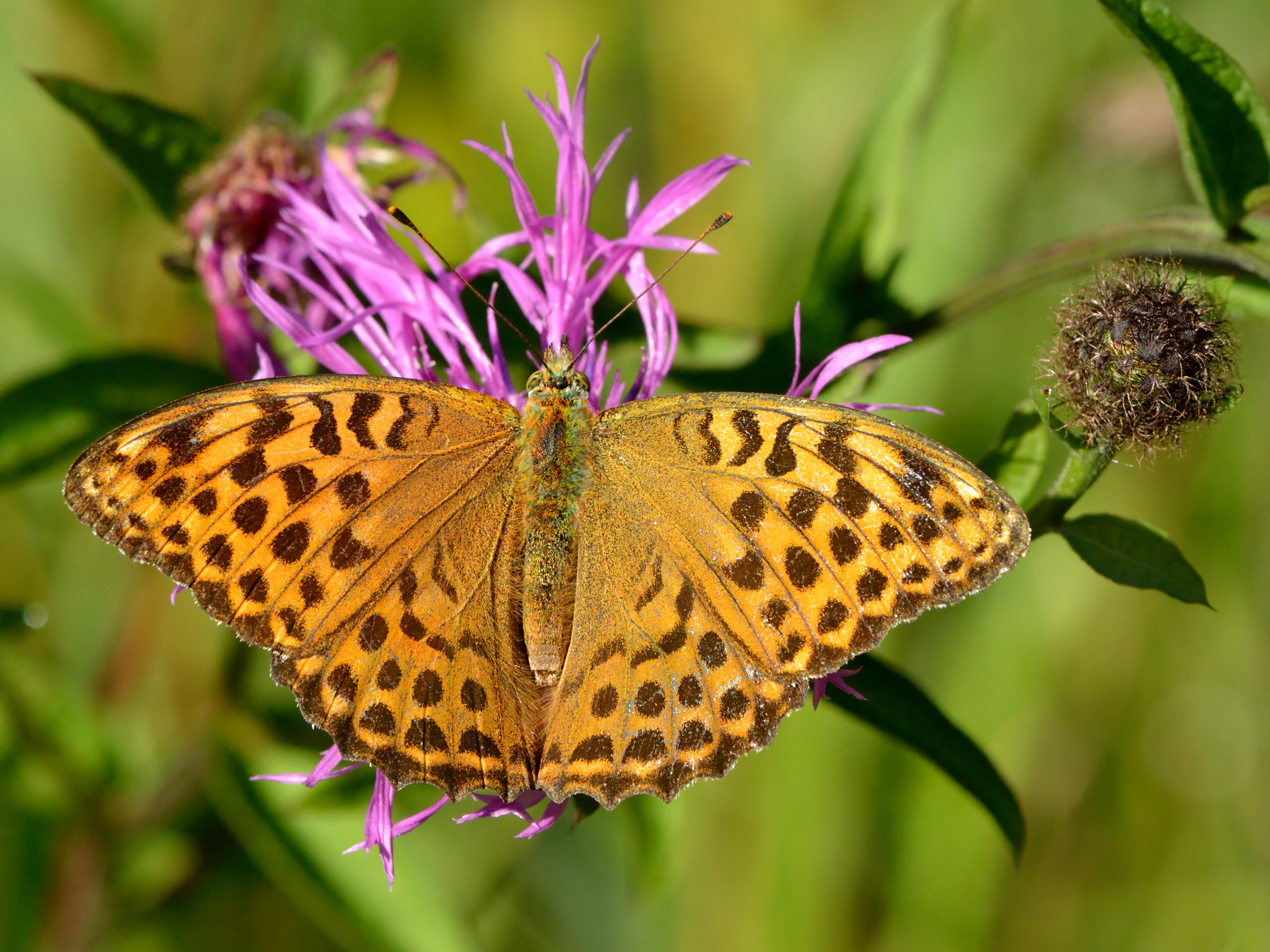
Female

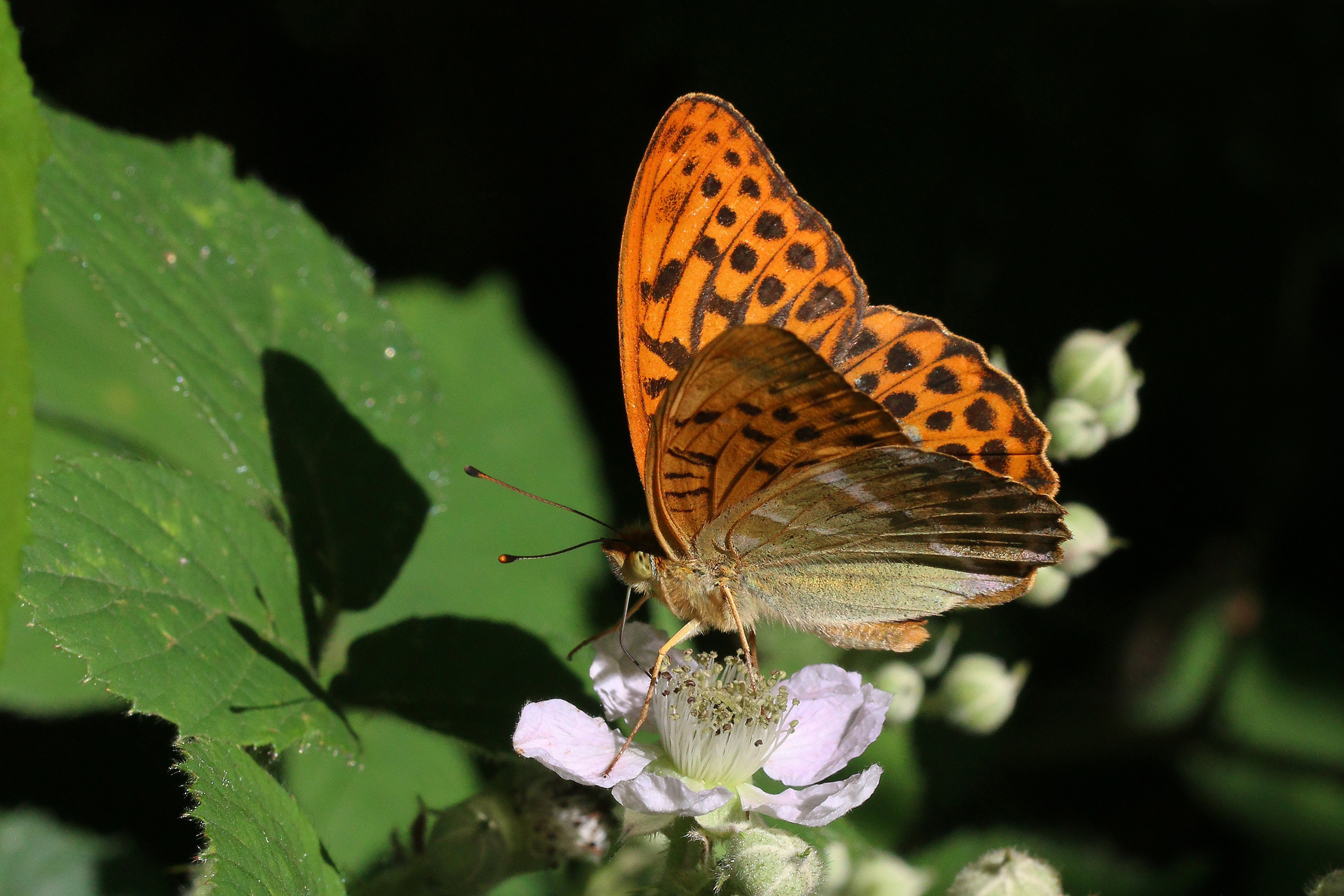
Male

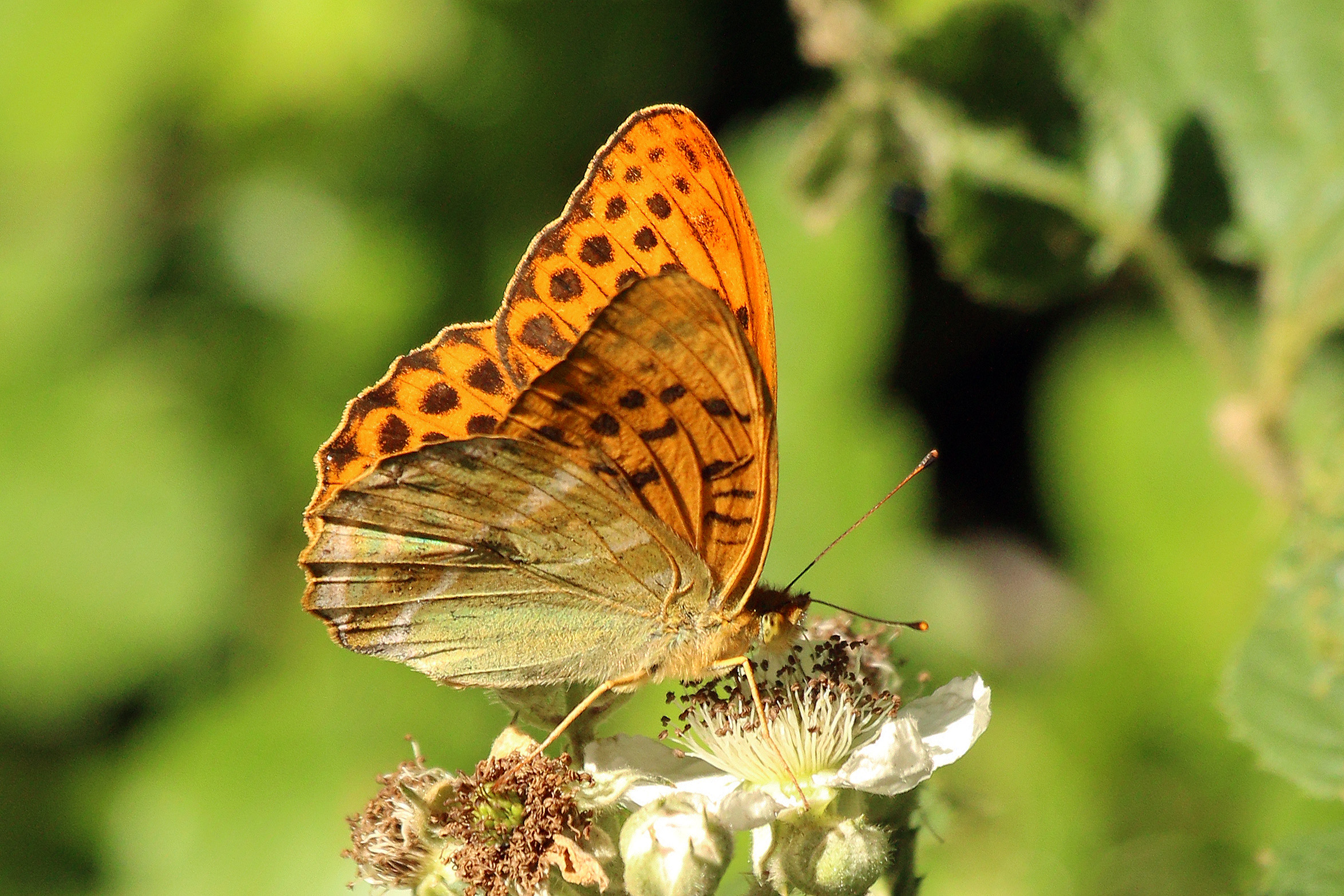
Male underside

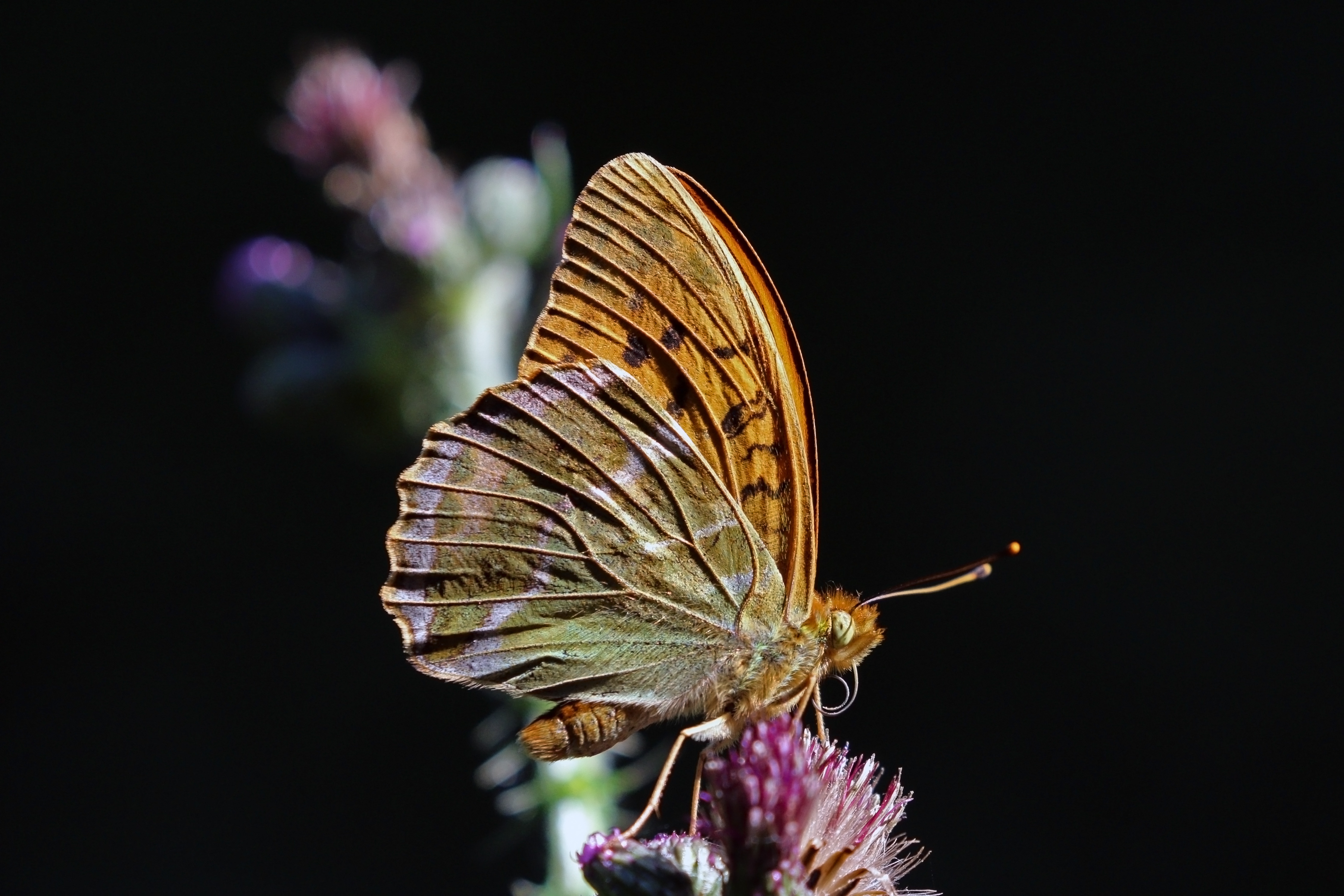
Female underside

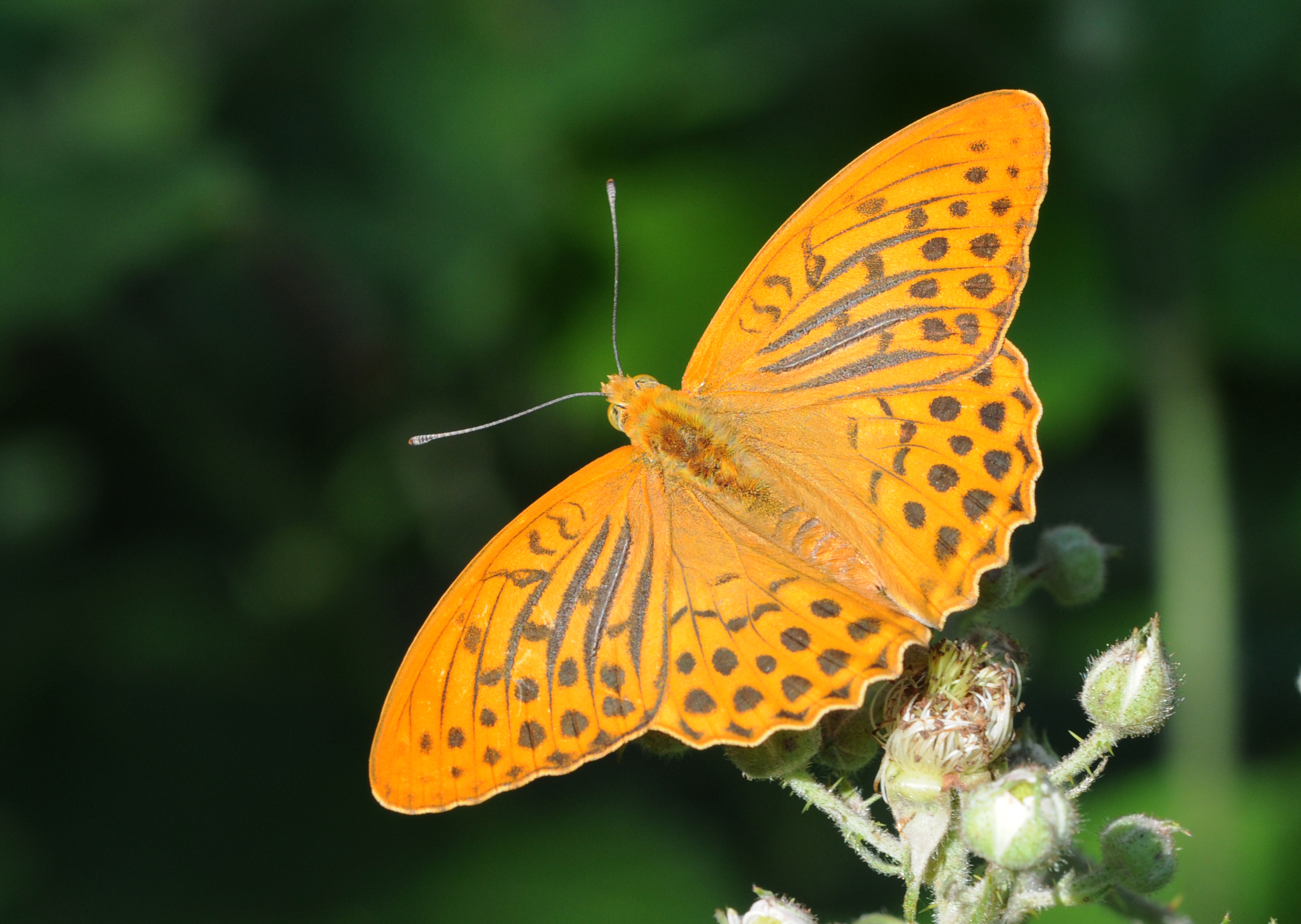
Male

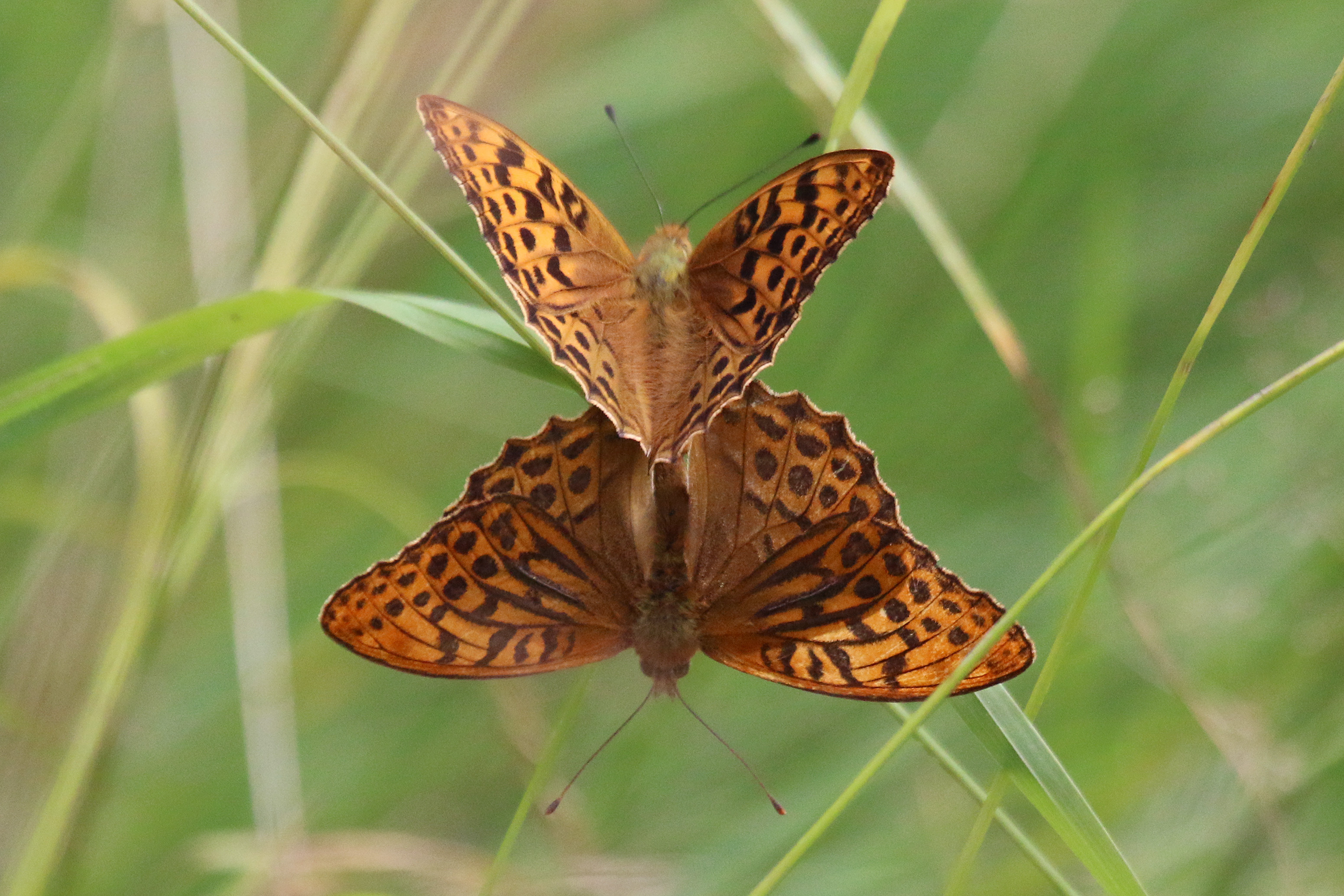
Mating

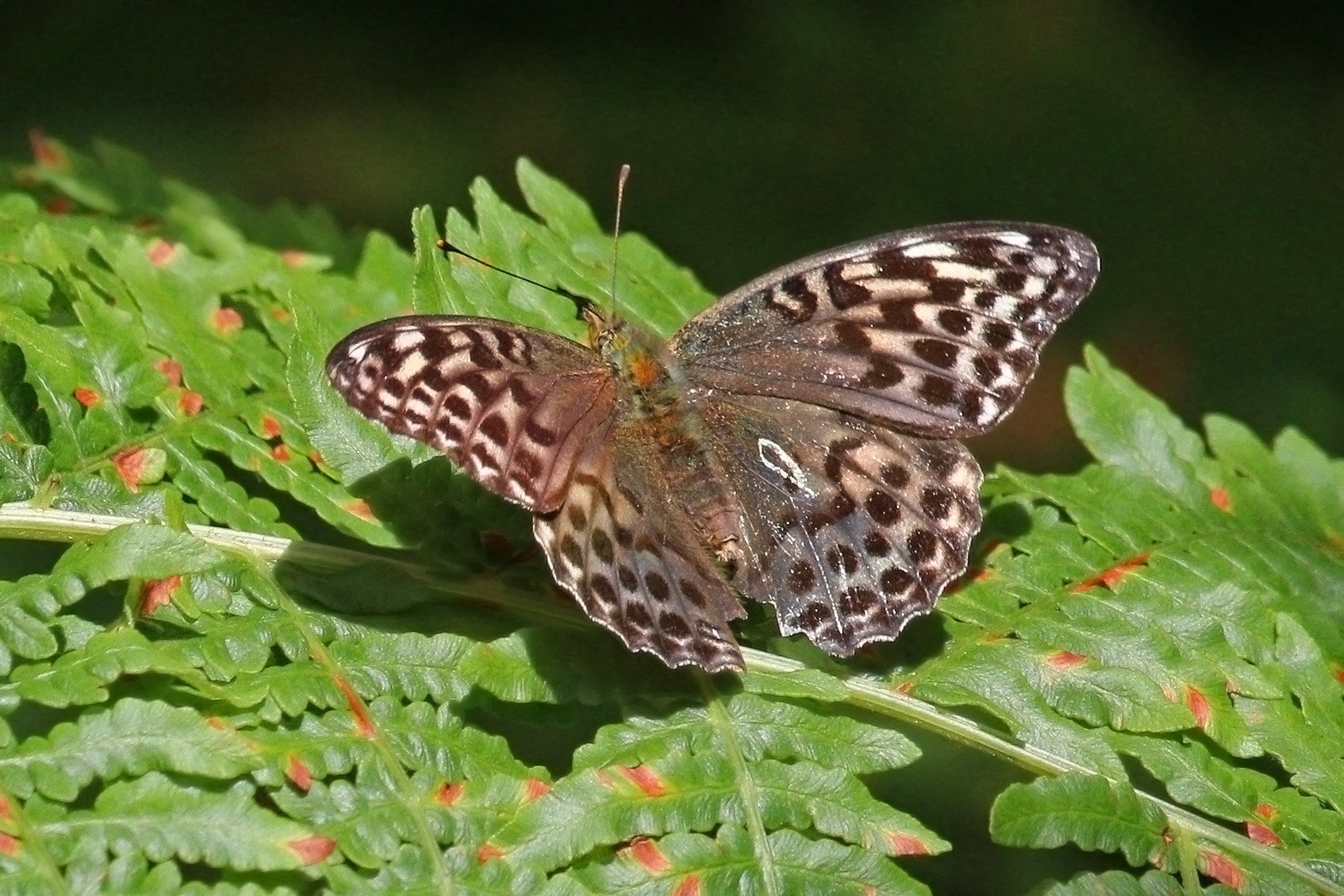
Female, female form valesina orange-brown colour replaced with a deep olive-green.

== Etymology ==
Named in the Classical tradition.Aphrodite Paphia is a goddess who arose out of white foam on the waves/ Aphrodite is the goddess of love and beauty.
