= Rohrbach an der Gölsen =

- Municipality
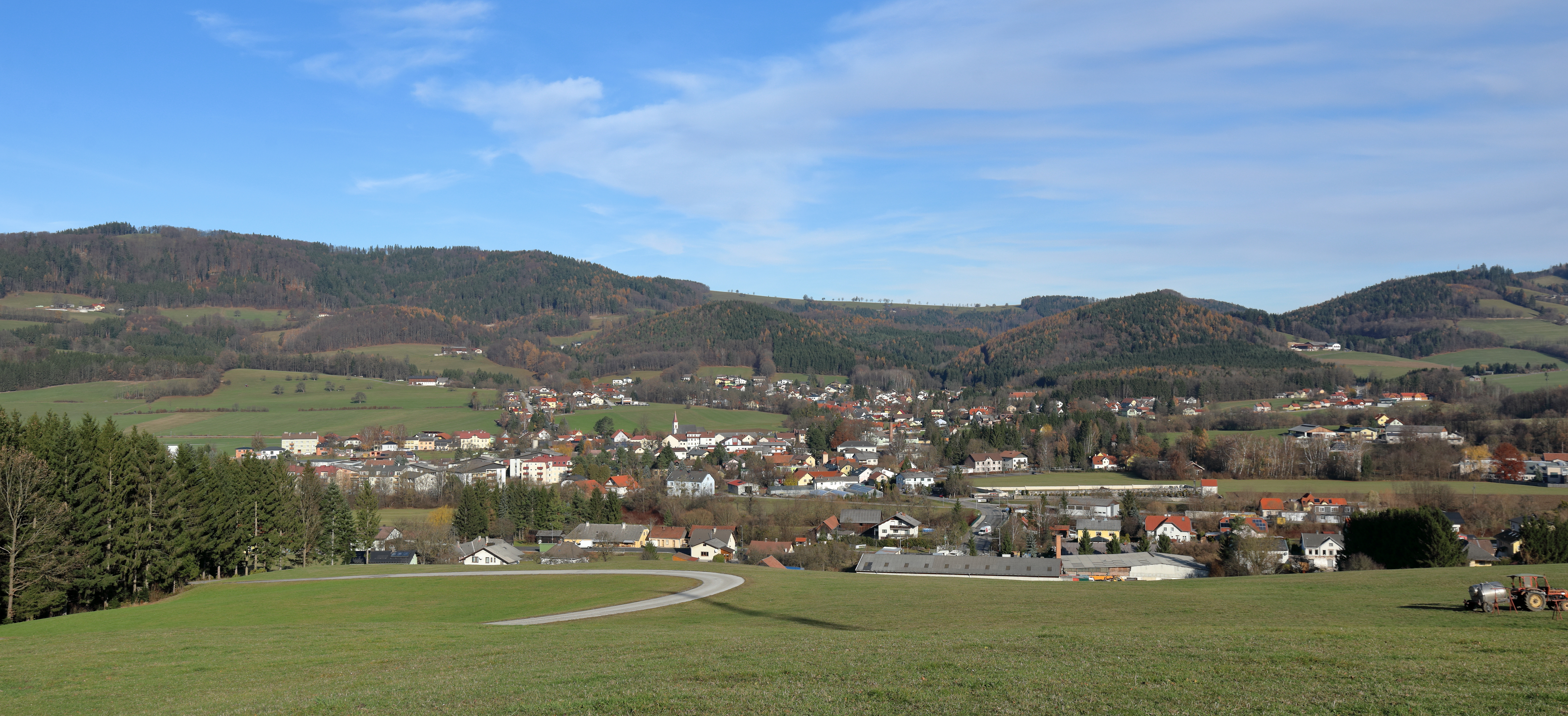

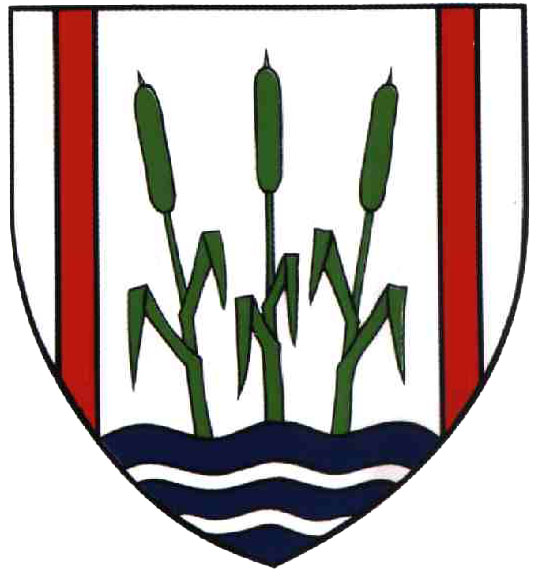
- Coat of arms

- Location within Austria
- Coordinates: 48°3′N 15°45′E
- Country: Austria
- State: Lower Austria
- District: Lilienfeld

Government
  - Mayor: Karl Bader

Area
  - Total: 14.77 km^{2} (5.70 sq mi)
- Elevation: 402 m (1,319 ft)

Population (2018-01-01)
  - Total: 1,556
  - Density: 105.3/km^{2} (272.9/sq mi)
- Time zone: UTC+1 (CET)
  - Summer (DST): UTC+2 (CEST)
- Postal code: 3163
- Area code: 02764
- Website: www.rohrbach-goelsen.gv.at

Rohrbach an der Gölsen is a town in the district of Lilienfeld in the Austrian state of Lower Austria.

== Geography ==
Rohrbach an der Gölsen lies in the Mostviertel in Lower Austria. About 41.27 percent of the municipality is forested.
