= Josefsberg Pass =

Mountain pass in Lilienfeld District, Austria

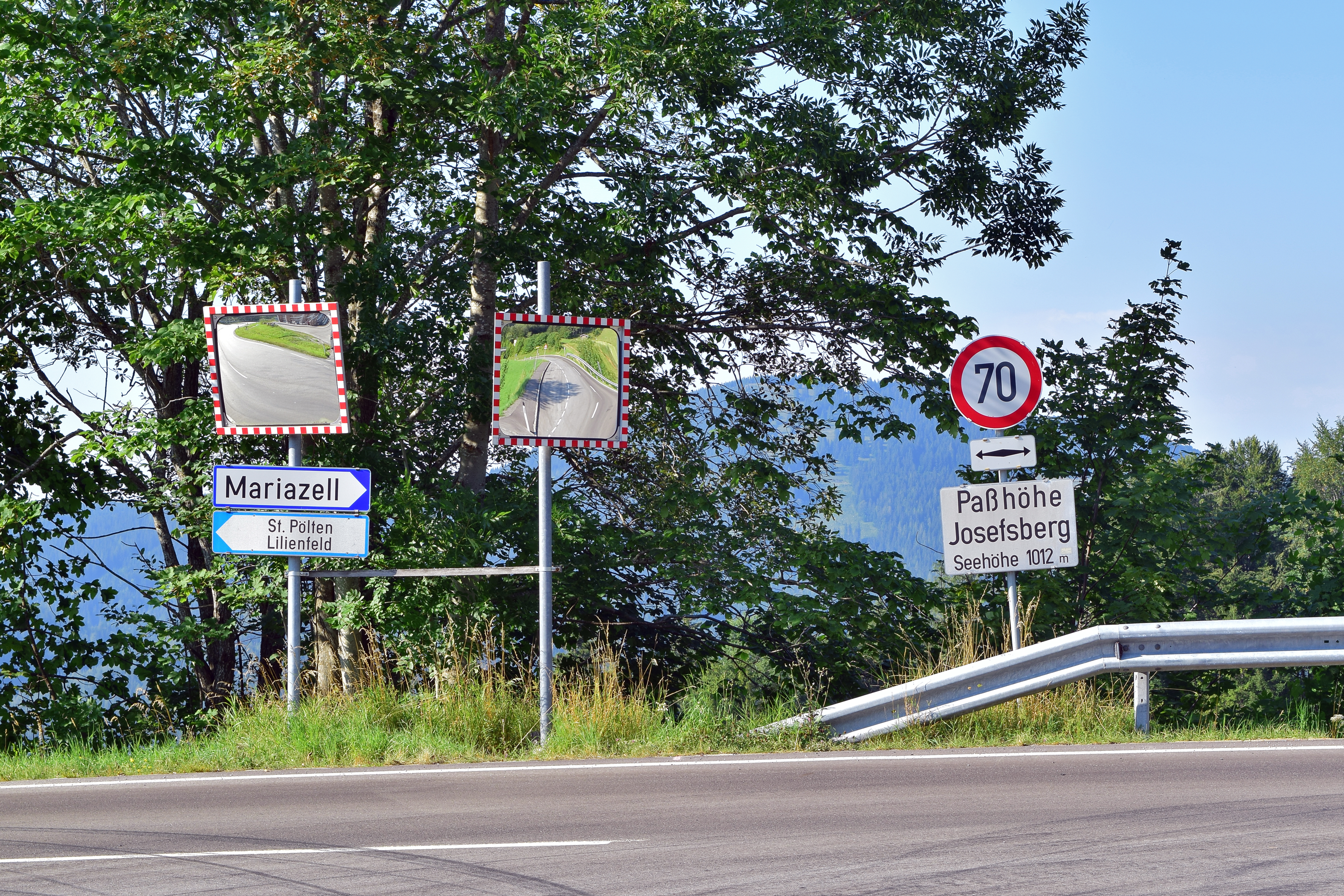

- Location within Alps
- Elevation: 1,012 metres (3,320 ft)

Third Approach
- Location: Austria
- Range: Alps
- Coordinates: 47°50′N 15°18′E

Josefsberg Pass (el. 1,012 metres [3,320 ft]) is a high mountain pass in the Austrian Alps in the Bundesland of Lower Austria.

It connects Annaberg and Mitterbach and has a maximum grade of 10 percent.

== See also ==
- List of highest paved roads in Europe
- List of mountain passes
