= St. Veit an der Gölsen =

Sankt Veit an der Gölsen
- Municipality
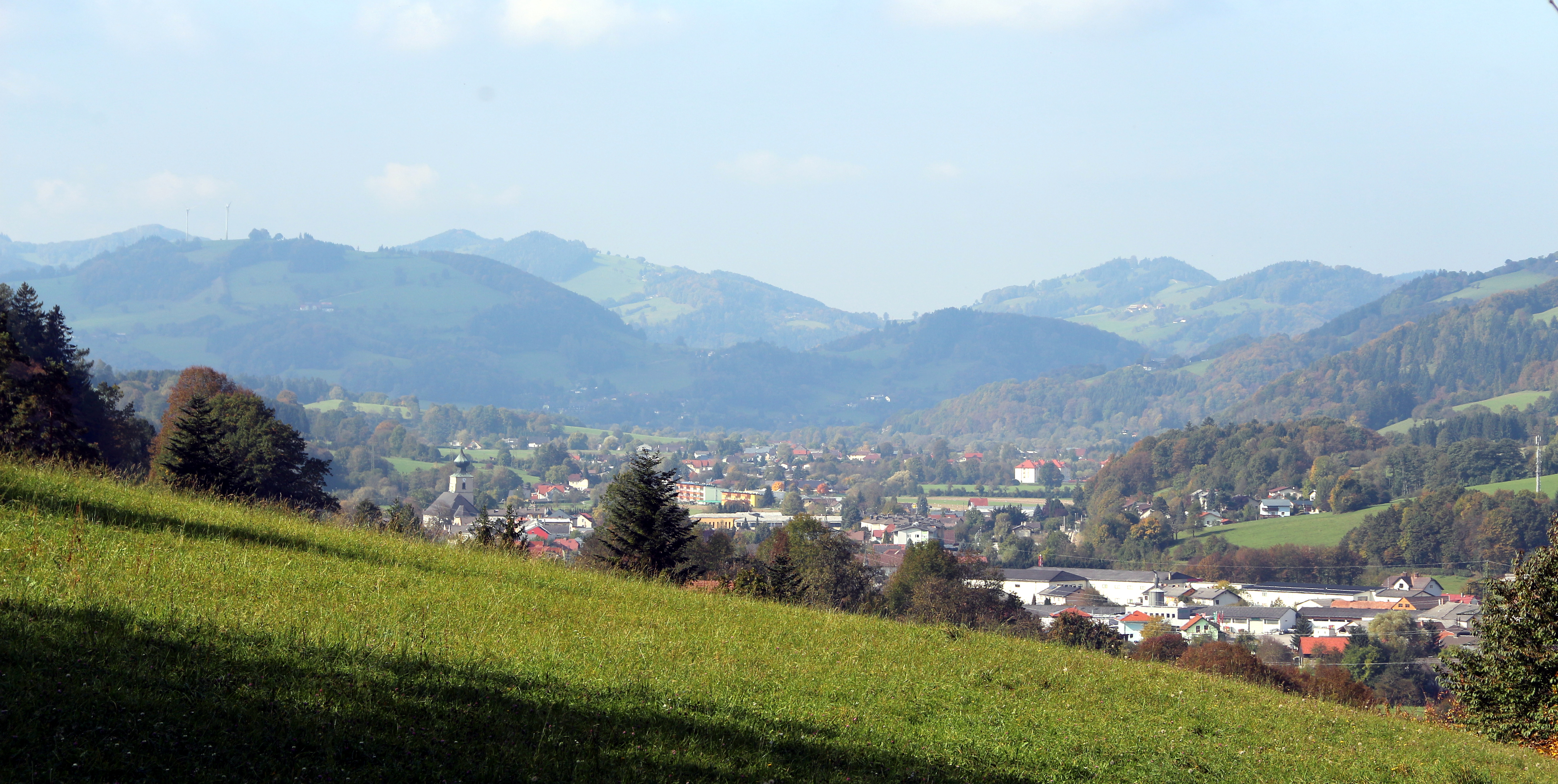

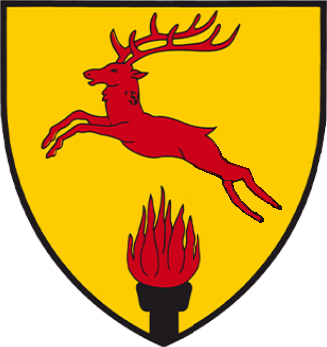
- Coat of arms

- Location within Austria
- Coordinates: 48°2′N 15°40′E
- Country: Austria
- State: Lower Austria
- District: Lilienfeld

Government
  - Mayor: Johann Gastegger

Area
  - Total: 78.14 km^{2} (30.17 sq mi)
- Elevation: 369 m (1,211 ft)

Population (2018-01-01)
  - Total: 3,915
  - Density: 50.10/km^{2} (129.8/sq mi)
- Time zone: UTC+1 (CET)
  - Summer (DST): UTC+2 (CEST)
- Postal code: 3161
- Area code: 02763
- Website: www.st-veit-goelsen.gv.at

Sankt Veit an der Gölsen is a town in the district of Lilienfeld in the Austrian federal state of Lower Austria.

== Geography ==
Sankt Veit an der Gölsen is located in the Mostviertel at the south-western edge of the Vienna Woods and at the beginning of the Lower Austrian Prealps. The river Gölsen flows through the municipal territory. The area of the town is 78.12 square kilometer, whereby 55.98% consists of woodland area.

Parts of the town are Außer-Wiesenbach, Inner-Wiesenbach, Kerschenbach, Kropfsdorf, Maierhöfen, Obergegend, Pfenningbach, Rainfeld, Schwarzenbach an der Gölsen, St. Veit an der Gölsen, Steinwandleiten, Traisenort, Wiesenfeld and Wobach.

== History ==
In the antiquity the territory was part of the province Noricum. Located in the Austrian core country Lower Austria it took part in the changeful history of Austria.

== Population ==
Historical population
Year	Pop.	±%
1869	2,609	—
1890	2,813	+7.8%
1900	3,272	+16.3%
1910	3,815	+16.6%
1923	3,739	−2.0%
1939	3,701	−1.0%
1951	3,501	−5.4%
1961	3,710	+6.0%
1971	3,759	+1.3%
1981	3,593	−4.4%
1991	3,696	+2.9%
2001	3,859	+4.4%
2011	3,911	+1.3%
2014	3,910	−0.0%

== Politics ==
The Mayor of the town is Johann Gastegger. After the election in 2010 for the local government the SPÖ has 15 mandates, the ÖVP has 7 mandates and the FPÖ has one mandate.

== Notable residents ==
- Clemens Lashofer (February 2, 1941 - July 6, 2009) - Abbot of Göttweig Abbey.
