= Burgruine Araburg =

Castle in Lower Austria, Austria

- Kaumberg, Lower Austria
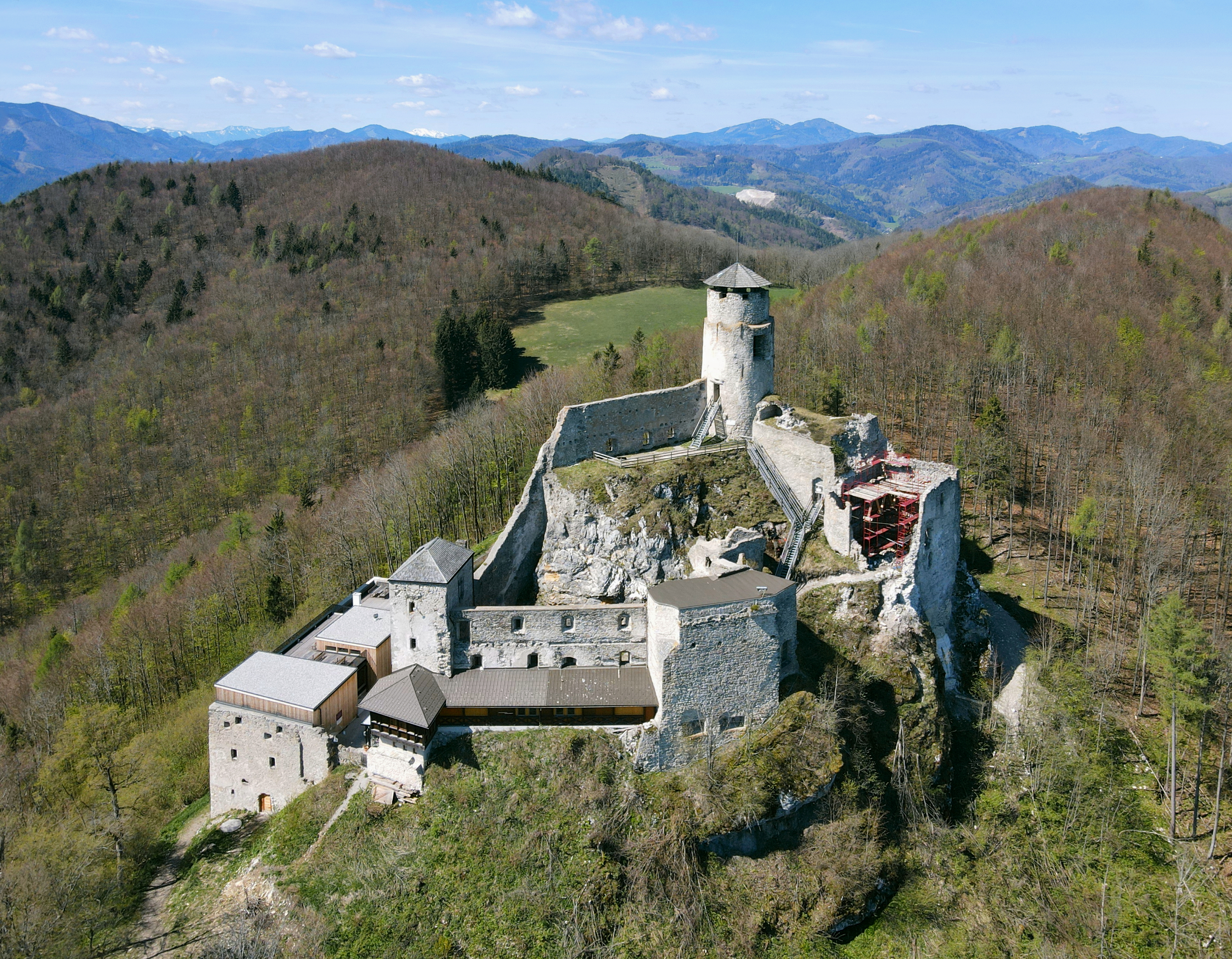
- Northeast view of Araburg

Site information
- Condition: In ruins

Location
- Coordinates: 48.01082°N 15.86741°E

Site history
- Built: 1180

Burgruine Araburg is a castle in Lower Austria, Austria. Burgruine Araburg is 776 metres (2,546 ft) above sea level, making it the highest castle ruin in Lower Austria.

== Gallery ==
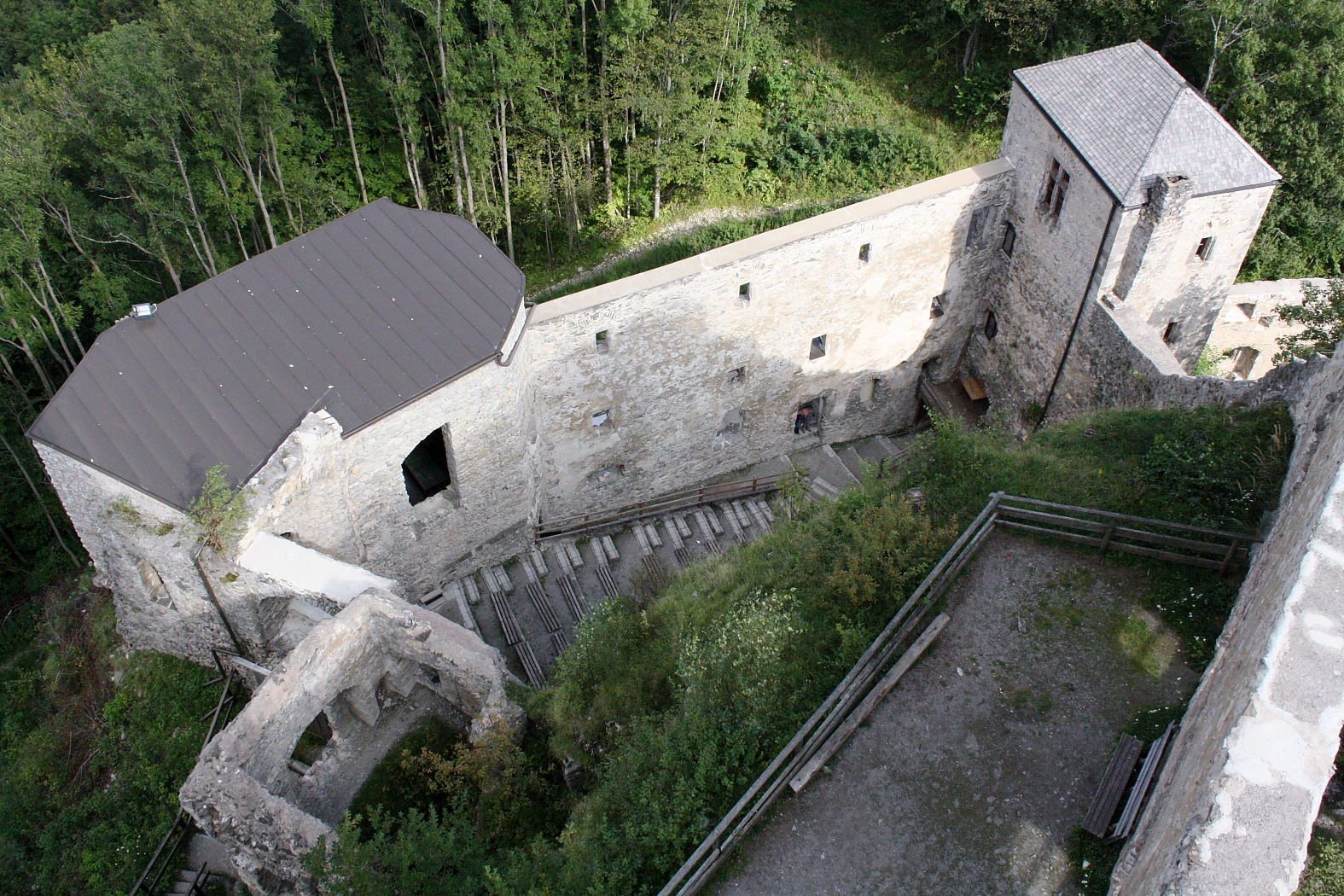
East side of Araburg castle seen from the keep

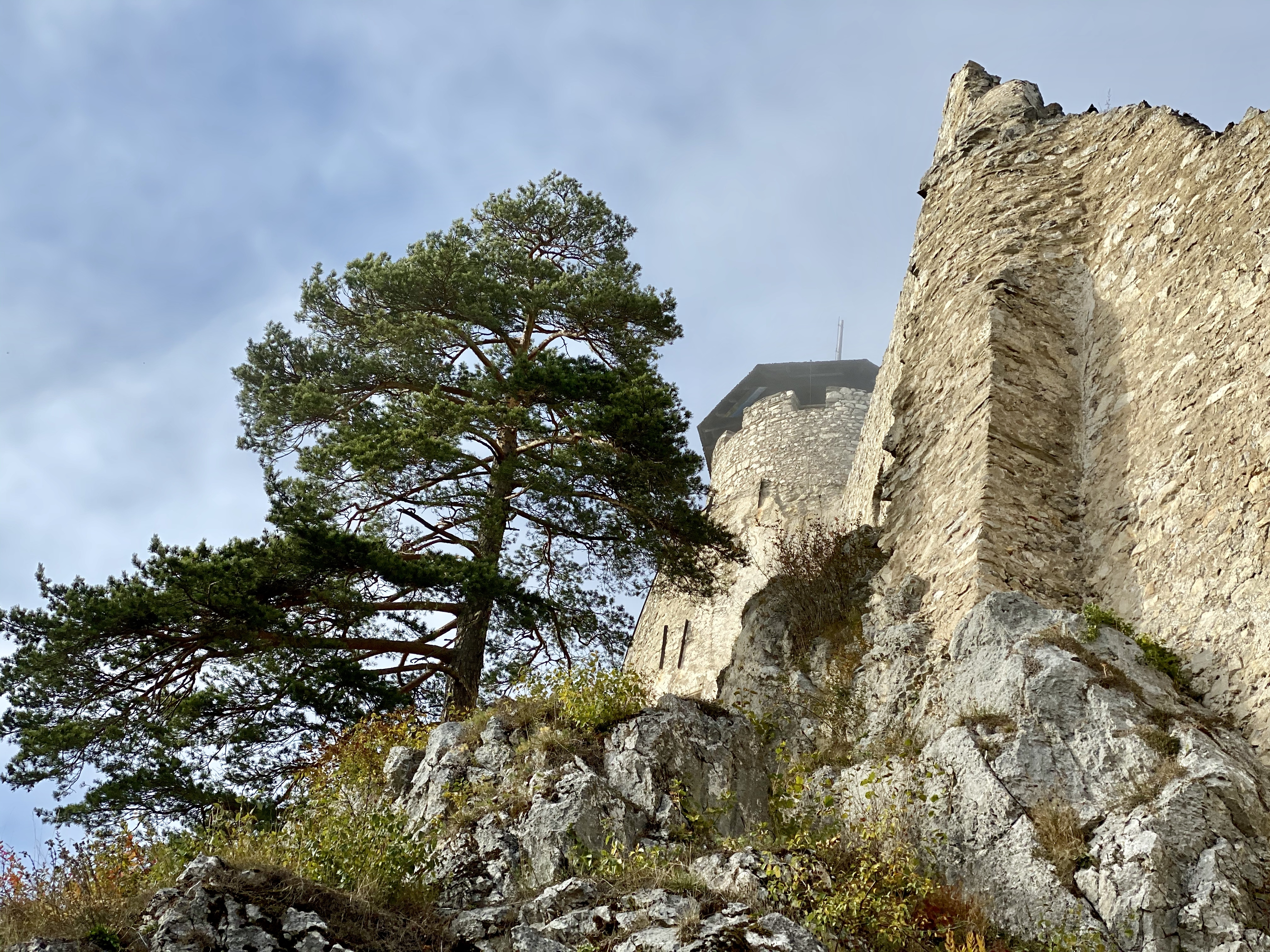
Araburg ruins

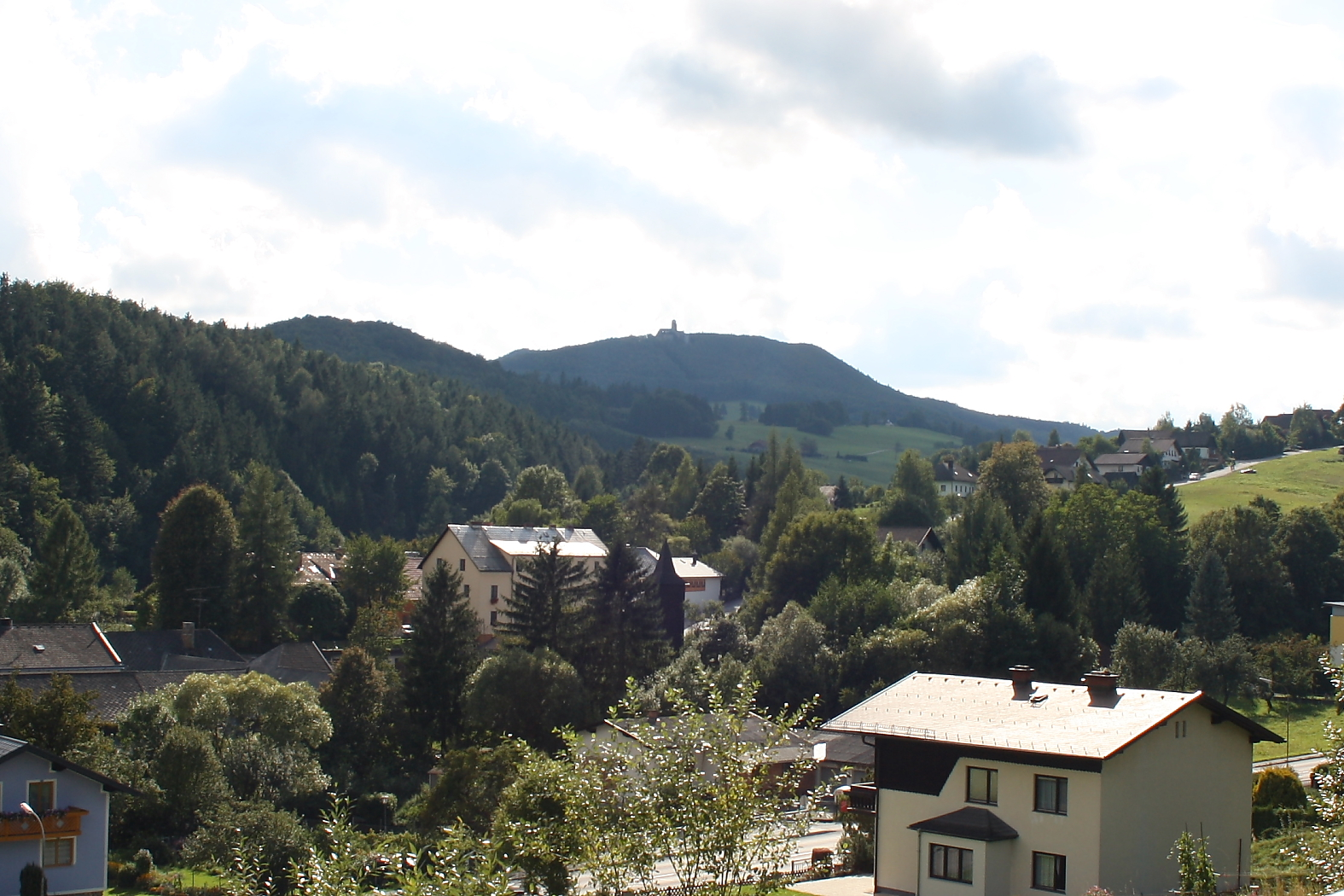
Burgruine Araburg on top of the hill seen from Kaumberg

== See also ==
- List of castles in Austria
