= Ramsau, Lower Austria =

Ramsau
- Municipality
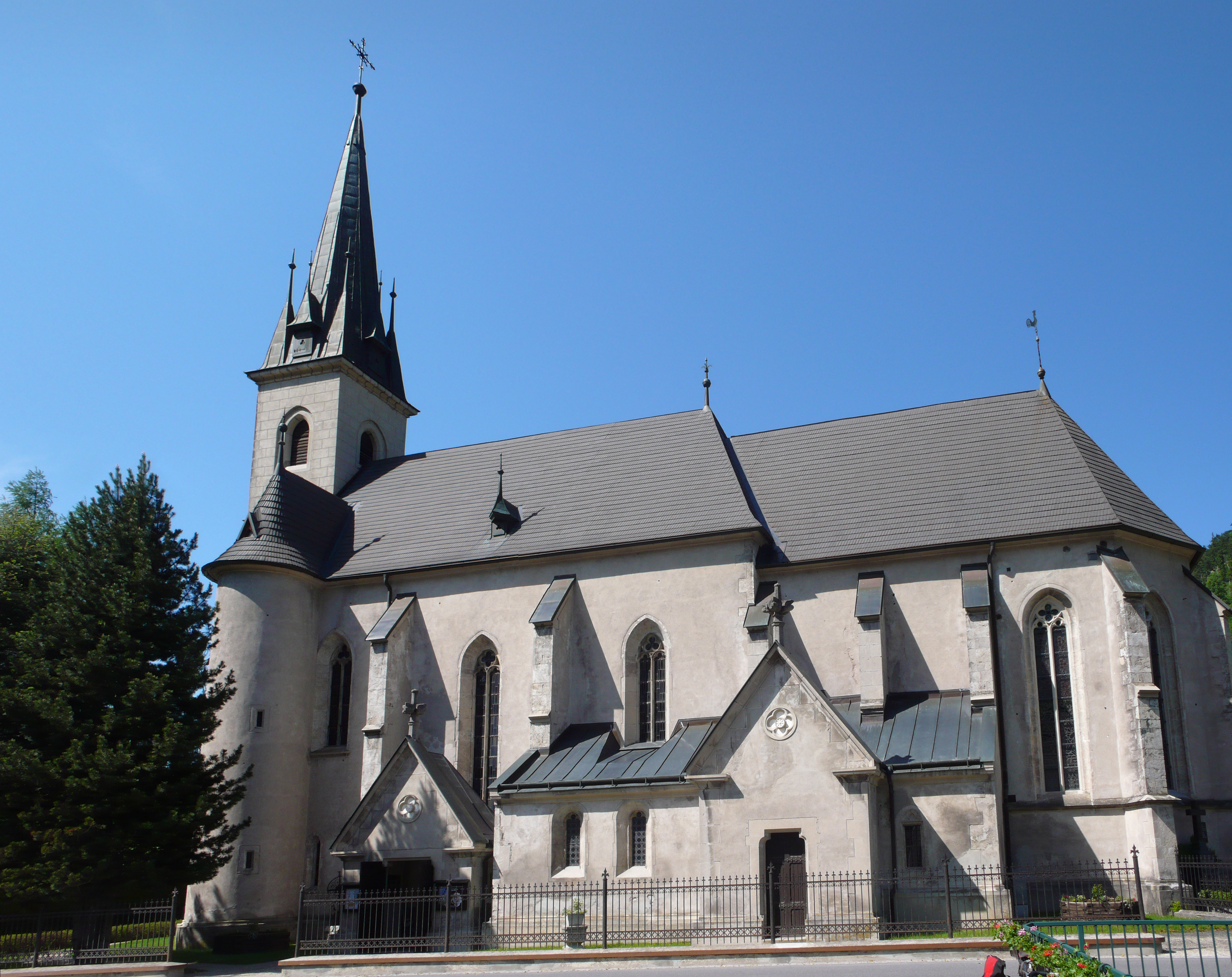
- Ramsau parish church

- Coat of arms

- Location within Austria
- Coordinates: 48°0′N 15°48′E
- Country: Austria
- State: Lower Austria
- District: Lilienfeld

Government
  - Mayor: Gertraud Steinacher (ÖVP)

Area
  - Total: 54.71 km^{2} (21.12 sq mi)
- Elevation: 470 m (1,540 ft)

Population (2018-01-01)
  - Total: 850
  - Density: 16/km^{2} (40/sq mi)
- Time zone: UTC+1 (CET)
  - Summer (DST): UTC+2 (CEST)
- Postal code: 3172
- Area code: 02764
- Website: www.ramsau.gv.at www.ramsau.cc

Ramsau is a town in the district of Lilienfeld in the Austrian state of Lower Austria.

== Population ==
Historical population
Year	Pop.	±%
1971	907	—
1981	847	−6.6%
1991	954	+12.6%
2001	934	−2.1%
2014	854	−8.6%
