= St. Aegyd am Neuwalde =

Sankt Aegyd am Neuwalde
- Municipality
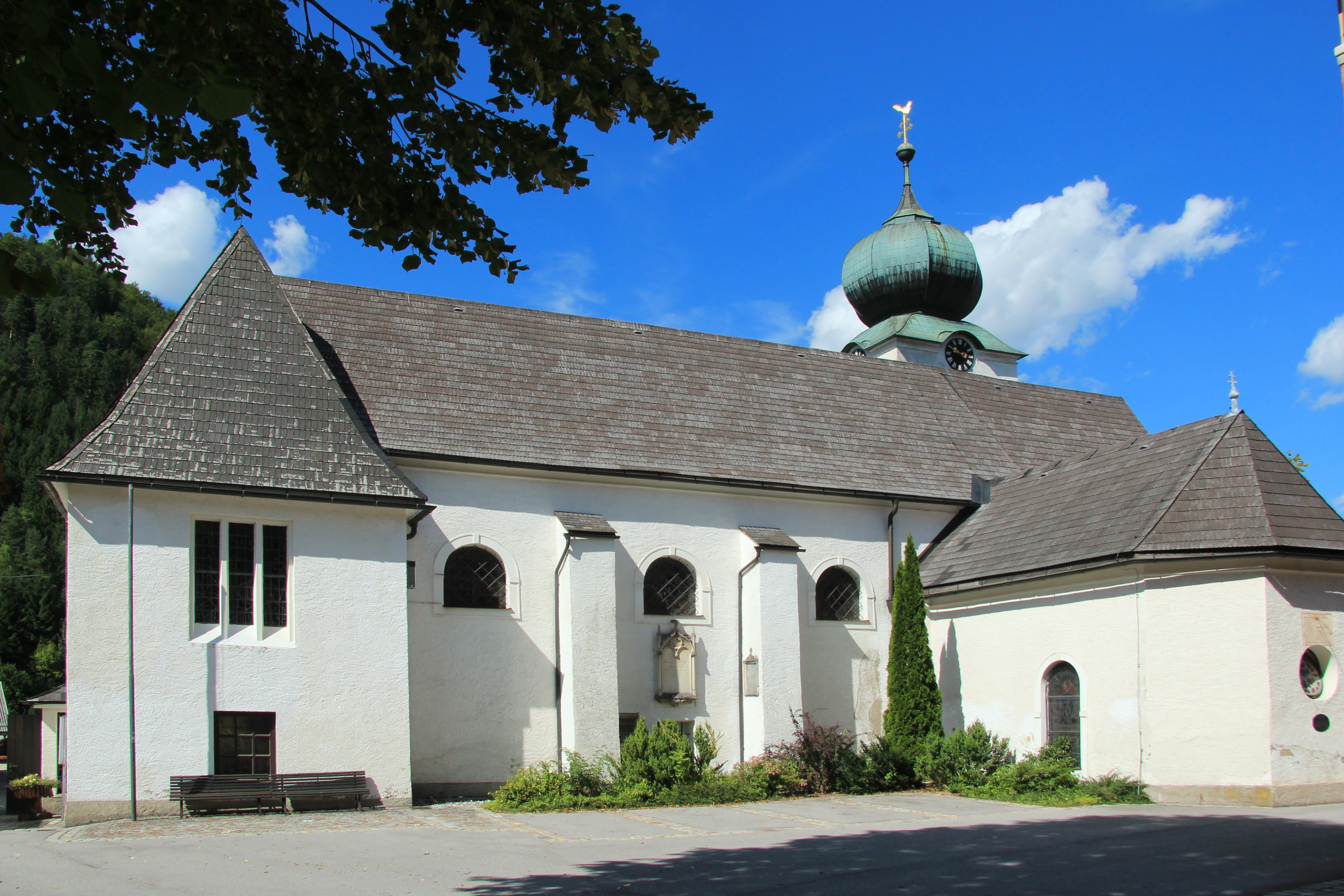
- Sankt Aegyd parish church

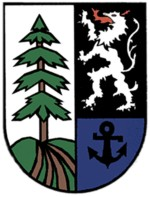
- Coat of arms

- Location within Austria
- Coordinates: 47°51′N 15°33′E
- Country: Austria
- State: Lower Austria
- District: Lilienfeld

Government
  - Mayor: Karl Oysmüller (SPÖ)

Area
  - Total: 184.64 km^{2} (71.29 sq mi)
- Elevation: 588 m (1,929 ft)

Population (2018-01-01)
  - Total: 1,901
  - Density: 10.30/km^{2} (26.67/sq mi)
- Time zone: UTC+1 (CET)
  - Summer (DST): UTC+2 (CEST)
- Postal code: 3193
- Area code: 02768
- Website: www.staegyd.at

Sankt Aegyd am Neuwalde is a market town in the district of Lilienfeld, Lower Austria.

== Geography ==
St. Aegyd is divided into the districts of Kernhof, Lahnsattel, Mitterbach, St. Aegyd am Neuwalde, and Ulreichsberg. The town is located in the Mostviertel. 87.61 percent of municipal territory is forested.

== History ==
In antiquity, the territory that is now St. Aegyd was part of the Roman province of Noricum. As part of the Austrian heartland of Lower Austria, St. Aegyd was part of the tumultuous history of Austria.

== Population ==
Historical population
Year	Pop.	±%
1971	3,188	—
1981	2,887	−9.4%
1991	2,518	−12.8%
2001	2,344	−6.9%
2011	2,057	−12.2%
2021	1,842	−10.5%
2025	1,791	−2.8%

== Politics ==
The municipal council (Gemeinderat) consists of 19 members. Since the 2025 local elections, it is made up of the following parties:

- Social Democratic Party of Austria (SPÖ): 13 seats
- Austrian People's Party (ÖVP): 6 seats
