= Eschenau =

- Municipality
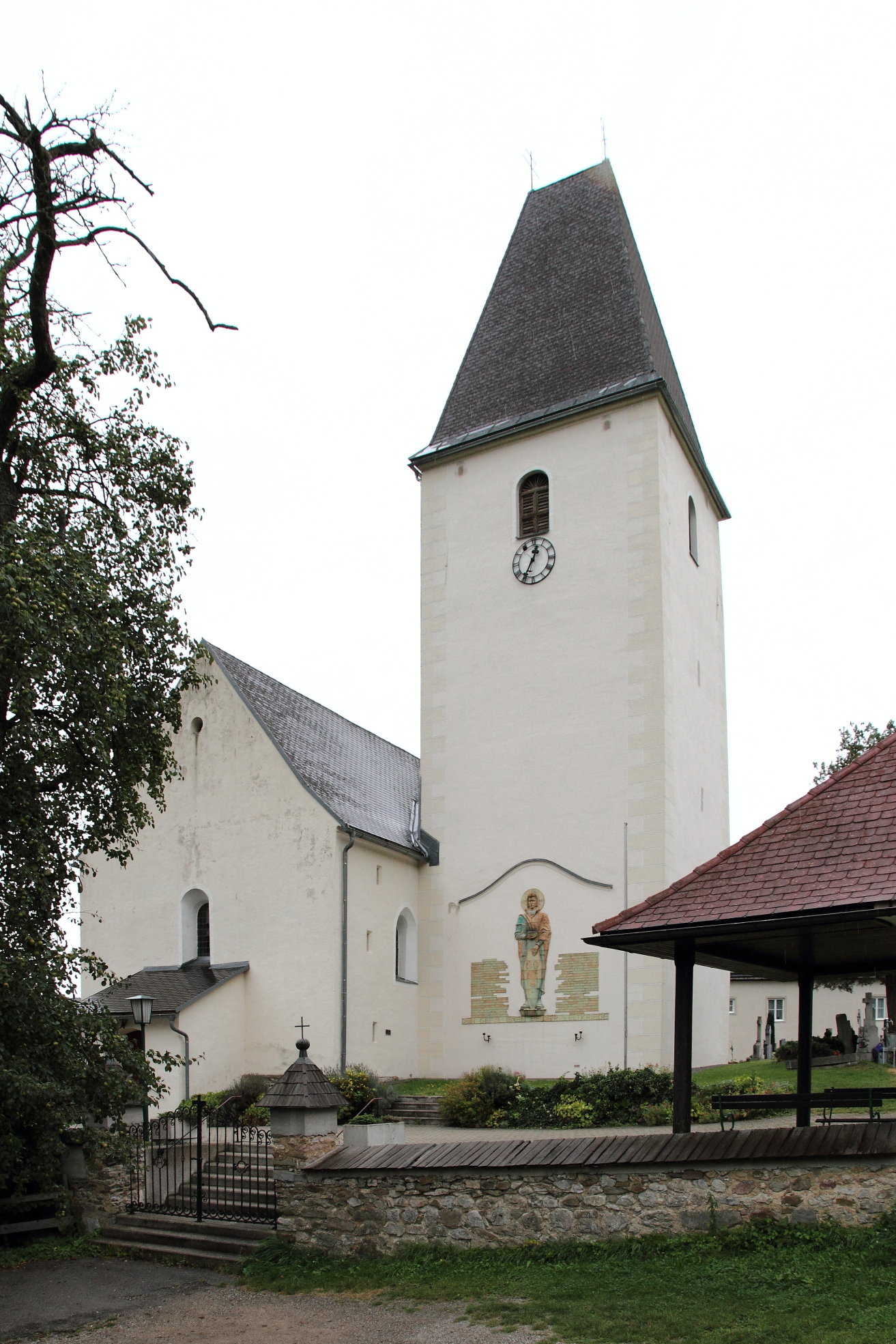
- Eschenau parish church

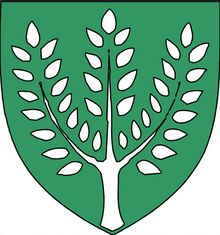
- Coat of arms

- Location within Austria
- Coordinates: 48°2′N 15°34′E
- Country: Austria
- State: Lower Austria
- District: Lilienfeld

Government
  - Mayor: Alois Kaiser (ÖVP)

Area
  - Total: 24.72 km^{2} (9.54 sq mi)
- Elevation: 406 m (1,332 ft)

Population (2026)
  - Total: 1,275
  - Density: 51.58/km^{2} (133.6/sq mi)
- Time zone: UTC+1 (CET)
  - Summer (DST): UTC+2 (CEST)
- Postal code: 3153
- Area code: 02762
- Website: www.eschenau.at

Eschenau is a municipality in the district of Lilienfeld in the Austrian state of Lower Austria.

== Demographics ==
Historical population
Year	Pop.	±%
1971	1,020	—
1981	1,024	+0.4%
1991	1,016	−0.8%
2001	1,162	+14.4%
2011	1,367	+17.6%
2021	1,310	−4.2%
2026	1,275	−2.7%
