= Hohenberg, Lower Austria =

Hohenberg
- Municipality
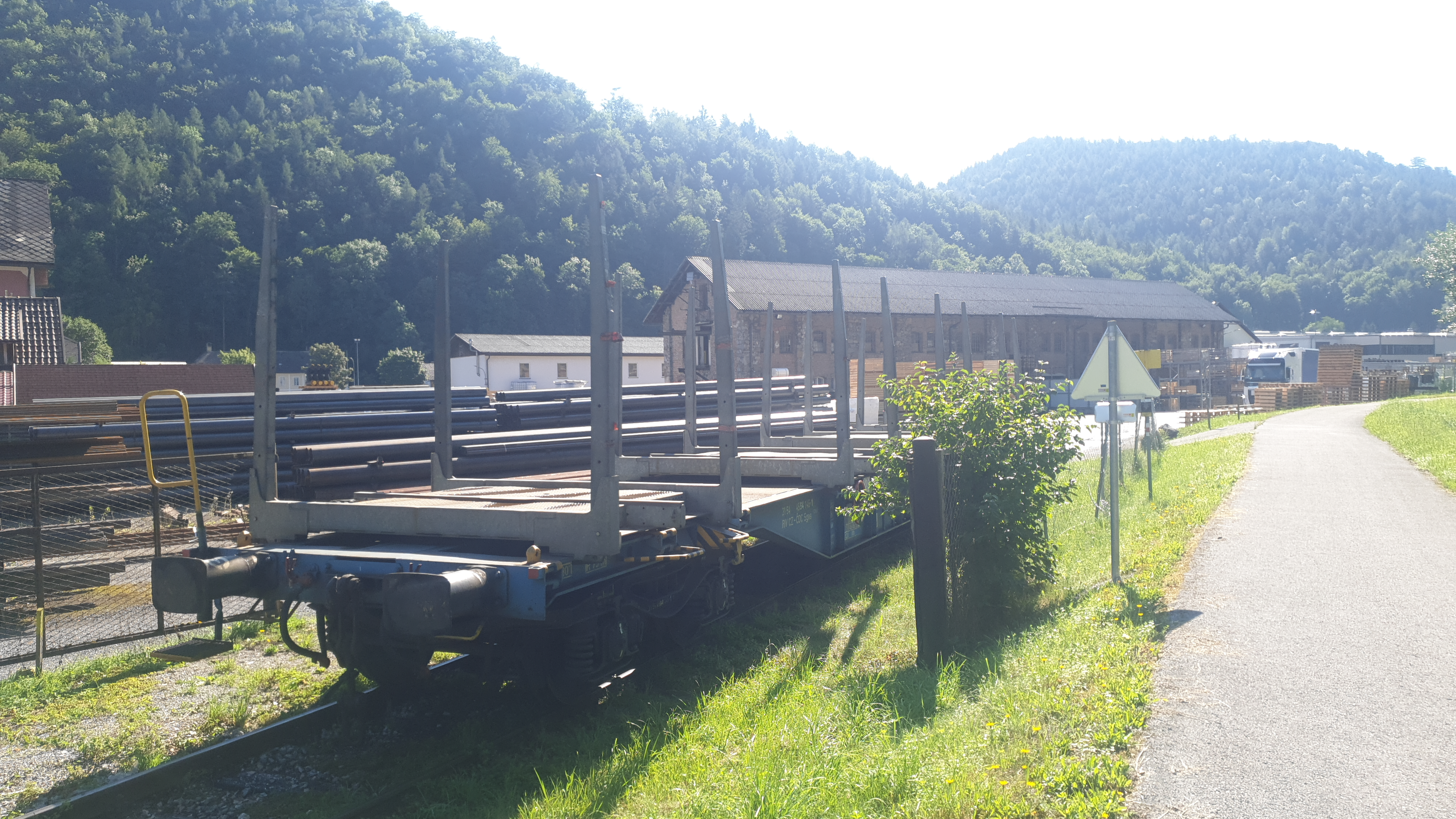

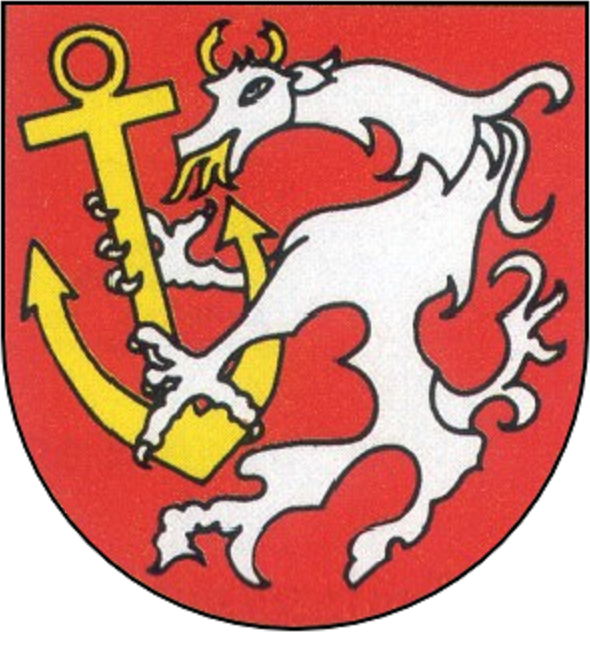
- Coat of arms

- Location within Austria
- Coordinates: 47°54′N 15°37′E
- Country: Austria
- State: Lower Austria
- District: Lilienfeld

Government
  - Mayor: Ferdinand Lerchbaumer (SPÖ)

Area
  - Total: 56.76 km^{2} (21.92 sq mi)
- Elevation: 488 m (1,601 ft)

Population (2016-01-01)
  - Total: 1,515
  - Density: 26.69/km^{2} (69.13/sq mi)
- Time zone: UTC+1 (CET)
  - Summer (DST): UTC+2 (CEST)
- Postal code: 3192
- Area code: 02767
- Website: www.hohenberg.gv.at

Hohenberg (Austrian German pronunciation: [ˈhoːənbɛrɡ]) is a town in the district of Lilienfeld in the Austrian state of Lower Austria.

== Population ==
Historical population
Year	Pop.	±%
1971	2,021	—
1981	1,881	−6.9%
1991	1,715	−8.8%
2001	1,638	−4.5%
2014	1,486	−9.3%
