= Kurt Krieger =

American baseball player (1926–1970)

- Pitcher
- Born: September 16, 1926; Traisen, Austria
- Died: August 16, 1970 (aged 43); St. Louis, Missouri, US
- Batted: Right Threw: Right

MLB debut
- April 21, 1949, for the St. Louis Cardinals

Last MLB appearance
- September 11, 1951, for the St. Louis Cardinals

MLB statistics
- Win–loss record: 0–0
- Earned run average: 12.60
- Strikeouts: 3
- Stats at Baseball Reference

Teams
- St. Louis Cardinals (1949–1951)

Kurt Ferdinand Krieger (September 16, 1926 – August 16, 1970), nicknamed "Dutch", was an American professional baseball pitcher who appeared in three Major League Baseball games for the St. Louis Cardinals during the seasons of 1949 and 1951. Born in the town of Traisen, Austria he was the first person born in post-1918 Austria, as of 2026, to play in the major leagues, although other MLB players were natives of the multiethnic 1867–1918 Austro-Hungarian Empire.

Krieger was listed as 6 feet 3 inches (1.91 m) tall and 212 pounds (96 kg). A graduate and athlete from Washington University in St. Louis, he entered pro baseball in the low minors at age 17 in 1944, then served in the United States Army during World War II, and missed the 1945 and 1946 seasons.

When he resumed his baseball career in 1947, Krieger won 16 games for the Lynchburg Cardinals of the Class B Piedmont League. By 1949, he had worked his way onto the 28-man, early-season roster of the MLB Cardinals. In his April 21 debut, he was called on in the ninth inning to finish a game at Crosley Field in which the Cardinals trailed the Cincinnati Reds 5–0. Although Krieger walked Grady Hatton, the first hitter he faced, then threw a wild pitch, he retired the next three men and held Cincinnati off the scoreboard.

After that contest, Krieger was returned to the minors, where he posted a stellar 17–5 won–lost record at Triple-A Rochester in 1950. But when he returned to the Cardinals in 1951, he was treated harshly by the Chicago Cubs and New York Giants in his final two MLB appearances. In the majors, he worked in three games, all in relief; he did not earn a decision or a save, and ultimately allowed six hits, five bases on balls, and seven earned runs in five innings pitched, with three strikeouts and an earned run average of 12.60. His minor league career continued into 1954.

Kurt Krieger died in St. Louis on August 16, 1970, at age 43, and was interred in Affton, Missouri, in Sunset Memorial Park.
