= Türnitz =

- Municipality
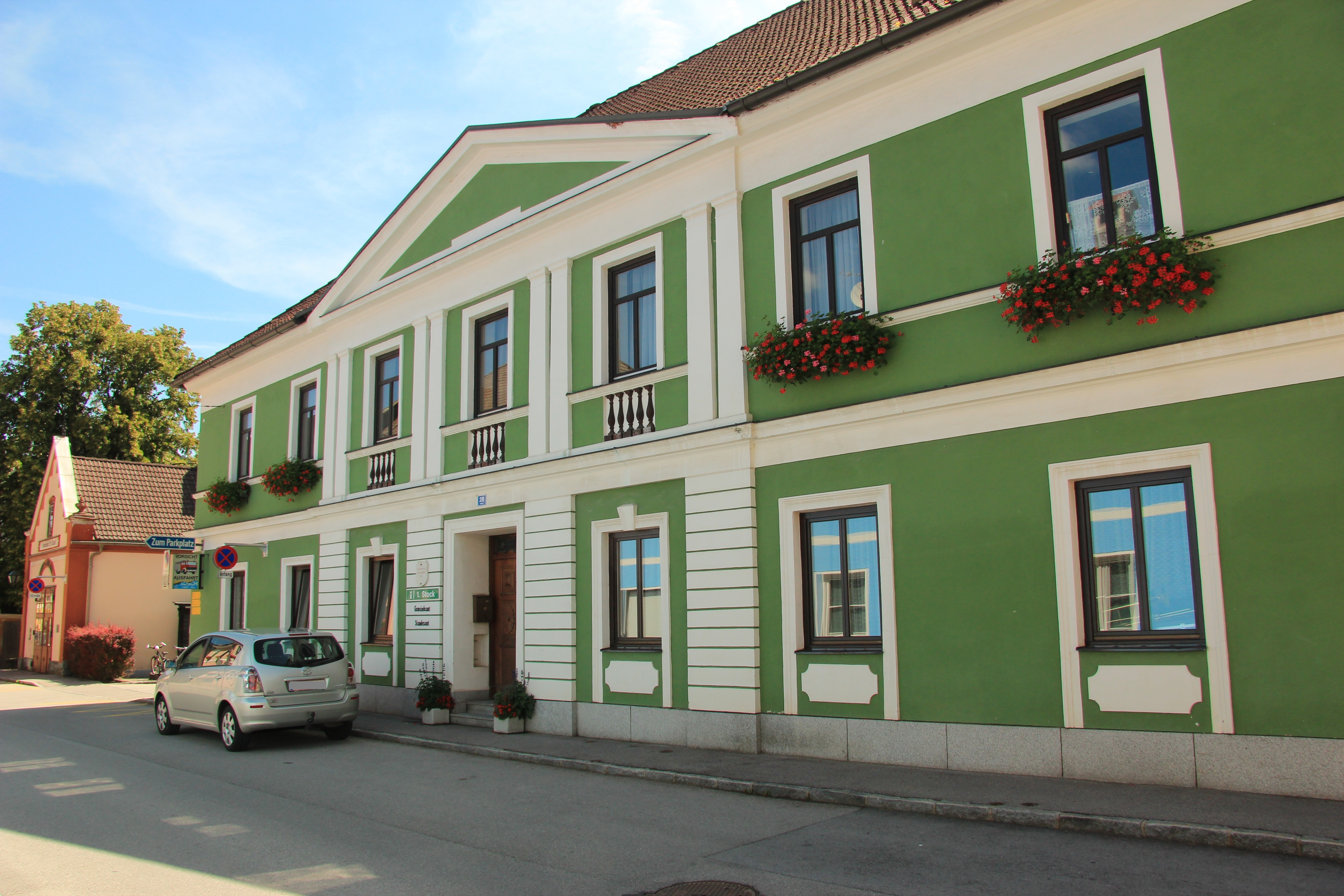
- Türnitz town hall

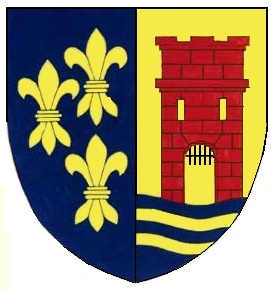
- Coat of arms

- Location within Austria
- Coordinates: 47°56′N 15°29′E
- Country: Austria
- State: Lower Austria
- District: Lilienfeld

Government
  - Mayor: Christian Leeb

Area
  - Total: 145.52 km^{2} (56.19 sq mi)
- Elevation: 466 m (1,529 ft)

Population (2018-01-01)
  - Total: 1,912
  - Density: 13.14/km^{2} (34.03/sq mi)
- Time zone: UTC+1 (CET)
  - Summer (DST): UTC+2 (CEST)
- Postal code: 3184
- Area code: 02769
- Website: www.tuernitz-noe.at

Türnitz is a town in the district of Lilienfeld in the Austrian state of Lower Austria.

== Population ==
Historical population
Year	Pop.	±%
1971	2,309	—
1981	2,171	−6.0%
1991	2,170	−0.0%
2001	2,050	−5.5%
2014	1,883	−8.1%

== Climate ==
Mean annual temperature is 8.2 degree Celsius; annual precipitation is 1108.8 mm. Rainfall is at its highest in August at 136.6 mm, at its lowest in April at 59.4 mm. It is warmest in July, coolest in January.
