= Kaumberg =

- Municipality
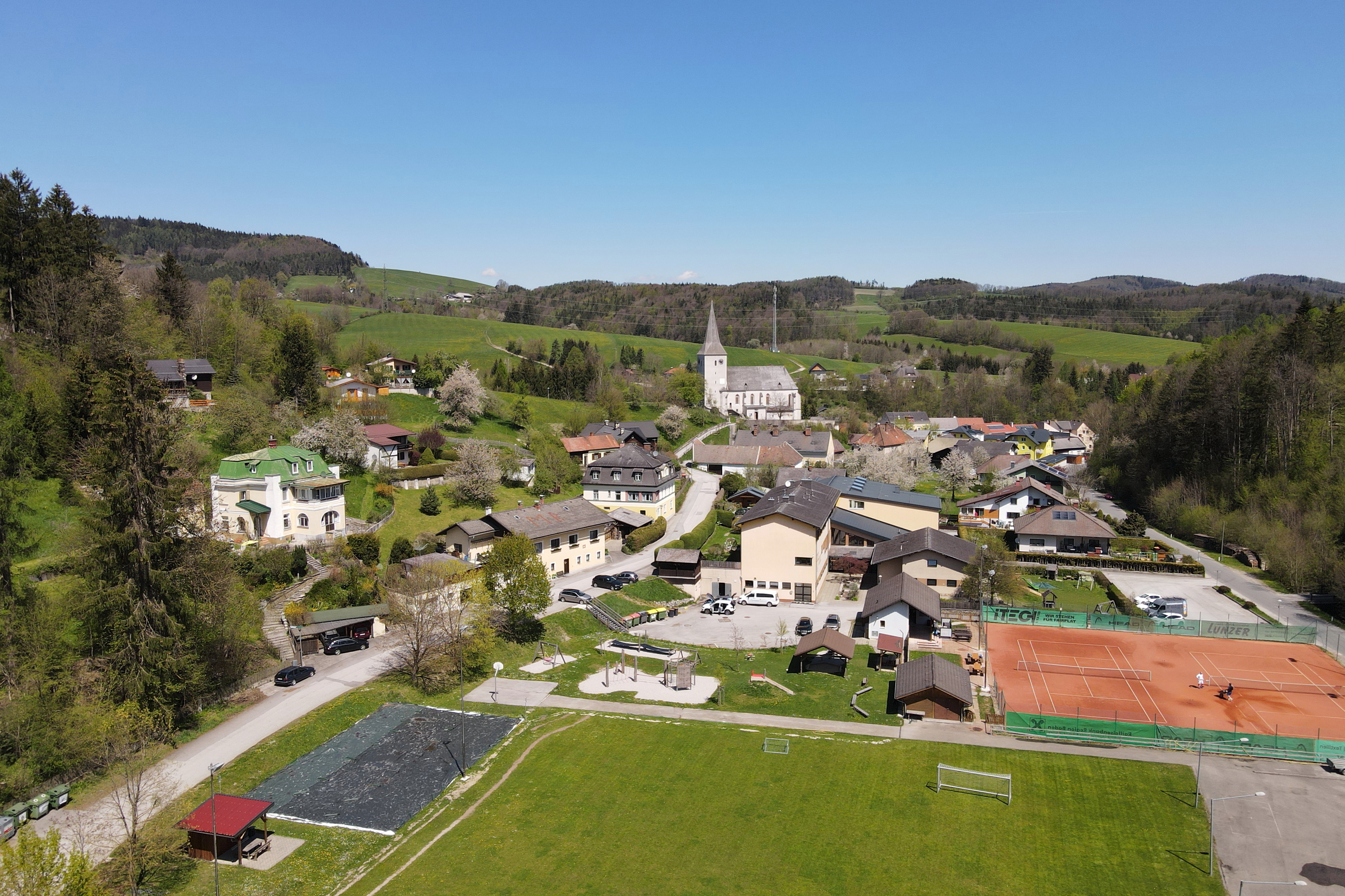

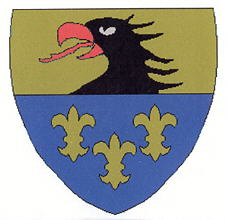
- Coat of arms

- Location within Austria
- Coordinates: 48°1′N 15°34′E
- Country: Austria
- State: Lower Austria
- District: Lilienfeld

Government
  - Mayor: Michael Wurmetzberger (ÖVP)

Area
  - Total: 43.01 km^{2} (16.61 sq mi)
- Elevation: 494 m (1,621 ft)

Population (2018-01-01)
  - Total: 1,016
  - Density: 23.62/km^{2} (61.18/sq mi)
- Time zone: UTC+1 (CET)
  - Summer (DST): UTC+2 (CEST)
- Postal code: 2572
- Area code: 02766
- Website: www.kaumberg.at

Kaumberg is a town in the district of Lilienfeld in the Austrian state of Lower Austria.

== Population ==
Historical population
Year	Pop.	±%
1971	829	—
1981	869	+4.8%
1991	942	+8.4%
2001	1,049	+11.4%
2014	989	−5.7%
