= Lilienfeld District =

Coordinates: 48.013°N 15.609°E

Lilienfeld District Bezirk Lilienfeld
- District
- Country: Austria
- State: Lower Austria
- Number of municipalities: 14
- Administrative seat: Lilienfeld

Government
  - District Governor: Heidelinde Grubhofer (since 2023)

Area
  - Total: 931.6 km^{2} (359.7 sq mi)

Population (2024)
  - Total: 25,380
  - Density: 27.24/km^{2} (70.56/sq mi)
- Time zone: UTC+01:00 (CET)
  - Summer (DST): UTC+02:00 (CEST)
- Vehicle registration: LF
- NUTS code: AT121
- District code: 314

Bezirk Lilienfeld is a district of the state of Lower Austria in Austria.

== Municipalities ==
- Annaberg
  - Annarotte, Haupttürnitzrotte, Langseitenrotte, Lassingrotte
- Eschenau
  - Eschenau, Laimergraben, Rotheau, Sonnleitgraben, Steubach, Wehrabach
- Hainfeld
  - Bernau, Gegend Egg, Gerichtsberg, Gerstbach, Gölsen, Gstettl, Hainfeld, Heugraben, Kasberg, Kaufmannberg, Landstal, Ob der Kirche, Vollberg
- Hohenberg
  - Andersbach, Furthof, Hofamt, Hohenberg, Innerfahrafeld
- Kaumberg
  - Höfnergraben, Kaumberg, Laabach, Obertriesting, Steinbachtal, Untertriesting
- Kleinzell
  - Außerhalbach, Ebenwald, Innerhalbach, Kleinzell
- Lilienfeld
  - Dörfl, Hintereben, Jungherrntal, Lilienfeld, Marktl, Schrambach, Stangental, Vordereben, Zögersbach
- Mitterbach am Erlaufsee
  - Josefsrotte, Mitterbach-Seerotte
- Ramsau
  - Fahrabach, Gaupmannsgraben, Haraseck, Kieneck, Oberhöhe, Oberried, Ramsau, Schneidbach, Unterried
- Rohrbach an der Gölsen
  - Bernreit, Durlaß, Oberrohrbach, Prünst, Unterrohrbach
- Sankt Aegyd am Neuwalde
  - Kernhof, Lahnsattel, Mitterbach, St. Aegyd am Neuwalde, Ulreichsberg
- Sankt Veit an der Gölsen
  - Außer-Wiesenbach, Inner-Wiesenbach, Kerschenbach, Kropfsdorf, Maierhöfen, Obergegend, Pfenningbach, Rainfeld, Schwarzenbach an der Gölsen, St. Veit an der Gölsen, Steinwandleiten, Traisenort, Wiesenfeld, Wobach
- Traisen
- Türnitz
  - Anthofrotte, Außerfahrafeld, Lehenrotte, Moosbach, Pichlrotte, Raxenbachrotte, Schildbachrotte, Steinbachrotte, Traisenbachrotte, Türnitz, Weidenaurotte
