= Traisen, Austria =

Traisen
- Municipality
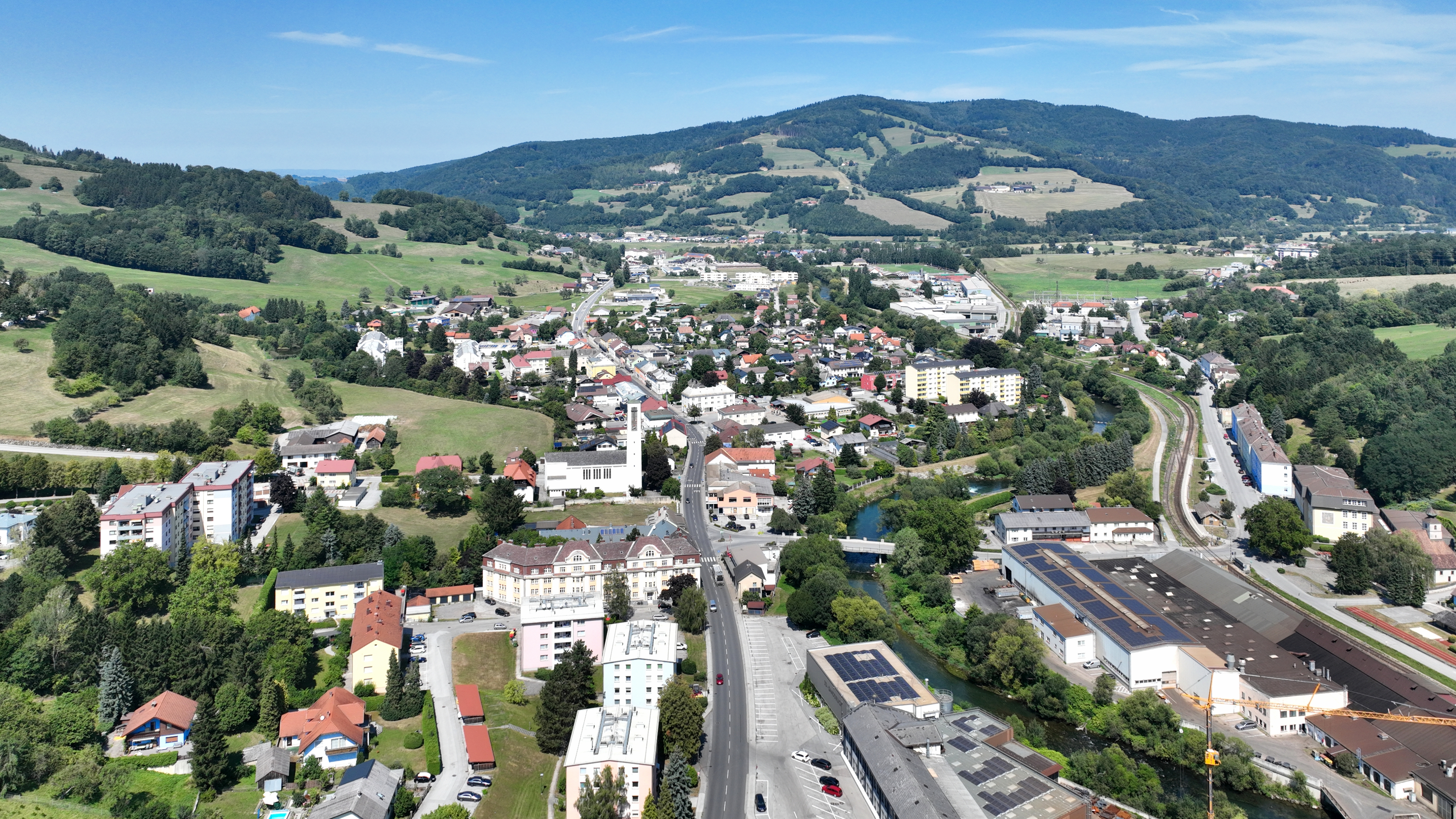
- South view of Traisen

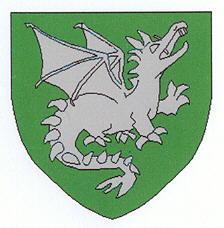
- Coat of arms

- Location within Austria
- Coordinates: 48°3′N 15°37′E
- Country: Austria
- State: Lower Austria
- District: Lilienfeld

Government
  - Mayor: Herbert Thompser, Jun.

Area
  - Total: 6.8 km^{2} (2.6 sq mi)
- Elevation: 356 m (1,168 ft)

Population (2018-01-01)
  - Total: 3,453
  - Density: 510/km^{2} (1,300/sq mi)
- Time zone: UTC+1 (CET)
  - Summer (DST): UTC+2 (CEST)
- Postal code: 3160
- Area code: 02762
- Website: www.traisen.gv.at

Traisen (German pronunciation: [ˈtʀaɪ̯zn̩], pronunciation in local German dialect [ˈtʀoːazn̩]) is a town in the district of Lilienfeld in the Austrian state of Lower Austria.

== Population ==
Historical population
Year	Pop.	±%
1971	3,541	—
1981	3,573	+0.9%
1991	3,643	+2.0%
2001	3,649	+0.2%
2009	3,704	+1.5%
2014	3,513	−5.2%

== Personalities ==
- Rupert Hollaus (1931–1954) was an Austrian Grand Prix motorcycle road racer who competed for the NSU factory racing team. He is the only Austrian to win a road racing World Championship.
- Kurt Krieger (1926–1970), nicknamed "Dutch", was a Major League Baseball player who played pitcher from 1949 to 1951.
