= Mitterbach am Erlaufsee =

- Municipality
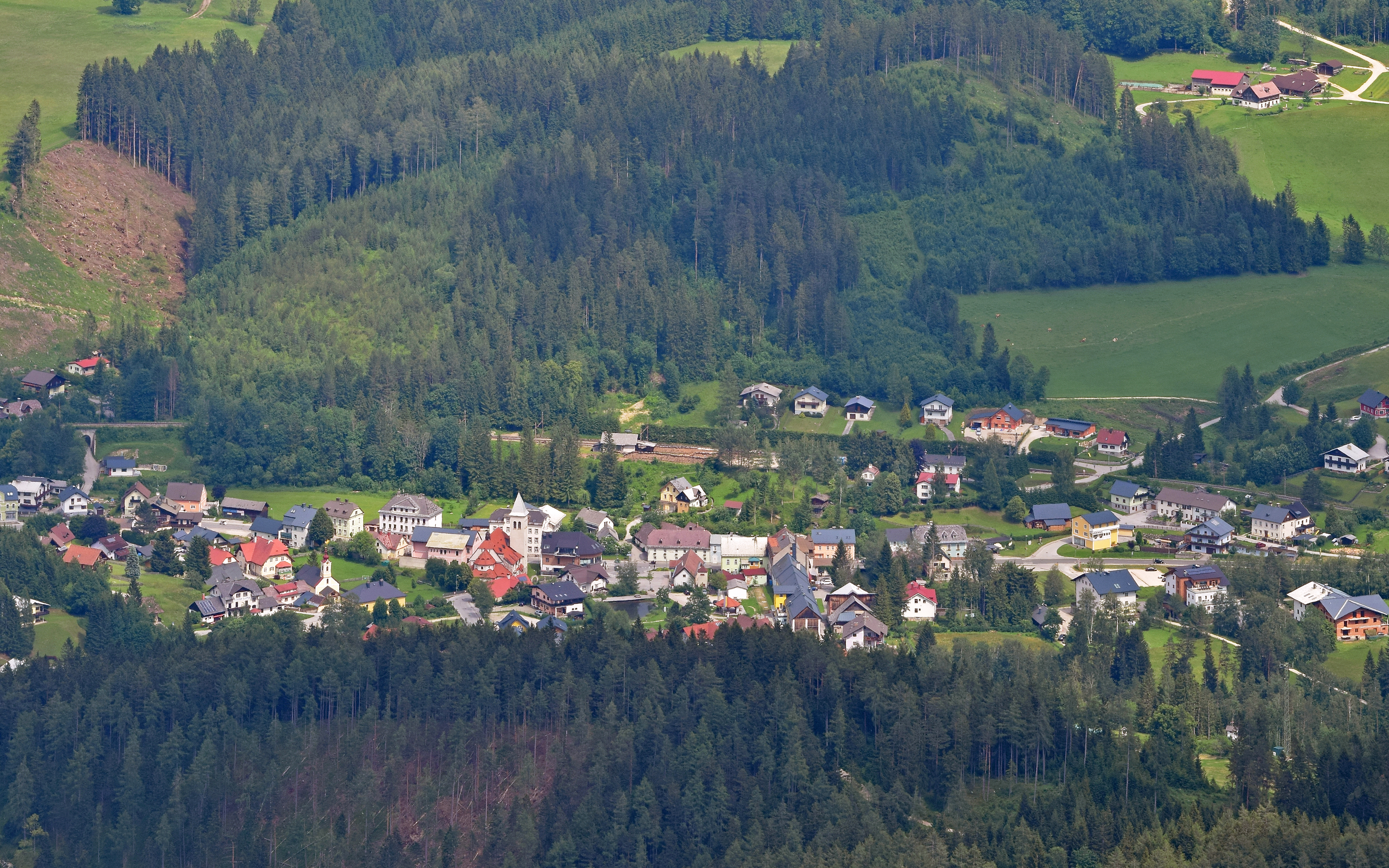
- Aerial view

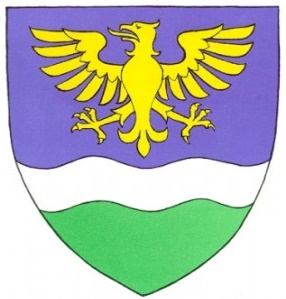
- Coat of arms

- Location within Austria
- Coordinates: 47°48′50″N 15°17′42″E
- Country: Austria
- State: Lower Austria
- District: Lilienfeld

Government
  - Mayor: Alfred Hinterecker

Area
  - Total: 67.32 km^{2} (25.99 sq mi)
- Elevation: 789 m (2,589 ft)

Population (2018-01-01)
  - Total: 499
  - Density: 7.41/km^{2} (19.2/sq mi)
- Time zone: UTC+1 (CET)
  - Summer (DST): UTC+2 (CEST)
- Postal code: 3224
- Area code: 03882
- Website: www.mitterbach.at

Mitterbach am Erlaufsee is a municipality in the district of Lilienfeld in the Austrian state of Lower Austria.

== Demographics ==
Historical population
Year	Pop.	±%
1971	768	—
1981	689	−10.3%
1991	667	−3.2%
2001	615	−7.8%
2011	570	−7.3%
2021	479	−16.0%
2026	458	−4.4%
