= Mostviertel =

Subdivision of the region of Lower Austria

Coordinates: 48.0000°N 15.3333°E

Mostviertel (German: [ˈmɔstˌfɪʁtl̩]; English: 'Most Quarter') is the southwestern quarter of the four quarters of Lower Austria (the northeast state of the 9 states in Austria). It is bordered on the north by the Danube and to the south and west by the state borders of Styria and Upper Austria respectively. The Wienerwald forms the natural border to the east and gives the quarter its second name, "The Quarter over the Wienerwald".

The name Mostviertel comes from the term Most, which refers to the perry and cider made in the region. The lands between the Rivers Ybbs and Enns enjoy favorable conditions for growing fruit trees and are therefore the heart of a flourishing Most industry. The Perry tree blossom in April is a regular highlight of the region. Typical in the Mostviertel are vast meadows of mixed orchards surrounding a farmhouse, in the center of which is usually a square courtyard, and the lightly rolling foothills of the Alps.

== Business and Industry ==
=== Economy ===
The economy of Mostviertel is still mainly based on iron and steel as well as forestry. In earlier times, when iron ore was still mined at Erzberg, the work was done in hammer mills; today the steel mills take the half-finished product from the blast furnaces of Linz and Donawitz and turn it into blades for machines. In the Mostviertel, there is one large sawmill, plus many smaller ones, which process the wood taken from the forests. However, most of the economy is made up of small and mid-sized companies.

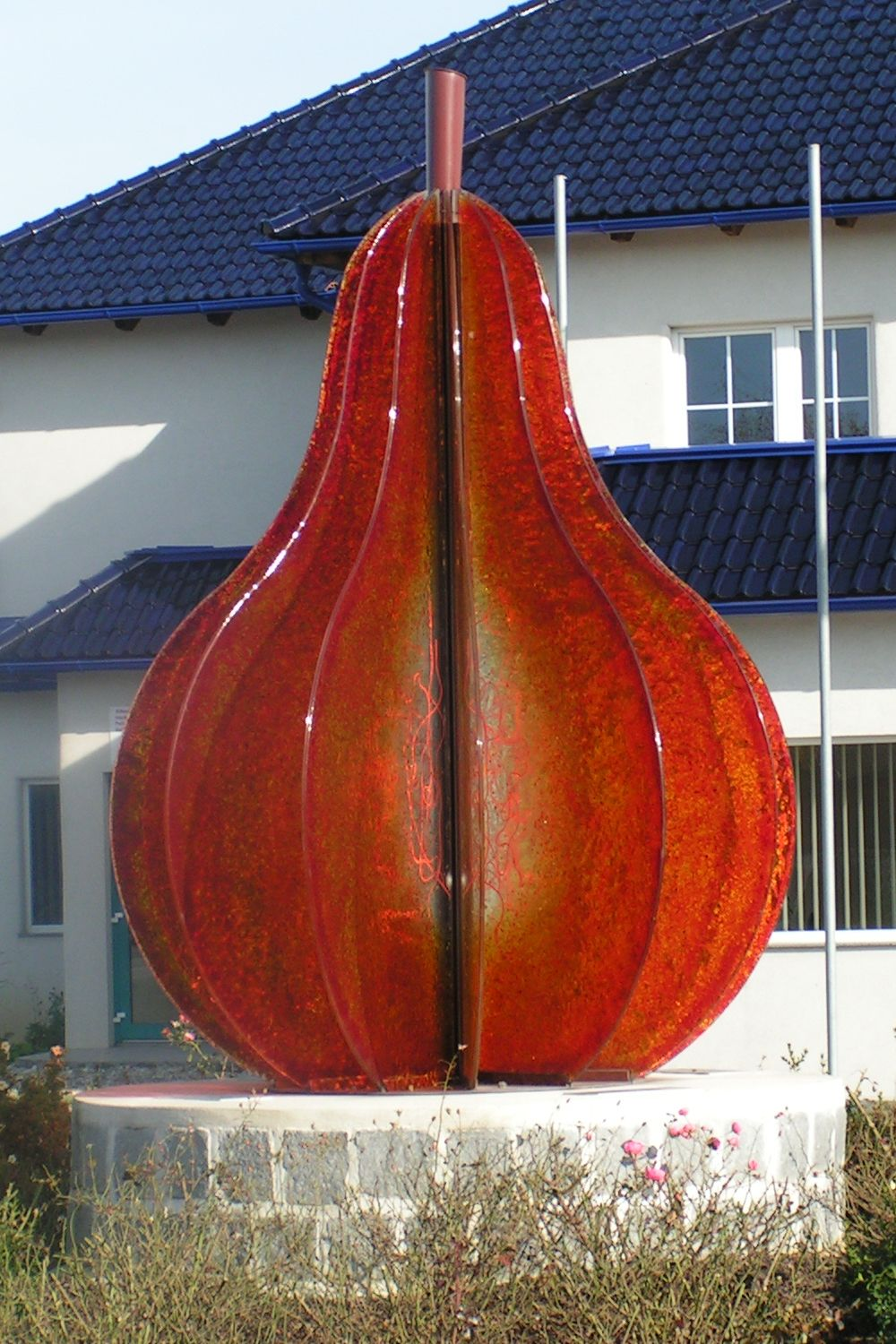
The Mostbirne (Cider Pear), a symbol of the Mostviertel

=== Most ===
In the Mostviertel region, Most (a type of perry or cider) is considered to be of great cultural importance and is seen as an identifying characteristic of the region. Most is frequently consumed in Mostheurigen together with local foods and pastries, and it is also made into schnaps. There is a large variety of Mosts, including those made from pears (the most common variety, a kind of perry), from apples (a kind of Apfelwein or cider), and from a mixture of apples and pears. While the term Most can also be used to refer to grape must, in the Mostviertel region it refers to the local perry and cider.

== Geography ==
The Mostviertel is made up of the following districts:

- Amstetten
- Waidhofen an der Ybbs
- Scheibbs
- Melk south of the Danube
- Lilienfeld
- Tulln south of the Danube
- The City of St. Pölten and Sankt Pölten-Land
