= Pannonian Limes =

Roman fortified frontier

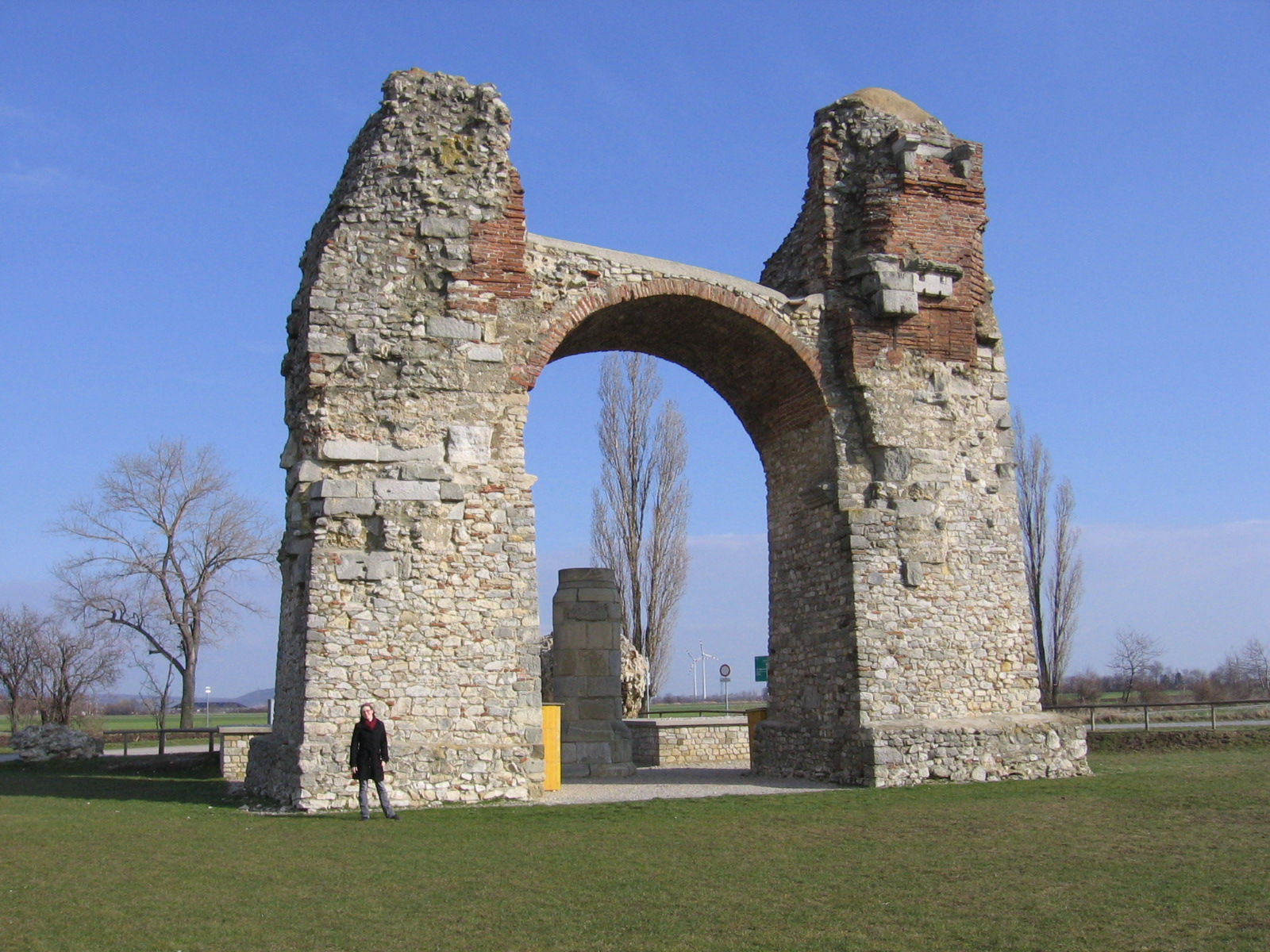
The Heidentor, originally built in the Roman fort-city of Carnuntum in present-day Austria.

The Pannonian Limes (Latin: Limes Pannonicus; German: Pannonischer Limes) is part of the old Roman fortified frontier known as the Danubian Limes that runs for approximately 420 km (260 mi) from the Roman camp of Klosterneuburg in the Vienna Basin in Austria to the castrum in Singidunum (Belgrade) in present-day Serbia. The garrisons of these camps protected the Pannonian provinces against attacks from the north from the time of Augustus (31 BC–14 AD) to the beginning of the 5th century. In places this section of the Roman limes also crossed the river into the territory of the barbarians (Barbaricum).

== Geography ==
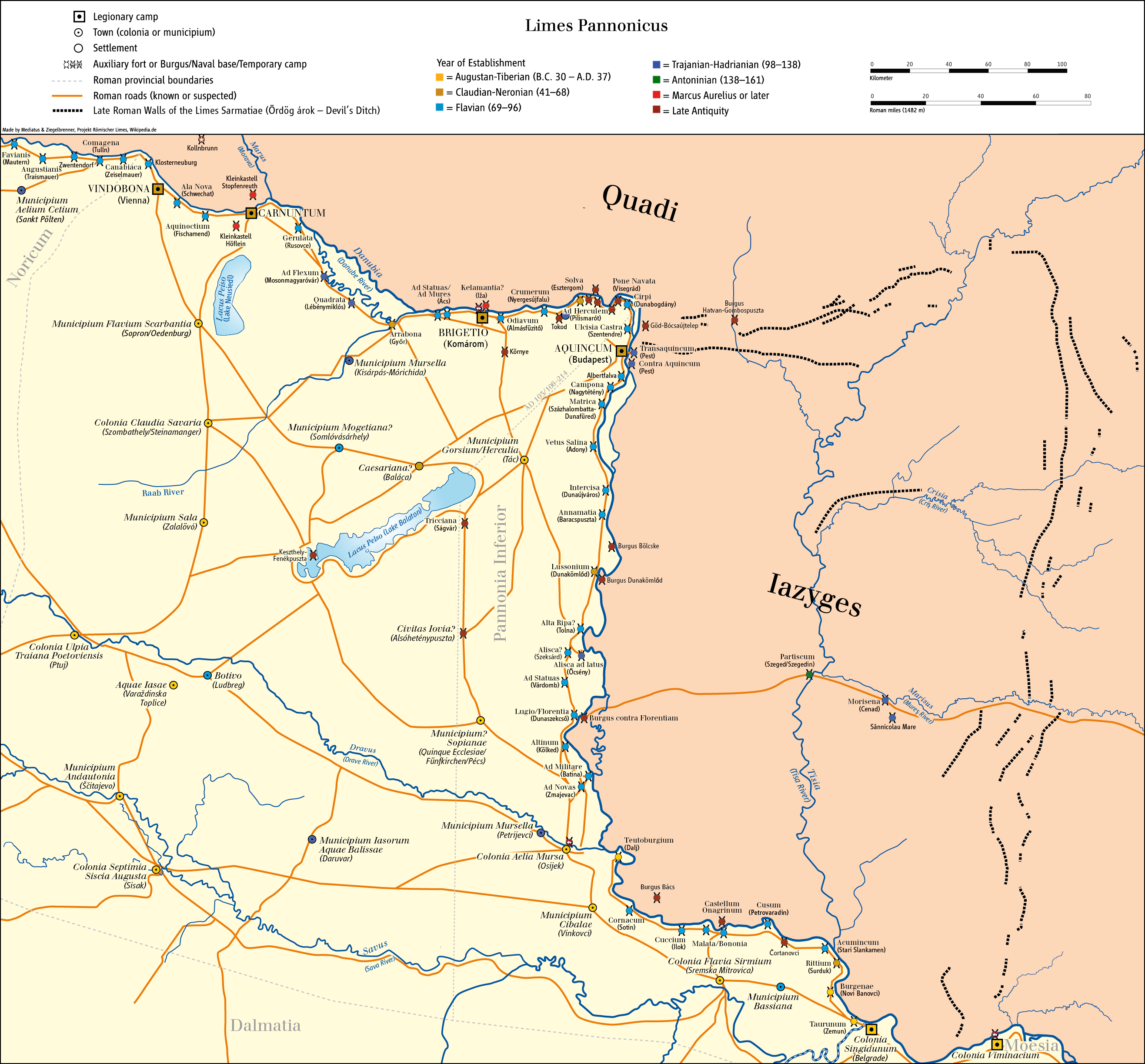
The limes in Pannonia

During the Roman Empire, the Pannonian region was divided into Pannonia Superior, or Upper Pannonia, to the west and Pannonia Inferior or Lower Pannonia to the east. Pannonia Superior consists mainly of present-day states of Austria, Croatia, Hungary, Slovakia, and Slovenia, while Pannonia Inferior consists of present-day states of Hungary, Croatia, Serbia, and Bosnia and Herzegovina.

== History ==
The Danubian limes was one of the most turbulent regions in the European part of the Roman Empire and, during more than 400 years of Roman rule, Pannonia was one of its most important provinces, especially after the abandonment of Dacia Traiana in 271 AD, because from that point on, the pressure of migrating peoples on this section of the limes increased still further. The limes also had a great influence on the economic and cultural life of the civilian population because its hinterland was one of the main supply areas for the border troops and these in turn were the guarantors of the rapid Romanisation of the province.

The majority of the occupying forces were stationed in camps (castra), small forts (castella), watchtowers, burgi and fortified bridgeheads that were built at regular intervals along the riverbank. In an emergency, these units were reinforced by the legions which had their headquarters in four major military garrison towns. With its advance to the Danube, the Roman Empire became engaged in a long series of conflicts with trans-Danubian Germanic and Sarmatian barbarian and migrant peoples, that finally ended in the 5th century with the collapse of the Empire in the west.

Pannonia's border changes and the locations of legion camps, deduction colonies and the Amber Road between the 1st and 4th centuries

== See also ==
- Fort Ala Nova
- Pannonia
- Borders of the Roman Empire

== Literature ==
- Jenő Fitz (ed.): Der Römische Limes in Ungarn [The Roman Limes in Hungary]. Fejér Megyei Múzeumok Igazgatósága, 1976.
- Kurt Genser: Der österreichische Donaulimes in der Römerzeit. Ein Forschungsbericht [The Austrian Danube Limes in Roman times. A research report]. Verlag der Österreichischen Akademie der Wissenschaften, Vienna, 1986, ISBN 3-7001-0783-8 (Der römische Limes in Österreich 33).
- Kurt Genser: Der österreichische Limes in der Römerzeit. Ein Forschungsbericht [The Austrian Danube Limes in Roman times. A research report]. (dissertation) Salzburg 1982, Teil II.
- Manfred Kandler, Hermann Vetters (ed.): Der römische Limes in Österreich [The Roman Limes in Austria]. Vienna, 1989.
- Sándor Soproni: Die letzten Jahrzehnte des pannonischen Limes [The last decades of the Pannonian Limes]. C. H. Beck, Munich, 1985, ISBN 3-406-30453-2.
- Sándor Soproni: Der spätrömische Limes zwischen Esztergom und Szentendre [The Late Roman Limes between Esztergom and Szentendre]. Akademiai Kiado, Budapest, 1978, ISBN 963-05-1307-2.
- Stillwell, Richard; MacDonald, William L.; McAllister, Marian Holland, eds. (1976). "Limes Pannoniae". The Princeton Encyclopedia of Classical Sites. Princeton University Press.
- Sándor Soproni: Militär und Befestigungen am Pannonischen Limes [Military and Fortifications on the Pannonian Limes]. Ed. Amt der NÖ Landesregierung, Abt. III/2, Catalogue of the Lower Austrian State Museum, New Issue No. 55, Die Römer an der Donau, Noricum und Pannonien, Vienna, 1973, pp 59–68.
- Endre Tóth: Die spätrömische Militärarchitektur in Transdanubien [Late Roman Military Architecture in Transdanubia]. In Archaeologiai Értesitő. 134, Budapest 2009.
- Zsolt Visy (ed.): The Roman Army in Pannonia. An Archaeological Guide of the Ripa Pannonica. Teleki László Foundation, Budapest, 2003. ISBN 963-86388-2-6.
- Zsolt Visy: The ripa Pannonica in Hungary. Akadémiai Kiadó, Budapest, 2003, ISBN 963-05-7980-4.
- Zsolt Visy, Endre Tóth, Dénes Gabler, Lazlo Kocsis, Peter Kovacs, Zsolt Mráv, Mihaly Nagy u. a.: Von Augustus bis Attila – Leben am ungarischen Donaulimes [From Augustus to Attila. Life at the Hungarian Danube Limes]. Konrad Theiss Verlag, Stuttgart, 2000, ISBN 3-8062-1541-3 (Schriften des Limesmuseums Aalen 53).
- Zsolt Visy: Der pannonische Limes in Ungarn [The Pannonian Limes in Hungary]. Konrad Theiss Verlag, Stuttgart, 1988, ISBN 3-8062-0488-8.
- Herma Stiglitz: Militär und Befestigungen am Österreichischen Limes [Military and Fortifications on the Austrian Limes]. Ed. Office of the Lower Austrian State Government, Dept. III/2, Catalogue of the Lower Austrian State Museum, New Series No. 55, Die Römer an der Donau, Noricum und Pannonien, Vienna, 1973, pp. 45–59.
- Frantisek Krizek: Die römischen Stationen im Vorland des norisch-pannonischen Limes bis zu den Markomannenkriegen [The Roman stations in the foreland of the Noric-Pannonian Limes up to the Marcomannic Wars]. In: Studien zu den Militärgrenzen Roms. Vorträge des 6. Internationalen Limeskongresses in Süddeutschland. Böhlau Verlag, Cologne/Graz, 1967, pp. 131–137.
- Miroslava Mirkovic: Moesia Superior, Eine Provinz an der Mittleren Donau [Moesia Superior. A Province at the Middle Danube]. Zaberns Bildbände zur Archäologie, Sonderbände der Antiken Welt, Verlag Philipp v. Zabern, Mainz, 2007, ISBN 978-3-8053-3782-3.
- Orsolya Heinrich-Tamáska: Überlegungen zu den Hauptgebäuden der pannonischen Innenbefestigungen im Kontext spätrömischer Villenarchitektur [Reflections on the main buildings of the Pannonian inner fortifications in the context of late Roman villa architecture]. pp. 233 - 242, in: Gerda v. Bülow und Heinrich Zahbelicky: (edb.) Bruckneudorf und Gamzigrad. Spätantike Paläste und Großvillen im Donau-Balkan-Raum, Files of the International Colloquium in Bruckneudorf from 15 to 18 October 2008, Dr. Rudolf Habelt GmbH, Bonn, 2011. ISBN 978-3-900305-59-8.
