= Partiscum (castra) =

- Location within Hungary
- 46.252567°N 20.150408°E
- Location: Szeged, Csongrád-Csanád, Hungary

History
- Founded: 2nd century AD

Site notes
- Elevation: 80 m (260 ft)
- Condition: Ruined

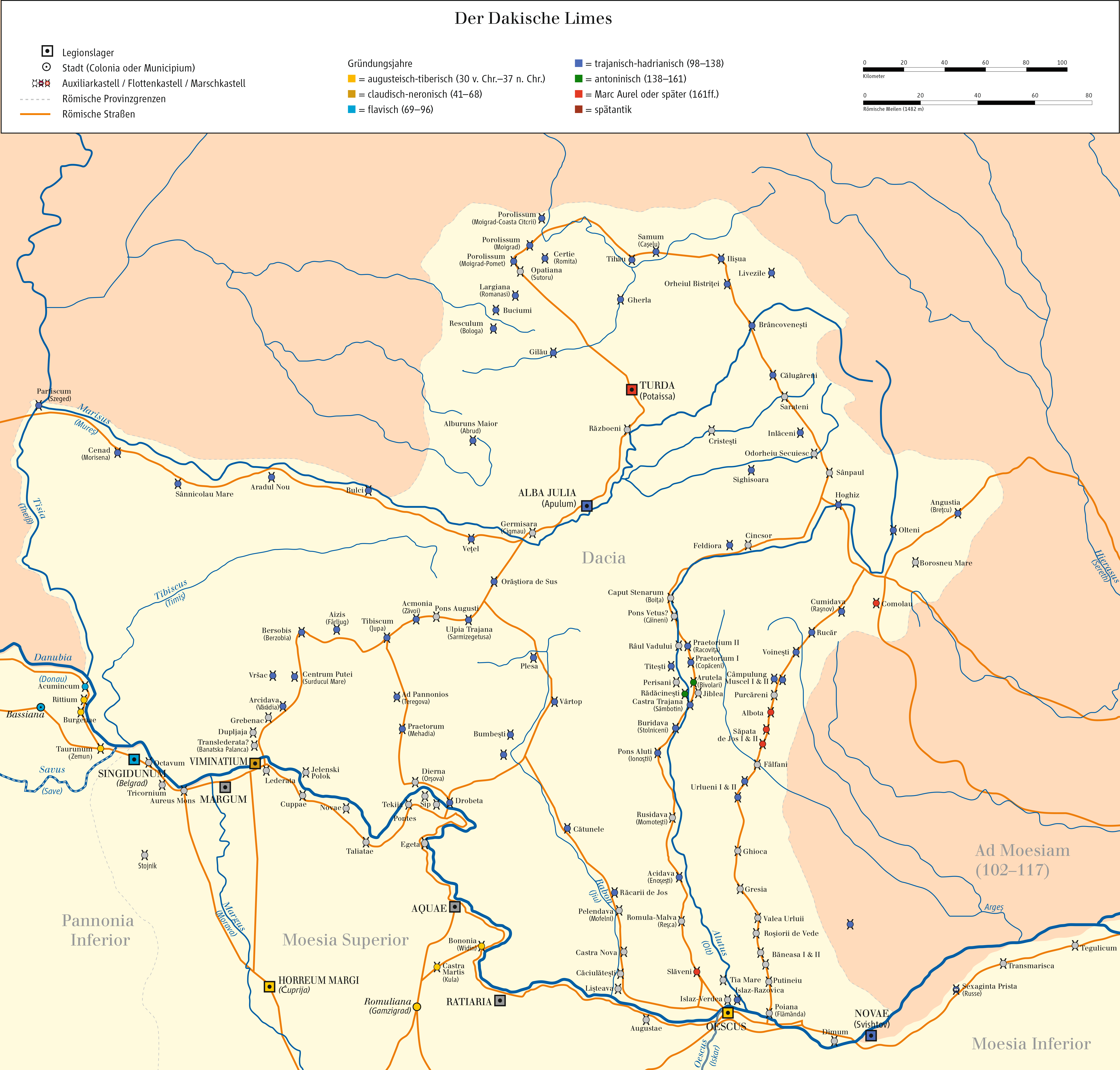

Partiscum was a fort in the Roman province of Dacia along the limes of Marisus river. It is the most Western fort of Dacia. Its ruins are located nearby Szeged, Csongrád-Csanád County, Hungary. Latest research showed that the most likely place was in Szeged, near the Tisza river, at the old Castle of Szeged.

== Location ==
In prehistory, the area was the territory of the Iazyges (or Jazygei), a subgroup of Sarmatians.

The Roman fort, first mentioned as Partiscum by Claudius Ptolemy in the 2nd century A.D., lies in southern Hungary and in the southern part of the Great Hungarian Plain on the lower reaches of the Tisza River, which flows into the Danube about 120 kilometres south into Serbia/Vojvodina. At the eastern city border the Maros (Latin Marisus, Romanian Mureș) flows into the Tisza. The Maros forms here also the natural border to Romania. The Roman ruins are today covered by the city centre.

In antiquity, an important traffic connection coming from the west led to Partiscum and further over the Marosch Valley to inner Dacia. The road connection started from castra Lugio/Florentia. This garrison, together with fortified naval area of late antiquity Burgus contra Florentiam, guarded the Pannonian Danube Limes and the border area around the road meeting the Roman Empire here. Traces of Roman settlements could be uncovered in particular on the western bank of the Tisza River under the fortress erected in the Middle Ages.

== History of research ==
During the demolition of the Szeged fortress, last restored under Empress and Queen Maria Theresia, between 1876 and 1883 a large number of Spoli came to light, a small part of which was of Roman origin. The Spolia, which was discovered by the ethnographer Károly Cs. Sebestyén (1876-1956) first published find material is not explicitly of military origin and thus only testifies to a Roman settlement.

However, during the construction of a canal for the municipal sewerage system in 1877, the engineer responsible, István Kováts, may have cut the walls of the presumed castle on the site of the fortress. He attached a sketch to his report:

During the excavations we came to the conclusion that this could be the third fortress on the same site. Proof of this are the 15 walls found under the ground, two of which are shown in the drawing, 300 metres apart in parallel; one of the walls is between the fortress and the town hall and 150 metres from the fortress. The remaining 13 walls run in different directions.

In particular, the latter wall attracted the attention of the archaeologist Pál Lakatos, as trees were not even allowed to be planted in this area, which belonged to the fortress's bombardment area, until the 19th century. Old plans proved that there never was a building there in the early modern period. But the strength of the two parallel walls, found at a depth of 5.70 to 7.60 metres, is extraordinarily strong at three metres for a Principate fort. In addition, a fort 300 metres wide that would almost reach the dimensions of a legionary camp would not be adjustable at this location. What these walls belonged to remains unknown without modern excavations. Rather, archaeologists such as Dénes Gabler suspect the Roman military station in the area of a castle palace of the Árpád period, which was located there before the construction of the great fortress at its southern fortification. In this area Roman floor tiles were also discovered in situ (see below). The small castle palace could have taken up structures of the fort. Since the presumed area at the corner of Vár Street and Deák-Ferenc Street is now covered by buildings, research has become impossible.

The area of the former Szeged fortress has not yet been systematically investigated. Due to the medieval, early modern and modern construction, no traces of the Roman fortification have survived above ground. The dense concentration of findings in this zone, however, indicates the location of the presumed fort. An alabastern relief fragment discovered in 1924 in the southern Szegedin district of Alsóváros could also have reached it in the post-Roman period.

== Development ==
According to András Alföldi (1895–1981), the Romans founded a garrison in Partiscum during the reign of Emperor Antoninus Pius (138–161), when Rome had secured its position against the Iazyges, who lived between the Danube and the Carpathians and their northwestern allies, the Germanic Quads. An agreement between Romans and Iazyges probably secured the establishment of a settlement. Roman tourist traffic between the castra Lugio (Dunaszekcső) and Dacia subsequently began even after the province of Dacia was evacuated in 271, this highway could have existed. This may be indicated by Burgus contra Florentiam from Dunaszekcső, was built during the reign of Emperor Valentinian I (364-375). However, findings that would prove a late-antique settlement continuity of Partiscum have not yet come to light.

In the beginning the assumed fort might have been occupied by a legionary exile. Since the peace treaty of 175 dictated by Emperor Marcus Aurelius (161-180), Roman officials have also been on the territory of the always restless and rebellious Iazyges. As security for the Romans, the Iazyges had to place hostages according to the contract conditions at that time.

In modern research it is still controversially discussed whether the Romans under Marcus Aurelius occupied the entire Tisza Basin to establish two new provinces (Sarmatia and Marcomannia). However, the stratigraphic investigations of the archaeologist Sándor Soproni (1926-1995) on the Limes Sarmatiae, which was massively developed in late antiquity and which since then has surrounded the Iazyges area, seem to confirm this assumption. Soproni was also able to determine that already under Marcus Aurelius - at least partially - work had taken place in the area of this boundary wall. It is also certain that the Iazyges' area should now be used as a military buffer zone to relieve the Danube border with Pannonia. For the victory over the Sarmatians, Marcus Aurelius and his son Commodus received the honorary title Sarmaticus (Maximus) in the autumn of 175. Relevant findings suggest that Attila or Bleda temporarily opened their residences here in late antiquity (see below).

== Function ==
At the latest with the establishment of the Roman province of Dacia after the Second Dacian War (105-106 AD), the direct road connection from Pannonia via Partiscum to Dacia became even more important for Rome. On their route, transports and troop contingents could be moved quickly without having to take the long detour along the Danube. In addition, in Partiscum, where the Marosch/Mureș (Latin Marisus) from Transylvania flowed into the Tisza and finally into the Danube, shipping traffic could also be controlled at a prominent location. The auxiliary cohort, perhaps stationed here later, was also responsible for monitoring and securing the road connection to Micia, which ran southeast along the southern bank of the Marosch/Mureș.

Salt, gold and wood were transported on the water and land routes that converged at Partiscum. The function of the ancient Partiscum as an important trading centre is also illustrated by the consecration stone of a Roman road official, which is described in more detail below. The inscription shows that Partiscum must also have been a stage for the state courier service, Cursus publicus.

After the extension of the Limes Sarmatiae, Partiscum lays almost exactly in the middle of this region extending between the Danube and the Great Plain. The border fortifications bear witness to the centuries-old Roman attempt to control the Iazyges, which was difficult to keep under control. Military outposts along the Limes Sarmatiae were also to serve this purpose. In addition to the unfinished Valentinian castra of Göd-Bócsaújtelep near the border, which was to stand at the beginning of the northern section of the Sarmatian Limes, the construction of the burgus of Hatvan-Gombospuszta also began during this expansion phase.

== Important finds ==
The research results made it clear that the Roman findings made in the early modern fortress showed no connection to Iazygian material.

== Votive altar ==
Partiscum/Szeged had been a strategically important border fortress since the Middle Ages, but after the Turkish wars, which were devastating for Hungary, had subsided in 1686, it became less and less important. With the demolition of the fortress, several Roman finds came to light, including a votive altar in the form of a sheet of foil, which names a Praefectus vehiculationis (chief road warden) as its dedicant:

   [...]
   cond(uctoris) p(ublici) p(ortorii)
   et praef(ecti)
   ve]hicul[o]
   rum
   Mercato(r)
   vili(cus)
   v(otum) s(olvit) l(ibens) m(erito)

According to Alföldi, the stone, which had been cut to a great extent for secondary use, was created during the reign of Emperor Antoninus Pius (138-161).

== Brick stamps ==
It is said that 38 Roman bricks were discovered during the demolition work in the fortress, but only seven of them were brought to the Ferenc Móra Museum in Szeged. Only one remains today. As far as is known, it is the only one to bear a brick stamp with the stamp IMP - probably for Imperator - and was therefore possibly fired in a brickworks under imperial administration. The archaeologist János Szilágyi (1907-1988), known for his extensive work on Roman brick stamps, dated this brick back to the reign of the emperors Caracalla (211-217) or Elagabal (218-222). Other scientists assume that it originated in the 2nd century A.D.

== Antefixum ==
Also from the overburden of the fortress came two fragments of an antefixum, a decorated facing brick, of which only a part remains today. The piece of red, hard-fired terracotta shows a palmette and spiral lines. Due to the fine workmanship of the piece, it probably was not made after the end of the 2nd century AD.

== Brick floors ==
During the fortress's demolition, two Roman floors made of small bisque and octagonal fired bricks were discovered in situ. The first group of stones, found near the castle courtyard, had a yellow-brown colour; the two remaining octagonal bricks are brick red and grey. The octagonal floor tiles also include a small brick that is square in plan and once filled the gaps of the ornamental floor set of octagonal bricks. Biscuit-shaped floor tiles were found in the Dacian Tibiscum (Caransebeș) and in Sarmizegetusa Regia (Grădiștea de Munte), among other places. They were also found in the Pannonian settlements of Siscia (Sisak), Aquincum (Budapest) and Brigetio (Komárom). The floor of a room of the palaestra and in the amphitheater of the civil city of Aquincum, on the other hand, had floors of octagonal bricks. János Reizner (1847-1904), who became known as a local historian, mentioned that the Roman floor of biscuit-shaped bricks, which was obviously at least partially complete up to then, was destroyed by the demolition workers and that many civil servants used the broken bricks as paperweights. The diversity of the two brick groups points to two different rooms in which these had been laid.

Possibly the floors belonged to a mansio (street station), in which the travelers could recover from the strains and spend the night.

== Sculptural decoration ==
In the area of the fortress and town of Szeged, some of the more valuable antiquities were discovered, which may not have arrived here until the 18th century. A convoy consisting of three ships with antique art treasures, which were collected in Transylvania and were to be brought to Vienna, was ordered by Emperor Charles VI (1711-1740). The ships were on the Marosch/Mure in the direction of the Tisza, as one sank near Szeged. An attempted salvage failed. It is possible that a well elaborated bust of a Roman discovered in the 20th century at the mouth of the Marosch river originates from this cargo. Other pieces may also have found their way to Szeged in the course of time, so that a clear localization of various finds from Szeged that did not come to light in situ will in many cases be impossible.

In 1877, a marble male head from the 2nd century A.D. was excavated at a depth of about 7.60 metres during excavation work on the above-mentioned canal inside the fortress, which had been cleared for demolition. The piece belonged to a relief, as its reverse side is flat and unfinished. Kováts tells us that the remaining parts of this relief were also found, but that the workers threw these pieces back into the excavation pit. The depth of the site can be explained by the many fortifications and alterations that the fortress of Szeged underwent over the centuries. It also suggests that this relief may have been in Partiscum/Szeged as early as Roman times.

== Coin treasure ==
As the scholar and Piarist friar András Dugonics (1740-1818) reports, in 1794 large quantities of silver coins from the reign of Emperor Marcus Aurelius (161-180) were discovered next to the provisions house near the fortress. Whether this could have been a depot find that was found in the ???

This hoard find is the largest collection of Hunnic gold objects ever known. It was found before the First World War in a vineyard in Nagyszéksós, formerly part of Szeged and now part of the Röszós district. Before being reported to the authorities, a large number of the treasures disappeared, some of which have remained lost to this day. By 1966 the number of gold objects in museums and private collections had reached 200.

Only specimens from catacomb tombs discovered in 1904 on the Kerch Peninsula are approximately comparable with the late antique Nagyszéksós hoard find. Among the finds of Nagyszéksós, there is not a single object that could determine the period of its origin or concealment to the nearest decade. Archaeologists interpreted the discovery of Nagyszéksós for a long time as a cremation or as the remains of a mound grave eroded by natural erosion. However, this assumption was later rejected, as there is no knowledge that the Huns burnt their dead.

An important finding here was the Hunnic treasure of Szeged-Nagyszeksös.

== Whereabouts ==
The Roman finds recovered during the demolition of the early modern fortress are now in the Ferenc Móra Museum in Szeged.

== Protection of historical monuments ==
The monuments of Hungary are protected according to the Act No. LXIV of 2001 by registration in the Register of Monuments. The State Office of Cultural Heritage (Kulturális Örökségvédelmi Hivatal; KÖH) in Budapest is the responsible institution. The Limes complexes belong to the nationally valuable cultural heritage as archaeological sites according to § 3.1. All finds are state property according to § 2.1, no matter where they are found. Violations of the export regulations are considered a criminal offense or crime and are punishable by imprisonment for up to three years.

== See also ==
- List of castra
