= Liesing (Schwechat) =

River in eastern Austria

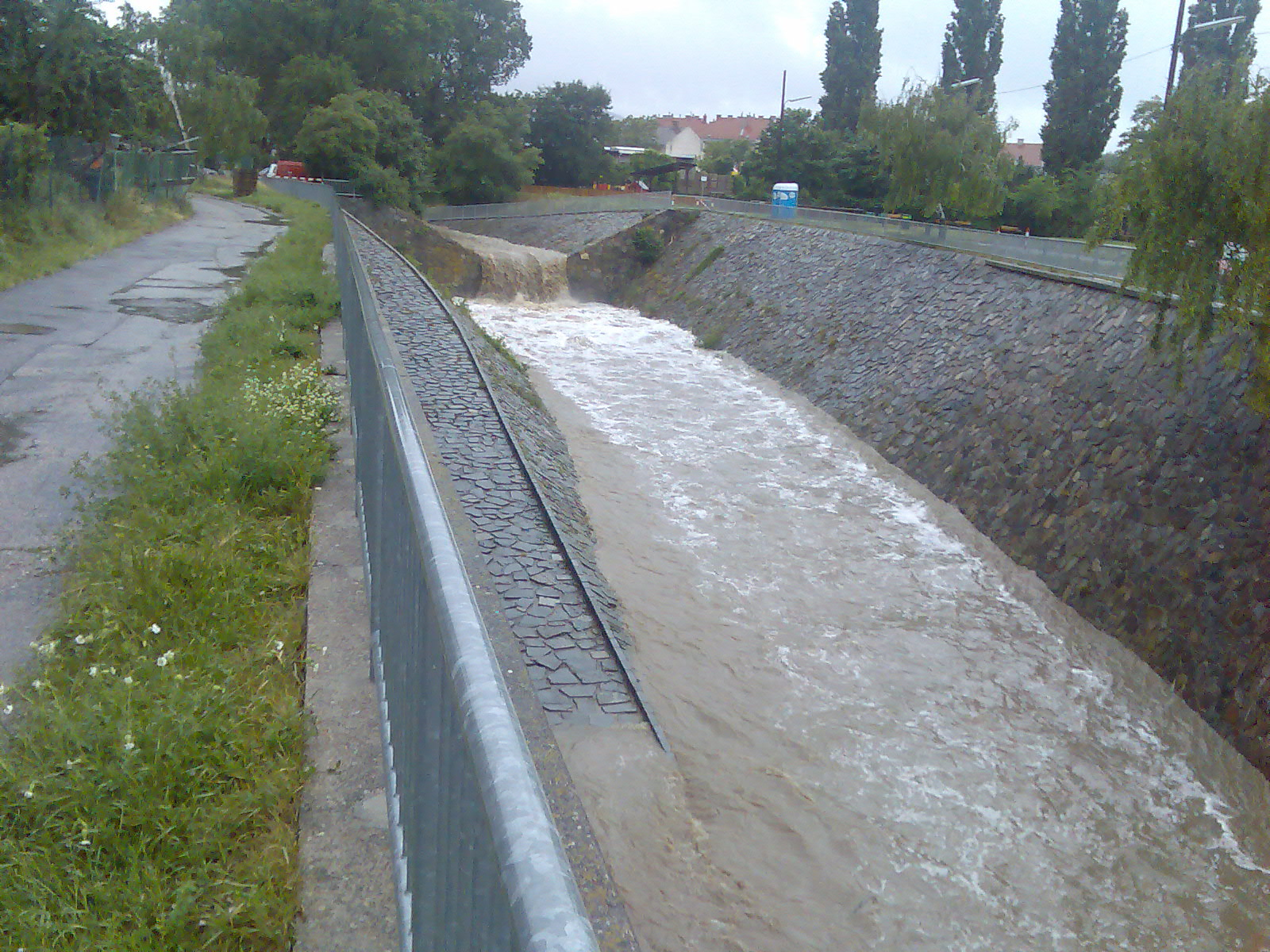

Location
- State: Lower Austria

Physical characteristics
- Mouth: Schwechat
  - coordinates: 48°08′12″N 16°28′14″E
- Length: 30 km (19 mi)

Basin features
- Progression: Schwechat→ Danube→ Black Sea

The Liesing, also known as the Liesingbach, is a 30-kilometre-long (19 mi) river, a tributary of the Schwechat, which rises in the Vienna Woods, then flows through the city of Vienna (where the stream gives its name to Liesing, the 23rd district of Vienna) and joins the Schwechat in Lower Austria near the city of Schwechat.

== See also ==
- List of rivers of Austria
