= Schwechat (river) =

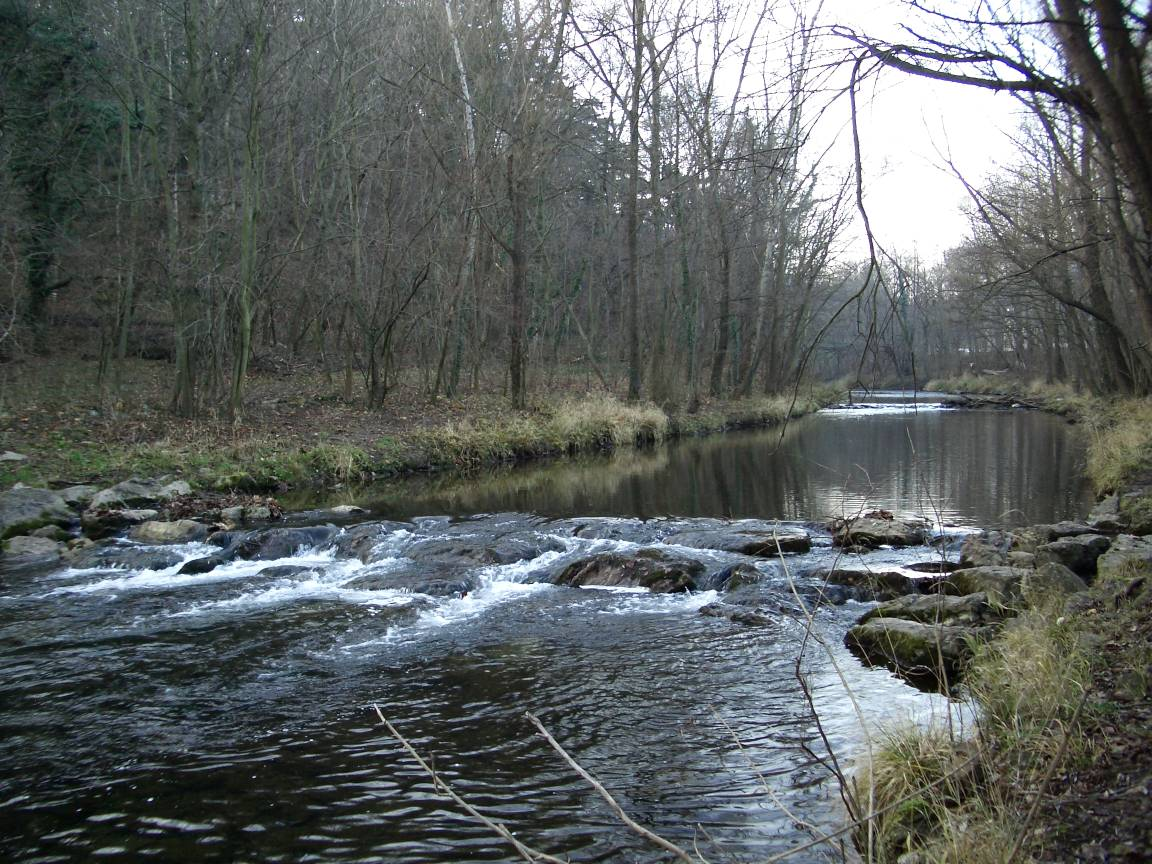

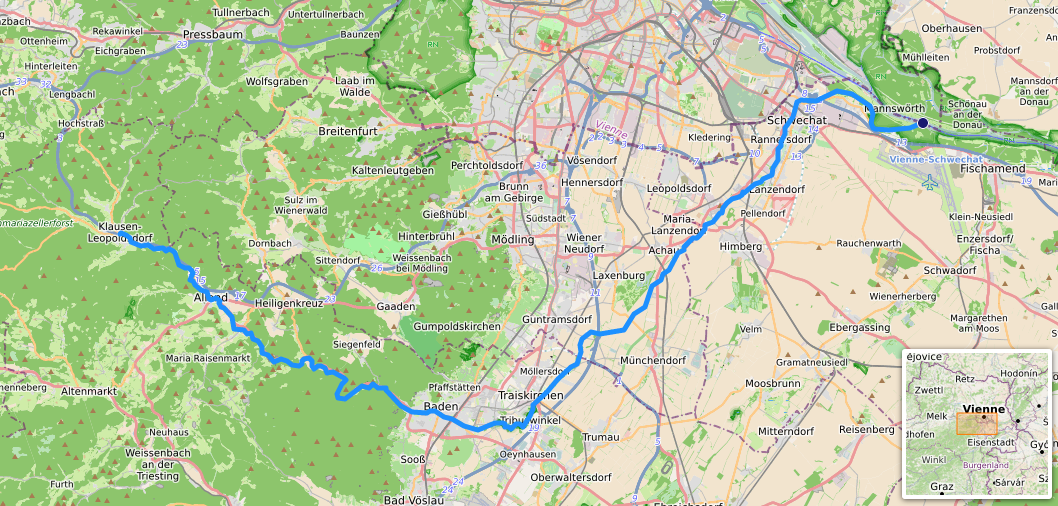
- Path of the Schwechat

Location
- Country: Austria
- State: Lower Austria
- Towns: Alland; Baden; Schwechat

Physical characteristics
- Source
  - location: Schöpfl, Vienna Woods
  - elevation: 893 m (2,930 ft)
- Mouth: Danube
  - location: near Schwechat
  - coordinates: 48°08′16″N 16°33′37″E
- Length: 62 km (39 mi)
- Basin size: 1,182 km^{2} (456 sq mi)

Basin features
- Progression: Danube→ Black Sea
- Tributaries
  - left: Sattelbach, Mödlingbach, Petersbach, Liesing
  - right: Triesting, Kalter Gang

The Schwechat (German pronunciation: [ˈʃvɛçat]) is a river in Lower Austria. Its drainage basin is 1,182 km^{2} (456 sq mi).

== River course ==
The source is near the Schöpfl (893 m) in the Vienna Woods. The source streams are the Riesenbach, Lammeraubach, Agsbach, Hainbach and the Großkrottenbach, which merge at Klausen-Leopoldsdorf to form the Schwechat. It flows through the small town of Alland, through the Helenental to Baden, and through the Vienna Basin to Schwechat, where the river flows into in the Danube.

== Helenental ==
The Helenental is the Schwechat valley from Mayerling to Baden, named for the parish church of St Helena (Pfarrkirche St Helena), about 2 miles (3 km) from the town center of Baden. Originally gothic, it has since been replaced by a baroque structure.

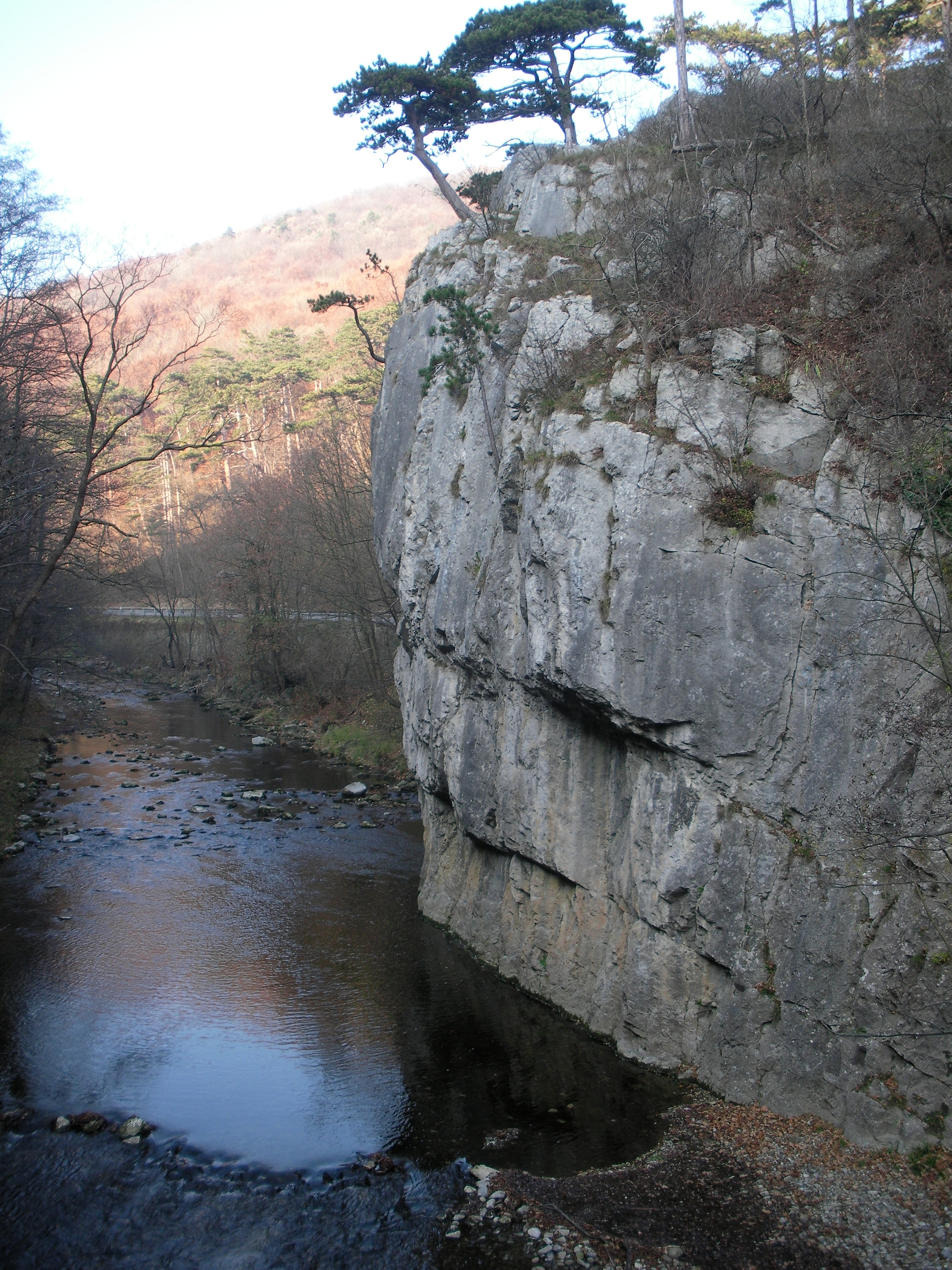
Helenental, Urtelstein
