= Lower Austria Museum =

National museum in St. Pölten in Lower Austria

Coordinates: 48°12′00″N 15°37′54″E

Lower Austria Museum (Museum Niederösterreich)
- Logo of the museum
- Established: 1903
- Location: St. Pölten
- Type: universal museum
- Architect: Hans Hollein
- Owner: NÖ Museum Betriebs GmbH
- Website: http://www.museumnoe.at

The Lower Austria Museum (German: Museum Niederösterreich), formerly the Lower Austria State Museum (Landesmuseum Niederösterreich), is the national museum for the state of Lower Austria and covers the fields of history, art and nature. It is located in St. Pölten in Lower Austria.

Before it moved to St. Pölten in 2002, the museum, which was founded in 1902 by the Association for Cultural Studies, occupied several locations in Vienna. For example, in the period 1912-1923 it was based in Wallnerstraße and, from 1923 to 1997, it was housed in the Palais Mollard-Clary. On the establishment of the new state capital of St. Pölten, the state museum was transferred to the cultural region it represents.

On November 15, 2025, the museum celebrated the first "children's state holiday" with special programmes and exhibitions designed for children.

== Gallery ==
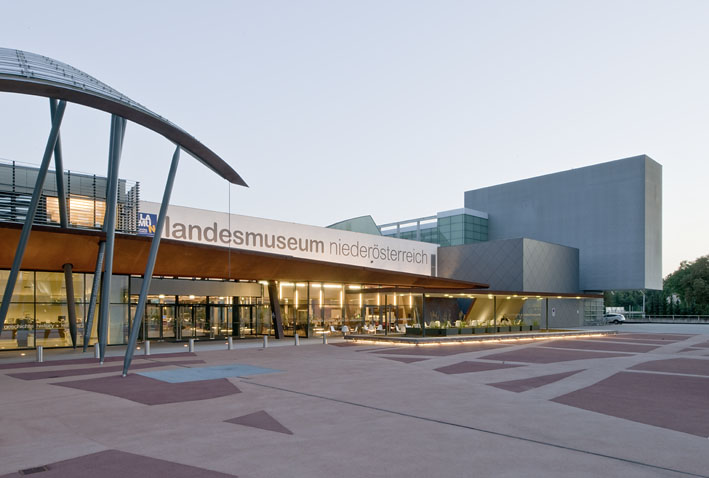

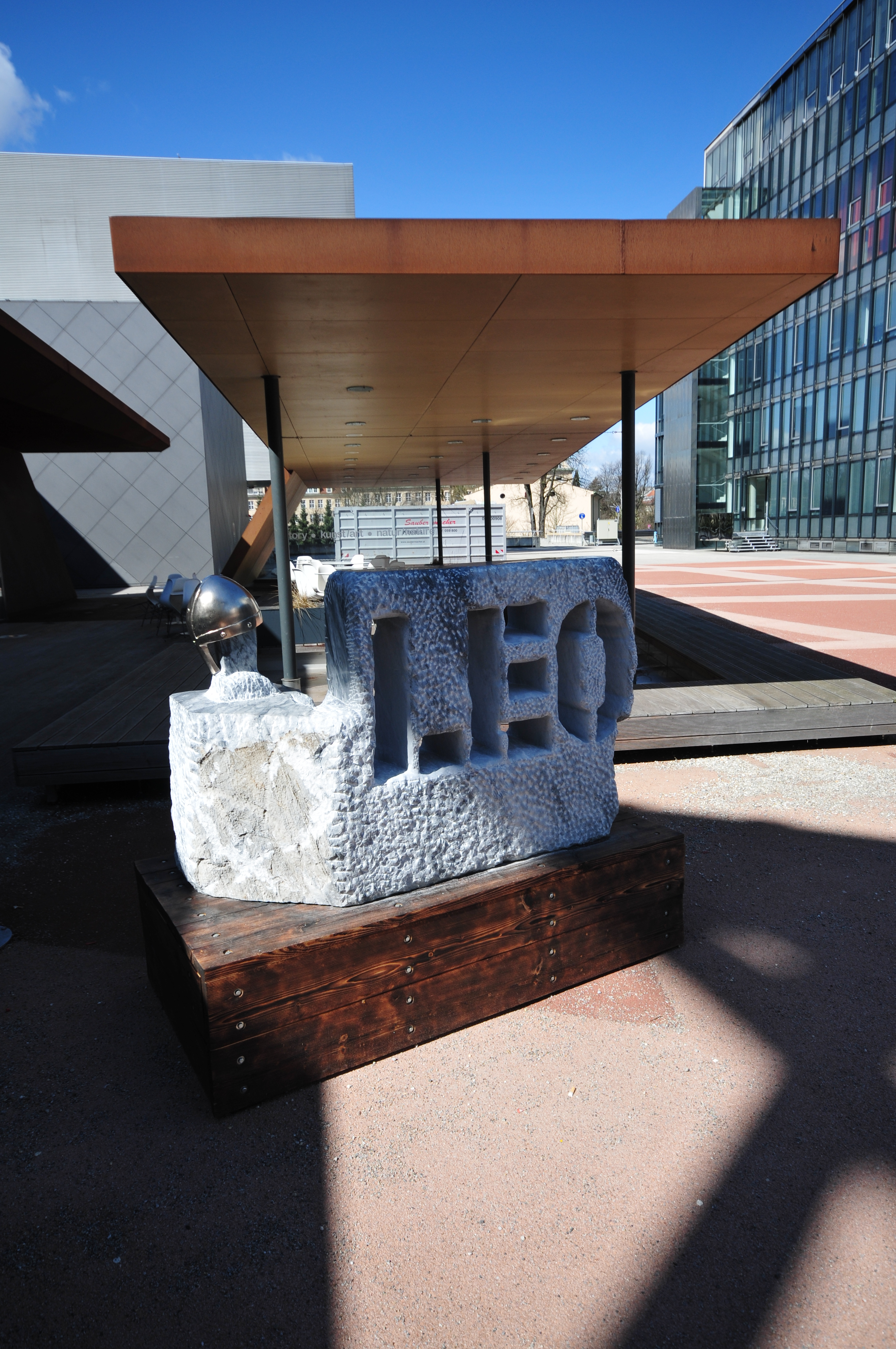

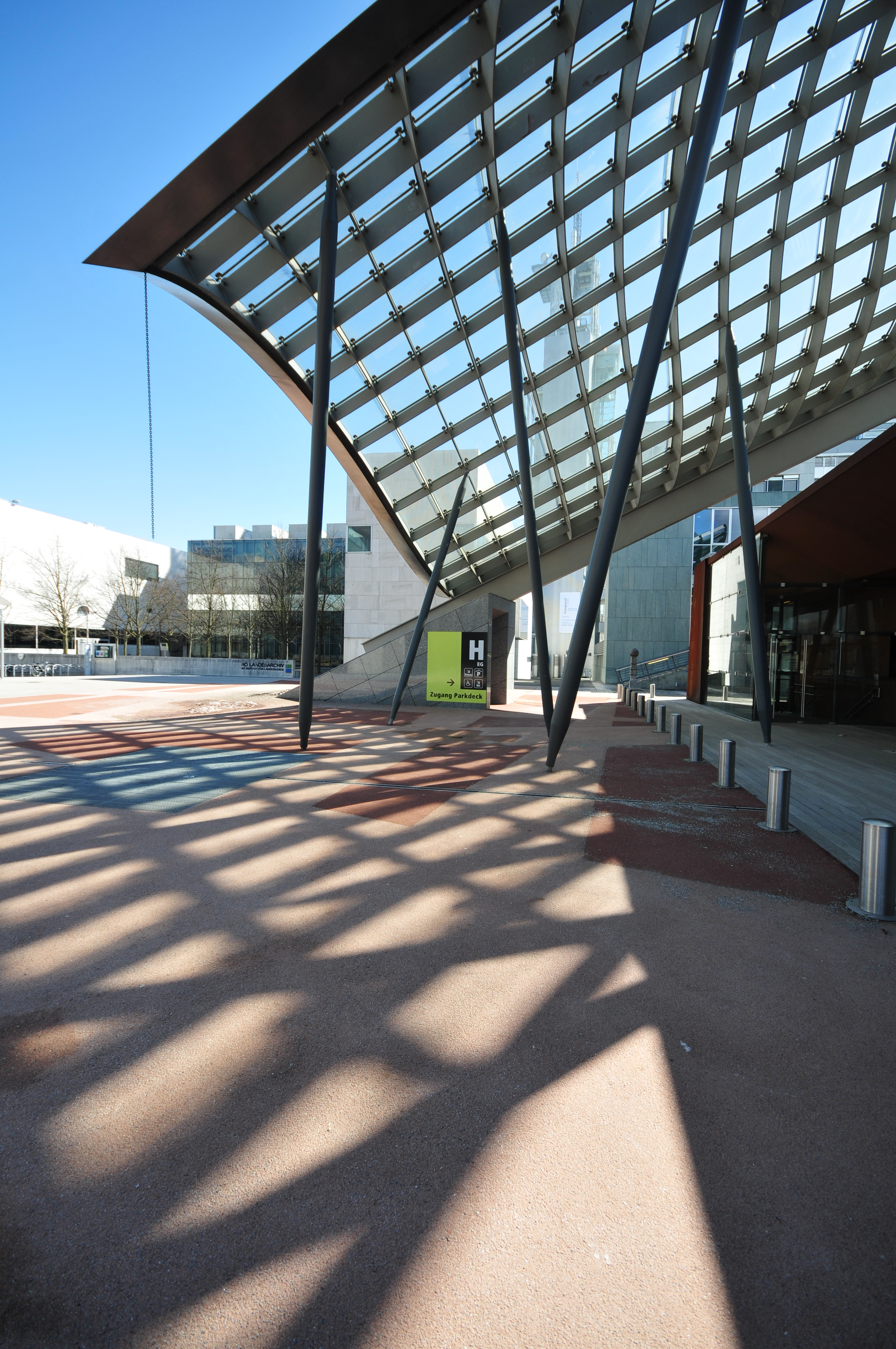

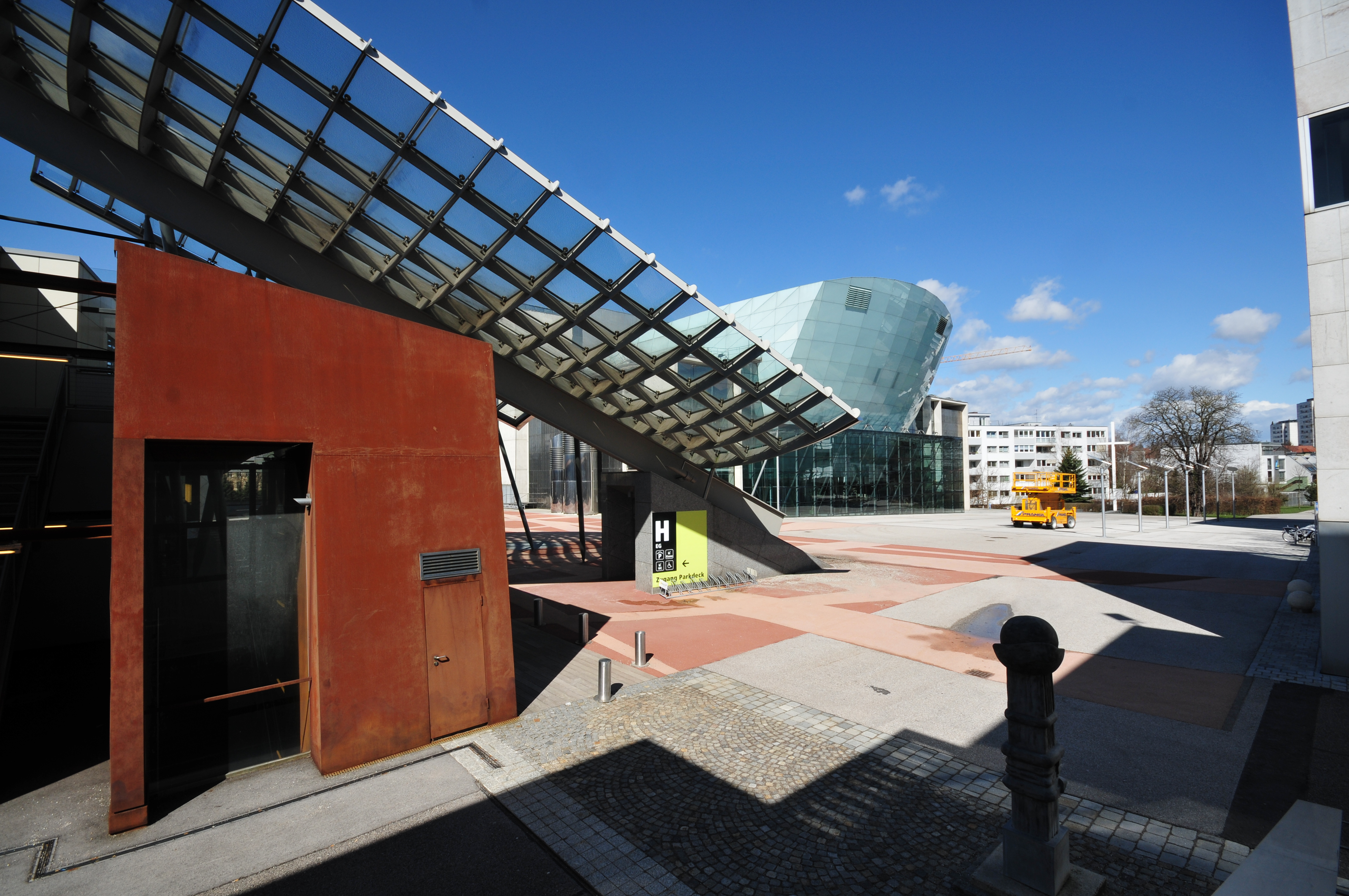
