= Kalter Gang =

River in Austria

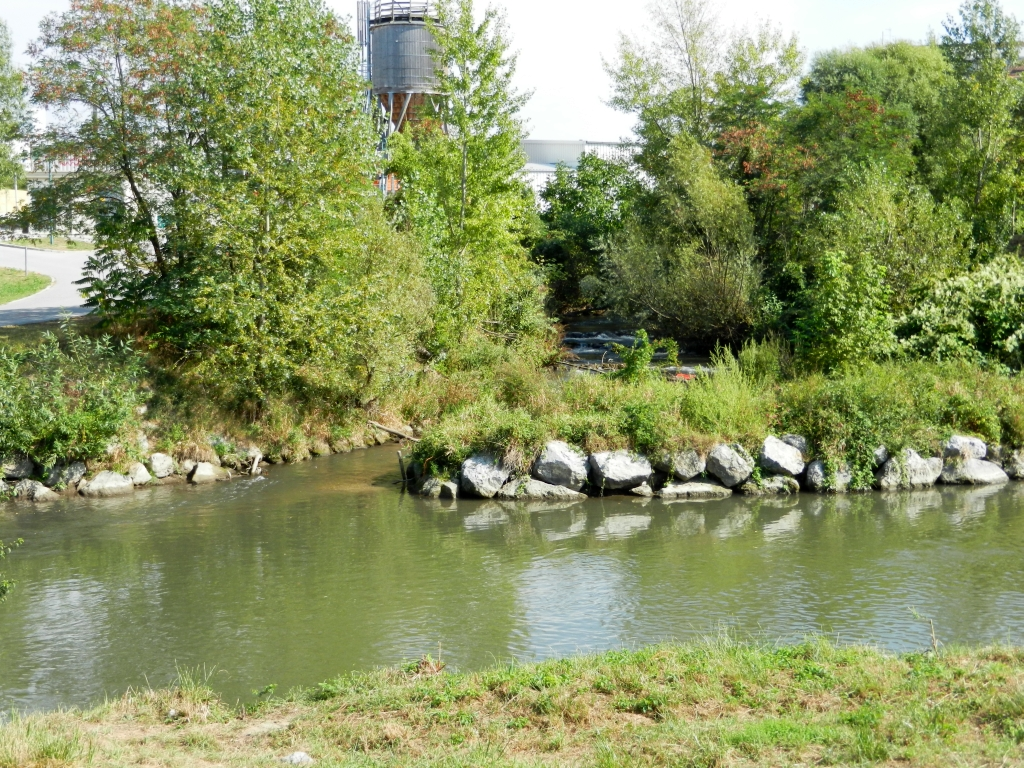

Location
- State: Lower Austria
- Region: Industrieviertel

Physical characteristics
- Mouth: Schwechat
  - coordinates: 48°08′44″N 16°28′36″E

The Kalter Gang is a river in the Industrieviertel of Lower Austria, south of Vienna. It is a tributary of the Schwechat.

== Geography ==
The Kalter Gang feeds on many groundwater sources in the area of the Mitterndorfer Senke, which are located in the municipal area of Ebreichsdorf right next to the Piesting. For this reason, the middle and upper reaches of the Piesting have often been erroneously referred to as the Kalter Gang. Measurement results show, however, that the Kalter Gang is an independent body of water that is characterised by more even water temperatures (hence the name; lit. 'cold stream') and a higher magnesium sulphate content than the Piesting.

== Conservation ==
An approximately 1 km (0.6 mile) long section of the river near Pellendorf was rehabilitated in early 2019.

== See also ==
- Vienna Basin
- List of rivers of Austria
