= Schwechat =

- Municipality
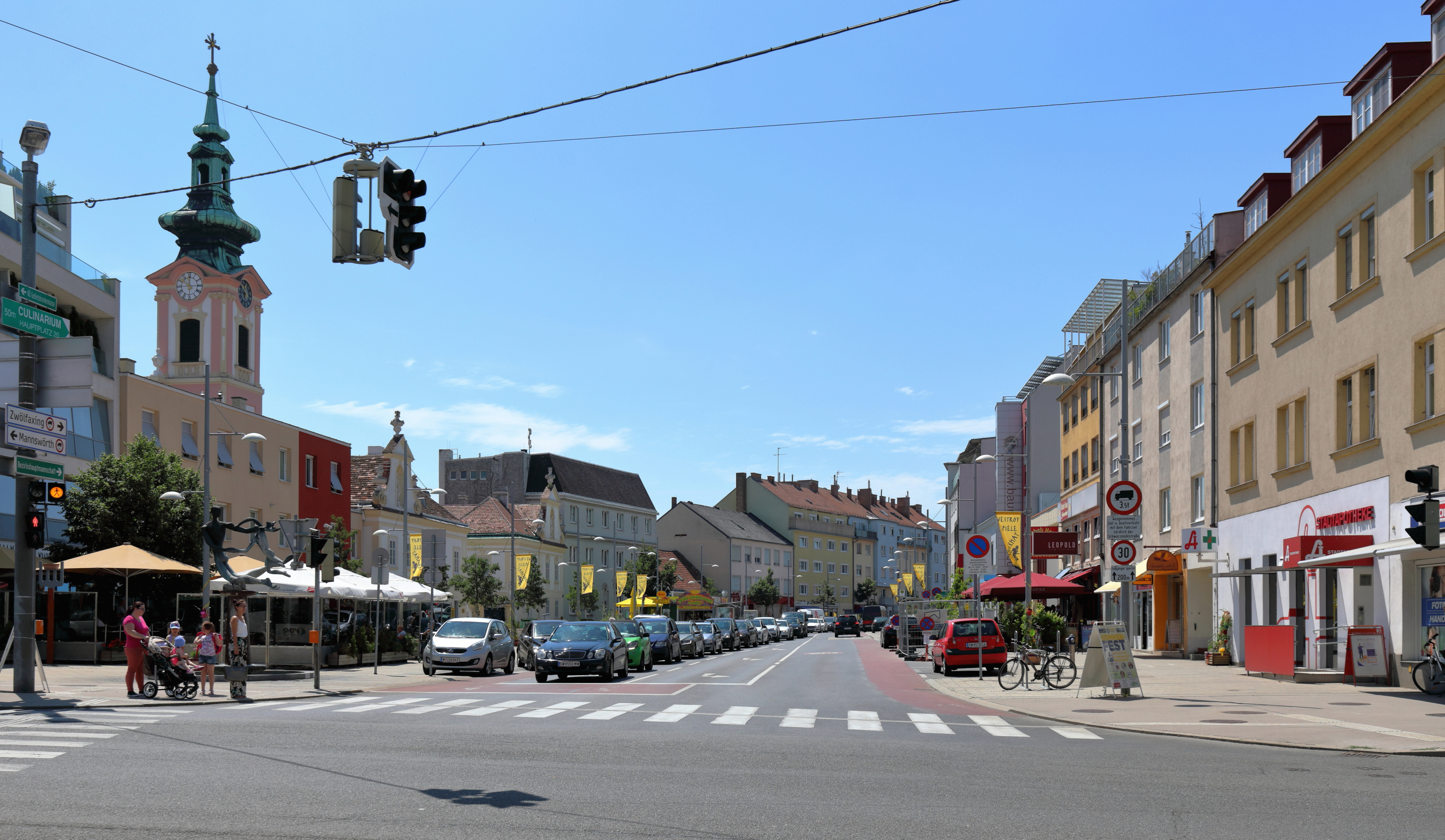
- The central square in 2019

- Coat of arms

- Location within Austria Schwechat (Austria)
- Coordinates: 48°08′28″N 16°28′43″E
- Country: Austria
- State: Lower Austria
- District: Bruck an der Leitha

Government
  - Mayor: Karin Baier (SPÖ)

Area
  - Total: 44.73 km^{2} (17.27 sq mi)
- Elevation: 162 m (531 ft)

Population (2018-01-01)
  - Total: 18,026
  - Density: 403.0/km^{2} (1,044/sq mi)
- Time zone: UTC+1 (CET)
  - Summer (DST): UTC+2 (CEST)
- Postal code: 2320
- Area code: 01
- Vehicle registration: SW
- Website: www.schwechat.gv.at

Schwechat (German pronunciation: [ˈʃvɛçaːt]) is a city southeast of Vienna known for the Vienna International Airport and Schwechater beer. The city is home to the refineries of the Austrian national oil company OMV.

== Geography ==
Schwechat is named after the river Schwechat, which flows through the centre of town. The city subdivisions, called Katastralgemeinde (Cadastre), are Kledering, Mannswörth, Rannersdorf and Schwechat.

== Population ==
Historical population
Year	Pop.	±%
1869	7,458	—
1880	8,910	+19.5%
1890	10,327	+15.9%
1900	13,636	+32.0%
1910	14,625	+7.3%
1923	14,372	−1.7%
1934	14,936	+3.9%
1939	14,813	−0.8%
1951	13,270	−10.4%
1961	13,403	+1.0%
1971	15,303	+14.2%
1981	14,834	−3.1%
1991	14,669	−1.1%
2001	15,286	+4.2%
2011	16,329	+6.8%

== History ==
Home to the settlement Ala Nova of the Roman Empire, the city was first mentioned in a document in 1334.

In 1724, a textile factory was established in Schwechat. Schwechat profited massively from the Austrian industrialisation wave of the 19th century, many of the companies established then still exist (i.e. the Dreher Brewery, founded in 1796 by Franz Anton Dreher the Younger). Schwechat became a city in 1924 and was incorporated into Vienna in 1938. The city's oil refinery was a bombing target of the Allied Oil Campaign of World War II, with the southern aviation plant complex of the Heinkel firm (Germany-based at Rostock-Schmarl as Heinkel-Nord, the Schwechat offices/facility was called Heinkel-Süd) also targeted in late 1943 and lasting through the spring of 1944.

Schwechat became an independent city in 1954. Since 2017 it belongs to Bruck an der Leitha District because Wien-Umgebung was dissolved at the end of 2016.

== Economy ==
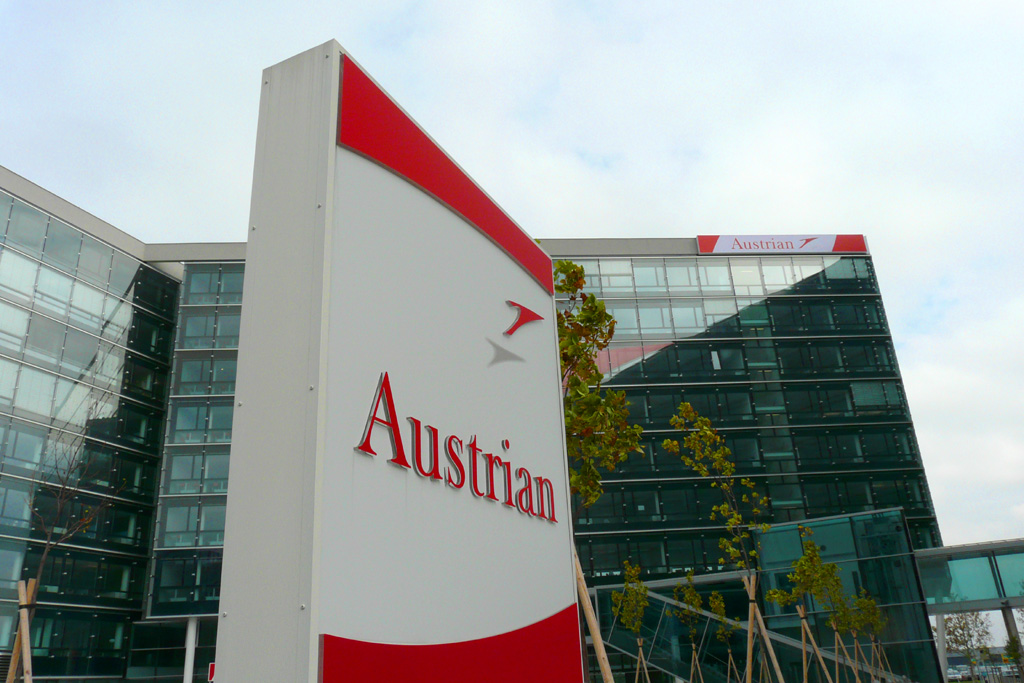
Austrian Airlines building

Vienna International Airport and the headquarters of Austrian Airlines are in the city of Schwechat.

When Lauda Air was an independent airline, it had its corporate headquarters in Schwechat. Niki was also based in Schwechat.

== Education ==
Schools include:

Primary schools:

- Volksschule I & II
- Volksschule Mannswörth
- Volksschule Rannersdorf

Secondary:

- Allgemeine Sonderschule Schwechat
- Bundesgymnasium & Bundesrealgymnasium Schwechat
- Neue Mittelschule Schwechat Frauenfeld
- Neue Sport- & Sprach-Mittelschule Schwechat - Schmidgasse

== Notable people ==
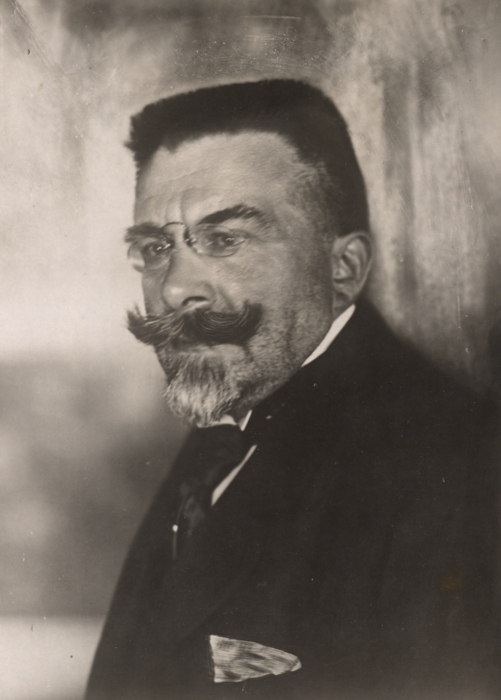
Ernst Seidler von Feuchtenegg, 1918

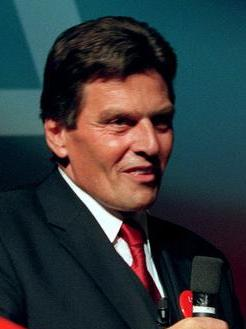
Viktor Klima, 2008

- Joseph Leopold Eybler (1765–1846), composer and Kapellmeister
- Ernst Ritter von Hartung (1808–1879), an Austrian General of the Artillery (Austria) and military theorist.
- Anton Dreher (senior) (1810–1863), brewer, inventor of Schwechater Lagerbier
- Anton Träg (1819–1860), an Austrian cellist and composer.
- Anton Schrödl (1820-1906), an Austrian painter of animals and genre scenes.
- Rudolf Hausleithner, (DE Wiki) (1840–1918), painter
- Ernst Seidler von Feuchtenegg (1862–1931), jurist, Minister-President of Cisleithania 1917/18
- Poldi Gersa (1874 – after 1902), an Austrian soprano and stage actress.
- Leopold Weinhofer, (DE Wiki) (1879–1947), politician (SDAP) and Mayor
- Alfred Horn, (DE Wiki) (1898–1959), politician (SPÖ), Mayor and freeman of Schwechat
- Max Stotz (1912–1943), military pilot
- Karl Trabitsch, (DE Wiki) (1929–2003), politician (ÖVP) and merchant
- Viktor Klima (born 1947), politician (SPÖ) and Chancellor of Austria, 1997-2000

=== Sport ===
- Rudolf Viertl (1902—1981), footballer, played 16 games for Austria
- Rudolf Vytlačil (1912—1977), a Czechoslovak football player and manager.
- Walter Skocik (born 1940), former footballer and football manager, played 314 games and 14 for Austria.
- Christopher Dibon (born 1990), footballer, played over 270 games

== In popular culture ==
Schwechat (as Megacity Schwechat) plays an important role in the Austrian sci-fi movie Die Gstettensaga: The Rise of Echsenfriedl.
