= Sándor Soproni =

Sándor Soproni (Szentendre Kingdom of Hungary 21 November 1926 – Budapest, Hungary, 10. November 1995) was a classical archeologist, of the Roman period. He worked for the Ferenczy Museum in Szentendre and later became its director.

== Life ==
He made excavation near Budakeszi for the ruins of the Baden–Pecel culture.

In his final years he taught at the Eötvös Loránd University’s Archeology Department.

The Museum of Stonework Finds in Bicske is named after him.

== Sources ==
- Tóth Endre 1995: Soproni Sándor (1926-1995).Numizmatikai közlöny 94-95/1, 135-136.
