= Principal passes of the Alps =

Coordinates: 47°36′12″N 11°38′08″E

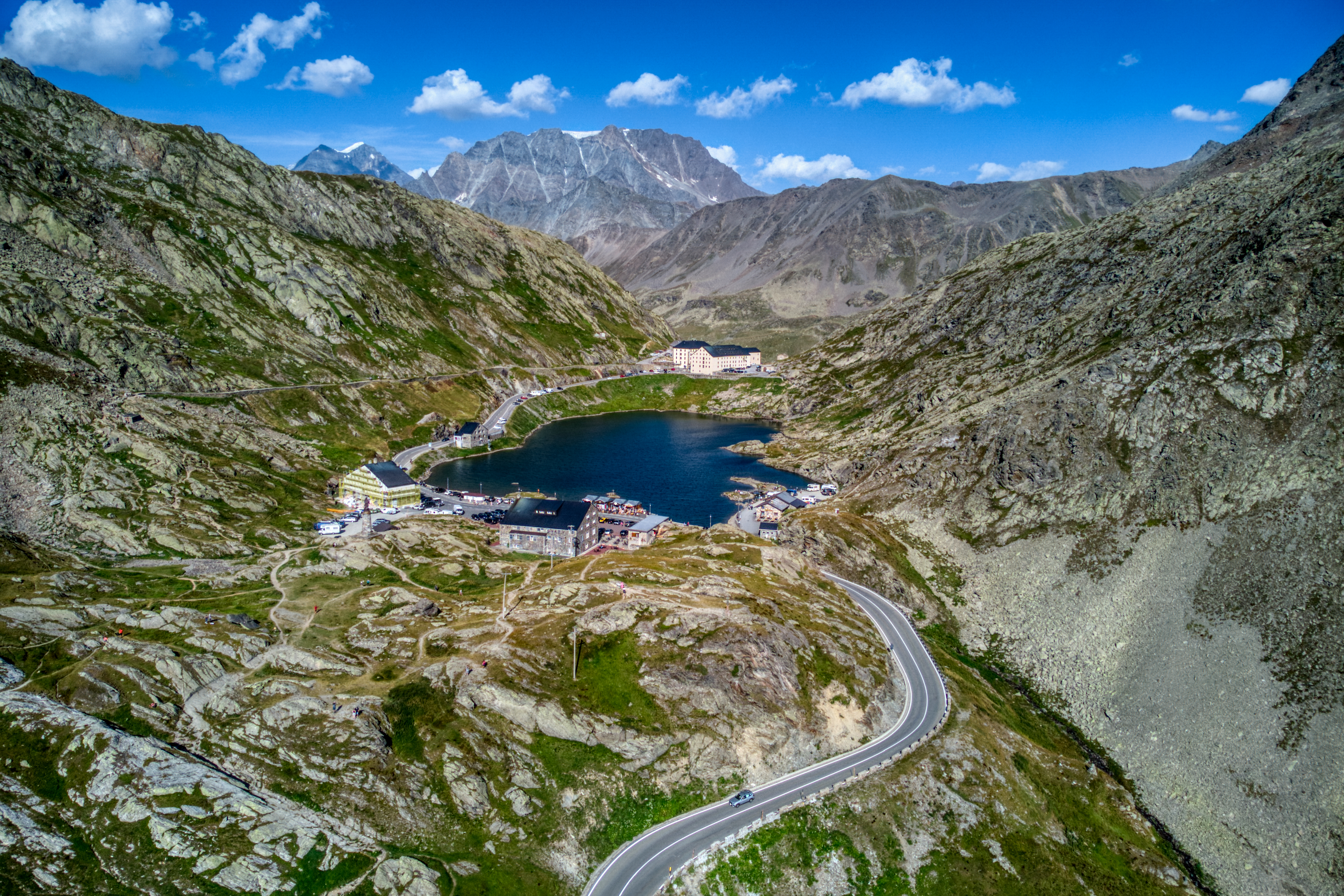
Great St Bernard Pass

This article lists the principal mountain passes and tunnels in the Alps, and gives a history of transport across the Alps.

== Main passes ==
The following are the main paved road passes across the Alps. Main indicates on the main chain of the Alps, from south west to east. Passes on subsidiary ranges are listed where the ridge leaves the main chain – N/W indicates north or west of the main chain, S/E on the south or east side. Heights in brackets indicate true pass height, not the high point of the road.

area	name	location	countries	elevation (m)
	Colle di Cadibona	Savona to Ceva	Italy	436
	Colle del Melogno	Finale Ligure to Ceva	Italy	1028
	Giogo di Toirano	Toirano to Bardineto	Italy	801
	Colle Scravaion	Albenga to Calizzano	Italy	814
	Colle San Bernardo	Albenga to Garessio	Italy	957
	Passo di Prale	Cisano sul Neva to Ormea	Italy	1258
	Colle di Nava	Imperia to Ormea	Italy	934
	Colle San Bernardo di Mendatica	Triora and Mendatica to Ormea (through Colle di Nava)	Italy	1262
Main	Col de Tende	Tende to Cuneo	France, Italy	1870
Main	Col de la Lombarde	Isola to Vinadio	France, Italy	2350
N/W	Col de la Bonette	Jausiers to Saint-Étienne-de-Tinée	France	2715
Main	Maddalena Pass/Col de Larche	Barcelonnette to Cuneo	France, Italy	1996
Main	Col Agnel	Queyras to Sampeyre	France, Italy	2744
Main	Col de Montgenèvre	Briançon to Susa	France, Italy	1854
Main	Col de l'Échelle	Briançon to Bardonecchia	France, Italy	1762
N/W	Col du Galibier	Saint-Michel-de-Maurienne to Col du Lautaret	France	2642
N/W	Col du Lautaret	Le Bourg-d'Oisans to Briançon	France	2058
Main	Col du Mont Cenis	Modane to Susa	France	2084
N/W	Col de l'Iseran	Val d'Isère to Bonneval-sur-Arc	France	2764
S/E	Col du Nivolet	Noasca to Courmayeur (no through road)	Italy	2641
Main	Little St Bernard Pass	Bourg-Saint-Maurice to Pré-Saint-Didier	France, Italy	2188
N/W	Col des Montets	Martigny to Chamonix	France	1461
Main	Great St Bernard Pass	Martigny to Aosta	Switzerland, Italy	2469
Main	Simplon Pass	Brig to Domodossola	Switzerland	2009 (1996)
Main	Nufenen Pass	Ulrichen to Airolo	Switzerland	2478
N/W	Furka Pass	Realp to Oberwald	Switzerland	2429
N/W	Grimsel Pass	Innertkirchen to Gletsch	Switzerland	2164
N/W	Susten Pass	Innertkirchen to Wassen	Switzerland	2224
Main	St Gotthard Pass	Andermatt to Airolo	Switzerland	2106
N/W	Oberalp Pass	Andermatt to Disentis	Switzerland	2044
N/W	Klausen Pass	Altdorf to Linthal	Switzerland	1948
Main	Lukmanier Pass	Disentis to Biasca	Switzerland	1915
Main	San Bernardino Pass	Splügen to Bellinzona	Switzerland	2065
Main	Splügen Pass	Splügen to Chiavenna	Switzerland, Italy	2115
N/W	Julier Pass	Tiefencastel to Silvaplana	Switzerland	2284
N/W	Albula Pass	Filisur to La Punt	Switzerland	2311
N/W	Flüela Pass	Davos to Susch	Switzerland	2383
N/W	Bielerhöhe	Sankt Gallenkirch to Galtür	Austria	2036
N/W	Arlberg Pass	Bludenz to Landeck	Austria	1793
N/W	Flexen Pass	Warth to Klostertal	Austria	1773
N/W	Hochtannbergpass	Dornbirn to Warth	Austria	1679
Main	Maloja Pass	Silvaplana to Chiavenna	Switzerland	1815
Main	Bernina Pass	Pontresina to Tirano	Switzerland	2328
Main	Livigno Pass	Poschiavo to Livigno	Switzerland, Italy	2315
Main	Foscagno Pass	Bormio to Livigno	Italy	2291
S/E	Umbrail Pass	Val Müstair to Bormio	Switzerland, Italy	2501
S/E	Giogo dello Stelvio	Bormio to Vinschgau	Italy	2757
S/E	Gavia Pass	Bormio to Ponte di Legno	Italy	2621
S/E	Tonale Pass	Ponte di Legno to Val di Sole	Italy	1883
S/E	Campo Carlo Magno	Madonna di Campiglio to Val di Sole	Italy	1655
S/E	Passo d'Aprica	Valtellina to Val Camonica	Italy	1172
Main	Fuorn Pass	Zernez to Val Müstair	Switzerland	2149
Main	Reschen Pass	Nauders to Meran	Austria, Italy	1507
Main	Timmelsjoch	Ötztal valley to Meran	Austria, Italy	2491
Main	Brenner Pass	Innsbruck to Sterzing	Austria, Italy	1370
Main	Hochtor	Zell am See to Lienz	Austria	2505 (2576)
Main	Radstädter Tauern Pass	Radstadt to Mauterndorf	Austria	1739
Main	Sölk Pass	Schöder to Gröbming	Austria	1788
Main	Triebener Tauern Pass	Judenburg to Trieben	Austria	1274
Main	Schober Pass	Liezen to Leoben	Austria	849
	Präbichl	Eisenerz to Leoben	Austria	1204
	Aflenzer Seeberg	Mariazell to Bruck an der Mur	Austria	1254
	Niederalpl Pass	Mürzsteg to Gußwerk	Austria	1221
	Lahnsattel	Mürzsteg to Mariazell	Austria	1006
	Ochsattel	Schwarzau im Gebirge to Hohenberg	Austria	820
	Kalte Kuchl	Schwarzau im Gebirge to Rohrbach an der Gölsen	Austria	728
	Gerichtsberg Pass	Altenmarkt an der Triesting to Hainfeld	Austria	581

=== Other passes ===
Detailed lists of passes are given by Alpine subdivision, see the following articles:

- Western Alps
  - Ligurian Alps
  - Maritime Alps
  - Cottian Alps
  - Dauphiné Alps
  - Graian Alps
  - Pennine Alps
  - Bernese Alps
  - Lepontine Alps
  - Tödi Range
  - North-Eastern Swiss Alps
- Eastern Alps
  - Northern Limestone Alps
    - The Alps of Bavaria, the Vorarlberg, and Salzburg
  - Central Eastern Alps
    - Bergamo Alps
    - Rhaetian Alps, including Bernina Range, Livigno Range, Sesvenna Range, Albula Range, Silvretta and Rätikon
    - Verwall Alps and Samnaun Alps
    - Tyrolean Alps, including Ötztal Alps, Stubai Alps, Kitzbühel Alps, Hohe Tauern and Zillertal Alps
    - Niedere Tauern
  - Southern Limestone Alps
    - Adamello-Presanella and Brenta Group
    - Ortler Alps
    - Dolomites
    - Carnic Alps
    - Julian Alps
    - Karawanks
    - Kamnik Alps

== Road tunnels ==
Main chain, from west to east:

name	location	countries	length (km)
Col de Tende Road Tunnel	Tende to Cuneo	France, Italy	3.2
Fréjus Road Tunnel	Modane to Susa	France, Italy	12.9
Mont Blanc Tunnel	Chamonix to Courmayeur	France, Italy	11.6
Great St Bernard Tunnel	Martigny to Aosta	Switzerland, Italy	5.9
St. Gotthard Tunnel	Göschenen to Airolo	Switzerland	17
San Bernardino Tunnel	Splügen to Bellinzona	Switzerland	7.7
Felbertauern Tunnel	Mittersill to Lienz	Austria	5.3
Tauern Road Tunnel	Eben im Pongau to Sankt Michael im Lungau	Austria	6.4

Notable other tunnels:

name	location	countries	length (km)
Arlberg Tunnel	Langen am Arlberg to St Anton am Arlberg	Austria	13.976
Karawanks Tunnel	Villach to Jesenice	Austria, Slovenia	7.864

== Railway passes and tunnels ==
Main chain, from west to east:

name	type	location	countries	length (km)	elevation (m)
Colle di Cadibona	pass	Savona to Ceva	Italy		436
Tunnel de Tende	tunnel	Tende to Cuneo	France, Italy	8.1	
Fréjus Rail Tunnel	tunnel	Modane to Susa	France, Italy	13.7	1123
Simplon Tunnel	tunnel	Brig to Domodossola	Switzerland, Italy	19.8	705
Gotthard Rail Tunnel	tunnel	Göschenen to Airolo	Switzerland	15	1151
Gotthard Base Tunnel	tunnel	Erstfeld to Biasca	Switzerland	57.1	549
Bernina Pass	pass	Pontresina to Tirano	Switzerland		2323
Brenner Pass	pass	Innsbruck to Sterzing	Austria, Italy		1370
Tauern Tunnel	tunnel	Bad Gastein to Obervellach	Austria	8.6	
Schober Pass	pass	Liezen to Leoben	Austria		849
Präbichl	pass	Eisenerz to Leoben	Austria		1204

Notable other railway passes and tunnels:

name	type	location	countries	length (km)	elevation (m)
Arlberg Railway Tunnel	tunnel	Langen am Arlberg to St Anton am Arlberg	Austria	10.6	1303
Karawanks Tunnel	tunnel	Villach to Jesenice	Austria, Slovenia	8.0	
Lötschberg Tunnel	tunnel	Spiez to Brig	Switzerland	14.6	1240
Lötschberg Base Tunnel	tunnel	Spiez to Brig	Switzerland	34.6	828
Oberalp Pass	pass	Andermatt to Disentis	Switzerland		2044
Semmering	tunnel	Gloggnitz to Mürzzuschlag	Austria	1.5	965

== History ==
Places where the Alps were crossed are called passes, and are points at which the alpine chain sinks to form depressions, up to which deep-cut valleys lead from the plains and hilly pre-mountainous zones. The oldest names for such passes are Mont (still retained in cases of Mont Cenis and Monte Moro), for it was many ages before this term was applied to mountains themselves, which with a few very rare exceptions (e.g. Monte Viso was known to the Romans as Vesulus) were for a long time disregarded.

Native inhabitants of the Alps were naturally the first to use the passes. The passes first became known to the outside world when the Romans crossed them to raid or conquer the region beyond. Romans, once having found an "easy" way across the chain, did not trouble to seek for harder and more devious routes. Hence, passes that can be shown as certainly known to them are relatively few in number: they are, in topographical order from west to east, the Maddalena Pass, the Col de Montgenèvre, the Col du Mont Cenis, the two St Bernard passes (Little St Bernard Pass and Great St Bernard Pass), the Splügen Pass, the Septimer Pass, the Reschen Pass, the Brenner Pass, the Plöcken Pass, the Pontebba Pass (or Saifnitz Pass), the Radstädter Tauern Pass and the Solkscharte Pass or Sölk Pass.

Of these the Montgenèvre and the Brenner were the most frequented. In the Central Alps only two passes (the Splügen and the Septimer) were certainly known to the Romans. In fact the central portion of the Alps was by far the least Romanised region until the early Middle Ages. Thus the Simplon is first definitely mentioned in 1235, the St Gotthard in 1236, the Lukmanier in 965, the San Bernardino in 941; of course they may have been known before, but authentic history is silent as regards them till the dates specified. Even the Mont Cenis (from the 15th to the 19th century the favourite pass for travellers going from France to Italy) is first heard of only in 756.

In the 13th century many hitherto unknown passes came into prominence, even some of the easy glacier passes. In the Western and Central Alps there is only one ridge to cross, to which access is gained by a deep-cut valley, though often it would be shorter to cross a second pass in order to reach the plains, e.g. the Montgenèvre, that is most directly reached by the Col du Lautaret; and the Simplon, which is best reached by one of the lower passes over the western portion of the Bernese Oberland chain. On the other hand, in the Eastern Alps, it is generally necessary to cross three distinct ridges between the northern and southern plains, the Central ridge being the highest and most difficult to cross. Thus the passes which crossed a single ridge, and did not involve too great a detour through a long valley of approach, became the most important and the most popular, e.g. the Mont Cenis, the Great St Bernard, the St Gotthard, the Septimer and the Brenner.

As time went on the Alpine passes were improved to make travel easier. A few passes (e.g. the Semmering, the Brenner, the Col de Tende and the Arlberg) had carriage roads constructed before 1800, while those over the Umbrail and the Great St Bernard were not completed till the early years of the 20th century. Most of the carriage roads across the great alpine passes were thus constructed in the first half of the 19th century, largely due to the Napoleon's need for such roads as modes of military transport. As late as 1905, the highest pass over the main chain that had a carriage road was the Great St Bernard (2,472 m (8,111 ft)), but three still higher passes over side ridges have roads—the col de l'Iseran, the Stelvio Pass (2,760 m (9,040 ft)), the Col du Galibier (2,658 m (8,721 ft)), in the Dauphiné Alps, and the Umbrail Pass (2,512 m (8,242 ft)).

Railway lines, like the Brenner and the Pontebba lines, were added to speed travel through the passes and tunnels supplemented passes at the Col de Tenda, the Mont Cenis, the Simplon and the St Gotthard.

== See also ==
- Alps
- List of highest paved roads in Europe
- List of mountain passes
- List of mountain passes in Switzerland
- Valleys of the Alps
