= Main chain of the Alps =

Central line of mountains that forms the divide of the Alps

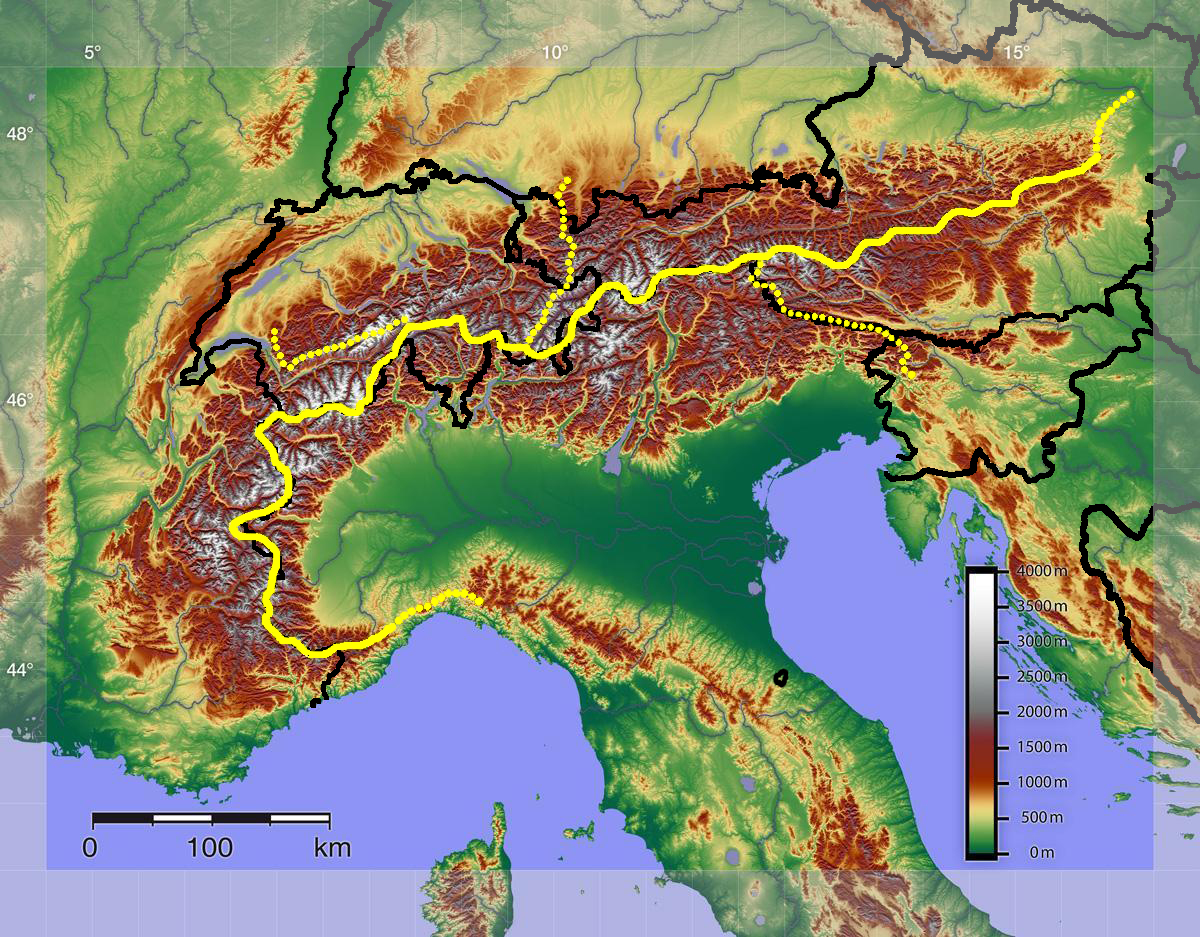
Main chain of the Alps

The main chain of the Alps, also called the Alpine divide is the central line of mountains that forms the drainage divide of the range. Main chains of mountain ranges are traditionally designated in this way, and generally include the highest peaks of a range. The Alps are something of an unusual case in that several significant groups of mountains are separated from the main chain by sizable distances. Among these groups are the Dauphiné Alps, the Eastern and Western Graians, the entire Bernese Alps, the Tödi, Albula and Silvretta groups, the Ortler and Adamello ranges, and the Dolomites of Veneto and South Tyrol, as well as the lower Alps of Vorarlberg, Bavaria, and Salzburg.

== Main features ==
The Alpine Divide is defined for much of its distance by the watershed between the drainage basin of the Po in Italy on one side, with the other side of the divide being formed by the Rhone, the Rhine and the Danube. Further east, the watershed is between the Adige and the Danube, before heading into Austria and draining on both sides into the Danube. For much of its distance the watershed lies on or close to the Italian border, although there are numerous deviations, notably, the Swiss canton of Ticino which lies south of the range in the Po river basin.

For only a small portion of its total distance does the Alpine divide form a part of the main European watershed, in the central section where the watershed is between the Po and the Rhine.

The Alps are generally divided into Eastern Alps and Western Alps, cut along a line between Lake Como and Lake Constance, following the Rhine valley.

- The Eastern Alps (main ridge elongated and broad) belong to Austria, Germany, Italy, Slovenia, and Switzerland.
- The Western Alps are higher, but their central chain is shorter and much curved; they are located in France, Italy, and Switzerland.

Piz Bernina (4,049 metres) is the highest peak of the Eastern Alps while the highest peak of the Western Alps is Mont Blanc (4,810.45 metres).

=== Eastern Alps ===
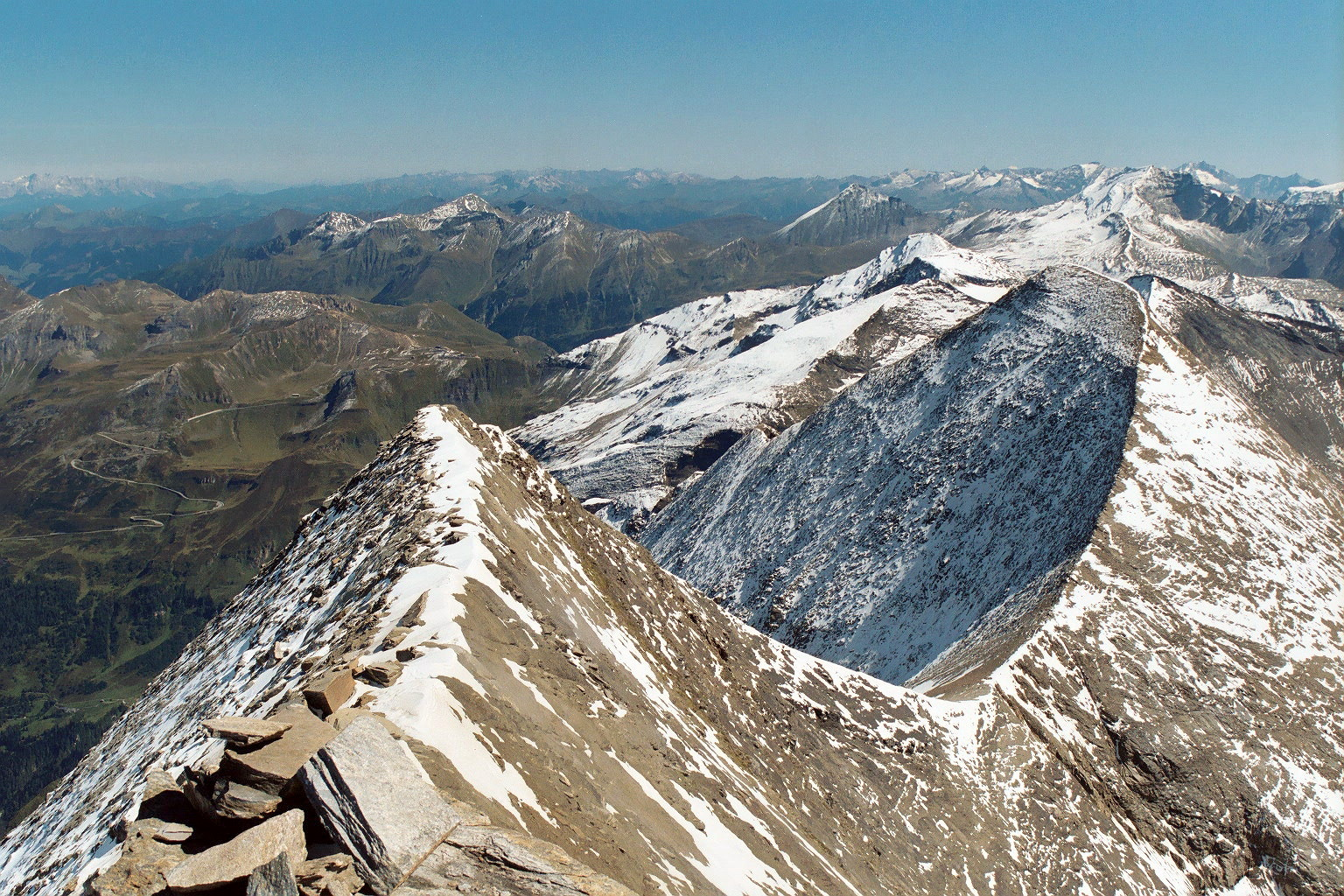
Main ridge (Fuscherkarkopf) in the Hohe Tauern range

From the Maloja Pass (1,815 m) the main watershed dips to the south-east for a short distance, and then runs eastwards and nearly over the highest summit of the Bernina Range, Piz Bernina (4,049 m), to the Bernina Pass. From here the main chain is less well defined, it rises to Piz Paradisin (3,302 m), beyond which it runs slightly north-east, east of the Italian resort of Livigno, past Fraele Pass (1,952 m) and the source of the Adda, traverses Piz Murtarol (3,180 m) and Monte Forcola, where is the tripoint between the Danube, Po and Adige basins, then falls to the Ofen Pass (2,149 m), soon heads north and rises once more in Piz Sesvenna (3,204 m).

The Reschen Pass (1,504 m) marks a break in the continuity of the Alpine chain. The deep valley, the Vinschgau of the upper Adige, is one of the most remarkable features in the orography of the Alps. The little Reschen Lake, which forms the chief source of the Adige, is only 4 metres below the Pass, and 8 km from the Inn valley. Eastward of this pass, the main chain runs north-east to the Brenner Pass along the snowy crest of the Ötztal, the highest point being the Weißkugel (3,739 m), then crossing the Timmelsjoch (2,474 m) and rising again in Stubai Alps. Both the highest summits of the Ötztal and the Stubai, the Wildspitze (3,774 m) and the Zuckerhütl (3,505 m), stand a little to the north.

The Brenner (1,370 m) is the lowest of all the great road passes across the core part of the main chain and has always been the chief means of communication between Germany and Italy. For some way beyond it, the watershed runs eastwards over the highest crest of the Zillertal Alps, which attains 3,510 metres in the Hochfeiler. But, a little farther, at the Dreiherrnspitze (3,499 m), the chain splits: the main watershed between the Black Sea and the Mediterranean heads south, along the Rieserferner Group to the Dolomites, and Julian Alps.

The main alpine divide head east, traversing the High Tauern range, crossing the Grossvenediger (3,666 m), passing just north of Austria's highest peak (the Grossglockner), traversing Ankogel (3,252 m), before curving northern across the Lower Tauern, traversing its highest peak, Hochgolling (2,863 m) in the Schladming Tauern and then continuing on the same eastward path up to the Schober Pass in Styria. The drainage divide further runs eastwards through the Northern Limestone Alps, ending at "Vienna Gate", the steep slopes of the Leopoldsberg (425 m) high above the Danube water gap and the Vienna Basin.

=== Western Alps ===
Starting from the Bocchetta di Altare or di Colle di Cadibona (west of Savona), the main chain extends first south-west, then north-west to the Col de Tenda, though nowhere rising much beyond the zone of coniferous trees. Beyond the Col de Tenda the direction is first roughly west, then north-west to the Rocca dei Tre Vescovi (2,840 m), just south of the Enciastraia (2,955 m), several peaks of about 3,000 metres rising on the watershed, though the highest of all, the Punta dell'Argentera (3,297 m) stands a little way to its north. From the Rocher des Trois Évêques the drainage divide runs due north for a long distance, though of the two loftiest peaks of this region one, the Aiguille de Chambeyron (3,412 m), is just to the west, and the other, the Monviso (3,841 m), is just to the east of the divide. From the head of the Val Pellice the main chain runs north-west and diminishes much in average height until it reaches the Mont Thabor (3,178 m), which forms the apex of a salient angle which the main chain here presents towards the west. From here the divide extends eastwards, culminating in the Aiguille de Scolette (3,505 m), but makes a great curve to the north-west and back to the south-east before rising in the Rocciamelone (3,509 m). From there the direction taken is north as far as the eastern summit (3,619 m) of the Levanna, the divide rising in a series of snowy peaks, though the loftiest point of the region, the Pointe de Charbonnel (3,760 m), stands a little to the west. Once more the chain bends to the north-west, rising in several lofty peaks (the highest is the Aiguille de la Grande Sassière, 3,751 m), before attaining the considerable depression of the Little St Bernard Pass.

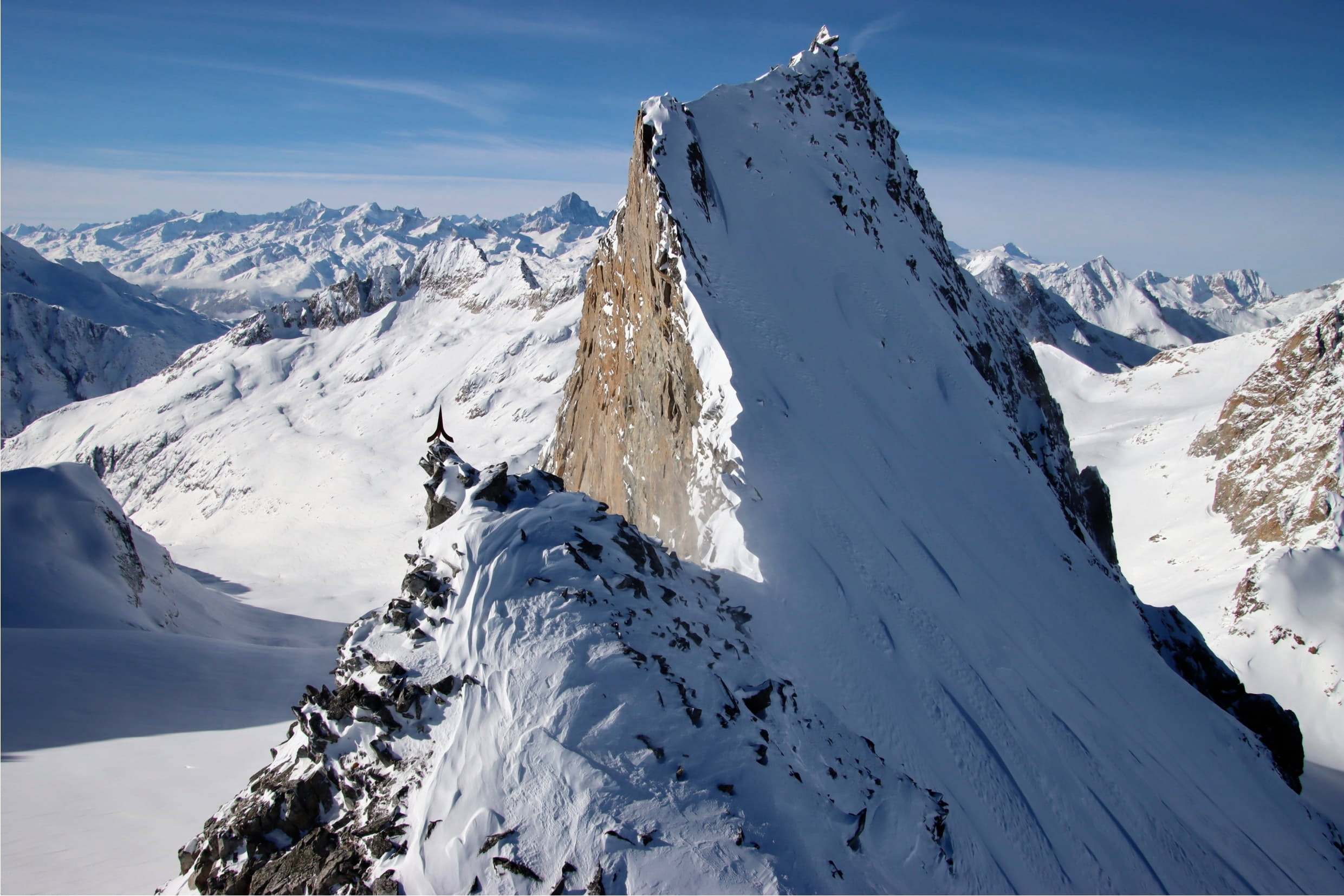
View of the Witenwasserenstock with the tripoint between the Rhone, Rhine, and Po basins (center left)

The divide then briefly turns north to the Col de la Soigne, and then north-east along the crest of the Mont Blanc chain, which culminates in the peak of Mont Blanc (4,810 m), the highest in the Alps. A number of high peaks line the divide, notably the Grandes Jorasses (4,208 m) before it reaches Mont Dolent (3,823 m), where France, Italy and Switzerland meet. From there, after a short dip to the south-east, the chain takes, near the Great St. Bernard Pass, a generally eastern direction that it maintains until it reaches Monte Rosa, where it bends northwards, making one small dip to the east to the Simplon Pass. It is in the portion of the watershed between the Grande St Bernard Pass and the Simplon that the main chain maintains a greater average height than in any other part. But, though it rises in a number of lofty peaks, such as the Mont Vélan (3,727 m), the Matterhorn (4,478 m), the Lyskamm (4,533 m), the Nord End of Monte Rosa (4,575 m), and the Weissmies (4,023 m), many of the highest points of the region, such as the Grand Combin (4,314 m), the Dent Blanche (4,357 m), the Weisshorn (4,505 m), the true summit or Dufourspitze (4,634 m) of Monte Rosa itself, and the Dom (4,545 m), all rise on its northern slope and not on the main chain. On the other hand, the chain between the Grande St Bernard and the Simplon sinks at barely half a dozen points below a level of 3,000 metres.

The Simplon Pass (1.994 m) corresponds to a change in the main chain: the peaks and passes are lower, but as far as the Splügenpass, all the highest summits rise on the divide. From there to the St. Gotthard pass (2,106 m) the divide runs north-east, crossing Monte Leone (3,533 m), and Pizzo Rotondo (3,192 m). Near the Witenwasserenstock is the point where the basin of the Po, the Rhine and the Rhone meet, and the European Watershed joins the Alpine divide. From the St. Gotthard to the Maloja the watershed between the basins of the Rhine and Po runs in a generally easterly direction. It goes over Passo del Lucomagno (1,915 m), across Scopi (3,200 m), Piz Medel (3,210 m) and Piz Terri (3,149 m), where it turns towards the south to the Rheinwaldhorn (3,402 m). Here the divide veers back east over the Vogelberg (3,220 m) to the San Bernardino Pass (2,067 m), then over the Pizzo Tambo (3,279 m), the Splügenpass (2,114 m) and Piz Timun (3,209 m). From here the divide heads south again to Pizzo Stella (3,163 m) and then east over Pizz Gallagiun (3,107 m), to where, near the Lunghin pass, it reaches the main triple divide of the Alps: where water can flow to the Atlantic, the Mediterranean or the Black Sea. The main European watershed leaves the Alpine divide here, heading north, while the divide continues east to the Maloja Pass (1,815 m).

== Glaciers ==
The main chain has more glaciers and eternal snow than the independent or external ranges. The longest of these were both 14.9 kilometres (9 1/4 miles) a century ago, the Mer de Glace at Chamonix (now 7.6 km or 4 3/4 mi) and the Gorner Glacier at Zermatt (now 12.5 km or 7 3/4 mi). In the Eastern Alps the longest glacier was the Pasterze Glacier (8.4 km or 5 1/4 mi in 1911), which is not near the true main watershed, though it clings to the slope of the Grossglockner (3,798 m) in the Hohe Tauern range east of the Dreiherrenspitze. But two other long glaciers in the Eastern Alps (the Hintereis, and the Gepatsch) are both in the Ötztal Alps, and so are close to the true main watershed.

== Major Passes ==
| Name | Height | Countries | Traversed by | Remarks |
|---|---|---|---|---|
| Colle di Cadibona | 436m | (Italy) | Strada Provinciale 81 di Vallenzona | Pass separates Alps from Apennine Mountains. |
| Colle del Melogno | 1028m | (Italy) | Strada Statale 490 del Colle del Melogno | |
| Colle San Bernardo | 957m | (Italy) | Strada Statale 582 del Colle di San Bernardo | |
| Passo di Prale | 1258m | (Italy) | Strada Provinciale 216 | Passes border between Italian regions of Piemont and Liguria. |
| Colle di Nava | 934m | (Italy) | Strada Statale 28 del Colle di Nava | |
| Colle San Bernardo di Mendatica | 1262m | (Italy) | Strada Provinciale 74; Strada Provinciale 100 | |
| Col de Tende | 1870m | (France) (Italy) | Route nationale 204; Strada Statale 20 del Colle di Tenda e di Valle Roja | The Col de Tende Road Tunnel opened in 1882 runs under the pass. |
| Col de la Lombarde | 2351m | (France) (Italy) | Route départementale 97; Strada Provinciale 255 | |
| Col de Larche | 1991m | (France) (Italy) | Route départementale 900; Strada Statale 21 della Maddalena | |
| Col Agnel | 2744m | (France) (Italy) | Route départementale 205; Strada Provinciale 251 | |
| Col de Montgenèvre | 1860m | (France) | Route nationale 94 | |
| Col du Mont Cenis | 2081m | (France) | Route nationale 6 | |
| Little St Bernard Pass | 2188m | (France) (Italy) | Route nationale 90; Strada Statale 26 della Valle d’Aosta | |
| Great St Bernard Pass | 2469m | (Italy) (Switzerland) | Strada Statale 27 del Gran San Bernardo; Hauptstrasse 21 | The Great St Bernard Tunnel opened in 1964 runs under the pass. |
| Simplon Pass | 2006m | (Switzerland) | Hauptstrasse 9 | |
| Nufenen Pass | 2478m | (Switzerland) | | Passes border between Swiss cantons of Ticino and Valais. |
| Gotthard Pass | 2106m | (Switzerland) | Hauptstrasse 2 | |
| Lukmanier Pass | 1917m | (Switzerland) | Hauptstrasse 416 | Passes border between Swiss cantons of Grisons and Ticino. The Gotthard Base Tunnel opened in 2016 runs under the pass. |
| San Bernardino Pass | 2066m | (Switzerland) | Hauptstrasse 13 | The San Bernardino Tunnel opened in 1967 runs under the pass. |
| Splügen Pass | 2114m | (Italy) (Switzerland) | Strada Statale 36 del Lago di Como e dello Spluga; Hauptstrasse 567 | |
| Maloja Pass | 1812m | (Switzerland) | Hauptstrasse 3 | |
| Bernina Pass | 2328m | (Switzerland) | Hauptstrasse 29; Bernina railway line | |
| Livigno Pass | 2315m | (Italy) (Switzerland) | | |
| Foscagno Pass | 2291m | (Italy) | Strada Statale 301 | |
| Fuorn Pass | 2149m | (Switzerland) | Hauptstrasse 28 | |
| Reschen Pass | 1504m | (Austria) (Italy) | Reschenstraße; Strada Statale 40 di Resia | |
| Timmelsjoch | 2474m | (Austria) (Italy) | Timmelsjoch-Hochalpenstraße; Strada Statale 44 bis Passo del Rombo | |
| Brennerpass | 1370m | (Austria) (Italy) | Brenner Autobahn; Brennerstraße; Autostrada A22; Strada Statale 12 dell'Abetone e del Brennero; Brenner Railway | |
| Hochtor | 2504m | (Austria) | Großglockner-Hochalpenstraße | Passes border between Austrian states of Carinthia and Salzburg. |
| Radstädter Tauern Pass | 1738m | (Austria) | Katschberg Straße | |
| Triebener Tauern Pass | 1274m | (Austria) | Triebener Straße | |
| Schober Pass | 849m | (Austria) | Pyhrn Autobahn; Schoberpass Straße; Rudolf Railway | |
| Präbichl | 1226m | (Austria) | Landesstraße 115 | |
| Lahn Saddle | 1006m | (Austria) | Lahnsattel Straße | |
| Ochsattel | 820m | (Austria) | Gutensteiner Straße | |
| Gerichtsberg Pass | 581m | (Austria) | Hainfelder Straße | |
| Klammhöhe | 618m | (Austria) | | |
| Riederberg (Wienerwald) | 384m | (Austria) | | |

== See also ==
- Alps
  - Eastern Alps
  - Western Alps
- Geography of the Alps
- High Alps
