= Kleiner Semmering Pass =

Mountain pass in Austria

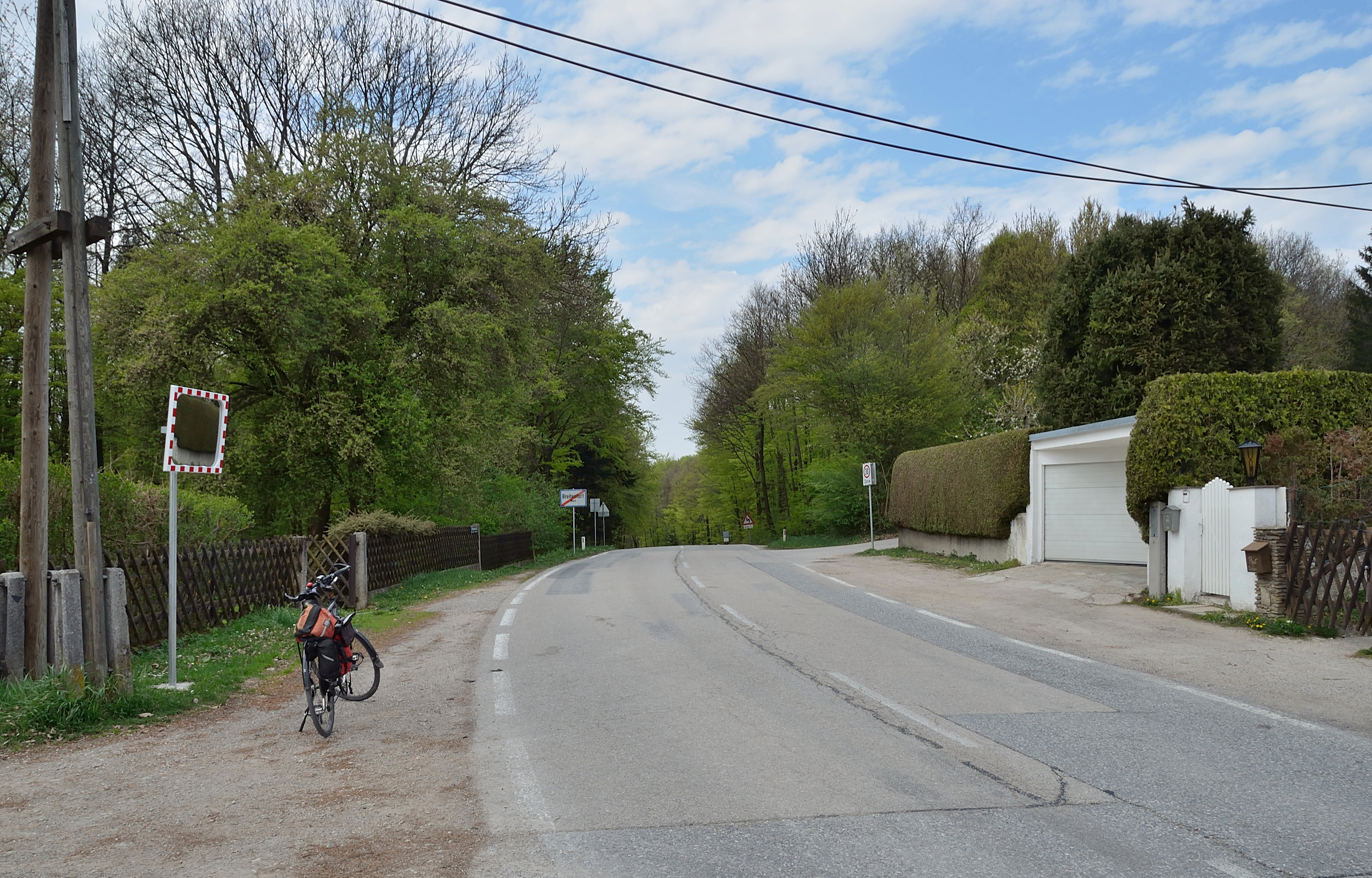
- Summit of the pass

- Location within Alps
- Elevation: 463 metres (1,519 ft)

Third Approach
- Location: Austria
- Range: Alps
- Coordinates: 48°8′39″N 16°7′35″E

Kleiner Semmering Pass (el. 463 m [1,519 ft]) is a low mountain pass in the Wienerwald in the Bundesland of Lower Austria.

It forms the divide between the watersheds of the Vienna River and the Liesingbach.

== See also ==
- List of highest paved roads in Europe
- List of mountain passes
