= Pizzo Pesciora =

Mountain in Switzerland

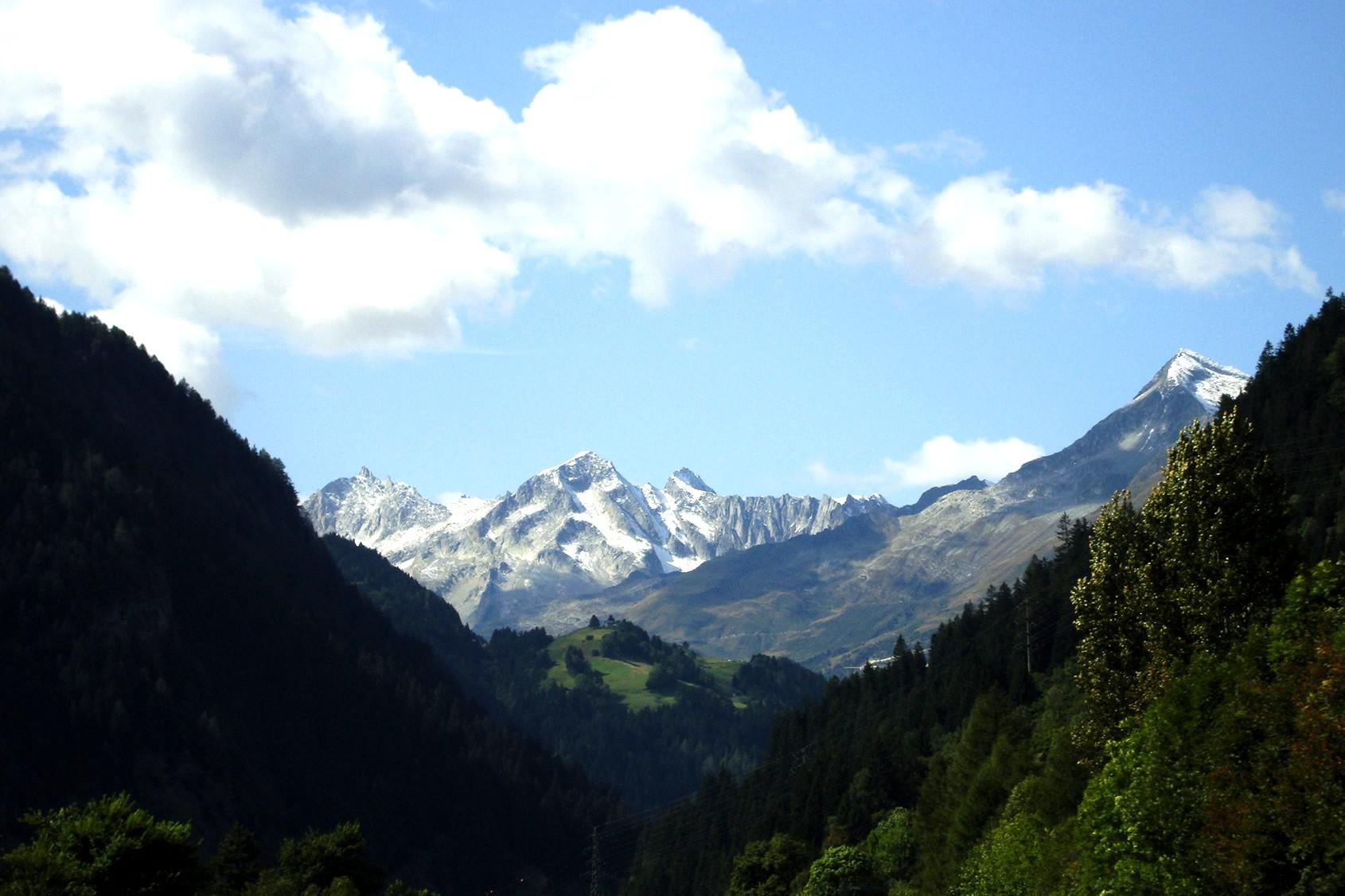
- Pizzo Pesciora (centre left) between Pizzo Rotondo and Witenwasserenstock

Highest point
- Elevation: 3,120 m (10,240 ft)
- Prominence: 135 m (443 ft)
- Parent peak: Pizzo Rotondo
- Coordinates: 46°31′29.2″N 8°28′39.7″E

Geography
- Location within Switzerland
- Location: Valais/Ticino, Switzerland
- Parent range: Lepontine Alps

Pizzo Pesciora (or Poncione di Pesciora) is a mountain in the Lepontine Alps, located on the border between the Swiss cantons of Valais and Ticino. It lies north of Bedretto, on the ridge between the Witenwasserenstock and Pizzo Rotondo.
