= Chüebodenhorn =

Mountain in Switzerland

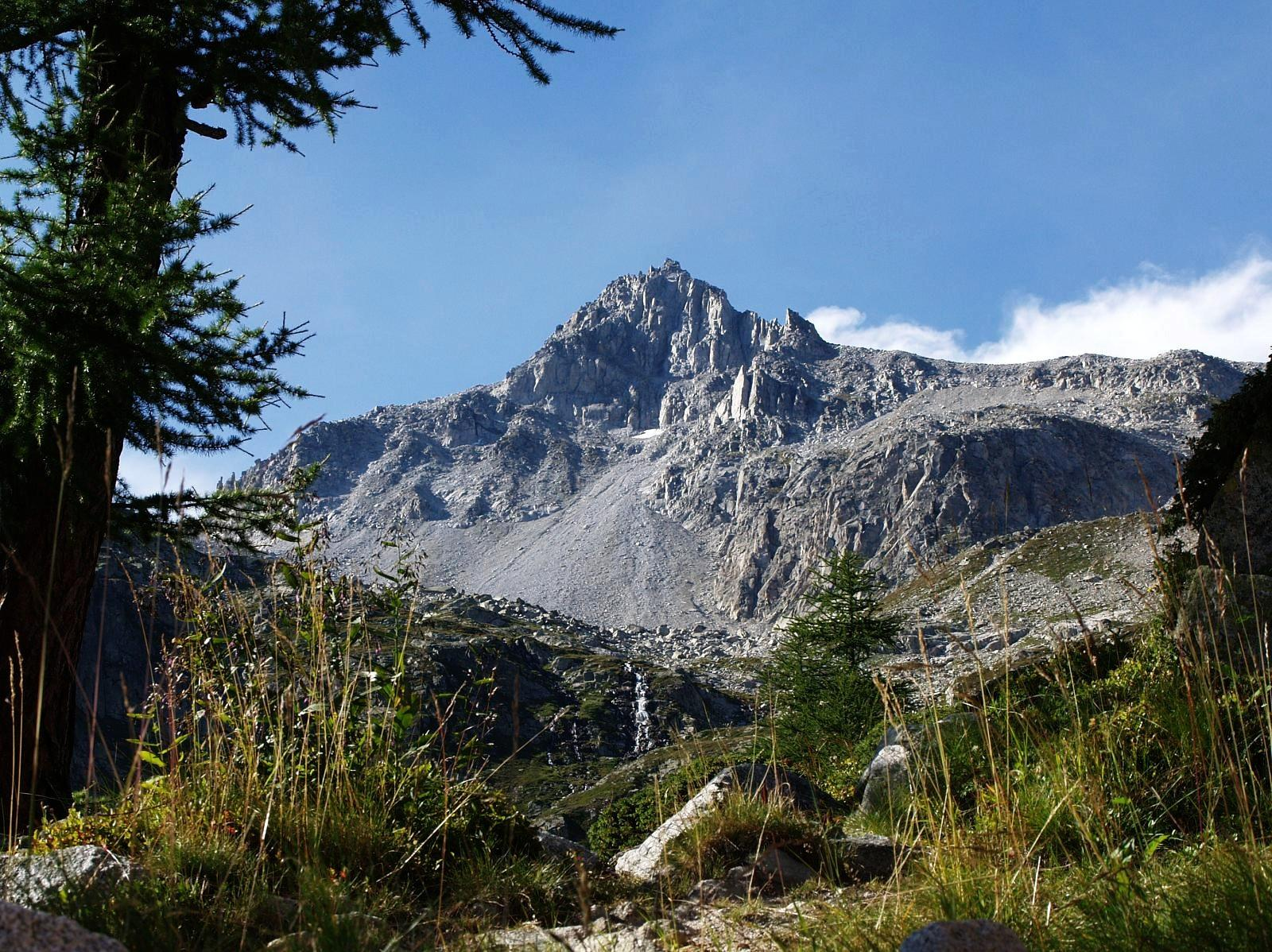
- The south side of Chüebodenhorn

Highest point
- Elevation: 3,070 m (10,070 ft)
- Prominence: 316 m (1,037 ft)
- Parent peak: Pizzo Rotondo
- Listing: Alpine mountains above 3000 m
- Coordinates: 46°30′29.2″N 8°27′11.1″E

Geography
- Location within Switzerland
- Location: Ticino/Valais, Switzerland
- Parent range: Lepontine Alps

The Chüebodenhorn is a 3,070 metres high mountain in the Lepontine Alps, located on the border between the cantons of Valais and Ticino. It is situated south of Passo di Rotondo (2,754 metres), where a glacier named Ghiacciaio del Pizzo Rotondo lies at the foot of its north face. The south side (Ticino) overlooks the valley of Bedretto.
