= Gerichtsberg Pass =

Mountain pass in Lower Austria

- Location within Alps
- Elevation: 581 m (1,906 ft)
- Traversed by: Federal Highway B 18

Third Approach
- Location: Austria
- Range: Alps
- Coordinates: 48°1′47″N 15°51′27″E

Gerichtsberg Pass (el. 581 m [1,906 ft]) is a low mountain pass near to Hainfeld in the Austrian Alps in the Bundesland of Lower Austria.

It connects the Triesting river valley and the Gölsen river valley.

It forms the watershed of the Viennese Basin and the Traisen Valley on both sides dewatering to the Danube. In the winter, it can be an important obstacle to traffic, despite the fact that it is not very high.

It is part of the Via Sacra, the pilgrim road from Vienna to Mariazell. It is used as a shortcut between the west Autobahn to Salzburg and the Vienna beltway heading south. For this reason, it has been closed to trucks, except for local traffic.

In the 21st century, it has a ski resort.

== See also ==
- List of highest paved roads in Europe
- List of mountain passes
