= Colle San Bernardo di Mendatica =

Mountain pass in Italy

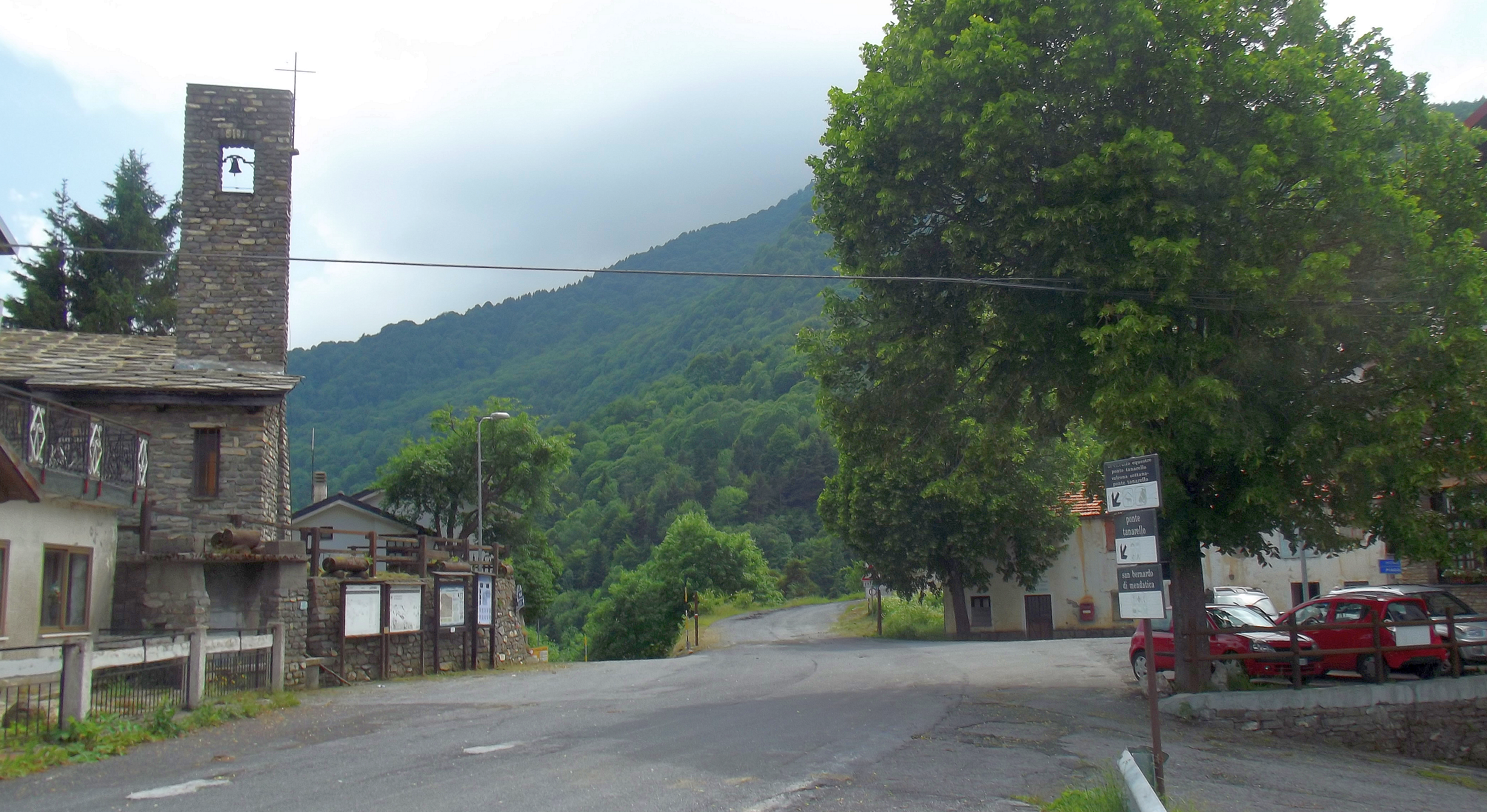

- Location within Alps
- Elevation: 1,262 metres (4,140 ft).
- Traversed by: Provincial roads 74, 100, 2

Third Approach
- Location: Liguria, Italy
- Range: Ligurian Alps
- Coordinates: 44°05′06″N 7°46′59″E

Colle San Bernardo di Mendatica (1262 m) is a mountain pass in the Province of Imperia (Italy). It connects Colle di Nava with Mendatica, Colla del Garezzo and Monesi (Triora), all located in the Province of Imperia.

== Geography ==
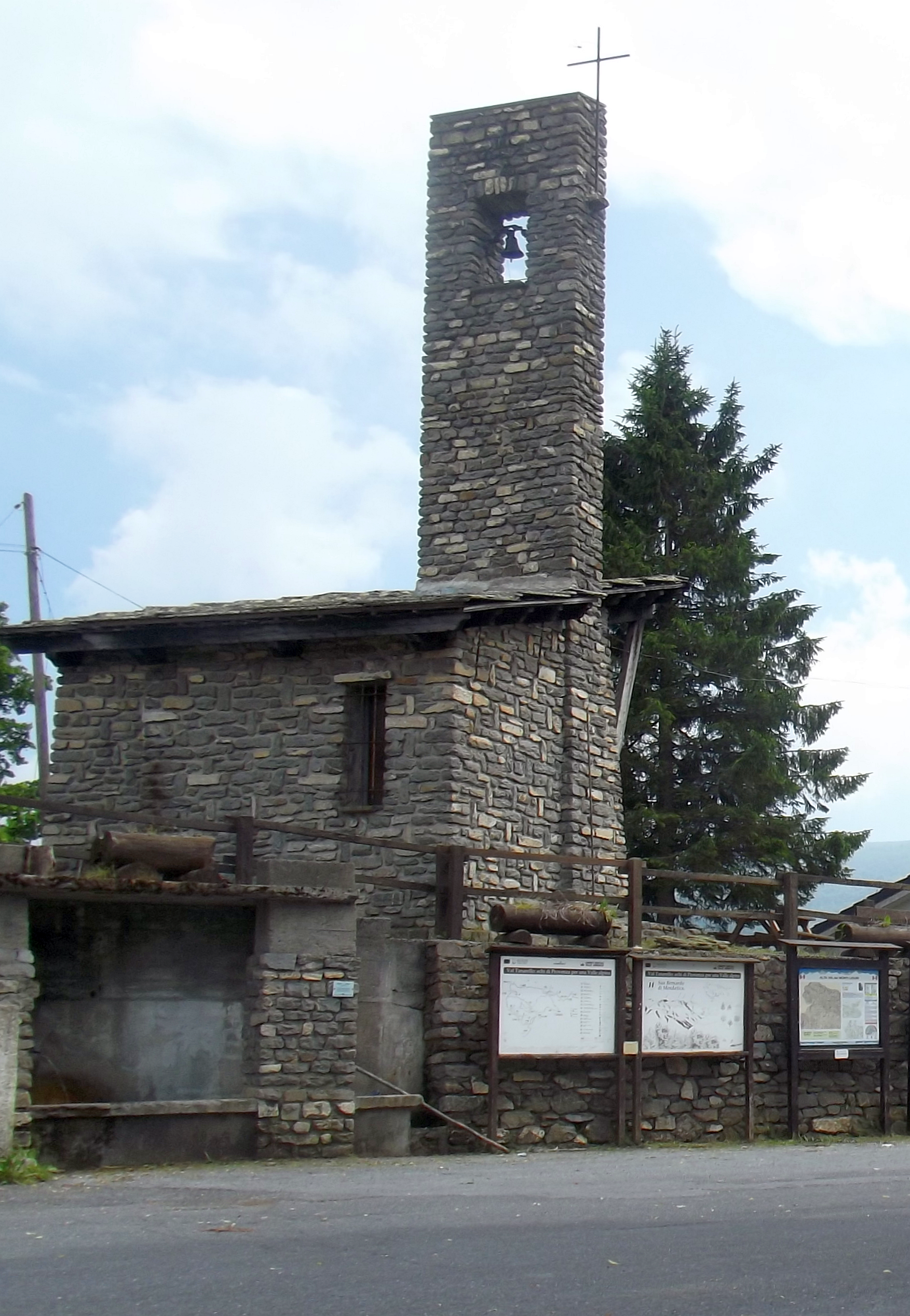
The church

Colle San Bernardo di Mendatica is located on the main chain of the Alps. It connects the basins of Ligurian Sea (south of the pass) and Po. Administratively it belongs to Mendatica municipality.

Near the pass is located a small touristic village with several holiday houses, some hotels, restaurants and a small church.

== Hiking ==
The pass is also accessible by off-road mountain paths and is crossed by the Alta Via dei Monti Liguri, a long-distance trail from Ventimiglia (province of Imperia) to Bolano (province of La Spezia).

== See also ==
- List of mountain passes
