= Vienna Woods =

Forested highlands in Vienna

- Wienerwald
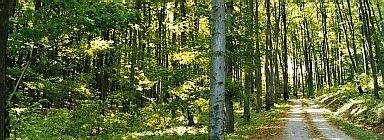
- Vienna Woods near Breitenfurt

Highest point
- Peak: Schöpfl
- Elevation: 893 m (2,930 ft)
- Coordinates: 48°05′14″N 015°54′43″E

Dimensions
- Length: 45 km (28 mi)
- Width: 20–30 km (12–19 mi)

Geography
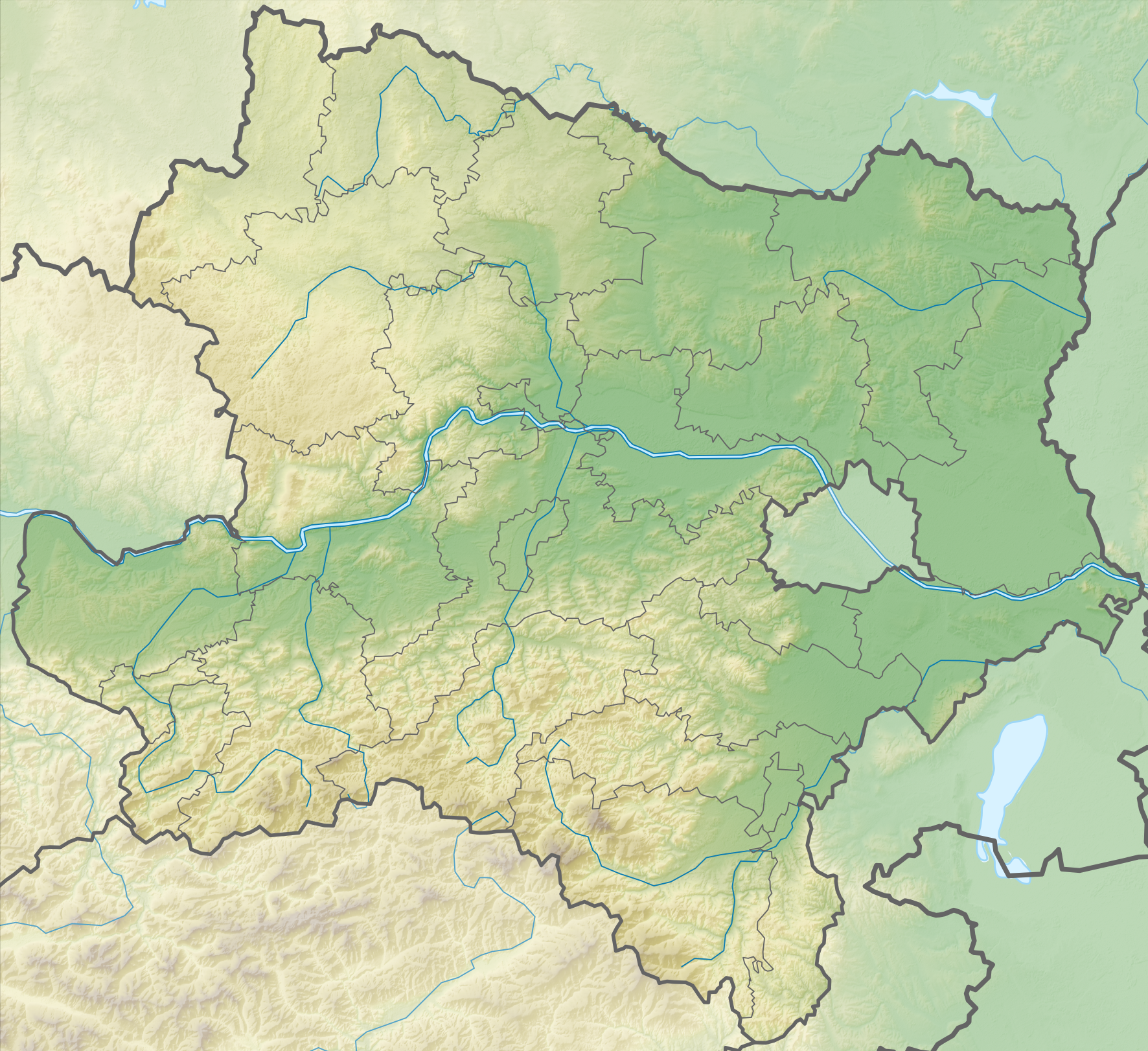
- Location within Lower Austria Location within Austria
- Country: Austria
- States: Lower Austria; Vienna
- Range coordinates: 48°10′N 16°00′E
- Parent range: Northern Limestone Alps

The Vienna Woods (German: Wienerwald, pronounced [ˈviːnɐˌvald]) are forested highlands that form the northeastern foothills of the Northern Limestone Alps in the states of Lower Austria and Vienna. The 45-kilometre-long (28 mi) and 20–30-kilometre-wide (12–19 mi) range of hills is heavily wooded and a popular recreation area with the Viennese.

== Location ==
The Vienna Woods are bounded by the rivers Triesting, Gölsen, Traisen and Danube, and are on the border of the Mostviertel and the Industrieviertel, two of the four quarters of Lower Austria. Reaching into the city of Vienna itself, they are a favourite outdoor destination for the densely populated area around the city.

== Geography ==
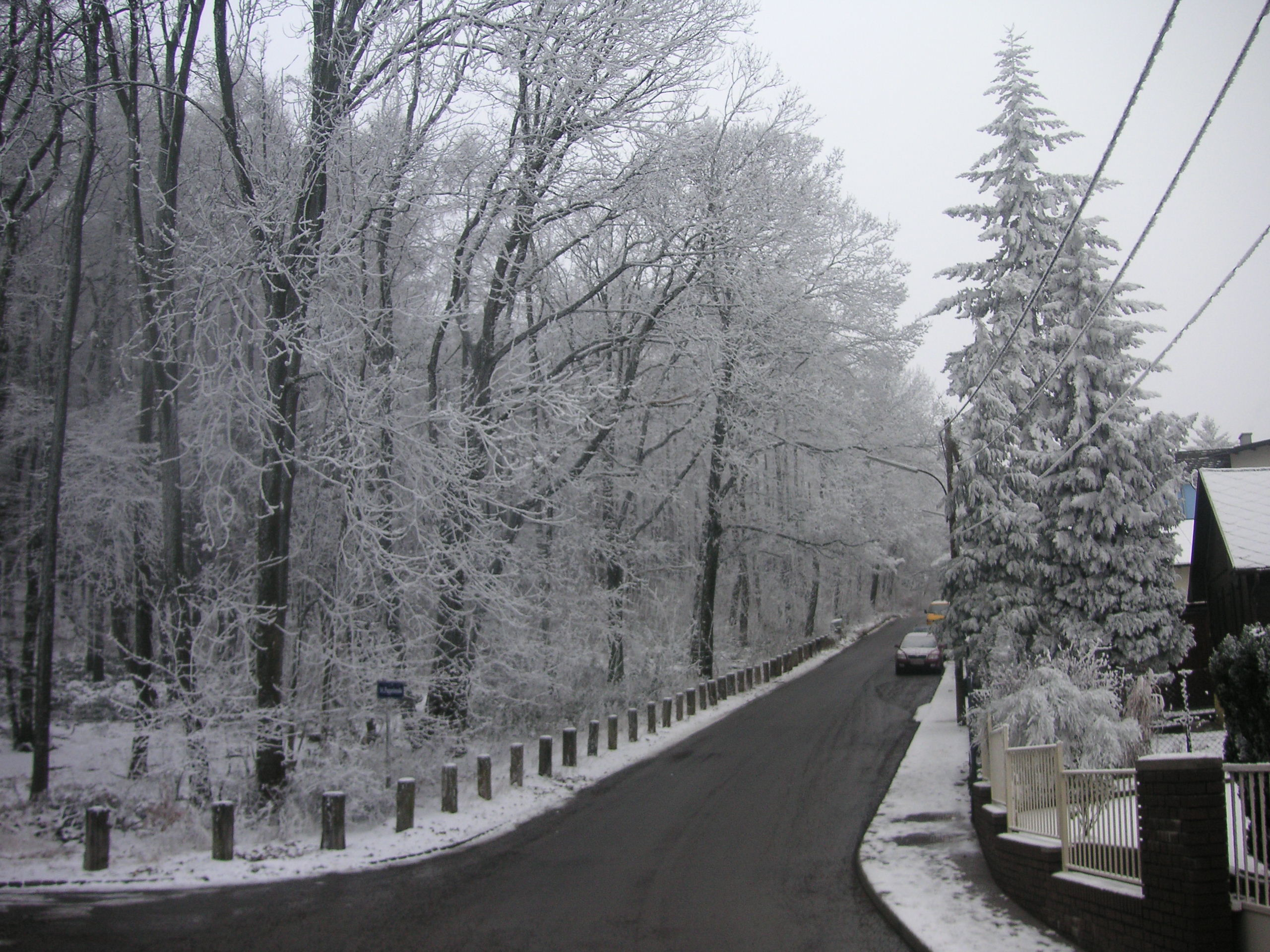
Pappelstraße in Vienna's 14th district, Penzing, a residential area bordering the Wienerwald

The highest elevation in the Vienna Woods is Schöpfl at 893 metres (2,930 ft) above sea level, the location of the Leopold Figl observatory. Important rivers in the Vienna Woods are the Wien, Schwechat and Triesting. The northeasternmost Leopoldsberg overlooking the Danube and the Vienna Basin forms the eastern end of the Alpine chain.

Even though the Vienna Woods are a protected landscape and important recreational area, they are threatened by urban sprawl. The Lainzer Tiergarten, an extensive park populated by wild boar and other woodland animals, as well as the Schwarzenbergpark, were created on the territory of the city of Vienna during the 19th century. The natural park Sandstein-Wienerwald is near Purkersdorf, some 20 km (12 mi) west of Vienna. There are also some caves, such as the Dreidärrischenhöhle ("cave of the three deaf men").

== Geology ==
The mountain ranges of the Vienna Woods are the transition between the Eastern Alps and the Carpathians, separated by the Danube and some tectonic lines near Vienna. The northern area is part of the Alps' sandstone zone, while its south is part of the Northern Limestone Alps. In the east, the border is the thermal line, which forms a geological break line to the Viennese Basin. Beeches, oaks and hornbeams grow throughout the north of the Wienerwald forest; in the south are conifers, mostly pines and firs. The Föhrenberge (Pine Mountains) natural park is in the latter region.

== History ==
The Vienna Woods was the royal hunting grounds from the 11th century until 1850. Under the influence of the Avars, a Slavic population settled here after the Völkerwanderung, which may account for village names such as Döbling, Liesing or Gablitz. From the 16th century onwards forestry was practised. Industrial development beginning circa 1840 encouraged increased settlement of the area.

Through the northern part of the Vienna Woods (from Tulln an der Donau), a march of Polish troops of King Jan III Sobieski took place, which were to help Vienna in September 1683.

In 1870, plans were brought forward to clear most of the forest, but this caused widespread public resistance, in which Josef Schöffel was one of the most important figures. In 1987, the governors of the states of Vienna, Lower Austria and Burgenland signed the Vienna Woods Declaration to protect nature in the region.

== See also ==
- "Tales from the Vienna Woods", a waltz by Johann Strauss II, as well as a play by Ödön von Horváth, and several film adaptations of the play
