= Gölsen =

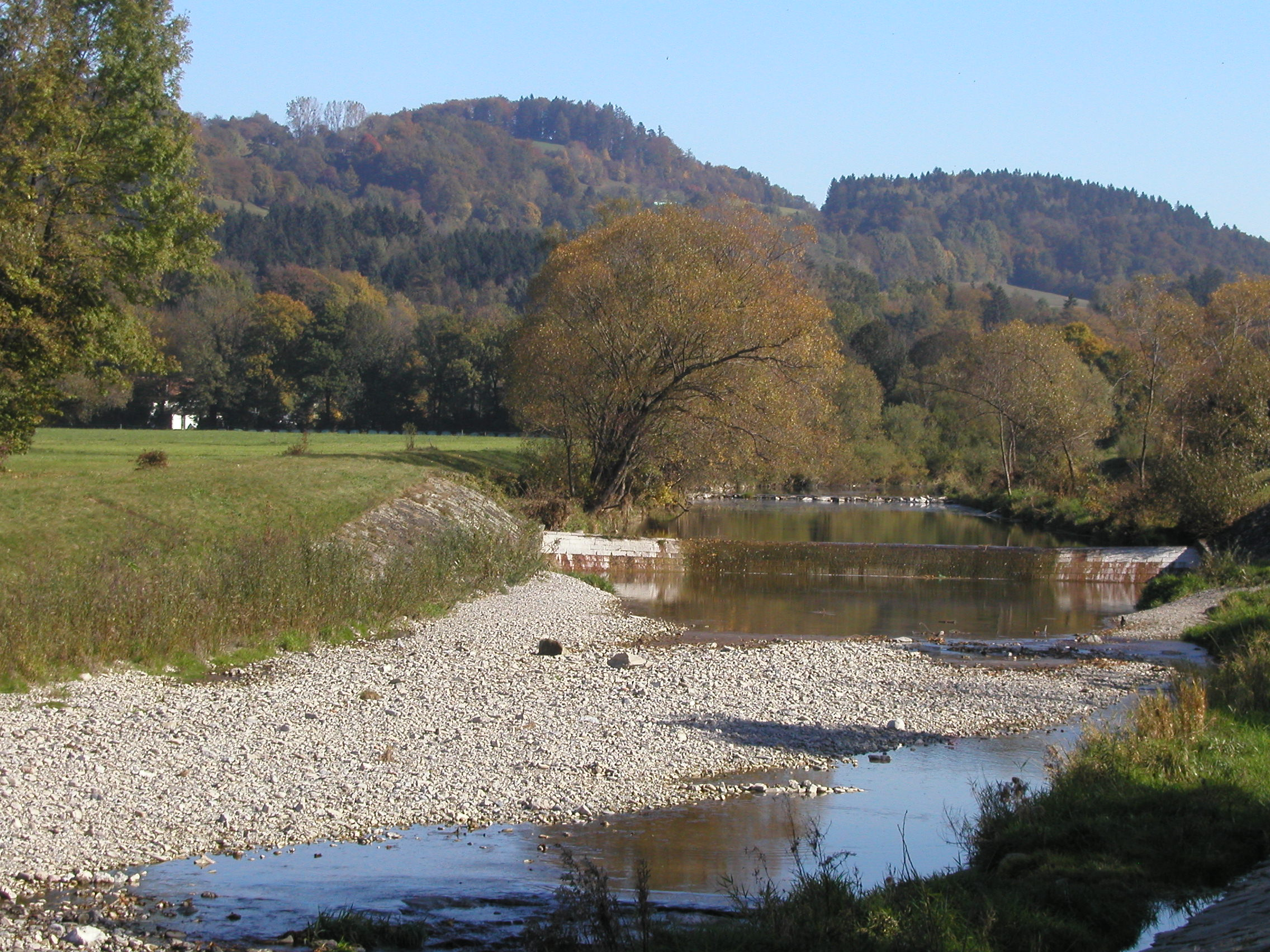
- The gravel banks of the Gölsen

Location
- Country: Austria
- State: Lower Austria

Physical characteristics
- Source
  - location: Hainfeld
  - elevation: 439 m (1,440 ft)
- Mouth
  - location: The Traisen River at Traisen.
  - coordinates: 48.0520°N 15.6120°E
- Length: 15.7 km (9.8 mi)
- Basin size: 297 km^{2} (115 sq mi)

Basin features
- Progression: Traisen→ Danube→ Black Sea

The Gölsen is a river in Lower Austria, in the Mostviertel. It is a right tributary of the Traisen. Its drainage basin is 297 km^{2} (115 sq mi).

The river begins in Hainfeld with the confluence of the Fliedersbach and the Ramsaubach (also called the Innere Gölsen). It then flows through the communities of Hainfeld, Rohrbach an der Gölsen, and Sankt Veit an der Gölsen, before discharging into the Traisen at Traisen. The Gölsen flows in an east-west direction and is around 15 km (9.3 mi) long, it has a difference in elevation of 80 metres (260 ft).

The river is nowadays heavily obstructed due to its recurring floods (Gölsen Dam, On account of its recurrent floods, the Gölsen is nowadays carefully controlled (the Gölsen Dam, river bed steps). However, within its broad riverbed, it can form gravel banks.

Parallel to the river runs the so-called Gölsentalradweg ("Gölsen valley bike trail"), which runs from the Traisentalradweg to Hainfeld. An extension of the path to the Triesting Valley Cycle Way is planned.

Parallel to the river, the so-called Gölsentalradweg ("Gölsen valley bike trail") was laid out, which runs continuously on asphalt from the Traisentalradweg to Hainfeld and then on into the valley of the Triesting to the Triestingtalradweg.

Along the Gölsen runs a rail line, the Leobersdorf railway from Traisen to Hainfeld. In the past, the line was longer and continued to Kaumberg and farther into the Triesting valley. Since 2004, however, only special trains have operated on this section of line.

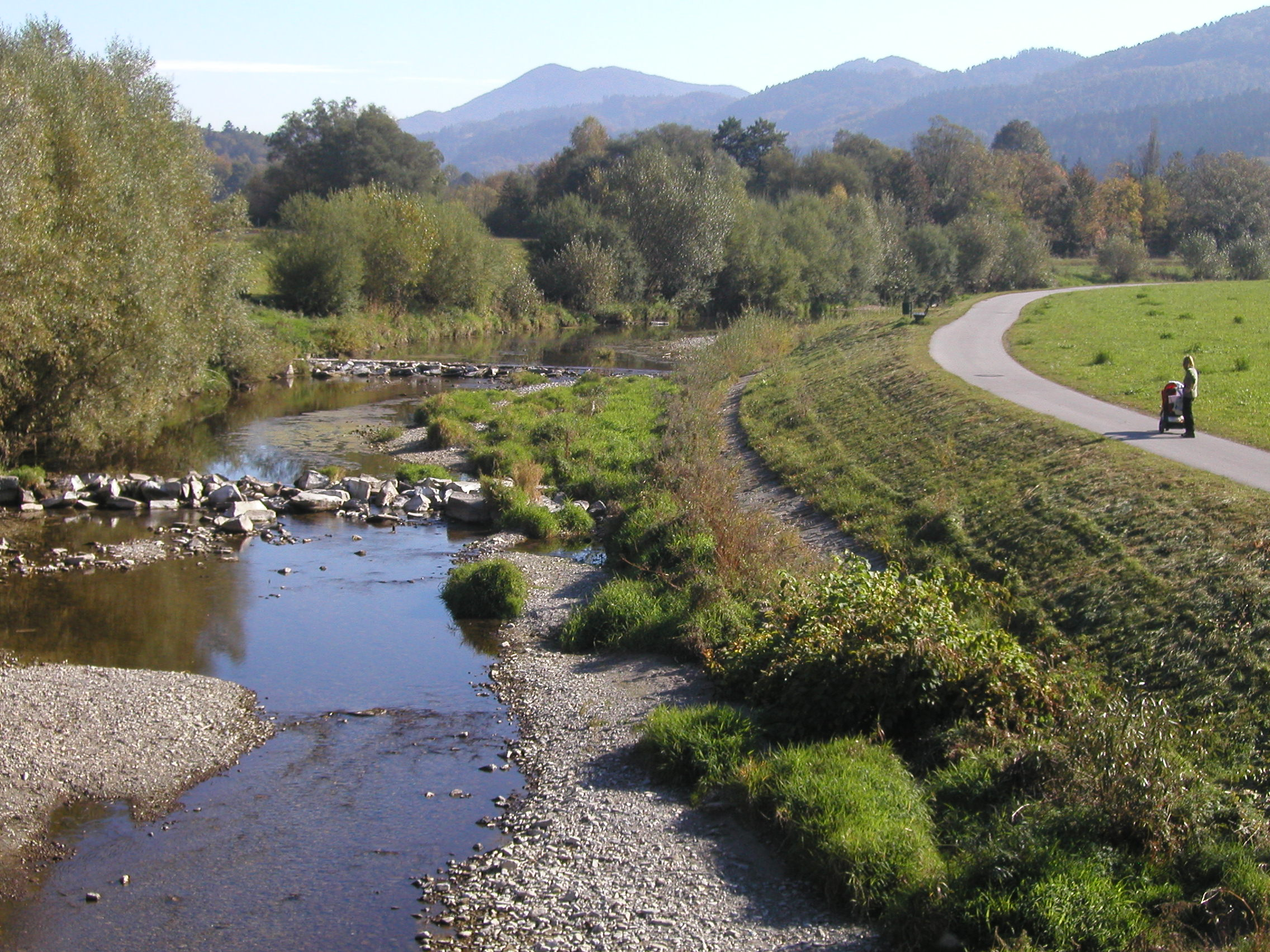
The Gölsen at Wiesenfeld

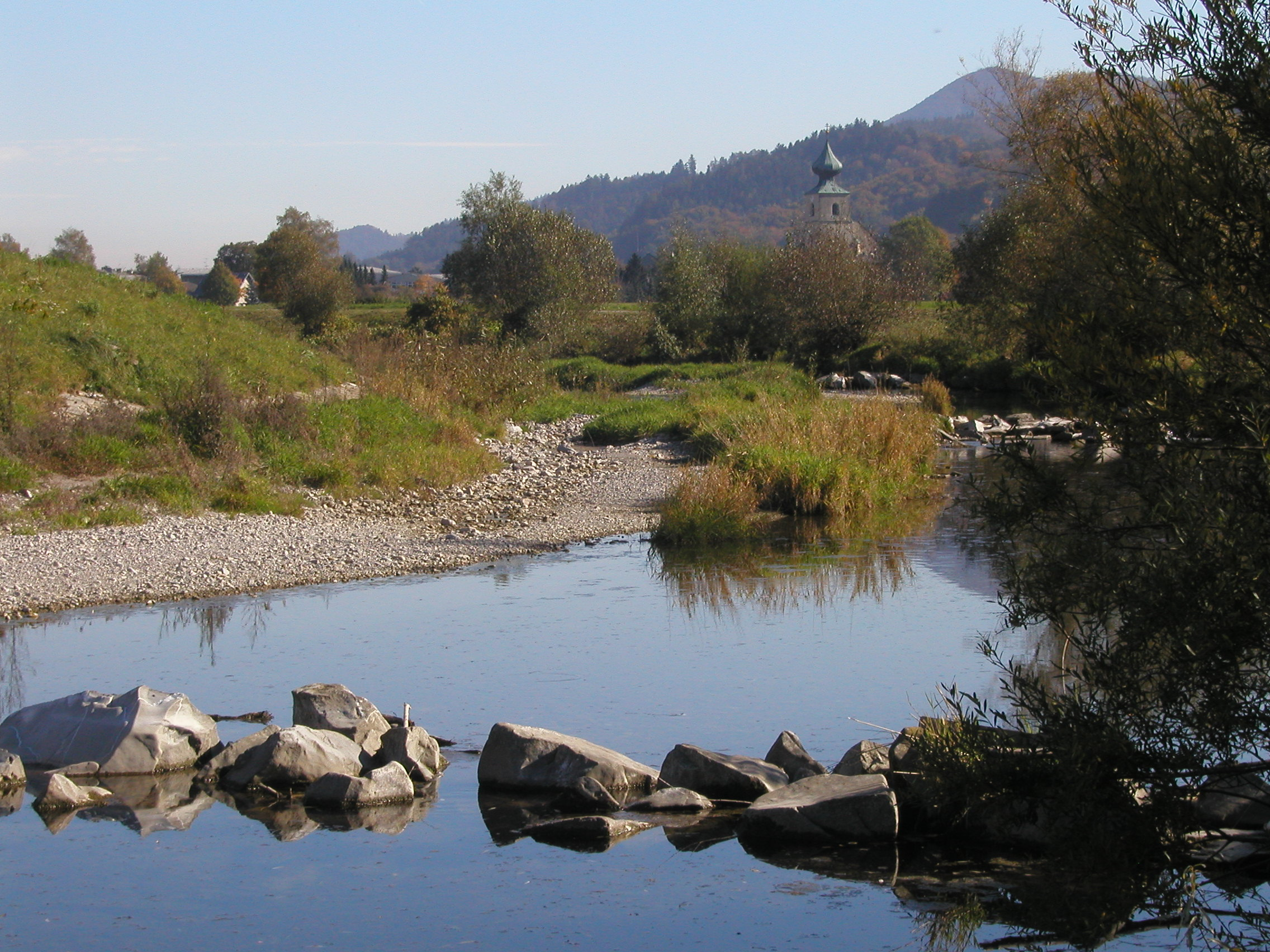
The Gölsen at Sankt Veit
