= Triesting =

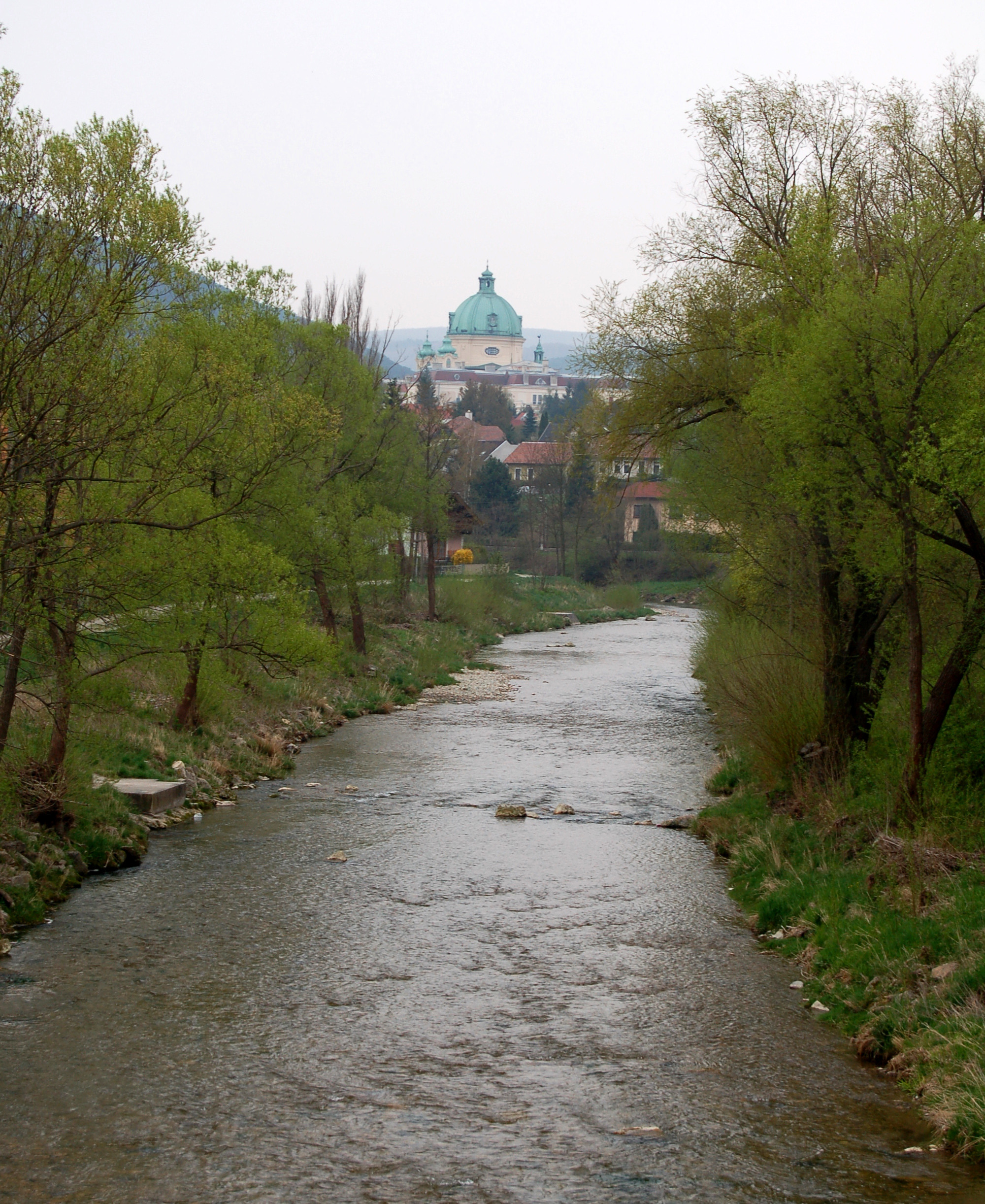
- The Triesting near Berndorf (with St. Margaret's Church)

Location
- Country: Austria
- State: Lower Austria

Physical characteristics
- Source
  - location: East of the Klammhöhe, northwest of Kaumberg in the Vienna Woods
  - coordinates: 48°04′06″N 15°52′20″E
  - elevation: 618 m (AA)
- Mouth
  - location: Near Achau into the Schwechat
  - coordinates: 48°04′52″N 16°23′57″E
  - elevation: 172 m (AA)
- Length: 63.5 km (39.5 mi)
- Basin size: 388 km^{2} (150 sq mi)

Basin features
- Progression: Schwechat→ Danube→ Black Sea
- Landmarks: Small towns: Berndorf, Schwechat; Villages: Kaumberg, Altenmarkt, Weissenbach, Pottenstein, Hirtenberg, Enzesfeld, Leobersdorf, Trumau, Münchendorf, Oberwaltersdorf
- Tributaries
  - right: Further Bach

The Triesting (Austrian German pronunciation: [ˈtriːstɪŋ]) is a river of Lower Austria, in the southeastern part of the Vienna Woods. Its drainage basin is 388 km^{2} (150 sq mi).

The Triesing has a length of 63 km (39 mi). It discharges into the smaller Schwechat at Achau and is part of the catchment area of the River Danube.

== Floods ==
- 1846
- July 1882
- May 1940
- July 1944
- July 1966
- July 1991 (flood wave only in the upper reaches)
- August 1997
- June 2002
- September 2024

The floods of 1944 were the worst ever in the Triesting valley. On 4 July 1944, there were severe floods, following heavy cloudbursts over the upper Triesting valley, in the vicinity of the Schöpfl mountain and in the Further valley. The narrow neck of the valley above Pottenstein was blocked by driftwood and the Fahrafeld Basin turned into a dammed lake. The dam broke and floodwaters up to 2 metres high surged through the valley. In the whole valley 188 people lost their lives, "the majority being foreign workers". (Note: The lower Triesting valley, in particular, was a centre of the armaments industry, in which a considerable number of foreign workers were used to replace those liable for military wartime service. The majority of foreigners used for this work were slave labourers: POWs of various nationalities, "transferees" from the East and the Balkans, "which had been occupied during the war by the German Wehrmacht" (Rieck, p. 147).)

== Sources ==
- Rieck, Walter (1957). Kulturgeographie des Triestingtales. Vienna, Univ., Diss.
