= Witenwasserenstock =

Mountain in Switzerland

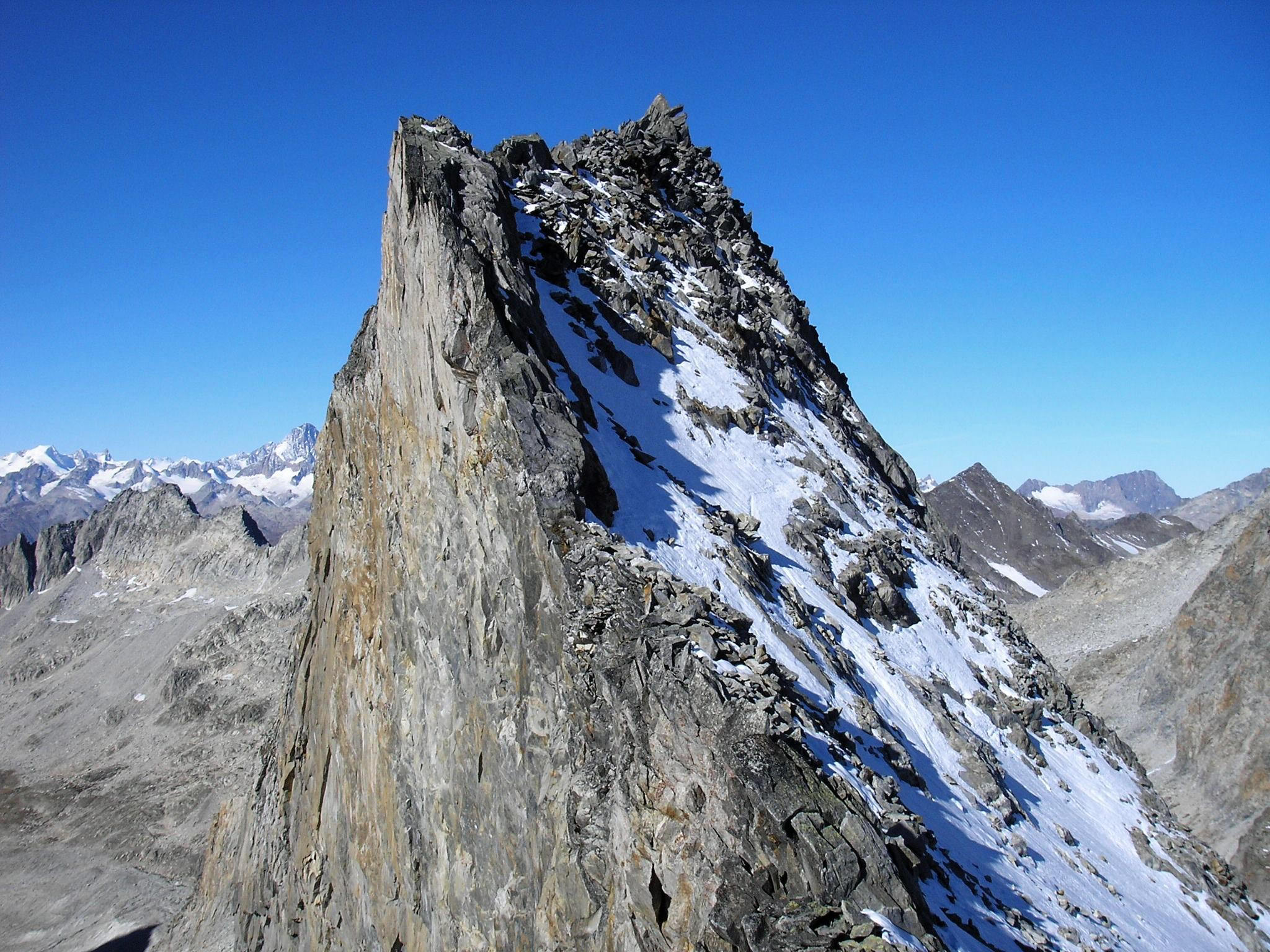
- The summit

Highest point
- Elevation: 3,085 m (10,121 ft)
- Prominence: 118 m (387 ft)
- Parent peak: Pizzo Rotondo
- Isolation: 0.42 km (0.26 mi) to Pizzo Pesciora
- Coordinates: 46°31′41.9″N 8°28′27.3″E

Geography
- Location within Switzerland
- Location: Valais/Uri, Switzerland (mountain partially in Ticino)
- Parent range: Lepontine Alps

The Witenwasserenstock (3,082 m) is a peak between the Swiss cantons of Valais and Uri, located in the Lepontine Alps. Close to the summit lies the tripoint border between the cantons of Valais, Uri and Ticino and the triple watershed of the Rhine, Po and Rhône basins.

== Geography and hydrography ==
The Witenwasserenstock lies between the valleys of Geretal (west) and Witenwasseren (north-east). At the foot of the mountain are located the Geren and Witenwasseren Glaciers. The tripoint between the cantons of Valais, Uri and Ticino (3,025 m) is located 300 m east from the summit. It acts as a notable watershed. On the west the Gerenwasser ends in the young Rhône, on the east the Witenwasserenreuss ends in the Reuss, a tributary of the Rhine and, on the east, the Ri di Bedretto ends in the Ticino (in the Leventina), a tributary of the Po.

- The Rhine enters the North Sea 670 km north.
- The Po enters the Adriatic Sea 360 km south-east.
- The Rhône enters the Mediterranean Sea 460 km south-west

== See also ==
- Piz Lunghin a Swiss mountain triple watershed of Danube, Po and Rhine.
