= Schöpfl =

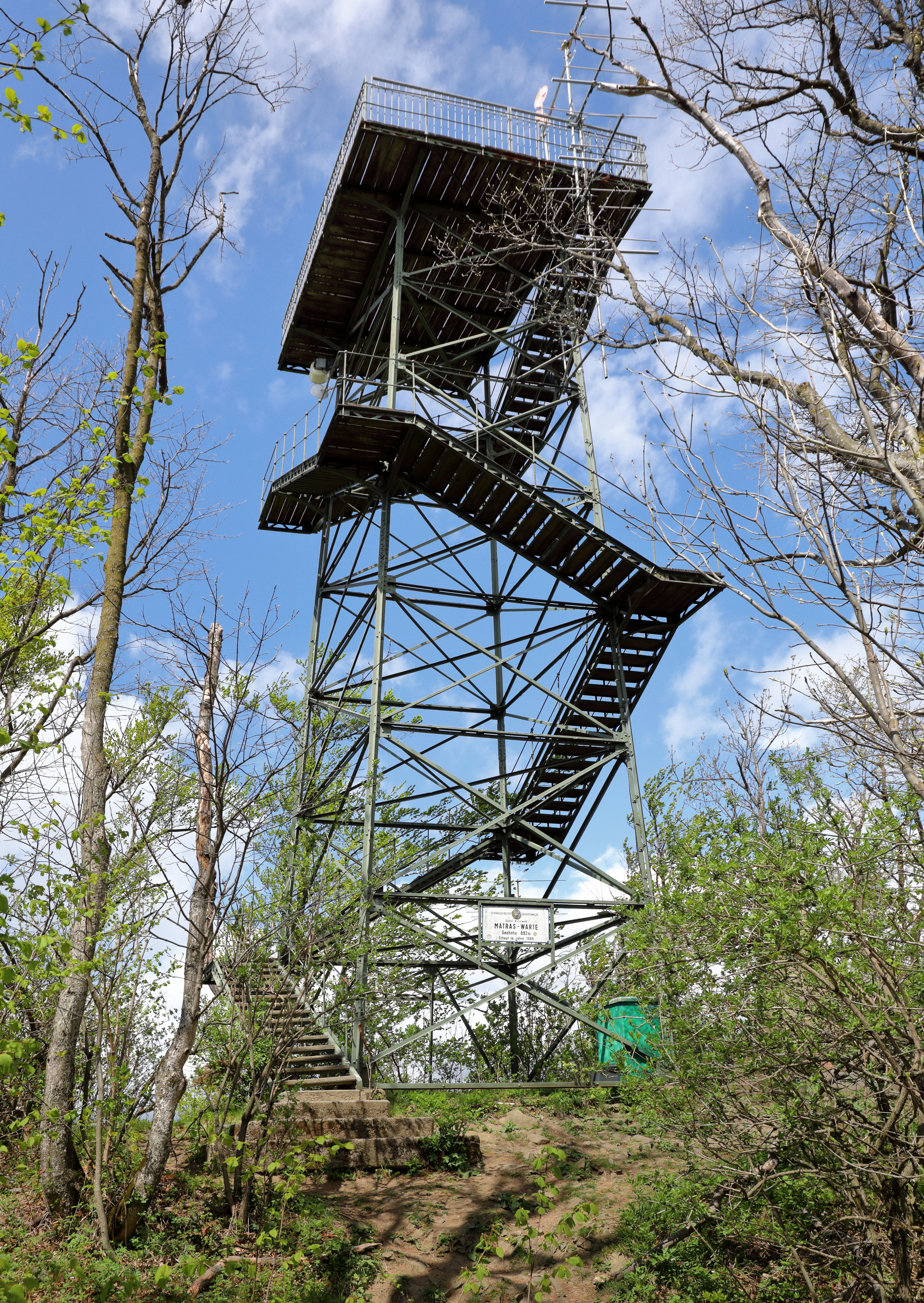
- Observation tower on top of the Schöpfl

Highest point
- Elevation: 893 m (2,930 ft)
- Prominence: 312 m (1,024 ft)
- Coordinates: 48°5′14″N 15°54′43″E

Geography
- Location: Lower Austria, Austria
- Parent range: Wienerwald

Schöpfl is the highest hill (893 m; 2,930 ft) in the Vienna Woods mountain range, the north-easternmost part of the Alps. Geologically, it belongs to the flysch Alps.

The main top of the wooded mountain range carries a high observation tower which enables a 100 km (60 mi) sight to the Northern Limestone Alps in the west and the Carpathian Mountains in the east.

At the Mitterschöpfl (approx. 882 m (2,894 ft) above sea level) is the University of Vienna's Leopold Figl observatory. Its largest instrument is a telescope with a primary mirror of 1.5 m (5 ft), which was constructed in the 1960s. A second tower was built recently for some smaller astrophysical telescopes.
