= Niederalpl Pass =

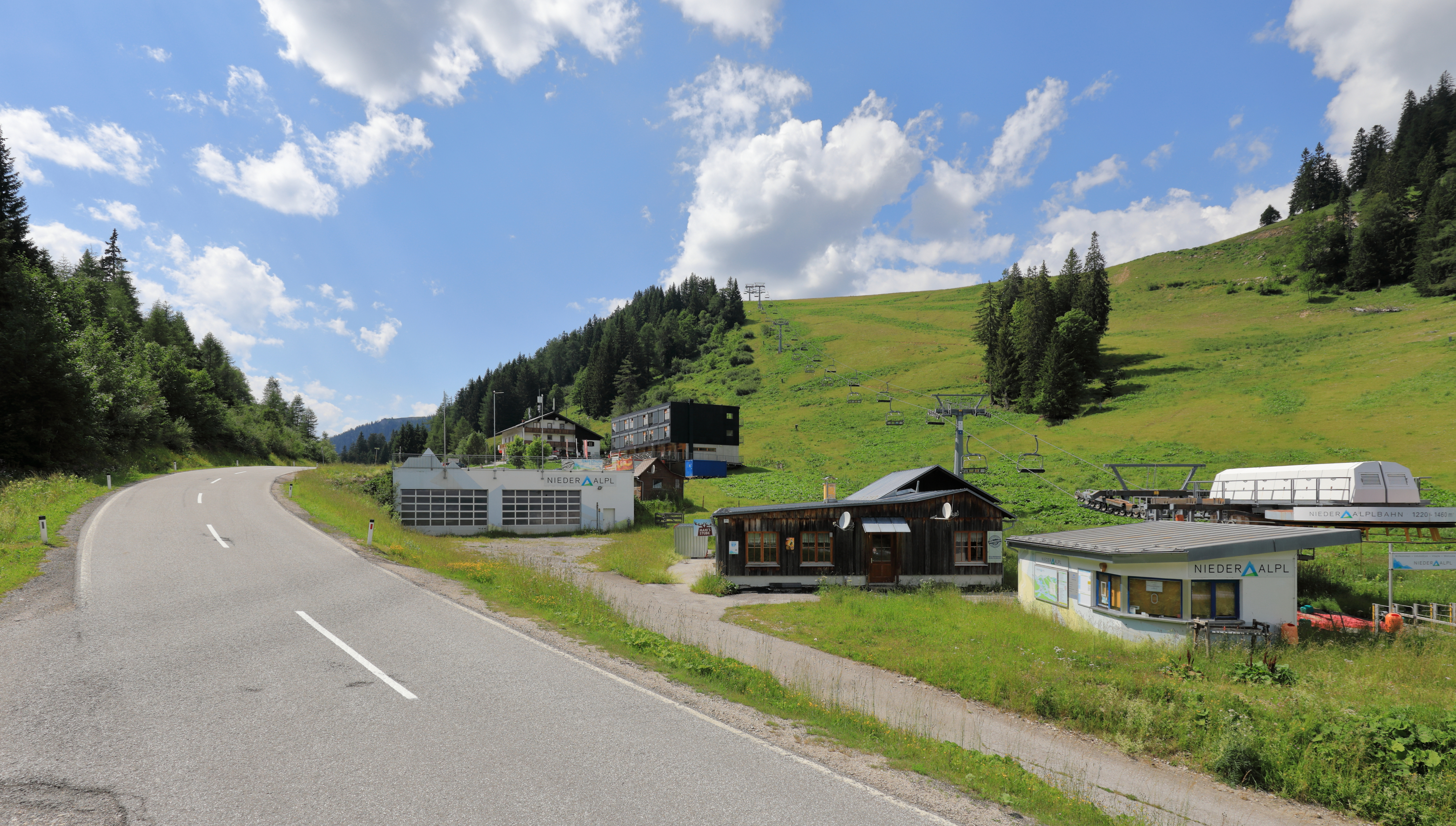

- Location within Alps
- Elevation: 1,221 m (4,006 ft)
- Traversed by: State Highway 113

Third Approach
- Location: Austria
- Range: Alps
- Coordinates: 47°40′N 15°22′E

Niederalpl Pass (el. 1,221 m.) is a high mountain pass in the Austrian Alps in the Bundesland of Styria.

It is traversed by State Highway 113 with a maximum grade of 10 percent. It connects Wegscheid and Mürzsteg. At the pass, there are two restaurants and several ski lifts. Neighboring peaks are the Hohe Veitsch and the Tonion.

== See also ==
- List of highest paved roads in Europe
- List of mountain passes
