= Hainfeld =

- Municipality
- Townhall in Hainfeld

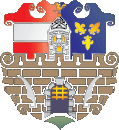
- Coat of arms

- Location within Austria
- Coordinates: 48°2′N 15°46′E
- Country: Austria
- State: Lower Austria
- District: Lilienfeld

Government
  - Mayor: Albert Pitterle (SPÖ)

Area
  - Total: 44.73 km^{2} (17.27 sq mi)
- Elevation: 439 m (1,440 ft)

Population (2018-01-01)
  - Total: 3,726
  - Density: 83.30/km^{2} (215.7/sq mi)
- Time zone: UTC+1 (CET)
  - Summer (DST): UTC+2 (CEST)
- Postal code: 3170
- Area code: 02764
- Website: www.hainfeld.at

Hainfeld is a municipality in the district of Lilienfeld in the Austrian state of Lower Austria.

== Geography ==
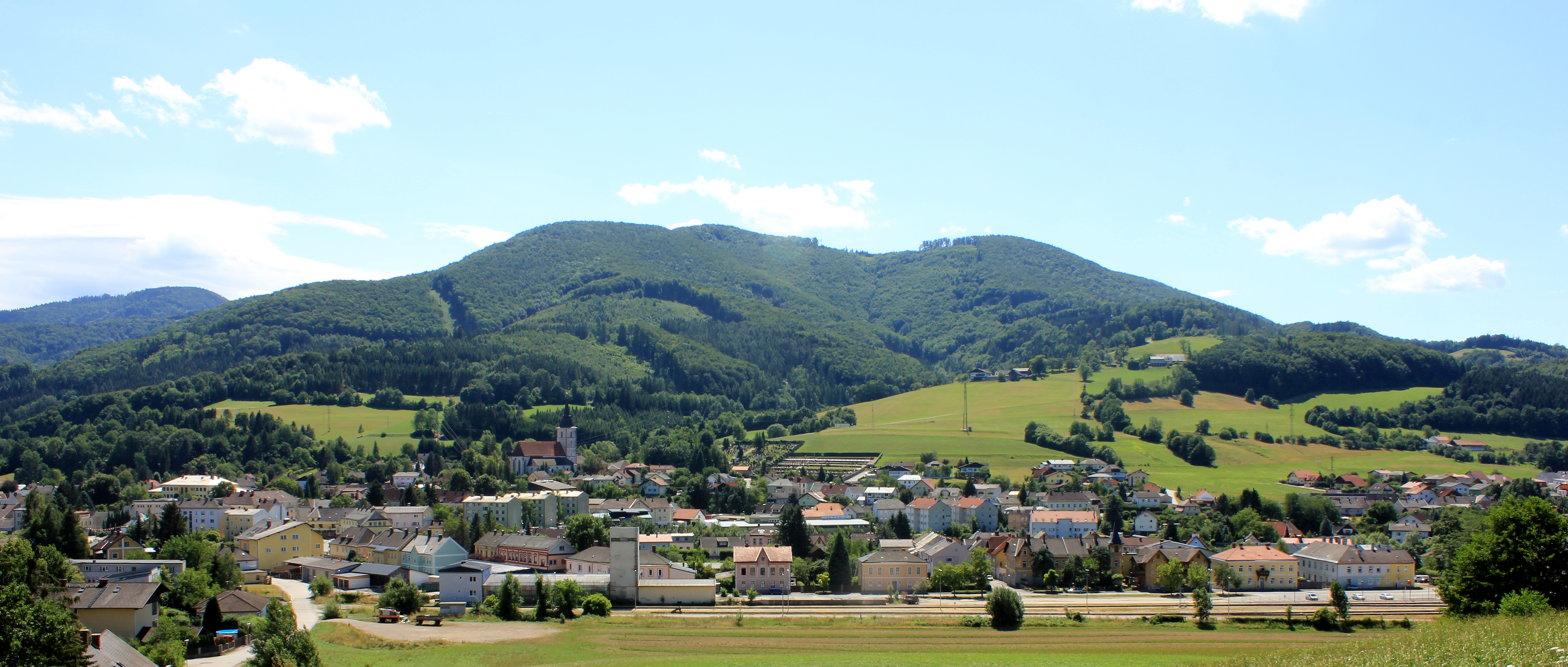
Hainfeld, 2015

Hainfeld is situated on the Gölsen River in the Southeast Lower Austria. It's the biggest city in Gölsen Valley (Gölsental). The Gölsen River begins in Hainfeld with the merging of Fliedersbach and Ramsaubach (also called Innere Gölsen). Through the city runs the street B18 (also called Hainfelder Straße). Highest mountain in the municipality is the Kirchenberg (Church Mountain) (924 m, 3,031 ft).

=== Municipality of Hainfeld ===
Following settlements are part of the municipality of Hainfeld (in parentheses population size as of January 1, 2017):

- Bernau (161)
- Gegend Egg (93)
- Gerichtsberg (68)
- Gerstbach (56)
- Gölsen (761)
- Gstettl (153)
- Hainfeld (1.968)
- Heugraben (14)
- Kasberg (48)
- Kaufmannberg (19)
- Landstal (28)
- Ob der Kirche (317)
- Vollberg (69)

=== Cadastral communities ===
Cadastral communities: Gegend Egg, Gölsen, Hainfeld, Heugraben, Kasberg, Landsthal, Ob der Kirche, Saugraben, Vollberg

== History ==
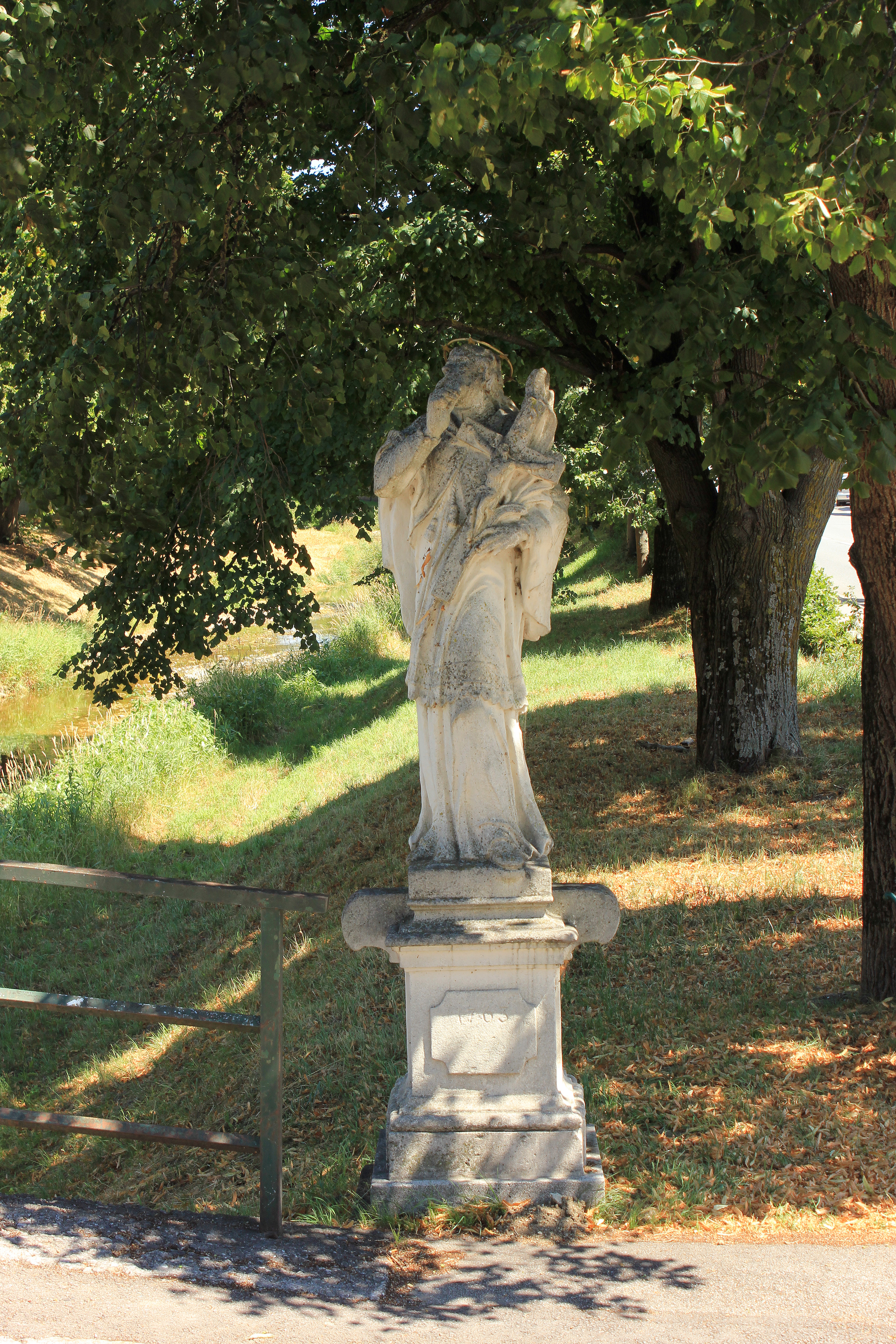
Statue of Saint John of Nepomuk in Hainfeld, 2015

In ancient times the area of Hainfeld was part of the Roman province Noricum. In 1280 Hainfeld was mentioned as a forum (market) which indicates a certain importance for the local region.

During the Middle Ages the market was part of the manorialism of Lilienfeld Abbey.

On 30 December 1888 the Austrian politician Victor Adler united some Austro-Hungarian socialist and worker's movements and associations to the Social Democratic Workers' Party of Austria (German: Sozialdemokratische Arbeiterpartei Österreichs, SDAPÖ) at the party congress in Hainfeld. This was the beginning of the modern Austrian party Social Democratic Party of Austria.

On 26 September 1928 the Lower Austrian State Government endowed Hainfeld with town privileges.

After World War II Hainfeld was the second most destroyed Austrian city behind Wiener Neustadt and part of the Soviet occupation zone in Allied-occupied Austria.

Ferdinand Benischke became to the first mayor after the war from 1945 to 1962.

== Population ==
Historical population
Year	Pop.	±%
1869	2,337	—
1880	2,807	+20.1%
1890	3,201	+14.0%
1900	3,776	+18.0%
1910	4,199	+11.2%
1923	4,114	−2.0%
1934	3,904	−5.1%
1939	3,831	−1.9%
1951	3,687	−3.8%
1961	3,883	+5.3%
1971	3,962	+2.0%
1981	3,723	−6.0%
1991	3,677	−1.2%
2001	3,696	+0.5%
2011	3,715	+0.5%
2014	3,682	−0.9%

== Notable people ==
- Chrysostomus Wieser (1664–1747), abbot of Lilienfeld Abbey
- Otto Kemptner (1890–1944), augustinian canon
- Arnold Röhrling (1893–1974), composer
- Marianne Zoff (1893–1984), actress and opera singer

== Sister Cities ==
Hainfeld is twinned with Issenheim since 1974.

Town	State/Region	Country
Issenheim	Haut-Rhin	France
