= Colle di Nava =

Mountain pass in Imperia, Italy

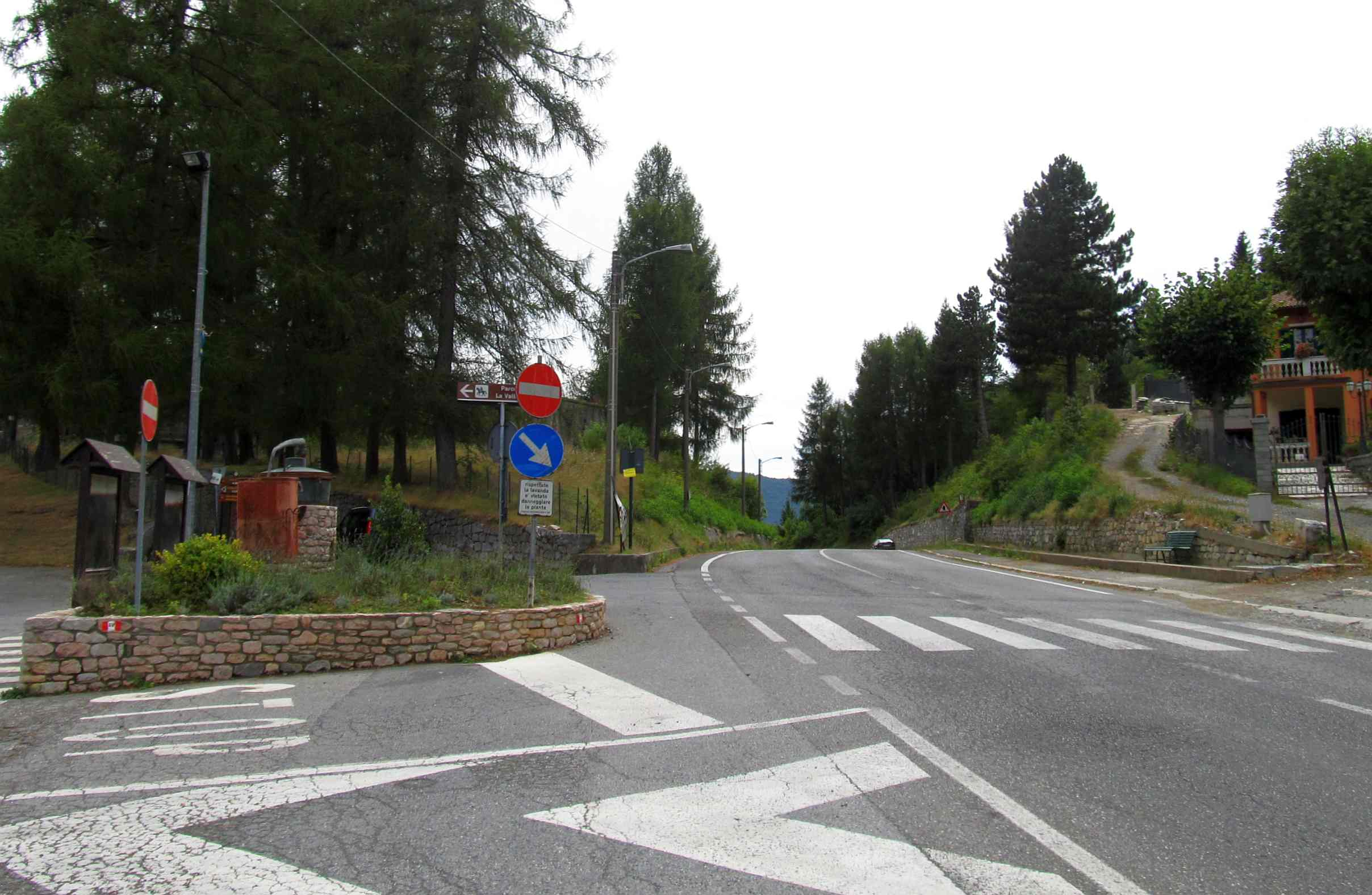
- The pass seen from its Tanaro Valley side

- Location within Alps
- Elevation: 934 metres (3,064 ft)
- Traversed by: Strada statale 28 del Colle di Nava

Third Approach
- Location: Liguria, Italy
- Range: Ligurian Alps
- Coordinates: 44°05′05″N 7°52′22″E

Colle di Nava at 934 metres (3,064 ft) is a mountain pass in the Province of Imperia in Italy. It is located on the main chain of the Alps and connects Ormea and the Tanaro Valley (CN) with Pieve di Teco and Imperia, the latter on the coast of Ligurian Sea. According both to the SOIUSA and the CAI, the pass marks the Western border of the Ligurian Prealps.

== Hiking ==
The pass is also accessible by off-road mountain paths and is crossed by the Alta Via dei Monti Liguri, a long-distance trail from Ventimiglia (province of Imperia) to Bolano (province of La Spezia).

== See also ==
- List of mountain passes

== Bibliography ==
- Montagna, Euro; Montaldo, Lorenzo (1981). Alpi Liguri. Guida dei Monti d'Italia (in Italian). San Donato Milanese: CAI-TCI.
