= Pizzo Rotondo =

Mountain in Switzerland

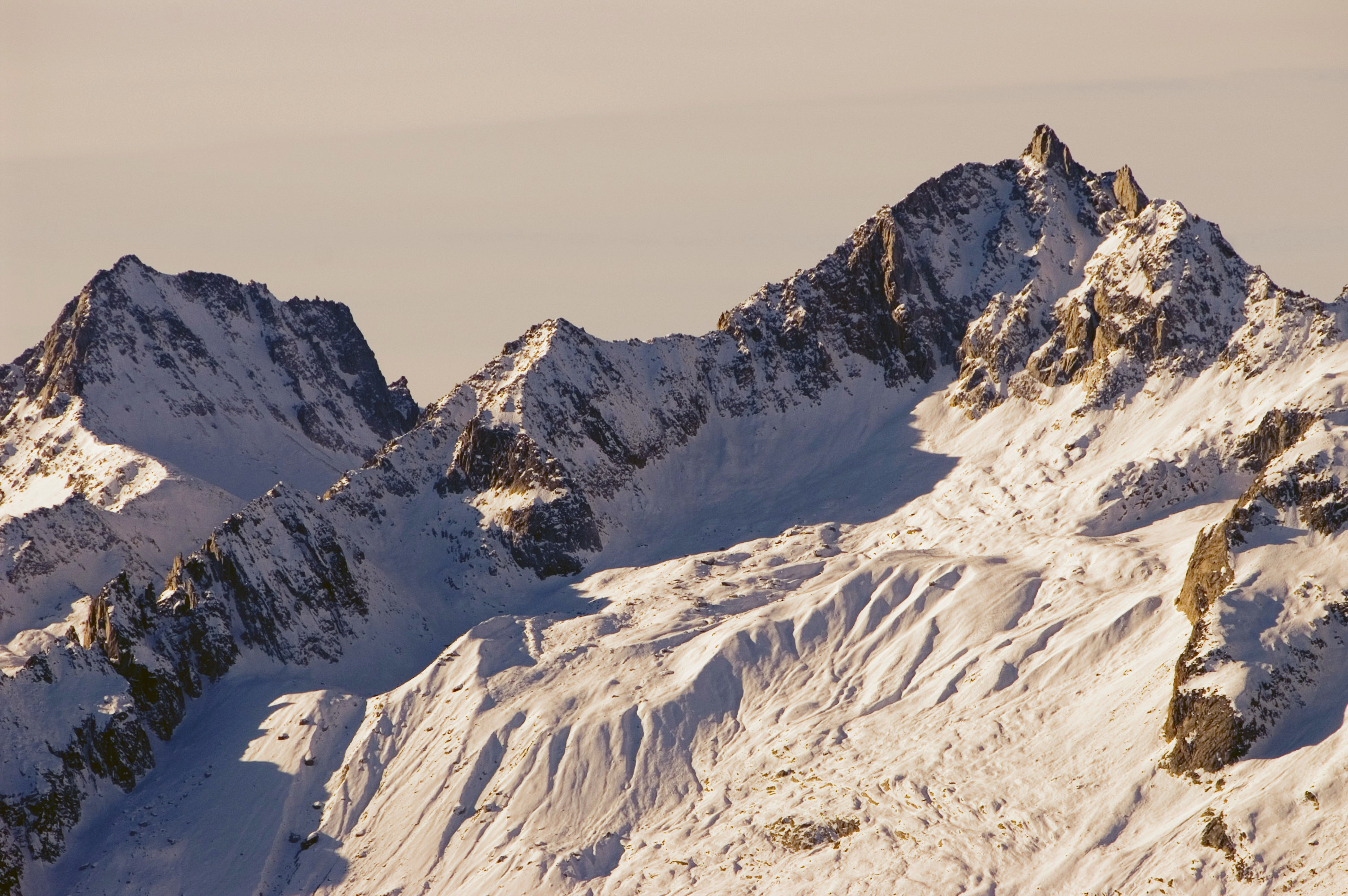
- Pizzo Rotondo and Chüebodenhorn (left)

Highest point
- Elevation: 3,192 m (10,472 ft)
- Prominence: 768 m (2,520 ft)
- Parent peak: Basòdino
- Isolation: 10.05 km (6.24 mi)
- Listing: Alpine mountains above 3000 m
- Coordinates: 46°31′01″N 8°27′57″E

Geography
- Location within Switzerland
- Location: Ticino/Valais, Switzerland
- Parent range: Lepontine Alps

Climbing
- First ascent: 5 August 1869, by Viktor Haller, Joseph Maria Trösch and Angelo Boffa

Pizzo Rotondo is a mountain in the Lepontine Alps. At 3,190 metres above sea level, it is the highest mountain lying on the border between the cantons of Ticino and Valais, as well as the highest summit of the Lepontine Alps lying between Nufenen Pass and Lukmanier Pass.

The massif of Piz Rotondo separates the valleys of the upper Rhone (Valais) and upper Ticino. About two kilometres north-east lies the Witenwasserenstock, which is the watershed between the basins of the Rhone, Po and Rhine.

On the north side lies a relatively large glacier named Gerengletscher, which extends to the ridge of the Witenwasserenstock. On the south side, at Passo di Rotondo, lies a smaller glacier named Ghiacciaio del Pizzo Rotondo.

The first ascent by Viktor Haller and his guides on August 5, 1869, started from Bedretto in Ticino over the east face and the (by now nearly gone) Pesciora glacier. Only four days later, the second ascent took place, this time from the other site. F. Schläpfer and his guides Rudolf Elmer and Johann Kreuzer, started from Oberwald, and made the first ascent of the north summit via the long Geren valley and the Geren glacier. Only Elmer and Kreuzer traversed to the somewhat higher southern summit.

== See also ==
- List of mountains of Ticino
- List of mountains of Valais
- List of most isolated mountains of Switzerland
