= Livigno Pass =

Mountain pass in the Alps

Forcola di Livigno Pass
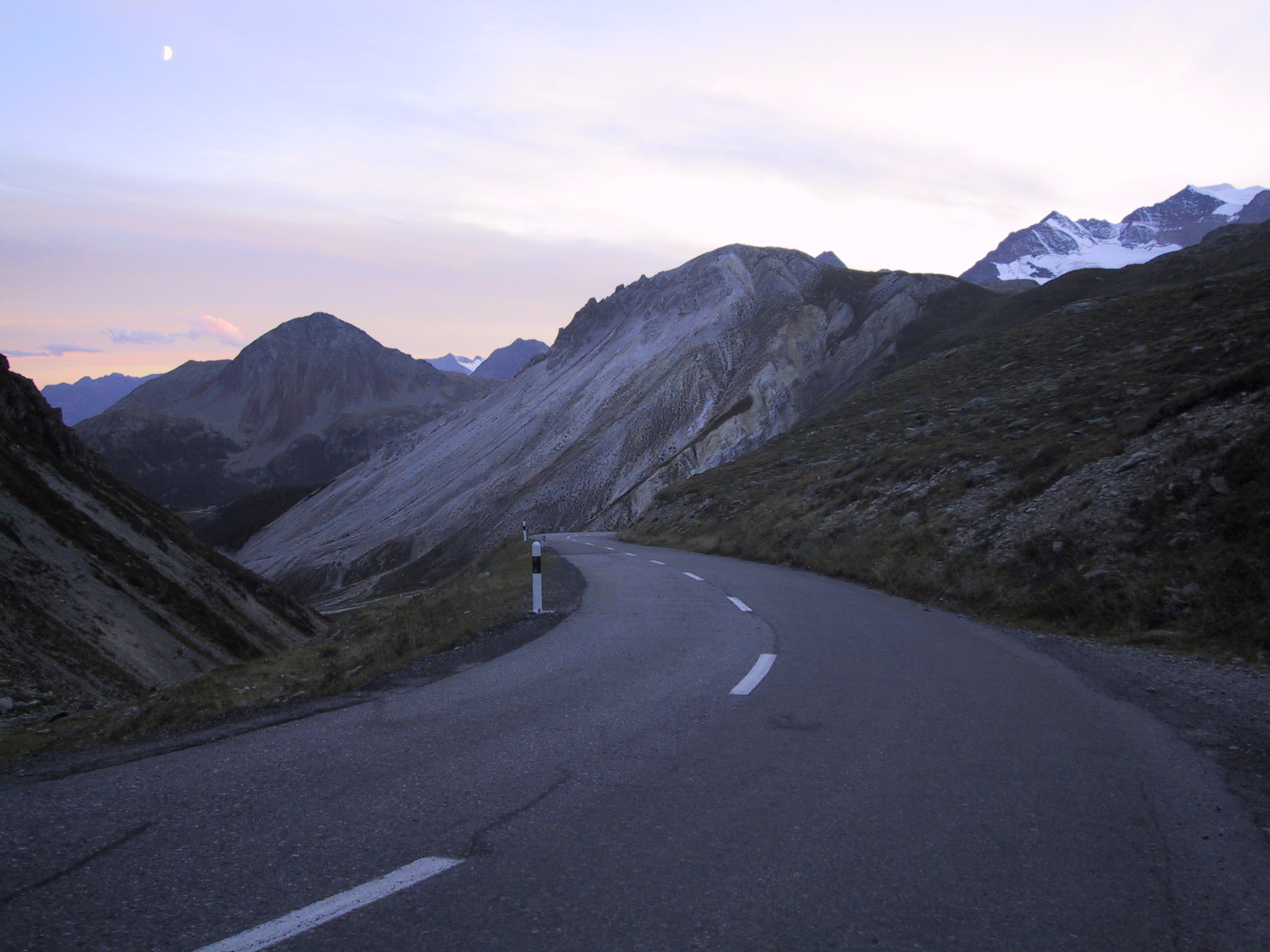
- Forcola di Livigno Pass

- Location within Alps
- Elevation: 2,315 metres (7,595 ft)
- Traversed by: Road

Third Approach
- Location: Italy–Switzerland border
- Range: Alps
- Coordinates: 46°26′33″N 10°03′25″E

Livigno Pass or Forcola di Livigno Pass (Italian: Forcola di Livigno, Romansh: Fuorcla da Livign) is a high (2,315 m (7,595 ft)) mountain pass in the Alps on the border between the canton of Graubünden in Switzerland and the Province of Sondrio in Italy.

It connects Bernina Pass in Switzerland with Livigno in Italy.

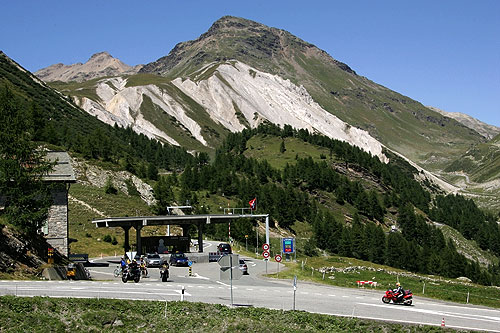

== Characteristics ==
Forcola di Livigno Pass is located at the pass itself, as it lies on the border.The Swiss customs house is further down the valley, near the junction with the cantonal road that climbs to the Bernina Pass. The Italian side, which ascends from Livigno, has no hairpin bends, and the very long straights are interspersed with short apparently flat stretches. The road does not directly overlook any particularly notable mountains. The other side is more tortuous, but at times offers glimpses of some Rhaetian Alps.

The pass has the unique feature of connecting a valley south of the Alps, but it is politically under Swiss control (Val Poschiavo, belonging to the Adda river), with a valley north of the Alps, but politically under Italian control (the Livigno Valley, belonging to the river, Inn). The Predil Pass shares the same unique feature. From an orographic perspective, it divides the Livigno Alps in two.

== See also ==
- List of highest paved roads in Europe
- List of mountain passes
- List of the highest Swiss passes
