= Schober Pass =

- Location within Alps
- Elevation: 849 metres (2,785 ft)

Third Approach
- Location: Austria
- Range: Alps
- Coordinates: 47°27′N 14°40′E

Schober Pass (el. 849 m.) is a high mountain pass in the Austrian Alps, located in the Bundesland of Styria.

== See also ==
- List of highest paved roads in Europe
- List of mountain passes
