= Lahn Saddle =

Mountain pass in the Austrian Alps

Lahn Saddle Lahnsattel
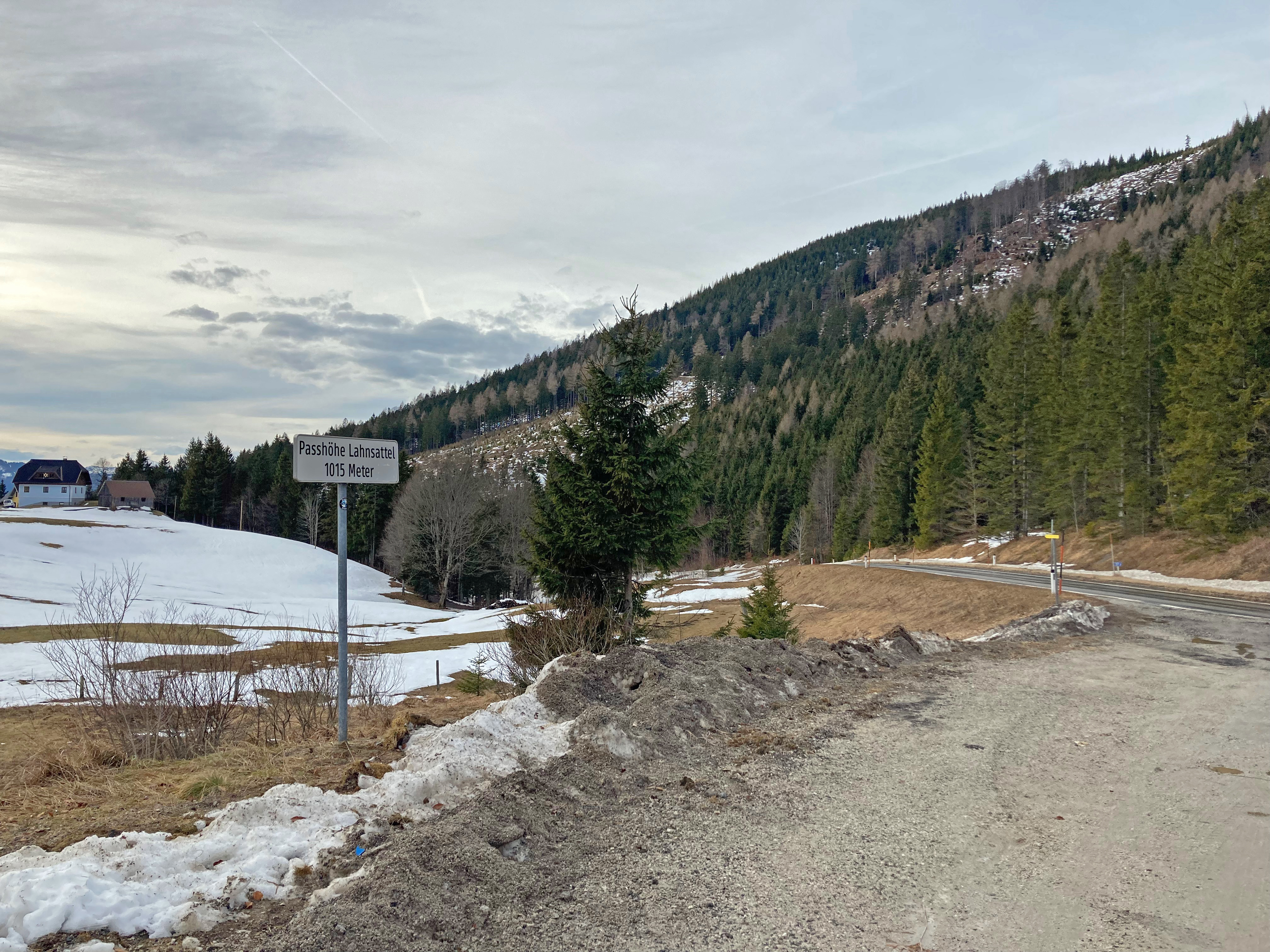
- Summit of the pass

- Location within Alps
- Elevation: 1,006 m (3,301 ft)
- Traversed by: Federal Highway B 23

Third Approach
- Location: Austria
- Range: Alps
- Coordinates: 47°35′30″N 15°29′10″E

The Lahn Saddle (German: Lahnsattel) (el. 1,006 m [3,301 ft]) is a high mountain pass in the Austrian Alps between the Bundesländer of Lower Austria and Styria.

It is traversed by Federal Highway B 23.

It connects the Salza river valley from Mariazell with the Mürz river valley.

The southeast side has a maximum grade of 11 percent. The west side from Terz im Halltal has a maximum grade of 17 percent. Three kilometres (1.9 mi) away is the peak of the Göller massif (1,766 m [5,794 ft]), with the Wildalpe in the south.

The town of Lahnsattel (1 kilometre [0.62 mi] east of the pass) has lost one fifth of its population in recent times.

== See also ==
- List of highest paved roads in Europe
- List of mountain passes
