= Ochsattel =

Mountain pass in Lower Austria Alps

- Location within Alps
- Elevation: 820 metres (2,690 ft)

Third Approach
- Location: Austria
- Range: Alps
- Coordinates: 47°52′56″N 15°38′22″E

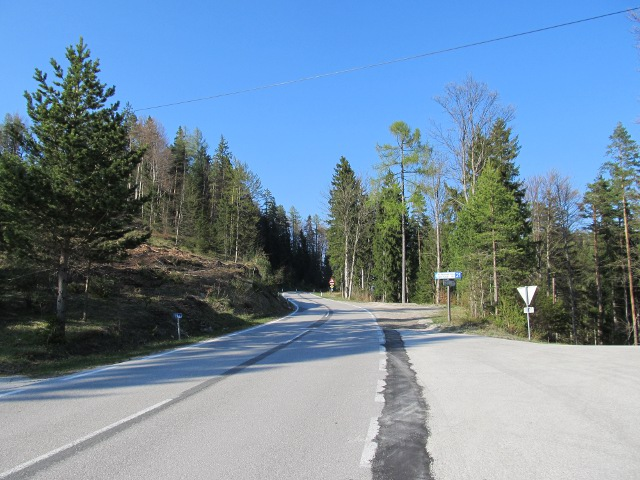
Ochsattel Pass summit

Ochsattel (el. 820 m.) is a mountain pass in the foothills of the Austrian Alps in the Bundesland of Lower Austria.

It connects St. Aegyd am Neuwalde and Kalte Kuchl. The pass road has a maximum grade of 10 percent.

== See also ==
- List of highest paved roads in Europe
- List of mountain passes
