= Altenburg Castle (Lower Austria) =

Coordinates: 48.0736°N 15.6022°E

Altenburg Castle (German: Burg Altenburg) is a ruined castle on the Altenburger Kogel near the village of Rotheau in the Lilienfeld District of Lower Austria.

== History ==
Altenburg was built by Konrad von Hohenstaff after he and his brother, Leutold, had lost their old ancestral seat, the Staffburg Castle near Sankt Veit an der Gölsen. Duke Leopold VI had it demolished and donated it to the Lilienfeld Abbey. With the construction of Altenburg, Konrad von Hohenstaff (later known as Konrad von Altenburg) became the founder of the Altenburg family.

However, the brothers and their family only lived in their new residence for a short time. After its construction in the early 13th century, it was already a ruin by the beginning of the 14th century. This was because the Altenburgers had received Wildegg Castle through marriage in 1261 and moved there. The descendants of Leutold von Hohenstaff-Altenburg did not live in Altenburg either, as they had founded their own noble family, the Hohenbergers, with the construction of Hohenberg Castle.

By the end of the 14th century at the latest, Altenburg was no longer owned by the Hohenstaff-Altenburg-Hohenberg ministerialis family as Hans der Alachter sold the Meierhof below Altenburg to Ulrich von Pergau in 1386. The records about Altenburg end in 1388. At this time, Lilienfeld Abbey had preserved Altenburg as a ruin, but the monks of the monastery allowed it to continue to decay until the walls completely disappeared.

=== Modern times ===
From 1860 to 1901 the castle was owned by the Enk family. It was later taken over by the Singer family, who sold it to the Austrian Children's Friends (German: Österreichische Kinderfreunde) in 1930.

In 1947, the castle stables came into the possession of the Lower Austria regional group of the SPÖ Free School Children's Friends.

== See also ==
- List of castles in Austria
