= Hohenburg Castle =

Hohenberg or Hohenburg Castle may refer to:

In Austria:

- Hohenburg (Igls), a castle in Igls, North Tyrol, near Innsbruck, Austria
- Burgruine Hohenburg (Oberdrauburg), a ruined castle in Oberdrauburg, Spittal an der Drau district, Carinthia, Austria
- Burgruine Hohenburg auf Rosenberg, a ruined medieval castle near Pusarnitz, Carinthia, Austria
- Hohenburg Castle (Styria), a castle in Söding-Sankt Johann, Voitsberg district, Styria, Austria

In France:

- Château de Hohenbourg, a ruined castle in Alsace, France

In Germany:

- Hohenburg (Lenggries), a ruined medieval castle in Lenggries, Bavaria
- Schloss Hohenburg, an 18th-century palace in Lenggries, Bavaria
- Hohenberg Castle (Hohenberg an der Eger), Hohenberg an der Eger, Bavaria

Other:

- Hohenburg an der Unstrut, medieval castle and monastery in the Unstrut-Hainich district, Thuringia
- Hohenburg Monastery on Mount Odilienberg in Alsace

== See also ==
- Hohenburg (disambiguation)
- Hohenberg Castle
