= Hehenberger =

Hehenberger is a surname. Notable people with the surname include:

- Gretchen Hehenberger (1918–2012), Austrian gymnast
- Josef Hehenberger (born 1940), Austrian priest
- Karin M. Hehenberger, Swedish physician

== See also ==
- Hohenberger
