= Hohenbourg =

Hohenbourg may refer to:

- Château de Hohenbourg in Alsace
- Mont Sainte-Odile Abbey in Alsace, also called Hohenbourg Abbey

== See also ==
- Hohenburg (disambiguation)
