= Château de Frœnsbourg =

Castle in Bas-Rhin, Grand Est, France

Coordinates: 49°02′13″N 7°44′35″E

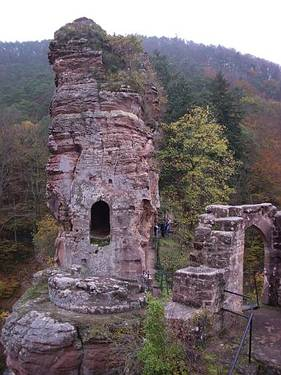
Part of the ruins

The Château de Frœnsbourg is a ruined French castle north west of the town of Lembach, within the Bas-Rhin département. It has been listed since 1898 as a monument historique by the French Ministry of Culture. It is partially a troglodyte structure (built into the side of a cliff or mountain, using caves as connecting halls), with two main buildings making up the rest of the structure.

== History ==
The castle was indirectly mentioned in 1235 (according to A. Thon). It is attested in 1269, in an account of the brothers "of Frundsperg". Until the 1340s, the castle would have belonged exclusively to the Froensbourgs, who had the same armorial bearings as the Fleckensteins (of which family they were probably a branch).

A little before the middle of the 14th century, the castle was divided between the lords of Froensbourg (who kept half of it), Loewenstein and Sickingen. It was besieged and ruined, in 1349, because of the banditry of Reinhard von Sickingen, but was certainly restored after 1358, the date when the castle was offered as a stronghold to the Palatine Count. The dwelling tower on the southern rock, known as the small castle, was owned towards the end of the 15th century by Fleckenstein, who had it restored. Its main door is dated 1481.

The big castle occupied the whole of the northern rock. At the higher level, on the side of a likely attack, is a keep with living quarters towards the south. On the middle and lower floors were located the common buildings and dependences made of wood - traces of anchorings remain in the rocks - and troglodytic rooms. The lower courtyard stood in the west and there was a ditch to the north. There are several staircases cut into the rock. The castle was destroyed by the French in 1677 but was probably already abandoned at that time.

== Architecture ==
The castle stands on an isolated sandstone spur oriented north-south, separated from the mountain by a large ditch. The spur, split in two, comprises a longer and higher northern rock, connected at mid-level by a modern footbridge to the southern rock. At the base of the northern rock, on the north-western side, a low room is cut into the rock and joined by a narrow bay (of unspecified date) to a tiny cylindrical room leading to the middle level. This could correspond to an old well-cistern. Above the door is evidence of the anchoring for a drawbridge. Further south, a western projection with access door is located, a winding staircase cut in the sandstone, traces of buildings with a stable, a well in a corner and vestiges of staircases in the rock. At the middle level, to the east (reached via a modern staircase and a largely original door) are two rooms cut in the rock; to the north is the upper part of the old well-cistern. Towards the south, a square cistern close to the modern footbridge gives access to the small southern rock. This is entirely occupied by the remains of the dwelling tower whose Gothic arch doorway remains, dated 1481.

The remains of the northern keep and the lodgings towards the south, located on the higher terrace of the northern rock, are inaccessible.

== See also ==
- List of castles in France
- Château du Fleckenstein
