= Hohenberg =

Hohenberg may refer to:

== Places ==
=== Austria ===
- Hohenberg (Gemeinde Lunz), cadastral municipality of Lunz am See, Lower Austria
- Hohenberg, Lower Austria, a municipality in the district of Lilienfeld, Lower Austria
- Hohenberg (Gemeinde Aigen), village in the municipality of Aigen im Ennstal, Styria
- Hohenberg (Gemeinde Stattegg), village in the municipality of Stattegg, Styria

=== Germany ===
- Hohenberg (Aalen), a village in the borough of Aalen, Ostalbkreis, Baden-Württemberg
- Hohenberg (Bopfingen), a village in the borough of Bopfingen, Ostalbkreis, Baden-Württemberg
- Hohenberg (Durbach), a village in the municipality of Durbach, Ortenaukreis, Baden-Württemberg
- Hohenberg (Kreßberg), a village in the municipality of Kreßberg, county of Schwäbisch Hall, Baden-Württemberg
- Hohenberg (Rosenberg), a village in the municipality of Rosenberg, Ostalbkreis, Baden-Württemberg
- Hohenberg (Sulzbach-Laufen), a village in the municipality of Sulzbach-Laufen, county of Schwäbisch Hall, Baden-Württemberg
- Hohenberg (Wolpertshausen), a village in the municipality of Wolpertshausen, county of Schwäbisch Hall, Baden-Württemberg
- Hohenberg (Herrieden), a village in the borough of Herrieden, county of Ansbach, Bayern
- Hohenberg (Marktleugast), a village in the borough of Marktleugast, county of Kulmbach, Bayern
- Hohenberg (Regnitzlosau), a village in the municipality of Regnitzlosau, county of Hof, Bayern
- Hohenberg (Seeshaupt), a village in the municipality of Seeshaupt, county of Weilheim-Schongau, Bayern
- Hohenberg an der Eger, town in the county of Wunsiedel, Bayern
- Hohenberg-Krusemark, a municipality in the county of Stendal, Saxony-Anhalt
- Hohenberg (Daldorf), a village in the municipality of Daldorf, county of Segeberg, Schleswig-Holstein

== People ==
- Hohenberg family, an Austrian ducal family
- Count of Hohenberg, an ancient Swabian dynasty
- Count of Hohenberg (Pfinzgau), a state in the Holy Roman Empire, formed in the 11th century
- German nobility:
  - Gertrude of Hohenberg (1225–1281), progenitor of the Austrian House of Habsburg
  - Gustav von Meyern-Hohenberg (1820–1878), German jurist and playwright
  - Maximilian, Duke of Hohenberg (1902–1962)
  - Sophie, Duchess of Hohenberg (1868–1914)
  - Princess Sophie of Hohenberg (1901–1990)
  - Prince Ernst of Hohenberg (1904–1954)
  - Georg, Duke of Hohenberg (born 1929)
- Pierre Hohenberg (1934–2017), French-American theoretical physicist

== Other uses ==
- Hohenberg Bros. Co., a cotton trading company
- Hohenberg (Wasgau), a hill in the Palatinate Forest, southwestern Germany

== See also ==
- Hohenberg Castle (disambiguation)
- Hohenburg (disambiguation)
