= Hohenburg =

Hohenburg may refer to:

== Settlements ==
- Hohenburg, Bavaria, a municipality in Bavaria, Germany
- Hohenburg an der Weichsel, the German name for Wyszogród, Poland

== Castles ==
- Burgruine Hohenburg auf Rosenberg, a ruined medieval castle in Carinthia, Austria
- Hohenburg (Lenggries), a ruined medieval castle in Lenggries, Bavaria
- Schloss Hohenburg, an 18th-century palace in Lenggries, Bavaria
- Château de Hohenbourg, a ruined castle in Alsace, France
- Hohenburg Castle (Homburg), a ruined castle in Saarland, Germany

== Other structures ==
- Hohenburg Abbey, now usually known as Mont Sainte-Odile Abbey, in Alsace, France

== See also ==
- Hohenberg (disambiguation)
- Hohenbourg (disambiguation)
- Homburg
