= Claude-Hélène Perrot =

French historian and Africanist (1928–2019)

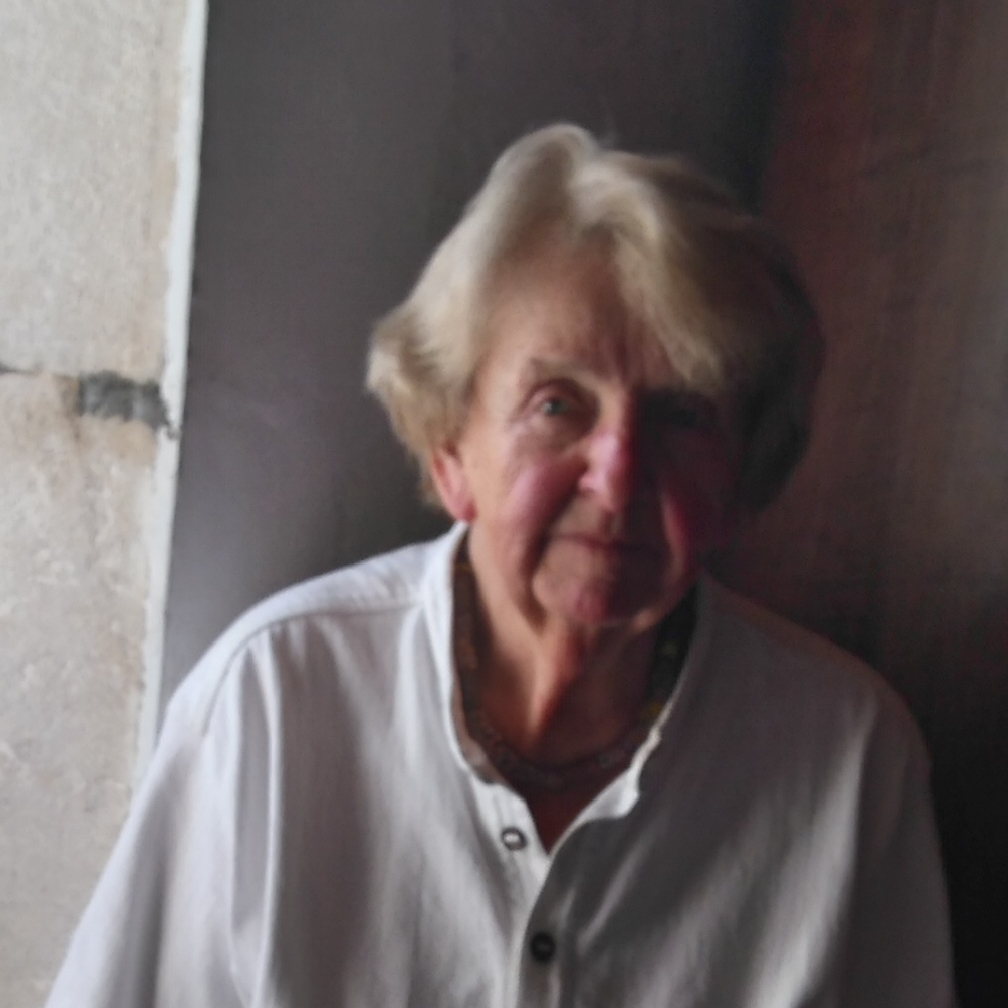
- Born: 13 September 1928
- Died: 16 July 2019 (aged 90)
- Education: University of Paris
- Occupation: Historian

Claude-Hélène Perrot (French: [klod‿elɛn pɛʁo]; 13 September 1928 – 16 July 2019) was a French historian and Africanist who specialized in the history of Côte d'Ivoire. She served as a professor of contemporary African history at the Paris 1 Panthéon-Sorbonne University from 1983 to 1993. Perrot's main areas of research concerned the history of the Akan of Côte d'Ivoire and Ghana before colonization, mainly the Anyi and the Eotile; the use of oral tradition by historians; as well as relations between traditional African religions and political power. She was honored as Commander, Order of Ivory Merit.

== Early life and education ==
Claude-Hélène Perrot was born in Lembach on 13 September 1928 into a Franche-Comté family. She was the sister of François Perrot.

Perrot completed a degree in history and geography at the Sorbonne in 1950, and after obtaining further training, became a secondary education teacher in Cholet and Coulommiers, from 1955 to 1961.

Her interests in Africa occurred during a trip to Senegal, after which she enrolled at the École pratique des hautes études, where she studied under Roger Bastide and Georges Balandier. She worked in the archives of the Paris Evangelical Missionary Society and prepared a thesis on the Sotho king Moshoeshoe I, which she defended at the Faculté des lettres de Paris, in 1963, and which was published in 1970 under the title Les Sotho et les Missionnaires européens au XIXe siècle ("The Sotho and European Missionaries in the 19th century").

== Career ==
Perrot was affiliated with the School of Letters in Abidjan and Université Félix Houphouët-Boigny, until 1971. During the period of 1971 till 1973, she was with National Centre for Scientific Research (CNRS) in Paris. In 1973, she was appointed lecturer at the University of Paris 1 Pantheon-Sorbonne. In 1978, she defended a state thesis, entitled Les Anyi-Ndenyé et le pouvoir politique aux XVIIIe et XIXe siècles ("The Anyi-Ndenyé and political power in the 18th and 19th centuries") at Paris Descartes University, and published under the same title in 1984. In 1983, she was elected professor at University of Paris 1 Pantheon-Sorbonne. She retired from academia in 1993, while continuing to lead a university seminar and to travel to Côte d'Ivoire for conferences. She belonged to the Comité de vigilance face aux usages publics de l'histoire.

Perrot died in Paris on 16 July 2019.

== Awards ==
- Commander, Order of Ivory Merit

== Selected works ==
- Les Sothos et les missionnaires européens, Annales de l'université d'Abidjan, série F, tome 2/1, Impr. Darantière, Dijon, 1970, p. 192. (in French)
- Les Anyi-Ndényé et le pouvoir aux 18 et 19 siècles, Publications de la Sorbonne, 1982. (in French)
- « Les Missionnaires français et la construction d'un État. Le Lesotho au temps d'Eugène Casalis », in Daniel C. Bach (dir.), La France et l'Afrique du sud. Histoire, mythes et enjeux contemporains, Karthala, 1990, pp. 111–132 ISBN 2-86537-269-3 (in French)
- (dir.) Lignages et territoire en Afrique aux XVIII & XIX. Stratégies, compétition, intégration, Khartala, 2000 (in French)
- Les Éotilé de Côte d'Ivoire aux XVIII & XIX. Pouvoir lignager et religion, Publications de la Sorbonne, 2008, coll. « Homme et société », p. 272, ISBN 978-2-85944-598-0 (in French)
