= Lilienfelderhof =

Domaene Lilienfeld - Lilienfelderhof - is one of the oldest wine estates in Central Europe. Situated in Pfaffstätten, 30 km south of Vienna, Austria, it traces its history to an endowment made by the Babenberger Leopold VI, Duke of Austria (“the Glorious”) to the Cistercian monks at Lilienfeld Abbey in 1202, though the buildings as such (as opposed to the endowment) are traditionally dated to 1209. In 2006 Domaene Lilienfeld (Lilienfelderhof) was acquired by the Hildebrand Private Foundation, on the basis of a 99-year leasehold (Baurecht). The foundation is currently in the process of restoring and revitalising both the numerous buildings and 20 hectares (ca. 50 acres) of vineyards.

== History ==
Agricultural and economic activities carried out by the Cistercian religious order in distinct locations from the mother monastery were concentrated around so-called “granges” (monastic grange)—enclosed estates housing a church, manor house, additional residences, a well, buildings for agricultural and economic activities, a mill, frequently fish ponds, and sometimes a tavern. Here monks (priests, but primarily lay-brothers), together with non-religious stewards, managed the abbey's affairs in the region, primarily agriculture and viticulture.

Thus Domaene Lilienfeld is home to a gothic church seating around 100 persons (“St. John the Baptist Chapel”), a manor house, a wine tavern (i.e. a traditional Austrian “Heurige”, currently under renovation), and an array of other buildings.

Probably on account of its ecclesiastical owners, Domaene Lilienfeld (Lilienfelderhof) has played an important role in private and public life in Pfaffstätten and the Thermenregion. During the Russian occupation of parts of Austria following WWII (see: Allied-administered Austria) starving people were fed from a secret kitchen inside the estate. During the same era a Cistercian monk from the estate survived being shot by a Russian soldier while defending a woman from attack. Many other people have at some time worked or lived on the estate or attended kindergarten there, since for some years the local kindergarten was housed in the estate's manor house.

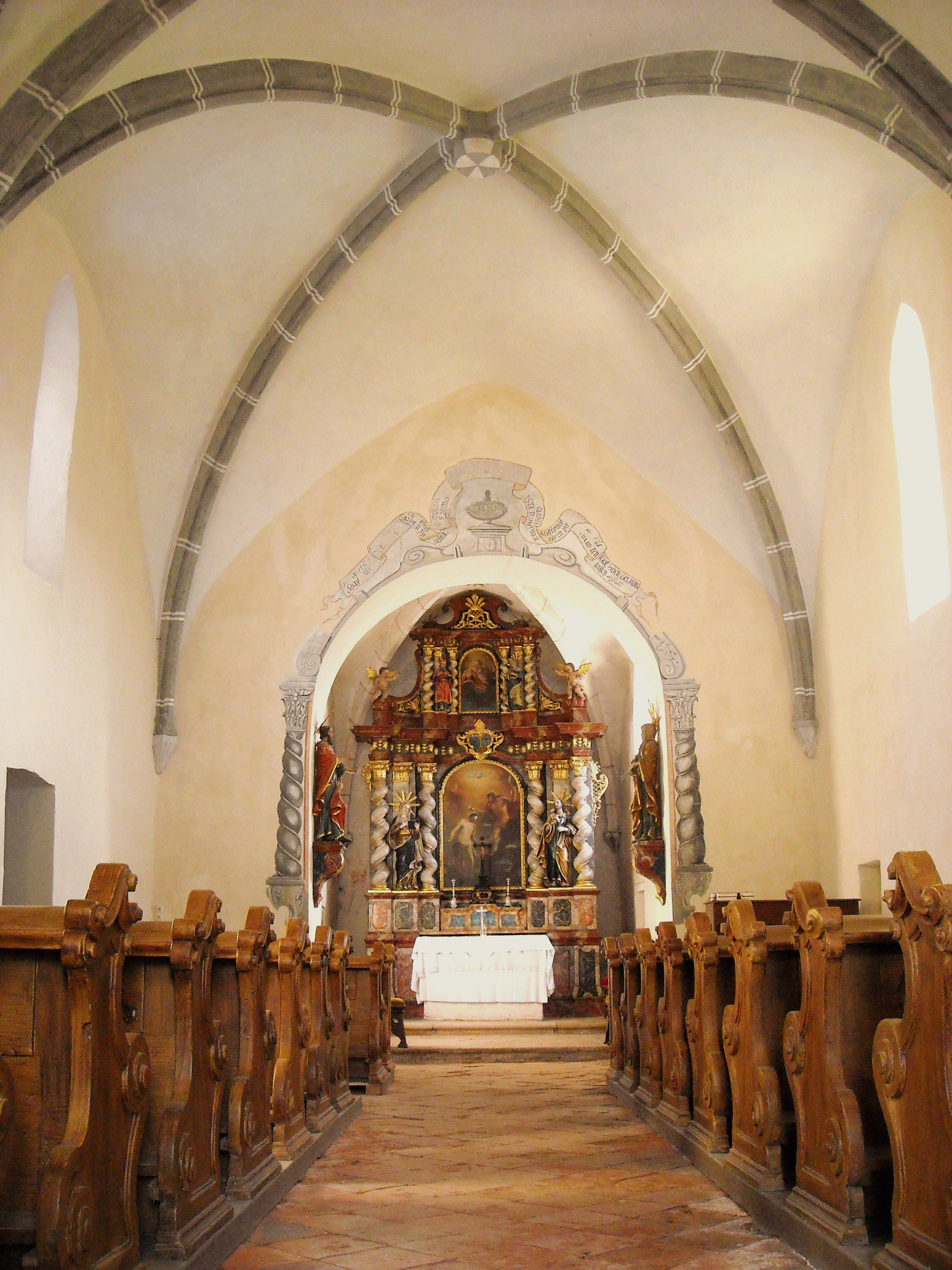
St. John the Baptist Chapel, Lilienfelderhof

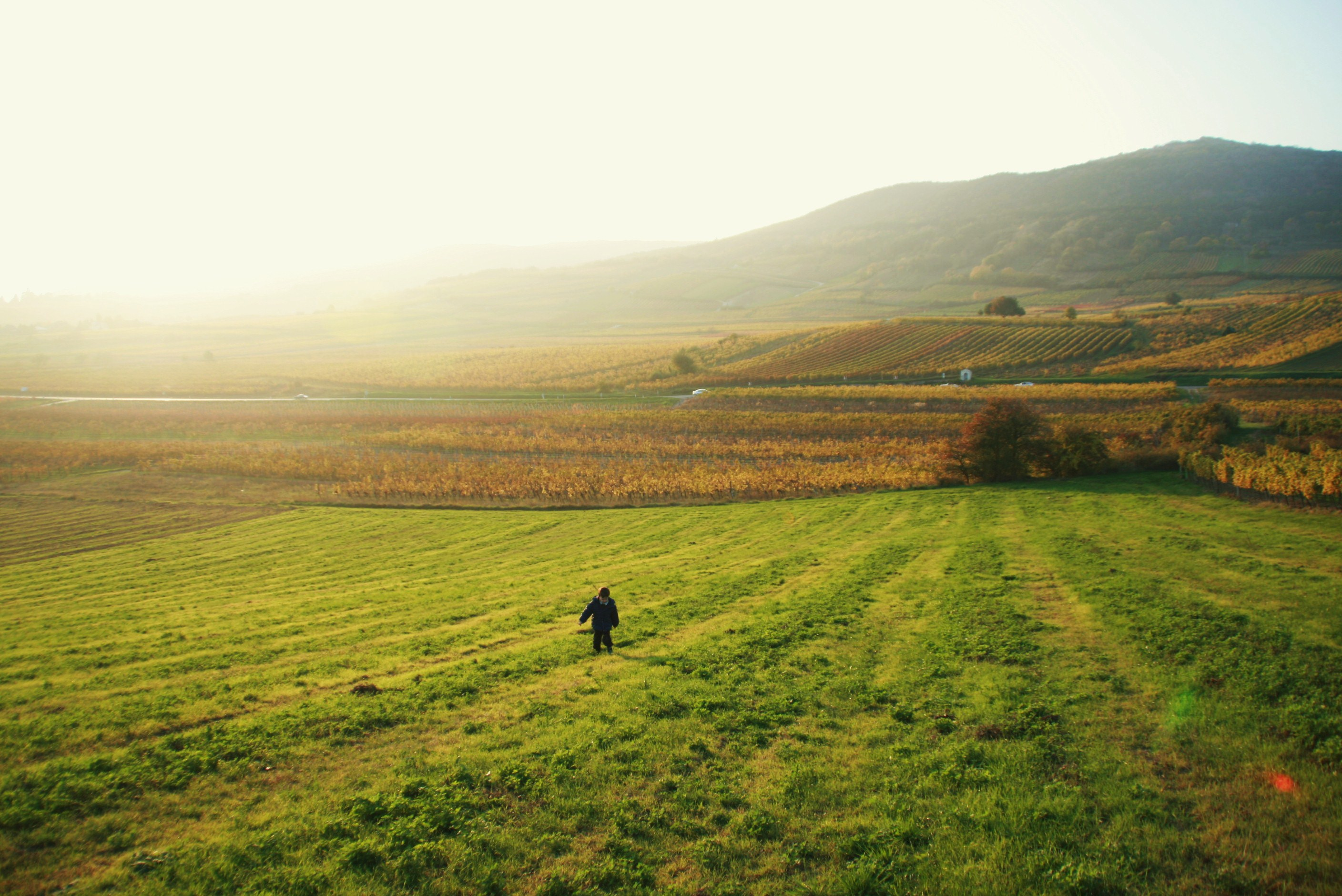
Ancient vineyards of Lilienfelderhof and neighbours

It is of historical interest to note that, until its suppression in 1782, the Kartause Gaming (Gaming Charterhouse) (now 99-year leaseholder of Domaene Lilienfeld / Lilienfelderhof through the Kartause Gaming Private Foundation) itself owned extensive vineyards in and around Pfaffstätten. Indeed, so strong was the presence of many of the great Austrian monasteries (e.g. Heiligenkreuz Abbey, Klosterneuburg Monastery, Melk Abbey, Schottenstift, in addition to the Kartause Gaming, Kartause Mauerbach, Lilienfeld Abbey, as well as the German Order / Teutonic Knights and the Augustinians) that a town was named after them, i.e.“Pfaffstätten”, literally the “city of the “Pfaffen”—“Pfaffen” being a colloquial term for clerics.

== Winemaking ==
Grape varieties from the extended Burgundian family have traditionally flourished in the gentle warmth of the Thermenregion (it was most likely Cistercian monks in the Thermenregion who originally introduced the Pinot noir grape to Austria from the Order's motherhouse in Burgundy) and the contemporary revitalisation of Domaene Lilienfeld / Lilienfelder Hof foresees a viticultural focus on these varieties, complemented by the autochthonous Rotgipfler.

Currently vineyards belonging to Domaene Lilienfeld are planted with Rotgipfler (a cross between Traminer, a parent of the Burgundian Pinot noir, and the Austrian Roter Veltliner), Weissburgunder (a.k.a. “Pinot blanc”, a mutation of the Burgundian Pinot gris), Zweigelt (a cross between St. Laurent, related to Pinot noir, and Blaufränkisch), as well as Zierfandler, Riesling, Welschriesling, and Neuburger. Most vineyards are south-facing.

The arrival of the Cistercian monks in the twelfth and thirteenth centuries was, relative to the remarkable antiquity of the region's viticulture, a recent development. Roman legionnaires stationed in Carnuntum and Vindobona 2,000 years ago encountered an intact tradition of winemaking to the south of Vienna, which they subsequently improved through the introduction of superior Italian grape varieties.
