= Hohenberg Castle =

Coordinates: 47.9041°N 15.6232°E

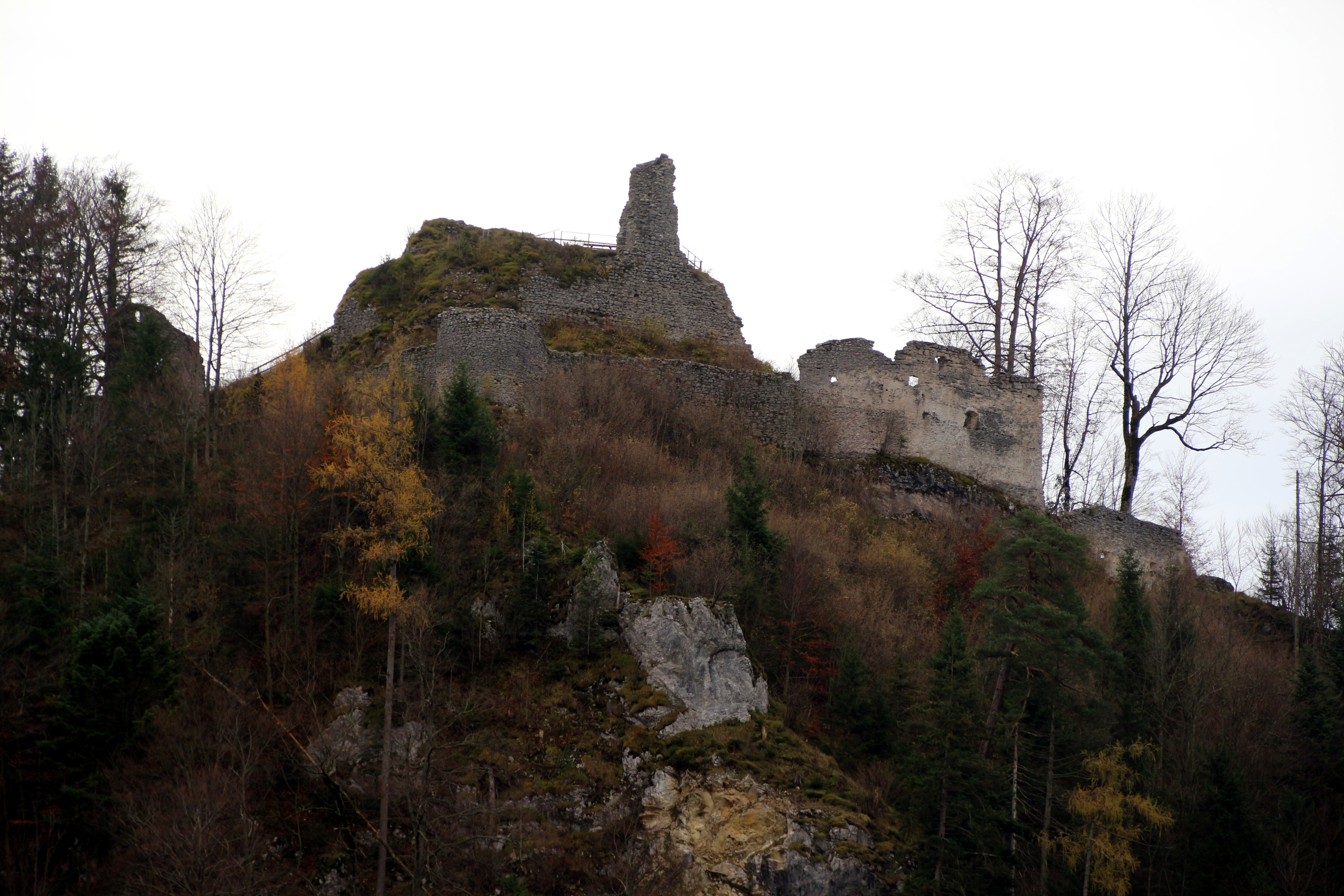
Burgruine Hohenberg in Hohenberg, 2017

Hohenberg Castle (German: Burgruine Hohenberg) is a ruined hilltop castle in the market town of Hohenberg in southern Lower Austria.

== History ==
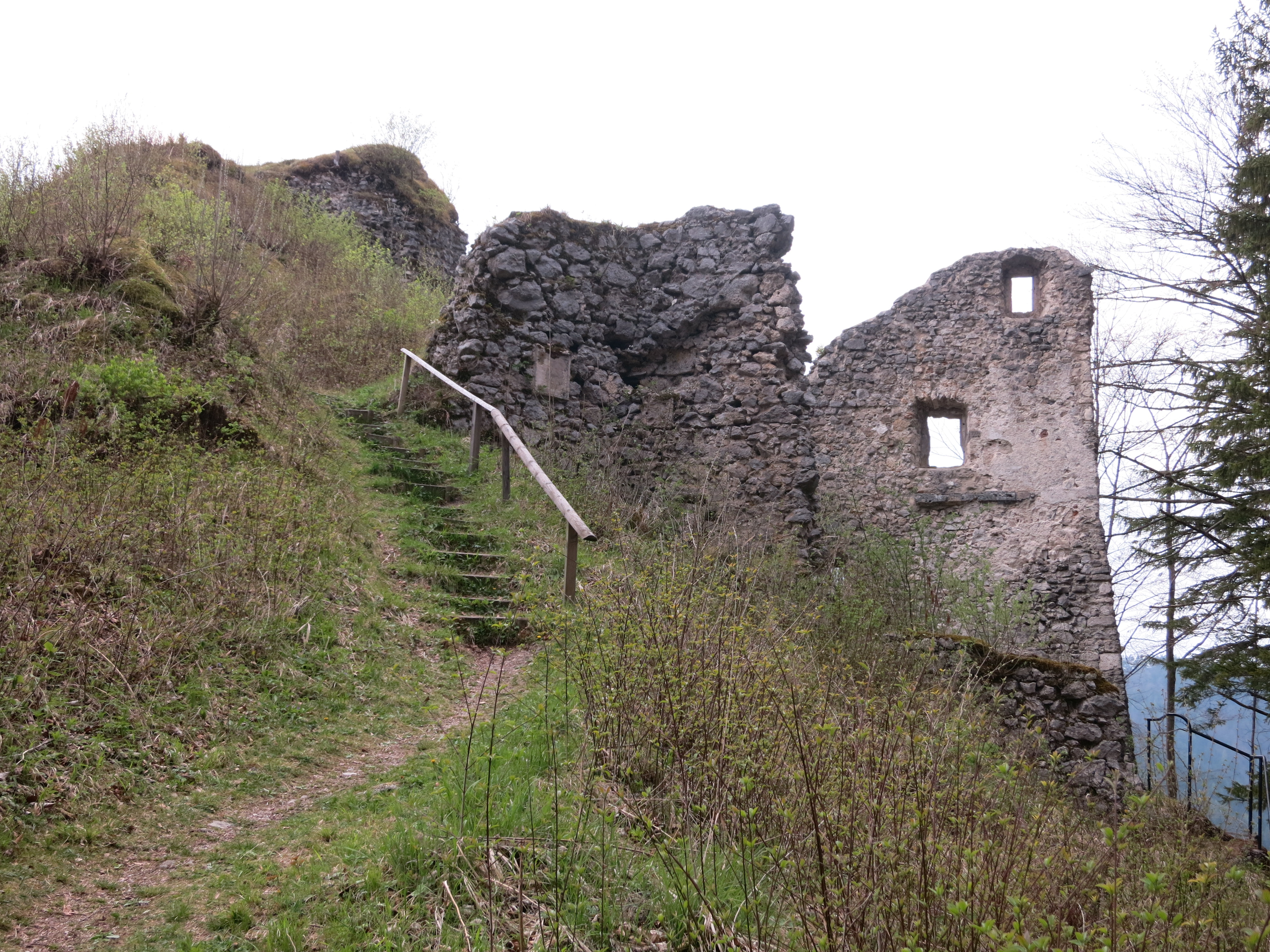
Photo from the inner courtyard, 2014

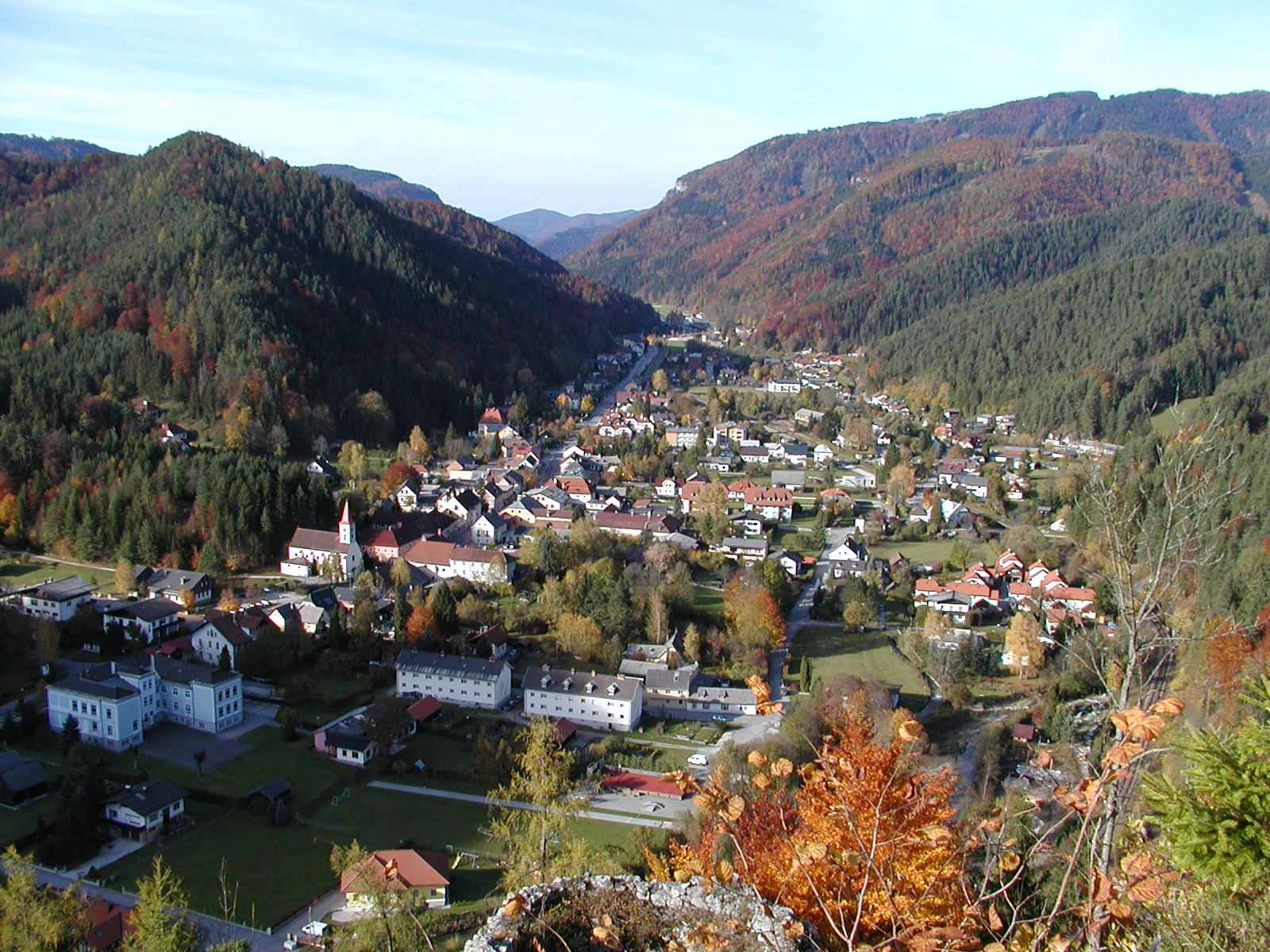
View from the ruins, 2004

Hohenberg Castle was built in the 13th century by Dietrich of Hohenburg, son of the ministerial (servile knightly) Leutold von Hohenstaff (later Leutold von Altenburg). With the construction of the castle, Dietrich, along with his brother Heinrich, became the founders of the Hohenberg family, who in turn were part of the Hohenstaff-Altenburg-Hohenberg dynasty.

In 1407, when a civil war broke out in Austria between the dukes Leopold of Habsburg and Ernest of Habsburg over the guardianship of the then underage Duke Albrecht V, the then lord of the castle, Hans I of Hohenberg, sided with the latter. Hans I also forced the Lilienfeld Abbey to side with his duke. When Leopold sent a punitive expedition to Hohenberg under the leadership of the Moravian knight Sokol, Hans I fled and hid in the abbey. Sokol limited himself to confiscating the Hohenbergs' horses, but this story ended unfavorably for the Lilienfeld Abbey. Hans I's support against Sokol was not enough for Sokol, which is why he plundered the abbey a short time later in revenge.

With the death of the last Hohenberger, Erasmus von Hohenberg in 1529, the castle became the property of Wilhelm von Roggendorf, who was married to Erasmus' daughter, Anna von Hohenberg. After changing hands several times, it came into the possession of Sebald Pögl the Younger, Baron of Reifenstein and Arenberg, in 1535.

=== Jörger period ===
In 1589 Baron Bernhard von Jörger acquired the lordship. They were a Protestant noble family from Upper Austria who owned many properties in the area in the 16th century, including Bergau Castle in Rohrbach an der Gölsen. The Jörgers' power in the upper Traisental had grown to such an extent that they were deemed a threat to Lilienfeld Abbey, considered the largest and most powerful local landowner at the time. In the course of the Counter-Reformation, the Jörgers' estates were confiscated by imperial decree in 1619, including Hohenberg. Emperor Ferdinand II sent an army under Hans Balthasar von Hoyos against Hohenberg and the castle was conquered by the imperial troops, but badly damaged.

=== Hoyos period ===
After the defeat of the Jörgers, Hans Balthasar von Hoyos received Hohenberg Castle as a fief, and in 1627 it became his personal property. However, as the Hoyos family did not live in the Traisental, the castle fell into disrepair. Around 40 years later, Hohenberg is shown as half ruined in the Vischer engraving (1672). The outbuildings, the round towers and the defensive wall were still intact at this time.
