= Burgruine Reifenstein =

Ruined castle in Austria

Coordinates: 47.2125°N 14.6008°E

- Styria, Austria
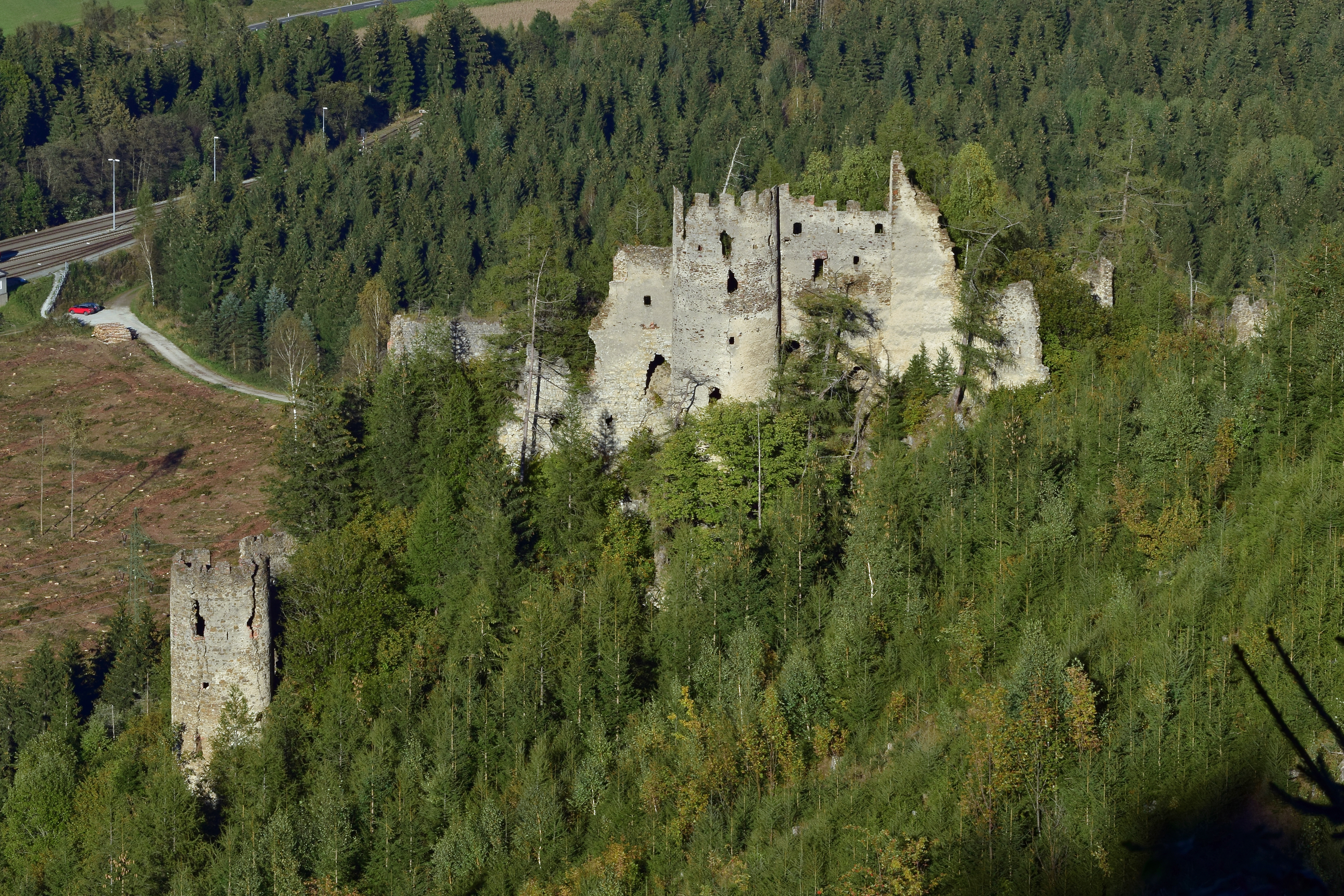

Site information
- Type: Hill castle

Site history
- Built: 1145

Burgruine Reifenstein is a castle in Styria, Austria, situated close to the village of Pöls.

== History ==
The castle was most likely built in the 12th century by the Reifenstein family, a branch of the House of Liechtenstein and further expanded in the 13th and 14th century. The Reifenstein castle was leined by Rudolf II, Duke of Austria to families under his service, who took sovereignty of the estate. The castle sustained massive structural damage during the Hussite Wars by the Bohemians in 1415. During the 15th century, the castle changed ownership several times, before being sold in 1521 to Sebald Pögl from Thörl, who rebuilt it in the Renaissance style. Finally, in 1698, the castle changed owners one last time, coming into the possession of the Schwarzenberg family, who own it to this day, along with the surrounding forest.

The castle remained inhabited until 1809 when, in order to avoid French troops being quartered there during the Napoleonic Wars, the roof was removed, which led to an accelerated rate of decay.

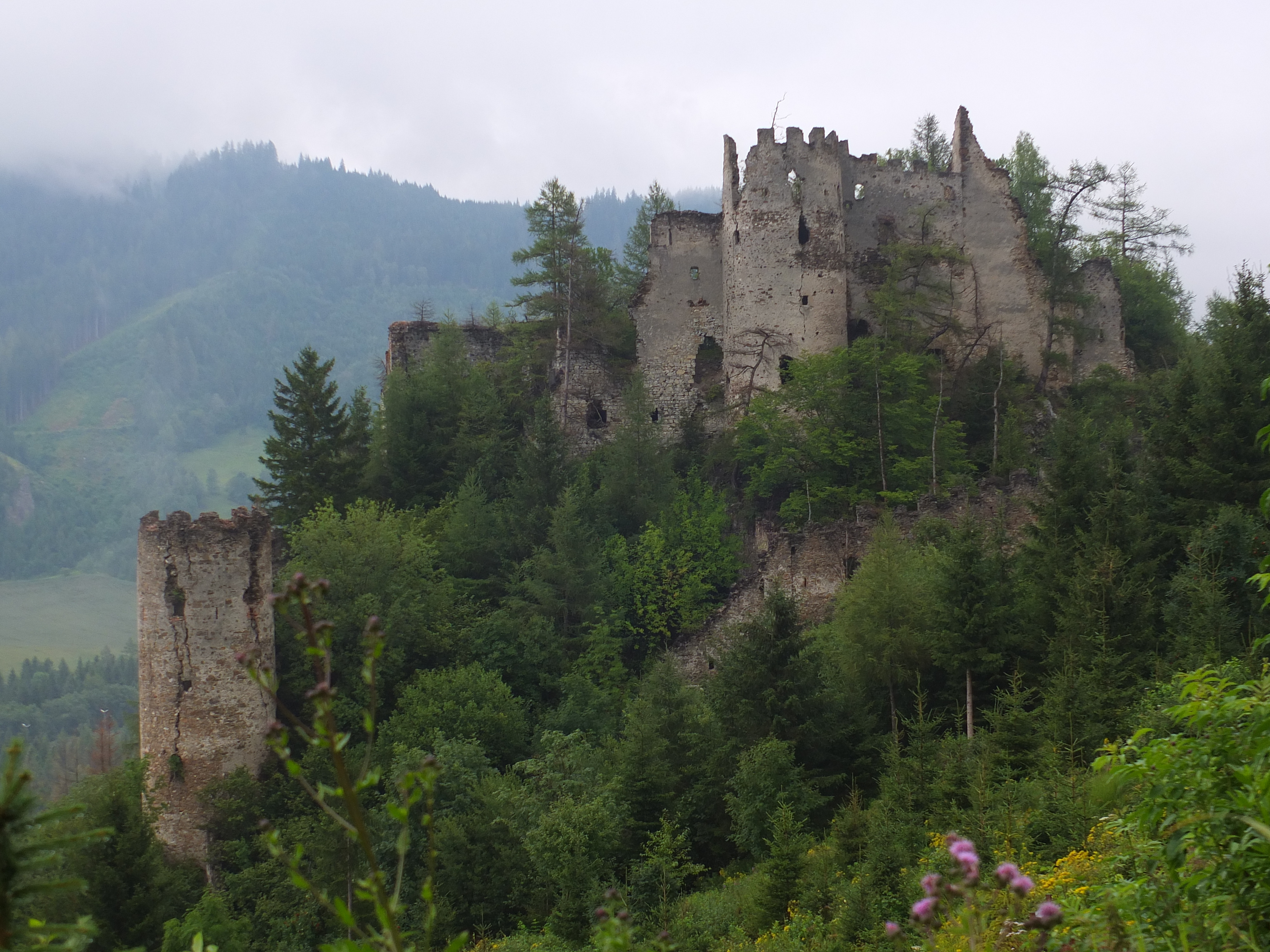
Reifenstein Castle

== Today ==
Several trails that lead to the castle ruins are maintained.

== See also ==
- List of castles in Austria
- VR-Tour through the castle ruins on burgen.erhartc.net
