= Lembach =

- Commune
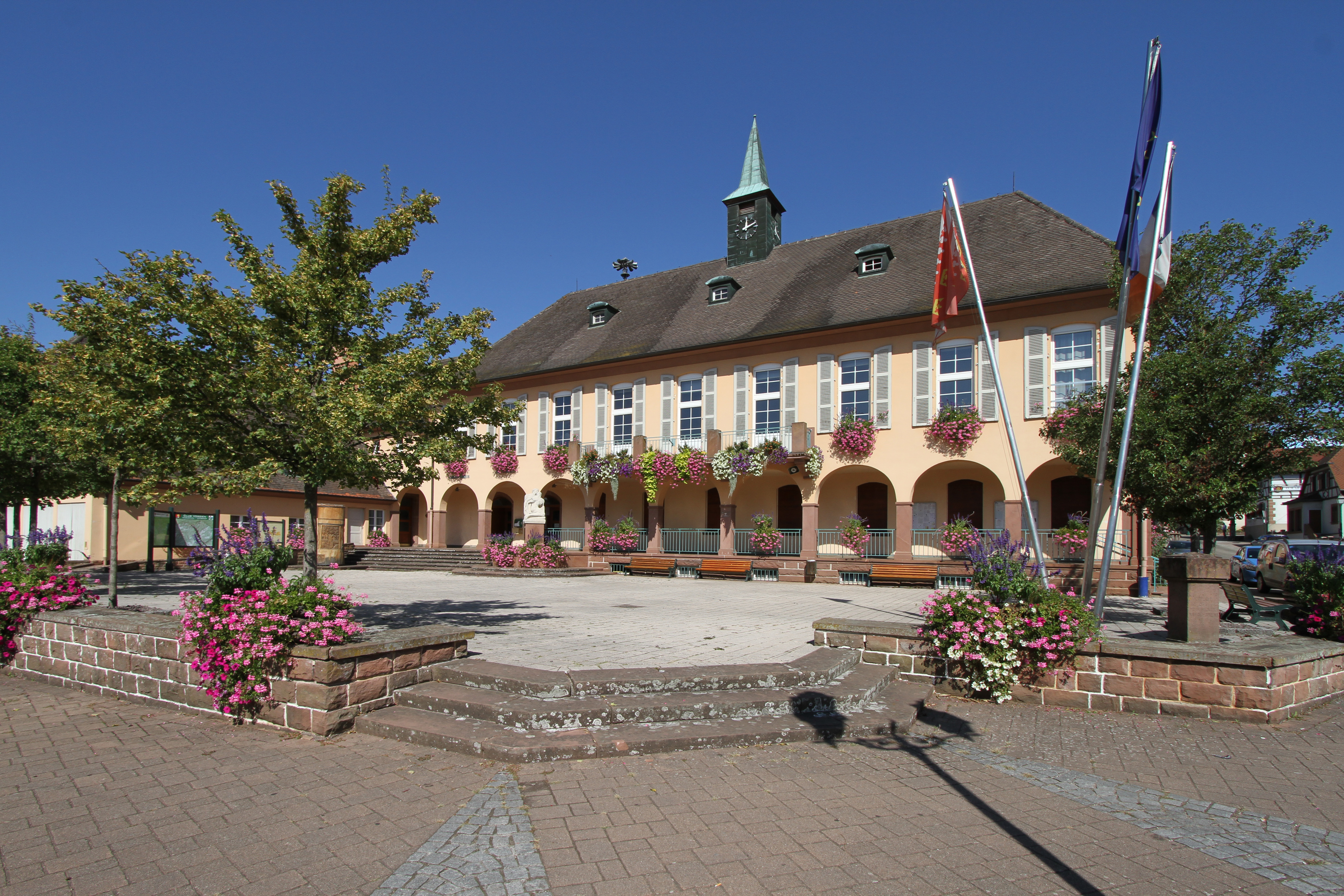
- The town hall in Lembach

- Coat of arms
- Location of Lembach
- Location within France Location within Grand Est
- Coordinates: 49°01′N 7°47′E
- Country: France
- Region: Grand Est
- Department: Bas-Rhin
- Arrondissement: Haguenau-Wissembourg
- Canton: Reichshoffen
- Intercommunality: Sauer-Pechelbronn

Government
  - Mayor (2020–2026): Christian Trautmann
- Area^{1}: 48.89 km^{2} (18.88 sq mi)
- Highest elevation: 551 m (1,808 ft)
- Lowest elevation: 177 m (581 ft)
- Population (2023): 1,490
  - Density: 30.5/km^{2} (78.9/sq mi)
- Time zone: UTC+01:00 (CET)
  - Summer (DST): UTC+02:00 (CEST)
- INSEE/Postal code: 67263 /67510
- ^{1} French Land Register data, which excludes lakes, ponds, glaciers > 1 km^{2} (0.386 sq mi or 247 acres) and river estuaries.

Lembach is a commune in the Bas-Rhin department and Grand Est region of north-eastern France.

== Etymology ==
The toponym Lembach is of Germanic origin, cognate to modern German Lehm, denoting clay. The Germanic hydronym *-bak(i) entered the French language via High German, and took on two forms: the Germanic form -bach and Romantic -bais.

== Geography ==
Lembach lies in the Sauer valley, surrounded by the woods and sandstone cliffs of the Palatinate Forest-North Vosges Biosphere Reserve. It is located on Departmental Road 3 which runs from Wissembourg, 12 km to the east of Lembach, to the north-western tip of Bas-Rhin and the onward route to Bitche in the department of Moselle. The German frontier lies some 5 km to the north.

The commune, which covers an extensive land area, much of it uninhabitable owing to the topography, also includes the small village of Mattstall and the hamlet of Pfaffenbronn.

== History ==
In September 1972 the commune of Lembach was merged with the neighbouring village of Mattstall to the south. Mattstall retains the semi-independent status of an associated commune.

== Notable people ==
- Author and doctor Paul Bertololy lived in Lembach and died there in 1972. (At the time of his birth at Frankenthal in 1892, Lembach was a part of Germany, and German was the mother tongue in which Bertololy wrote.)
- Claude-Hélène Perrot (1928-2019), historian and Africanist

== Landmarks ==
- Fleckenstein castle
- Frœnsbourg castle
- Maginot line fortifications, known as Ouvrage Four-à-Chaux

== See also ==
- Communes of the Bas-Rhin department
