= Château de Fleckenstein =

Ruined castle in Bas-Rhin, France

Coordinates: 49°02′41″N 7°46′19″E

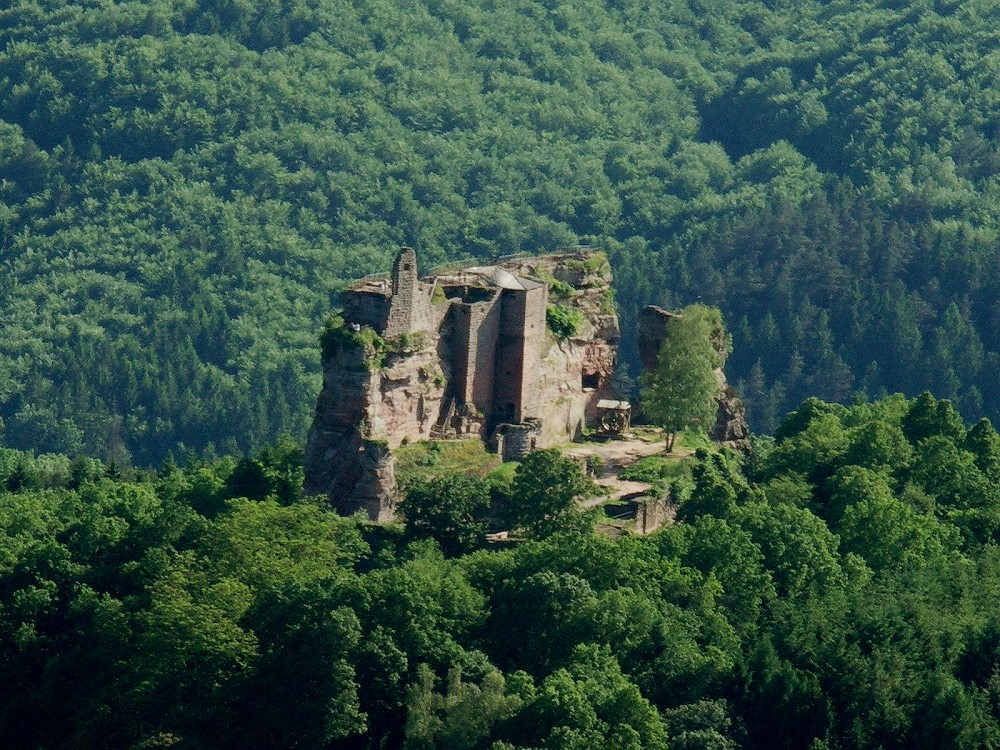
The castle seen from Hohenbourg

Location of the Château de Fleckenstein in Alsace

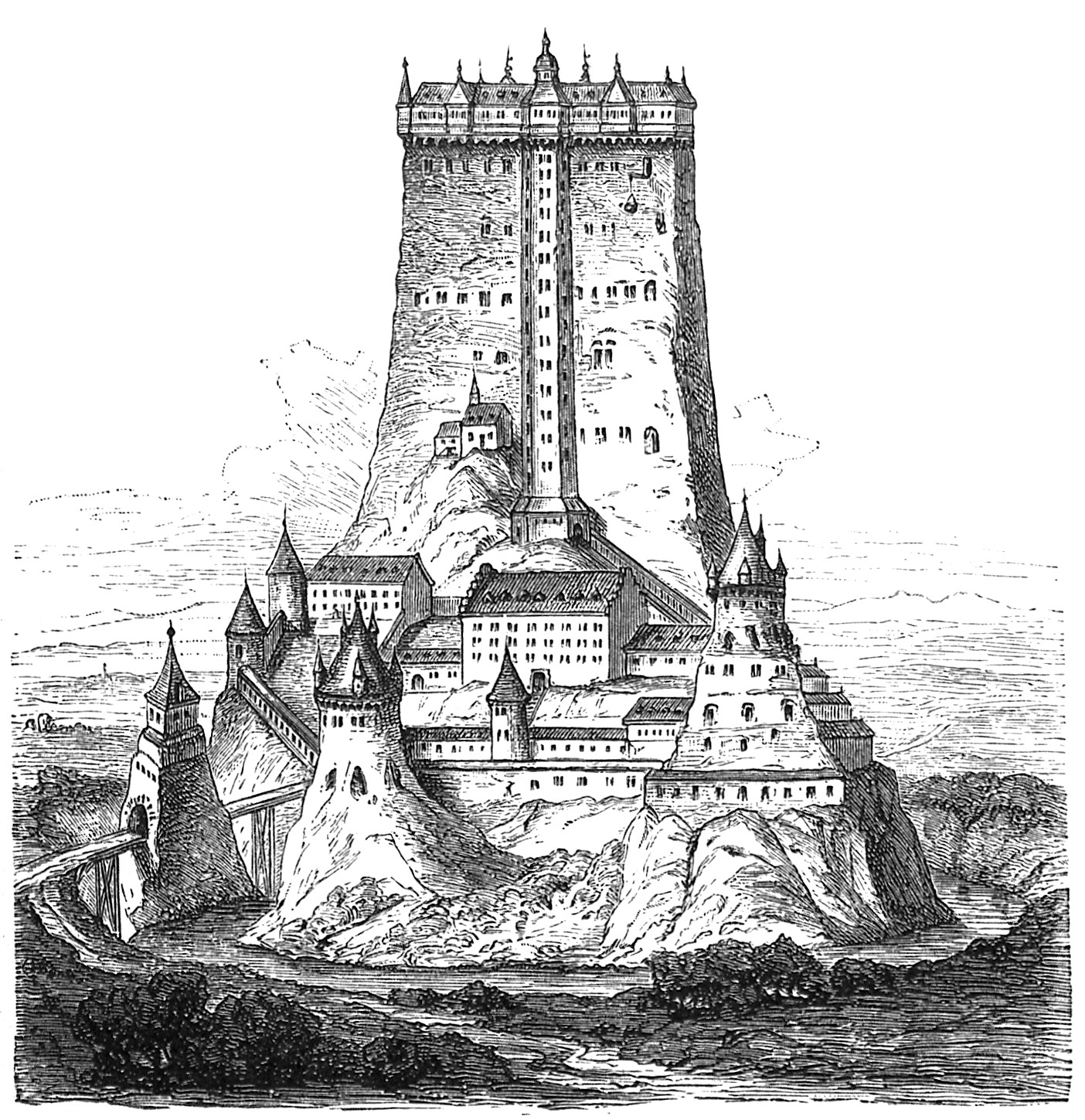
Drawing of Fleckenstein by Specklin

Château de Fleckenstein is a ruined castle in the commune of Lembach, in the Bas-Rhin département of France. This fortress, built in the shape of a 52 m-long (171 ft) boat, has a long history. The castle was built on a sandstone summit in the Middle Ages. An ingenious system for collecting rainwater fed a cistern and a hoist allowed water and other loads to be moved to the upper floors.

== History ==
A castle is known to have existed on the site in 1165. It is named after the Fleckenstein family, owners until 1720 when it passed to the Vitzthum d'Egersberg family. The family had had a lordship that consisted of four separate small territories in the Bas-Rhin département. In 1807, it passed to J.-L. Apffel and in 1812 to General Harty, baron of Pierrebourg (the French for Fleckenstein: stone town). In 1919, it became the property of the French state.

The rock and the castle have been modified and modernised many times. Of the Romanesque castle, remains include steps cut into the length of the rock, troglodyte rooms and a cistern. The lower part of the well tower dates from the 13th or 14th century, the rest from the 15th and 16th. The inner door in the lower courtyard carries the faded inscription 1407 (or 1423); the outer door 1429 (or 1428). The stairwell tower is decorated with the arms of Friedrich von Fleckenstein (died 1559) and those of his second wife, Catherine von Cronberg (married 1537).

The 16th-century castle, modernised between 1541 and 1570, was shared between the two branches of the Fleckenstein family. Documents from the 16th century describe the castle and a watercolour copy of a 1562 tapestry shows its appearance in this period. Towards the end of the 17th-century Fleckenstein was captured twice by French troops. In 1674 the capture was achieved by forces under Marshall Vauban, who encountered no resistance from the defenders. The castle was nevertheless completely destroyed in 1689 by General Melac. Major restoration work was carried out after 1870, around 1908 and again since 1958.

== Location ==
The castle is located between Lembach to the south and Hirschtal to the north, only about 200 meters to the southeast of the present French frontier with Germany, at a height of about 370 meters above mean sea level. The nearest more substantial town is Wissembourg, approximately 20 km / 12 miles to the east. The castle is accessible by road or via (well established) hiking trails.

== Recognition ==
Château de Fleckenstein has been listed as a monument historique by the French Ministry of Culture since 1898.

== See also ==
- List of castles in France
