= Karin M. Hehenberger =

Swedish physician

- Education: M.D., Ph.D.
- Alma mater: Karolinska Institutet
- Occupations: Physician, Business Executive
- Known for: Diabetes Expert
- Website: lyfebulb.com

Karin M. Hehenberger (born 1973) is a Swedish physician, investor, business executive, and diabetes expert, known for her work in the field of biotechnology. She has written numerous articles on biotechnology that have been published in peer review journals and worked as an executive for different biotechnology companies and investment firms. She is a faculty member in the department of Molecular Medicine at the Karolinska Institute where she also obtained her M.D. and a Ph.D. in molecular medicine. She has lectured on the topics of autoimmune diseases, diabetes, molecular medicine and industry challenges as well as provided commentary for Fox News, Good Morning America Health, New York One, the USA Today and Forbes.

== Early life and education ==
Hehenberger is originally from Sweden and played for the Swedish National tennis team. At the age of 16, she was playing tennis internationally when she was diagnosed with Type 1 diabetes, ending her tennis career. Her experience with diabetes led her to pursue a career fighting autoimmune diseases. Hehenberger attended the Karolinska Institutet in Stockholm, Sweden, where she earned her M.D. and Ph.D. in molecular medicine. She went on to a post-doctoral fellowship with the Joslin Diabetes Center at Harvard Medical School.

In 2009, she received a kidney transplant from her father, after her kidneys had less than 10 percent total capacity, and in 2010 she received a transplanted cadaver pancreas. The kidney surgery saved her from needing dialysis, while the pancreas surgery rendered her free of diabetes, no longer needing to inject insulin.

== Career ==
Hehenberger's career has been spent both in research and on the business side of medicine. She began her career as a consultant at McKinsey & Company, where she consulted on projects relating to healthcare, with an emphasis on diabetes. Hehenberger was also a senior analyst at two multi-billion dollar hedgefunds in the U.S. and Europe, and a partner in a venture capital firm in Europe, gaining experience in public and private equity. She was also a member of the senior management team for Eyetech Pharmaceuticals, which she helped take public in 2004.

Hehenberger was also previously the Vice President of Metabolic Strategy and Business Development at Johnson & Johnson. She led the Johnson & Johnson Metabolic Task Force and was responsible for developing the company's strategies for its metabolic disease efforts. She joined the Juvenile Diabetes Research Foundation (JDRF) in December 2009 as its Senior Vice President for Strategic Alliances. Following her time at the JDRF, Hehenberger served as the Executive Vice President of Scientific Affairs and Chief Medical Officer at Coronado Biosciences, Inc., a publicly traded biopharmaceutical company that develops immunotherapy biologic agents for autoimmune diseases and cancer. During her career, she has written articles in peer review journals and has also been a panelist for medical conferences, including BioEurope, MassBio, BioCEO, Alliance for Regenerative Medicine, BioPharm America and the Swedish-American Life Science Summit.

Karin Hehenberger sits on the Board of the public Swedish drug development company Diamyd Medical https://www.diamyd.com/Default.aspx, which is developing an antigen-specific precision medicine immunotherapy for the prevention and treatment of Type 1 Diabetes and is conducting a registrational Phase 3 clinical trial in the United States and Europe.

=== Select publications ===
- 1999, Impaired proliferation and increased L-lactate production of dermal fibroblasts in the GK-rat, a spontaneous model of non-insulin dependent diabetes mellitus
- 1998, Fibroblasts derived from human chronic diabetic wounds have a decreased proliferation rate, which is recovered by the addition of heparin
- 1998, Inhibited proliferation of fibroblasts derived from chronic diabetic wounds and normal dermal fibroblasts treated with high glucose is associated with increased formation of l-lactate
- 1997, High glucose-induced growth factor resistance in human fibroblasts can be reversed by antioxidants and protein kinase C-inhibitors
- 1996, Long-term treatment of Swiss 3T3 fibroblasts with dexamethasone attenuates MAP kinase activation induced by insulin-like growth factor-I (IGF-I)
