= Hohenberger =

Hohenberger is a toponymic surname of German origin, referring to someone from any of multiple places named Hohenberg, or someone who lived one a mountain or large hill, derived from Middle High German hōch, meaning 'high', and berg, meaning 'mountain hill'. Notable people with the surname include:

- Herbert Hohenberger (born 1969), Austrian ice hockey player
- John Friedrich (fraudster) (real name Johann Hohenberger; 1950–1991), German-Australian fraudster
- Kurt Hohenberger (1908–1979), German jazz trumpeter
- Martin Hohenberger (born 1977), Austrian ice hockey player
- Robert Hohenberger (1943–1978), American kidnapper, serial rapist and suspected serial killer

== See also ==
- Hohenberg (disambiguation)
