= Cargill Cotton =

American cotton company

- Company type: Private
- Industry: Consumer services
- Predecessors: Ralli Brothers and Coney,
- Headquarters: Memphis, Tennessee
- Area served: Worldwide
- Products: Cotton
- Number of employees: over 1,000
- Parent: Cargill
- Website: cargillcotton.com

Cargill Cotton is a cotton trading company with headquarters in Memphis, Tennessee. Its parent company Cargill, Inc., a commodities trader and producer based in Minneapolis, became one of the world's largest traders of cotton after acquiring Hohenberg Brothers in 1976.

== History ==
Cargill Cotton’s roots in cotton merchandising trace back to 1818, when John and Eustace Ralli began trading cotton and other commodities in London. Over the next thirty years, the brothers' business interests began to focus predominantly on cotton from the East Indies. In 1851, Ralli Brothers was incorporated with offices in the United Kingdom, Calcutta, and Bombay.

In 1865, another cotton trading company, Smith, Coney and Barrat, was founded and soon became very successful. By the middle of the twentieth century, the firms had grown to become two of the United Kingdom's leading cotton merchants and in 1962 the two companies agreed to merge, forming Ralli Brothers and Coney.

Shortly after the formation of Smith, Coney, and Barrat, Adolphe and Morris Hohenberg formed their partnership in the United States to trade cotton and dry goods in 1879. Over the next hundred years, Hohenberg Brothers Cotton Company and Ralli Brothers and Coney grew to become two of the largest and most successful in the United States and the world.

At the time Cargill acquired Hohenberg Bros. Company in 1976, Ralli Bros. and Coney and Hohenberg each had established themselves as global leaders in the industry.

In 1981 Ralli Brothers and Coney was sold to Cargill Inc. of Minneapolis, Minnesota, USA. Ralli Brothers and Coney's strengths were in the trading of cotton from the Indian sub-continent and Africa, which complemented the fields of expertise, which Cargill Inc. already possessed through their Memphis, Tennessee, USA based cotton-trading company, Hohenberg Brothers Inc.

From these two small family ventures evolved one of the largest cotton merchandising concerns in the history of the world.

In 2002, after over 20 years of operating under both the Hohenberg and Ralli names, the name of the entire cotton operation was changed to Cargill Cotton. Thus the combination of strengths became complete as the cotton business unit assumed the name of its 100 billion-dollar parent company.
