= Lilienfeld Abbey =

Cistercian monastery in Lilienfeld, Austria

Coordinates: 48.01298°N 15.59865°E

Aerial view of Lilienfeld Abbey from the southwest

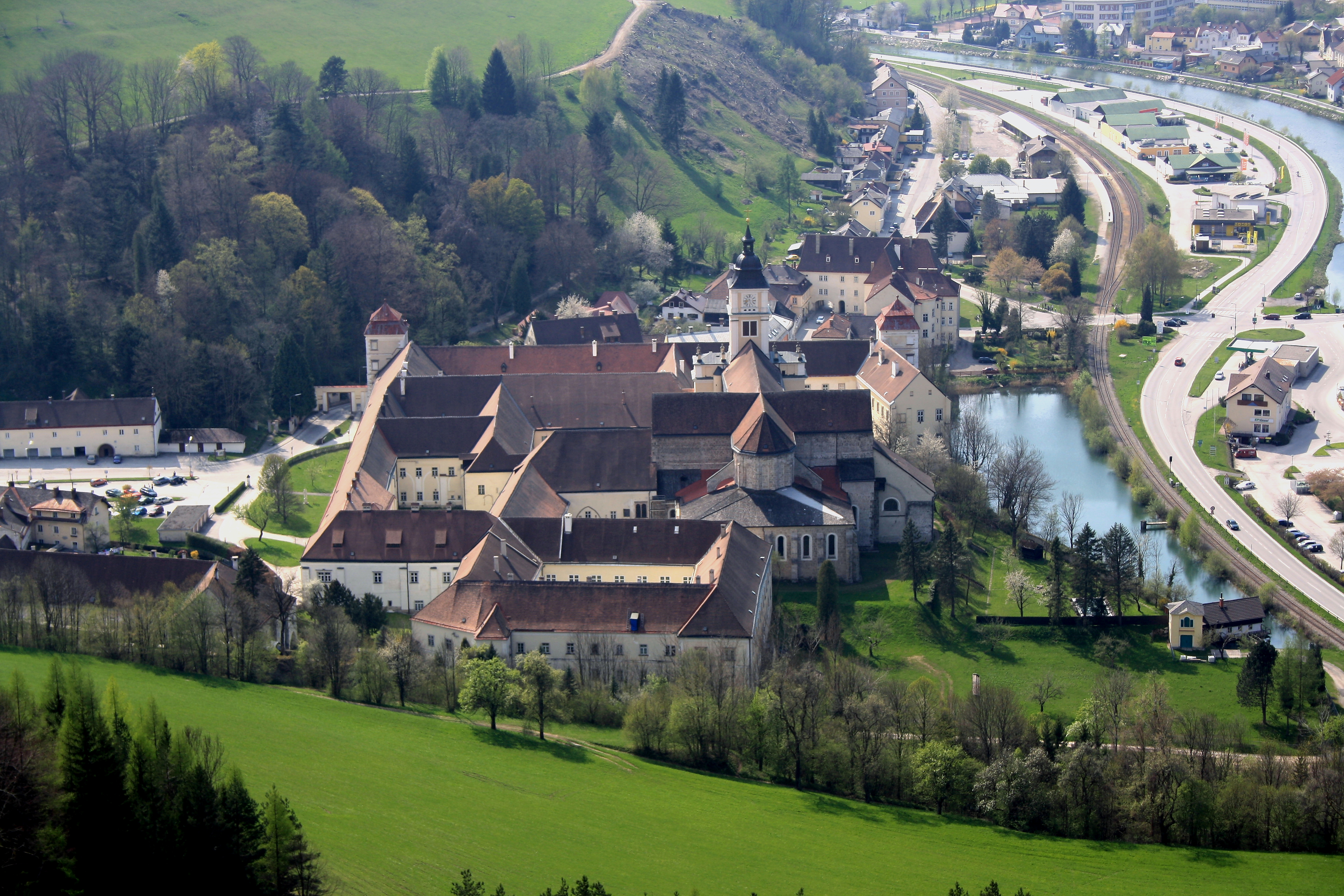
Lilienfeld Abbey seen from the east

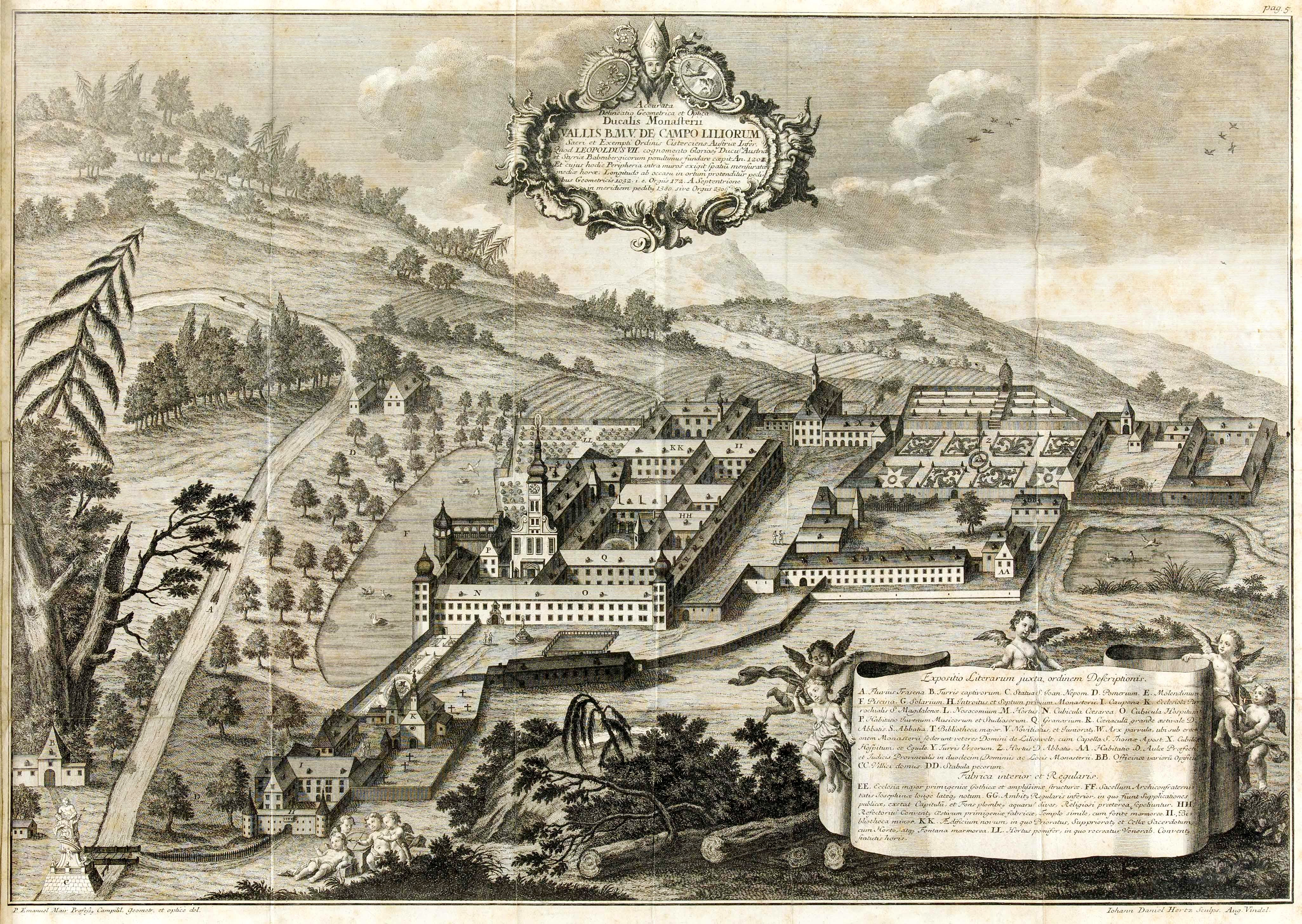
View of the Lilienfeld Cistercian Abbey, 1747

Lilienfeld Abbey (German: Stift Lilienfeld) is a Cistercian monastery in Lilienfeld in Lower Austria, south of Sankt Pölten.

== History ==
It was founded in 1202 by Leopold VI, Duke of Austria and Styria, as a daughter house of Heiligenkreuz Abbey. Successive abbots acted as councillors to the rulers of Austria, and the abbey became wealthy as a result of this valuable connection.

Abbot Matthew Kollweis (1650–1695) turned the monastery into a fortress during the Turkish advance against Vienna in 1683, installing a garrison and giving shelter to a large number of fugitives. In the 17th century the medieval buildings were extended by Baroque additions. In the first half of the 18th century the tower, library and church interior and furnishings were also refurbished in the Baroque style.

The abbey was suppressed by Emperor Joseph II in 1789, but although the library, archives and portable valuables were removed, on the death of Joseph II it was reopened by Emperor Leopold II as early as 1790.

In 1810 much of the abbey was destroyed in a fire, but was rebuilt under Abbot Johann Ladislaus Pyrker, who later became the Patriarch of Venice (1820–26) and eventually Archbishop of Eger.

In 1976 Pope Paul VI declared the abbey church of Lilienfeld a "basilica minor".

The community belongs to the Cistercians of the Common Observance and is part of the Austrian Congregation.

From the early 1980s Lilienfeld Abbey has hosted the Sommerakademie Lilienfeld, a summer music academy with master classes by renowned teachers. The courses are held during two weeks in July, and usually 5 concerts are performed by the participants. In 2008 alone, over 160 people from 27 countries took part in the activities of the Sommerakademie Lilienfeld.

== Winemaking ==
As part of his endowment, Duke Leopold VI, Duke of Austria, granted the Abbey lands in and around Pfaffstätten, between Baden and Gumpoldskirchen, upon which the monks erected a walled estate (known as a "monastic grange"). This estate, the Lilienfelderhof, comprising a gothic church, manor house, and numerous other buildings, was acquired in 2006 by the Kartause Gaming Private Foundation via a 99-year leasehold. The property and its vineyards are currently in the process of being restored and revitalised.

== Burials ==
- Leopold VI, Duke of Austria
- Margaret, Duchess of Austria
- Cymburgis of Masovia

== Cross of honour ==
- Cross of Honour of the Abbot of Lilienfeld, founded 1980

== Gallery ==
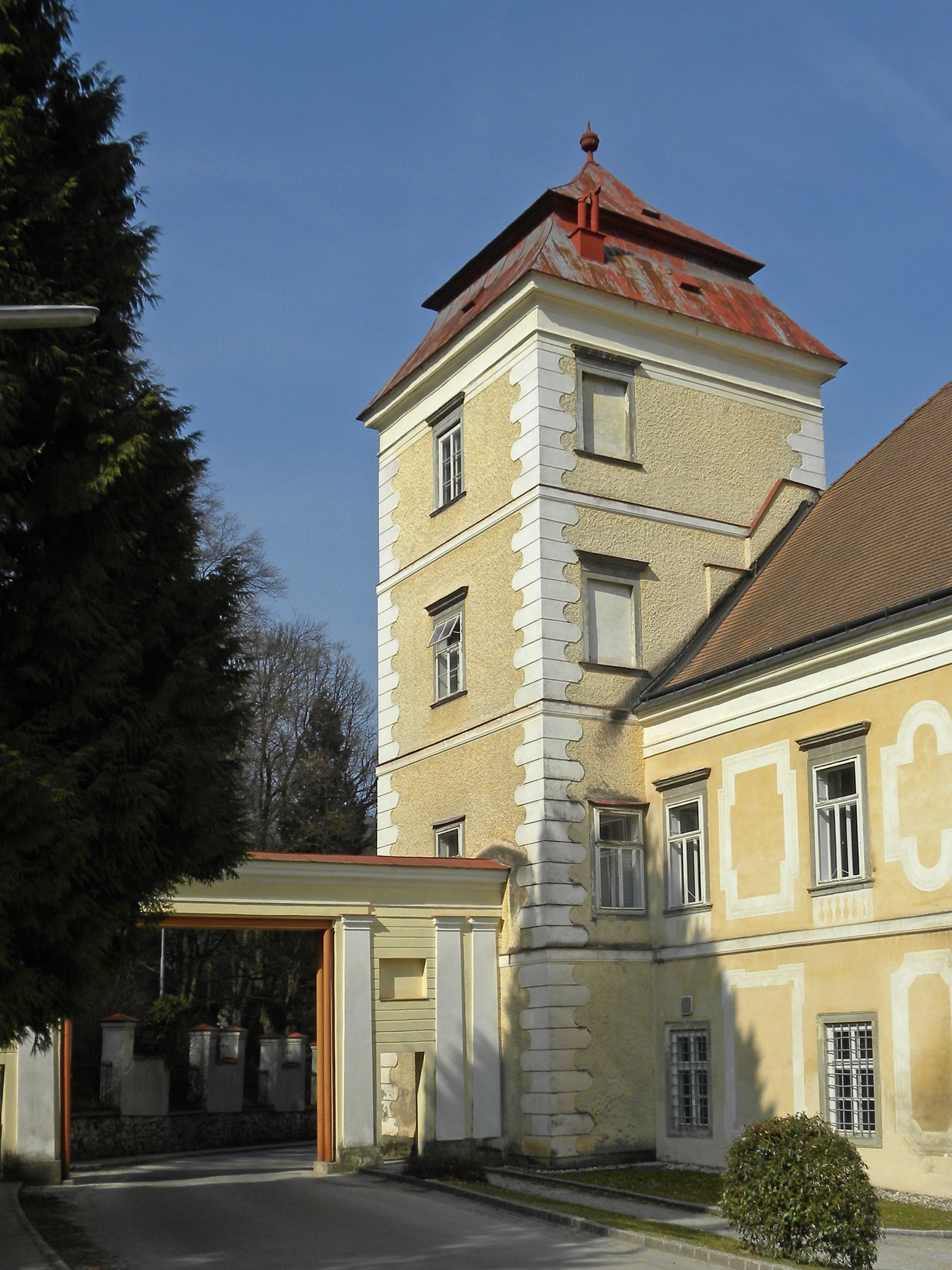
Lilienfeld Abbey

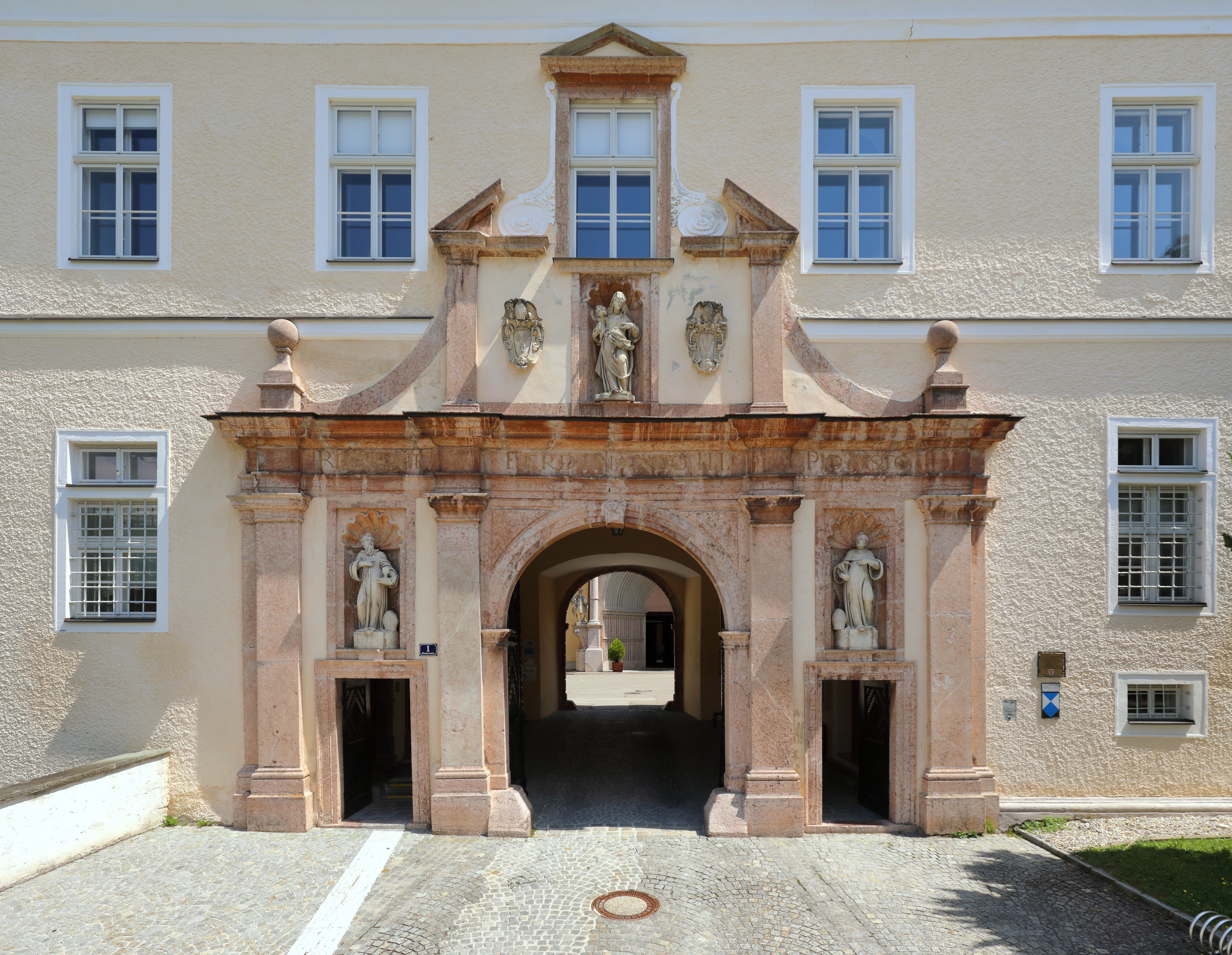
Main portal

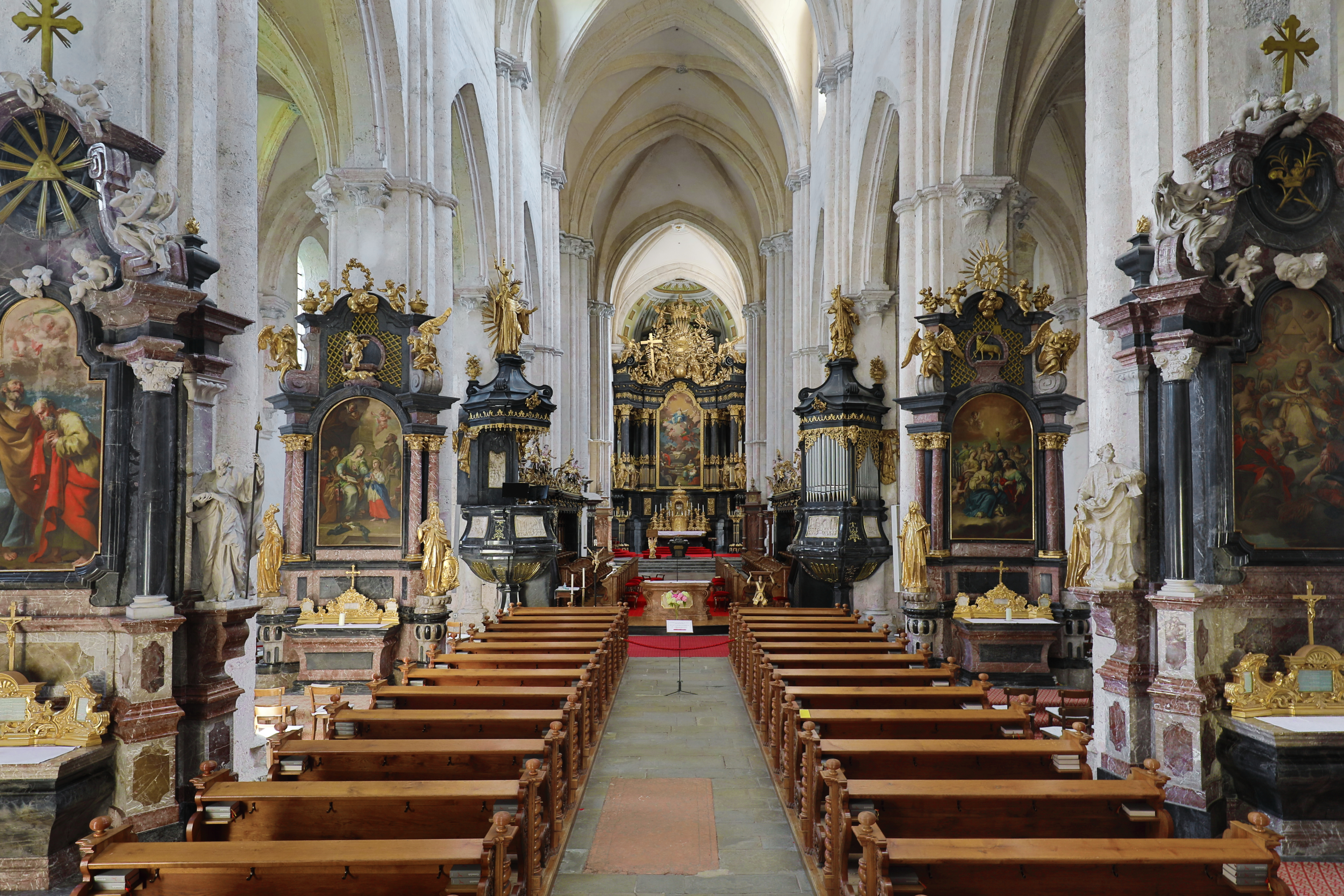
Interior view of the Abbey Church

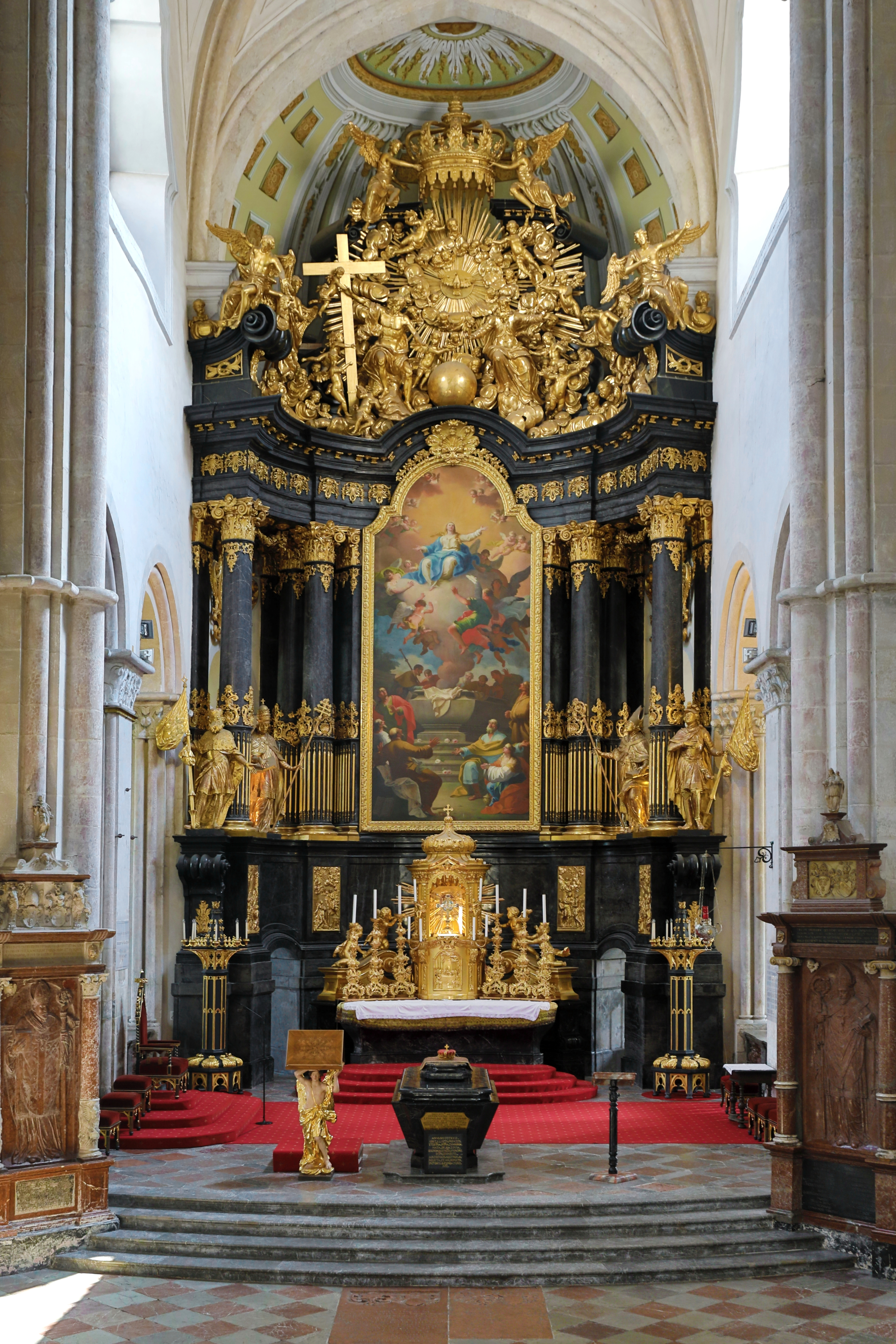
High altar

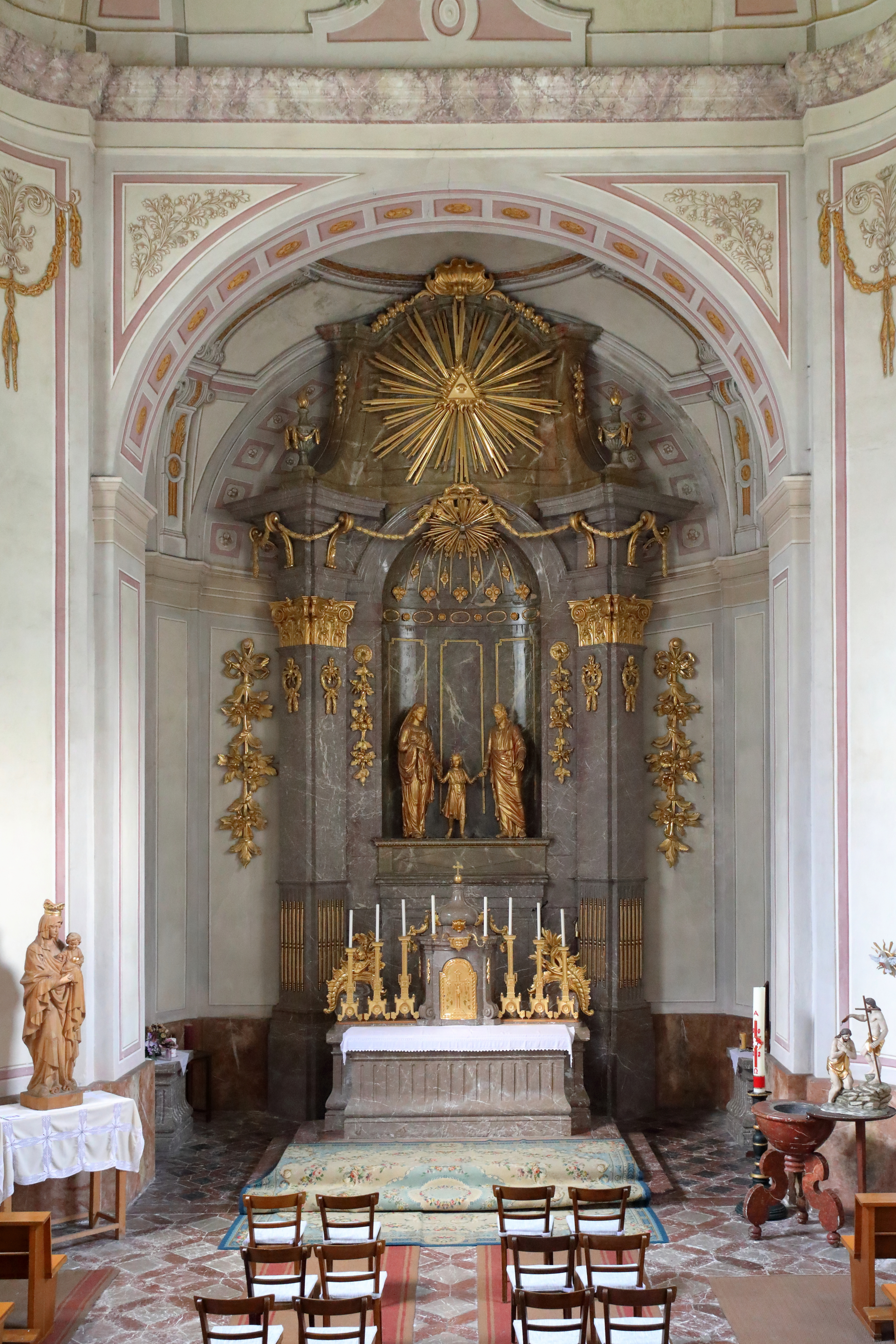
Josefi Chapel

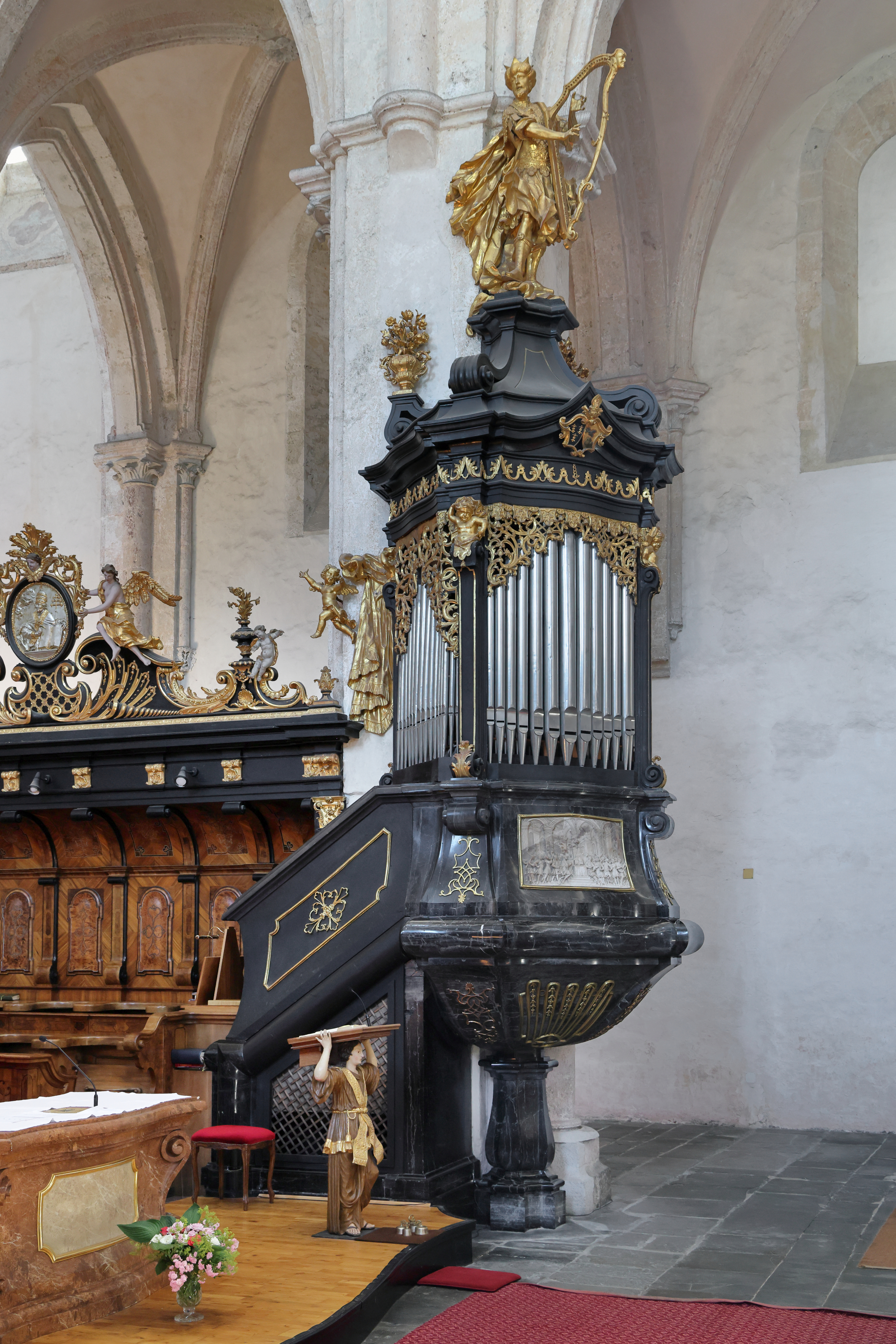
Choir pipe organ

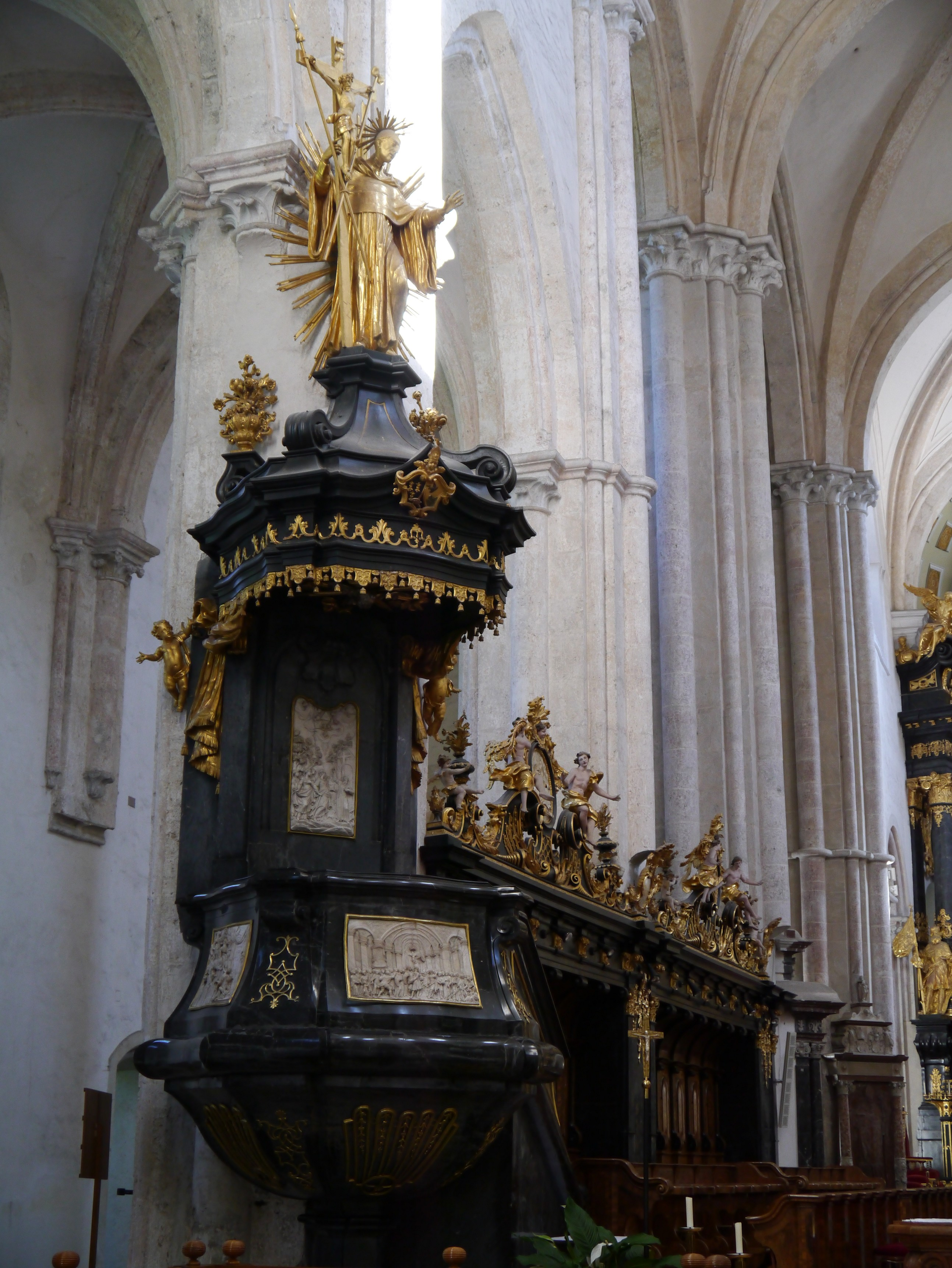
Abbey Church pulpit

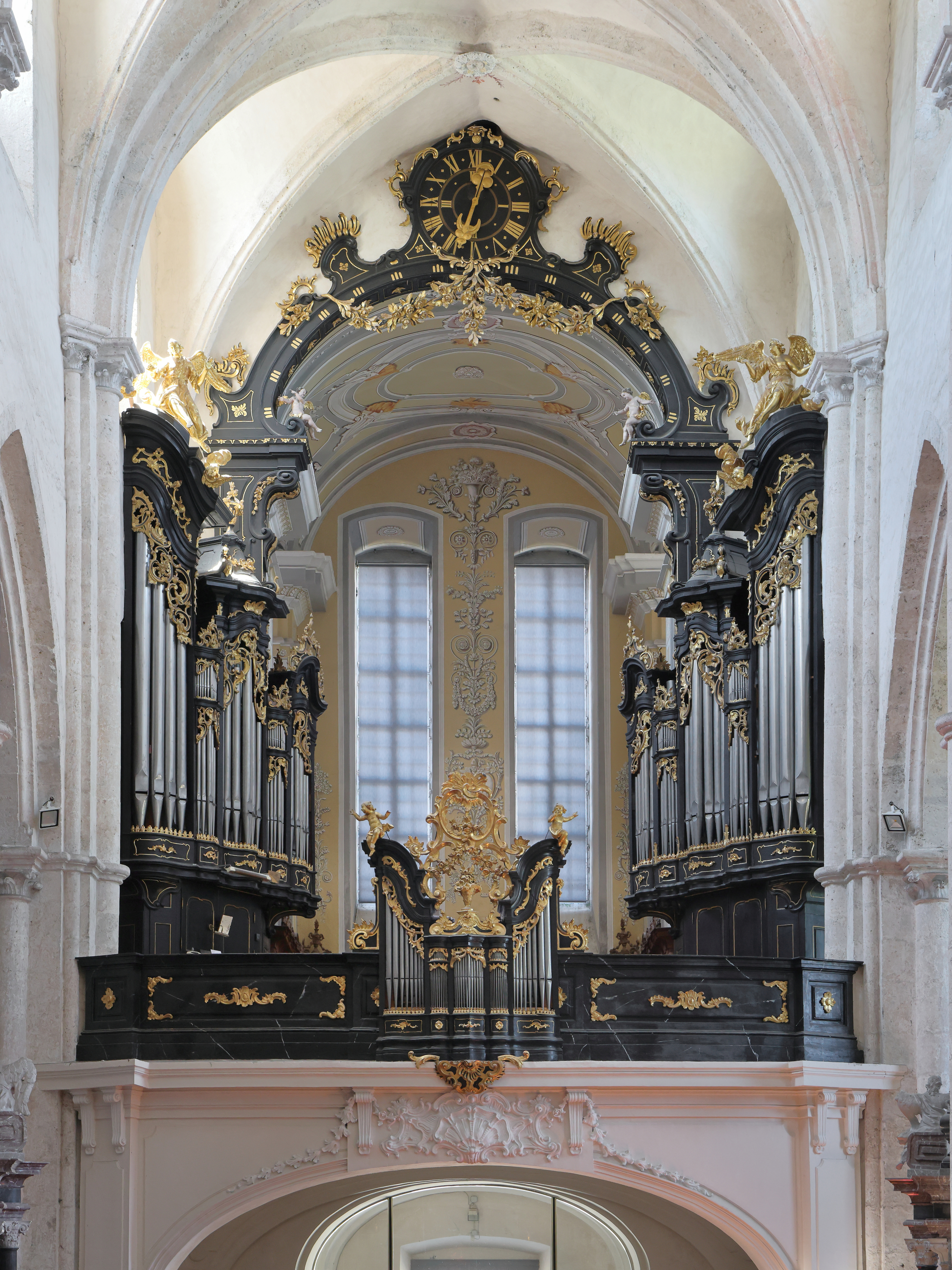
Abbey Church organ loft

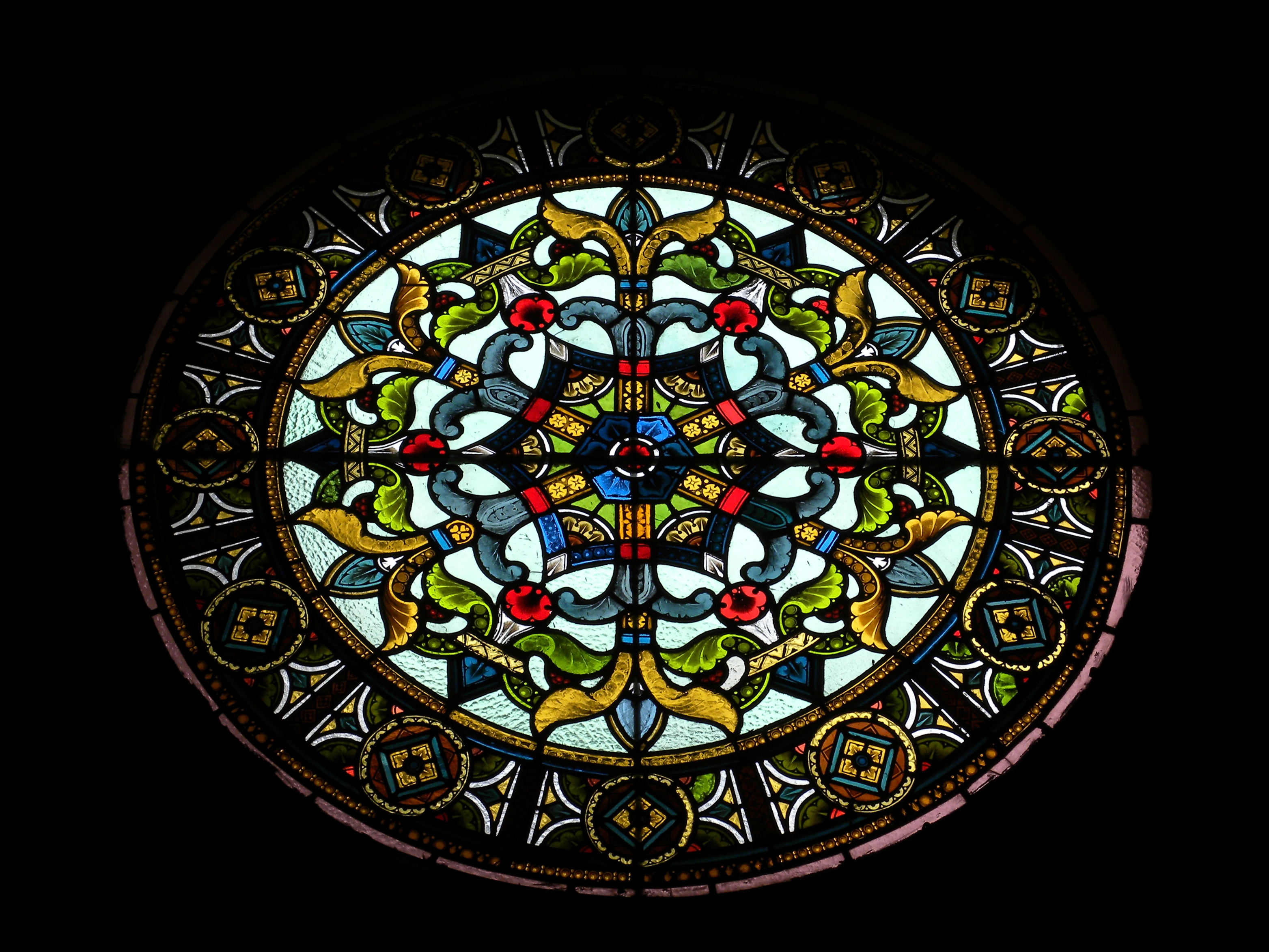
Abbey Church stained glass

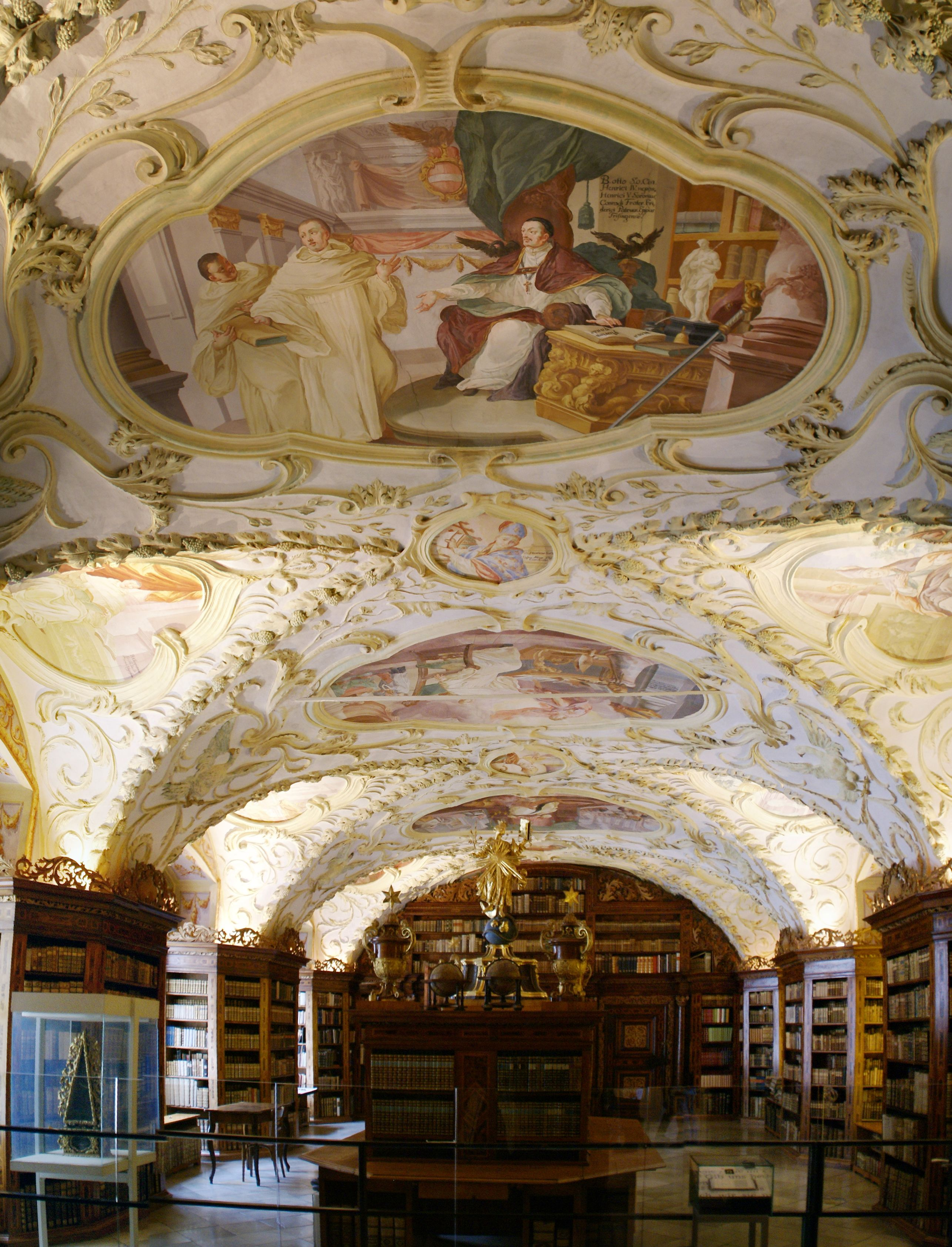
Library

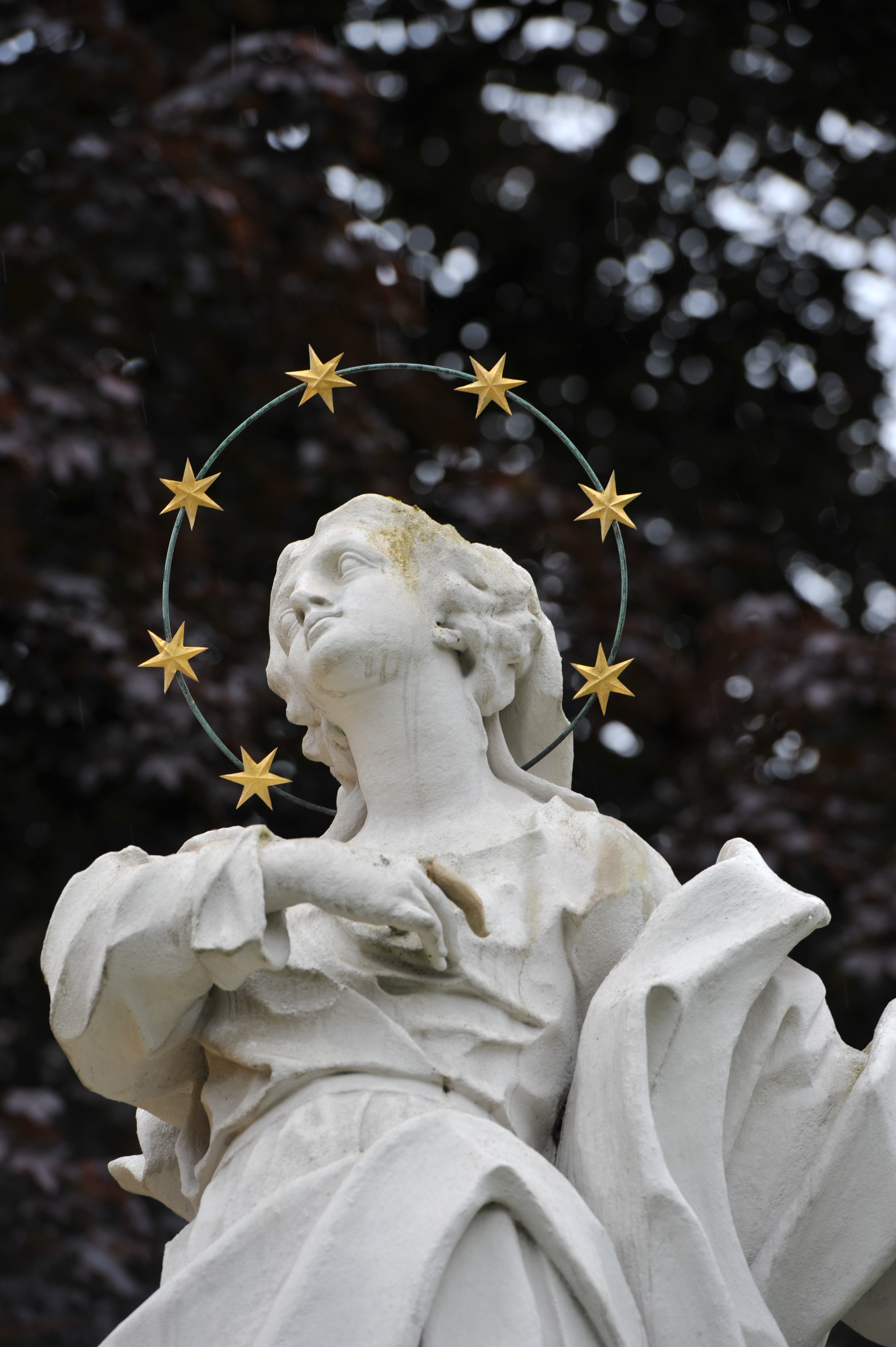
Immaculate Mary statue

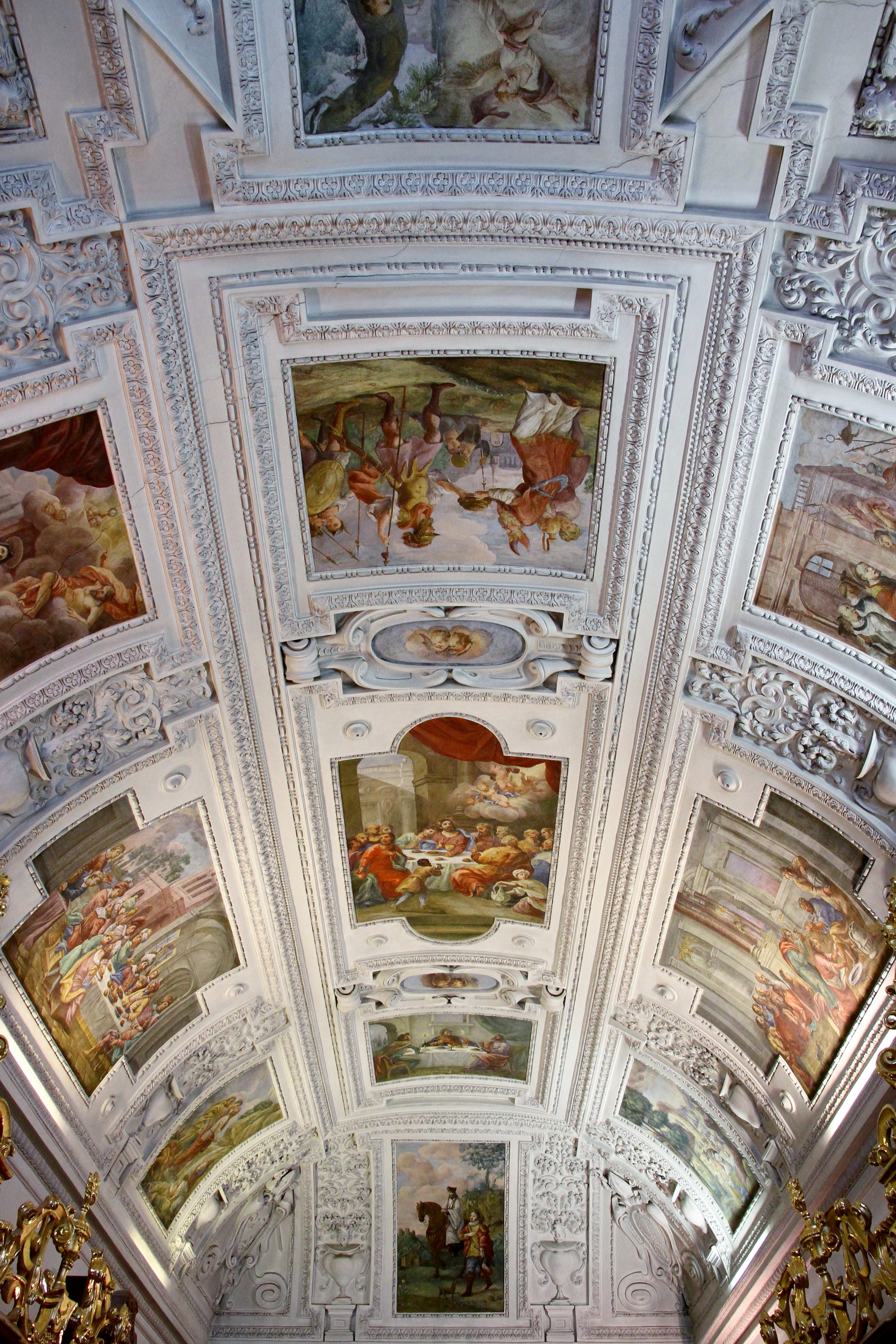
Sacristy ceiling
