= Château de Hohenbourg =

Ruined castle in Wingen, Bas-Rhin, France

Coordinates: 49°3′18″N 7°47′1″E

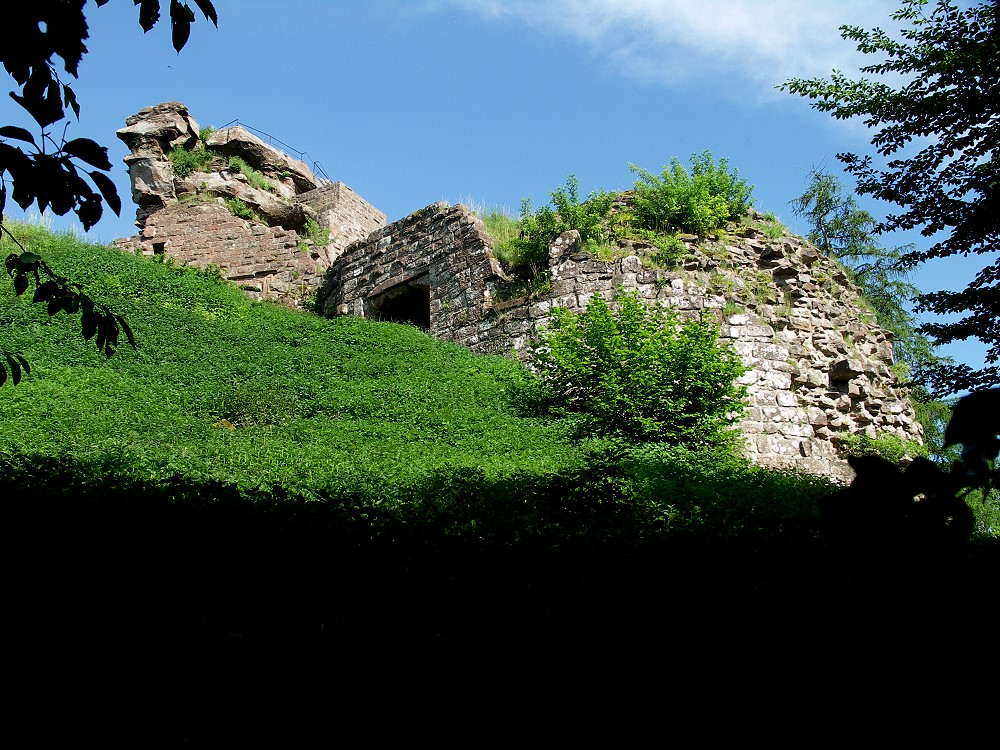
Ruins of Hohenbourg

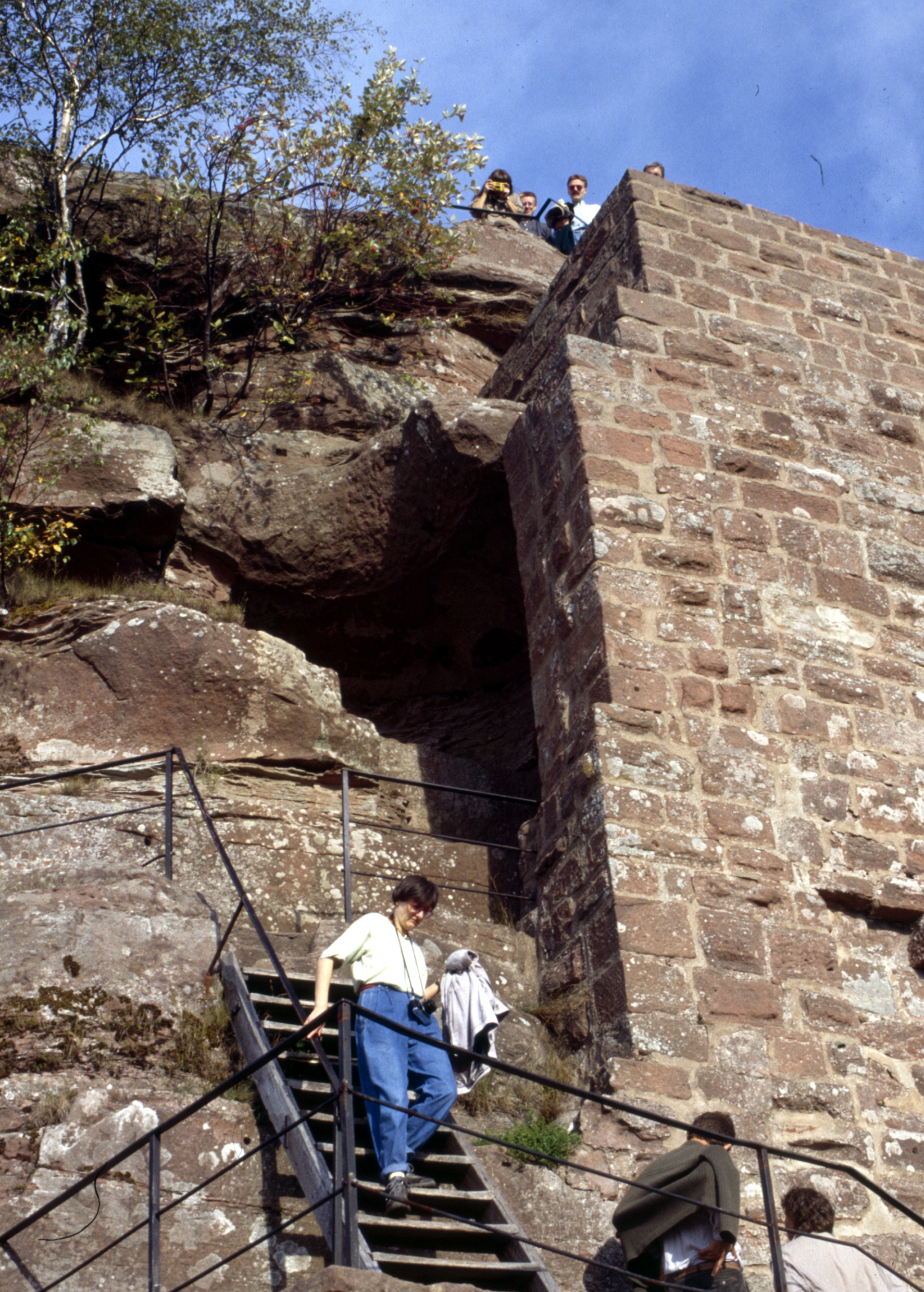
Stairway to Hohenbourg

The Château de Hohenbourg is a ruined castle in the commune of Wingen, in the Bas-Rhin département of France. It has been listed since 1898 as a monument historique by the French Ministry of Culture.

== History ==
The castle is partly built within the rock and dates to the mid-13th century. Its origins remain obscure; the first known occupants were the Pullers, known as the Hohenbourgs. Some of their seigneuries were common to the Fleckensteins, a cause of frequent rivalries. The castle was restored at the beginning of the 16th century.

In 1680, the castle was destroyed by the armies of Joseph de Montclar on the orders of Louis XIV.

== Structure ==
The artillery tower is a fine example of early 16th century military architecture. Also from this period is a beautiful Renaissance doorway.

From the terrace the panorama takes in the Northern Vosges and the Palatinate.

== Access ==
The castle can be reached from the village of Lembach along the road to Bitche and the frontier road, and finally a forest route as far as Gimbelhof. From there, a path has been constructed by the Vosges Club (Club Vosgien) marked by white lozenges in red circles.

== See also ==
- List of castles in France
