= Mürzzuschlag District =

Coordinates: 47.579°N 15.559°E

Mürzzuschlag District Bezirk Mürzzuschlag
- District
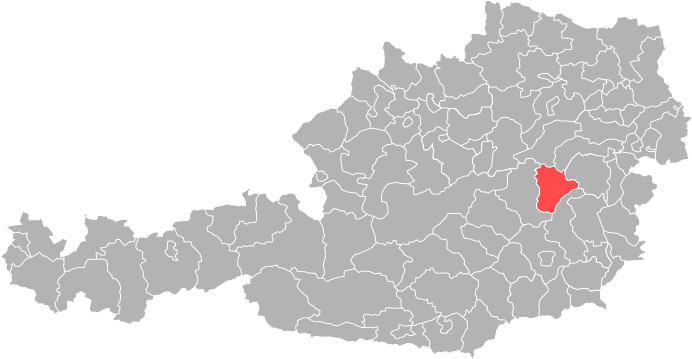
- Country: Austria
- State: Styria
- Number of municipalities: 16

Area
  - Total: 848.9 km^{2} (327.8 sq mi)

Population (2001)
  - Total: 42,943
  - Density: 50.59/km^{2} (131.0/sq mi)
- Time zone: UTC+1 (CET)
  - Summer (DST): UTC+2 (CEST)
- Telephone prefix: (0)3852

Bezirk Mürzzuschlag is a former district of the state of Styria in Austria. Mürzzuschlag merged with the district of Bruck an der Mur to form the new district Bruck-Mürzzuschlag on January 1, 2013.

== Municipalities ==
Suburbs, hamlets and other subdivisions of a municipality are indicated in small characters.

- Allerheiligen im Mürztal
  - Edelsdorf, Jasnitz, Leopersdorf, Sölsnitz, Wieden
- Altenberg an der Rax
  - Altenberg, Greith, Steinalpl
- Ganz
  - Auersbach, Eichhorntal, Lambach, Schöneben
- Kapellen
  - Raxen, Stojen
- Kindberg
- Krieglach
  - Alpl, Freßnitz, Freßnitzgraben, Krieglach-Schwöbing, Malleisten, Massing, Sommer
- Langenwang
  - Feistritzberg, Hönigsberg, Langenwang-Schwöbing, Lechen, Mitterberg, Pretul, Traibach
- Mitterdorf im Mürztal
  - Lutschaun
- Mürzhofen
- Mürzsteg
  - Dobrein, Dürrenthal, Frein an der Mürz, Kaltenbach, Lanau, Niederalpl, Scheiterboden, Tebrin
- Mürzzuschlag
  - Auersbach, Edlach, Hönigsberg, Kohleben, Lambach, Pernreit, Schöneben
- Neuberg an der Mürz
  - Alpl, Arzbach, Dorf, Krampen, Lechen, Neudörfl, Veitschbach
- Spital am Semmering
  - Steinhaus am Semmering
- Stanz im Mürztal
  - Brandstatt, Dickenbach, Fladenbach, Fochnitz, Hollersbach, Possegg, Retsch, Sonnberg, Traßnitz, Unteralm
- Veitsch
  - Großveitsch, Kleinveitsch, Niederaigen
- Wartberg im Mürztal
