= Bruck an der Mur District =

Coordinates: 47.500°N 15.289°E

Bruck an der Mur District Bezirk Bruck an der Mur
- District
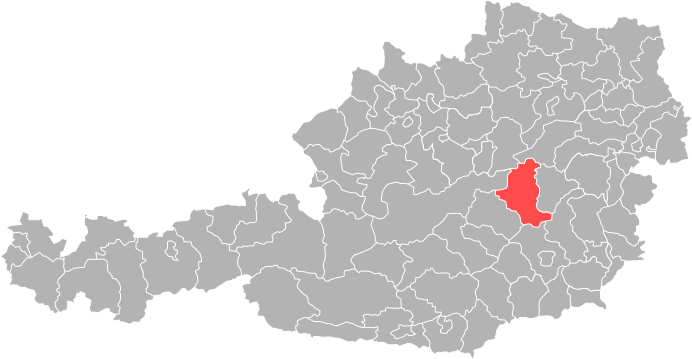
- Country: Austria
- State: Styria
- Number of municipalities: 21

Area
  - Total: 1,307.0 km^{2} (504.6 sq mi)

Population (2001)
  - Total: 64,991
  - Density: 49.725/km^{2} (128.79/sq mi)
- Time zone: UTC+1 (CET)
  - Summer (DST): UTC+2 (CEST)

Bezirk Bruck an der Mur is a former district of the state of Styria in Austria. Bruck an der Mur merged with the district of Mürzzuschlag to form the new district Bruck-Mürzzuschlag on January 1, 2013.

== Municipalities ==
- Aflenz Kurort
- Aflenz Land
  - Döllach, Dörflach, Graßnitz, Jauring, Tutschach
- Breitenau am Hochlantsch
  - Sankt Erhard, Sankt Jakob-Breitenau
- Bruck an der Mur
  - Berndorf, Kaltbach, Pischk, Pischkberg, Übelstein, Wiener Vorstadt
- Etmißl
  - Lonschitz, Oisching
- Frauenberg
  - Graschnitzgraben
- Gußwerk
  - Aschbach, Gollrad, Greith, Wegscheid, Weichselboden
- Halltal
  - Freingraben, Mooshuben, Rechengraben, Schöneben, Walstern
- Kapfenberg
  - Arndorf, Deuchendorf, Diemlach, Einöd, Emberg bei Bruck an der Mur, Emberg bei Kapfenberg, Floning, Hafendorf, Krottendorf, Pötschach, Sankt Martin, Schörgendorf, Stegg, Winkl
- Mariazell
  - Rasing
- Oberaich
  - Heuberg, Kotzgraben, Mötschlach, Oberdorf, Picheldorf, Sankt Dionysen, Urgental, Utschtal
- Parschlug
  - Göritz, Pogier
- Pernegg an der Mur
  - Gabraun, Kirchdorf, Mautstatt, Mixnitz, Pernegg, Roßgraben, Traföß, Zlatten
- Sankt Ilgen
- Sankt Katharein an der Laming
  - Hüttengraben, Oberdorf, Obertal, Rastal, Untertal
- Sankt Lorenzen im Mürztal
  - Alt-Hadersdorf, Fuscht, Gassing, Lesing, Mödersdorf, Mürzgraben, Nechelheim, Pogusch, Scheuchenegg
- Sankt Marein im Mürztal
  - Graschnitz, Schaldorf, Sonnleiten-Wieden
- Sankt Sebastian
  - Grünau, Thörl, Fölz, Hinterberg (Gemeinde Thörl), Palbersdorf
- Thörl
  - Fölz, Hinterberg, Palbersdorf
- Tragöß
  - Oberort, Pichl-Großdorf, Tal, Unterort
- Turnau
  - Au bei Turnau, Göriach, Seewiesen, Stübming, Thal
