= Sankt Lorenzen im Mürztal =

- Municipality
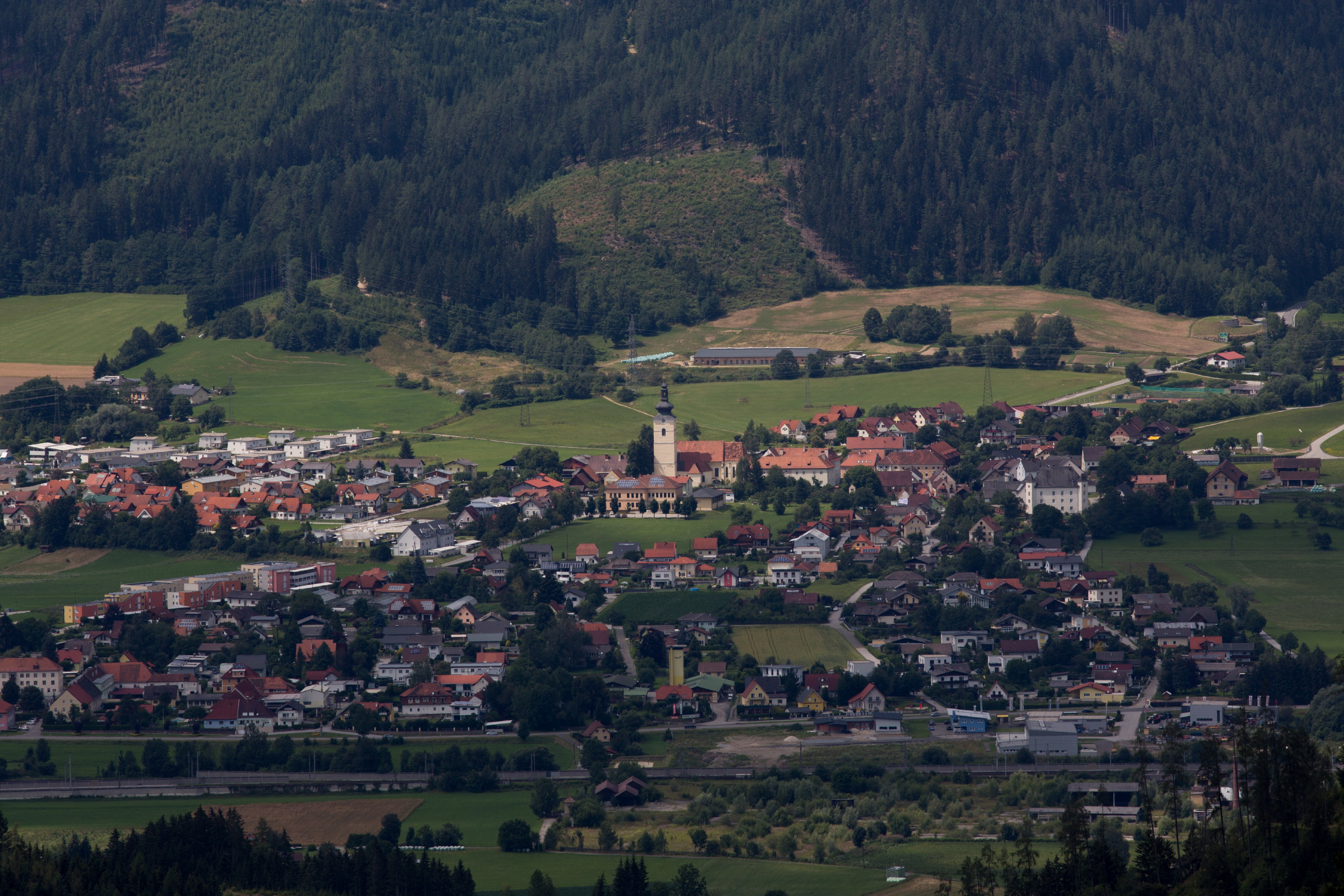

- Location within Austria
- Coordinates: 47°28′48″N 15°22′15″E
- Country: Austria
- State: Styria
- District: Bruck-Mürzzuschlag

Government
  - Mayor: Wilhelm Weberhofer (ÖVP)

Area
  - Total: 38.08 km^{2} (14.70 sq mi)
- Elevation: 500–1,366 m (1,640–4,482 ft)

Population (2018-01-01)
  - Total: 3,626
  - Density: 95.22/km^{2} (246.6/sq mi)
- Time zone: UTC+1 (CET)
  - Summer (DST): UTC+2 (CEST)
- Postal code: 8642
- Area code: 03864
- Vehicle registration: BM
- Website: stlorenzenimmuerztal. riskommunal.net/

Sankt Lorenzen im Mürztal is a municipality with 3674 inhabitants (as of January 1, 2021) in the judicial district of Bruck an der Mur and in the political district of Bruck-Mürzzuschlag in Styria, Austria.

== Geography ==
The centre of Sankt Lorenzen is at an altitude of 560 m above sea level. A., the highest point in the municipal area is the Töllmarkogel in the north at 1366 m above sea level.

Sankt Lorenzen im Mürztal is located northeast of the town of Kapfenberg. Other neighbouring communities are (clockwise) Parschlug, Turnau, Kindberg, Allerheiligen im Mürztal, Mürzhofen and Sankt Marein im Mürztal.

== Notable people ==
- Monique Fessl, DJ, musician and producer
