= Kapellen, Styria =

Kapellen
- Former municipality
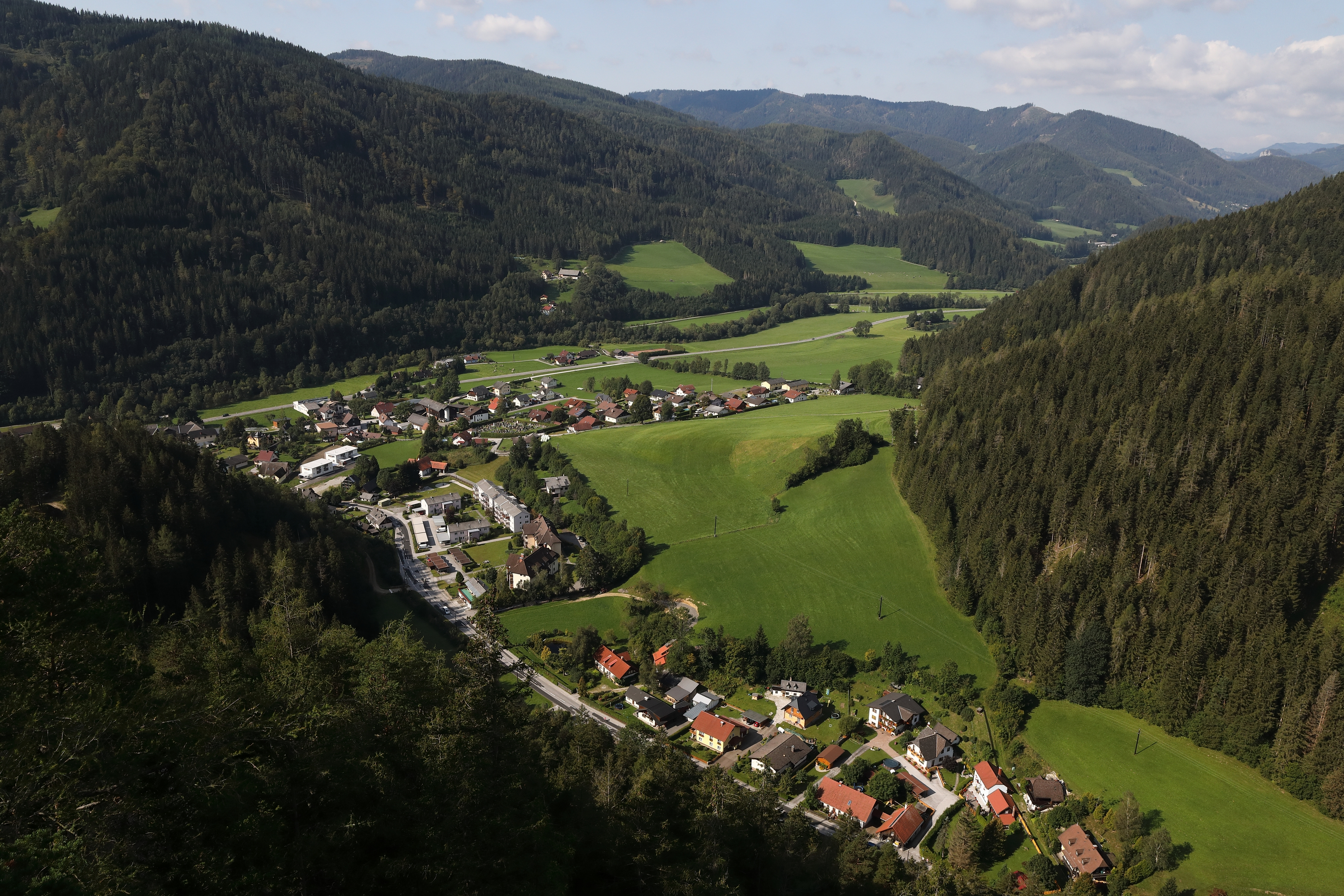
- Kapellen

- Location within Austria
- Coordinates: 47°38′50″N 15°37′47″E
- Country: Austria
- State: Styria
- District: Bruck-Mürzzuschlag

Area
  - Total: 44.59 km^{2} (17.22 sq mi)
- Elevation: 702 m (2,303 ft)

Population (1 January 2016)
  - Total: 643
  - Density: 14.4/km^{2} (37.3/sq mi)
- Time zone: UTC+1 (CET)
  - Summer (DST): UTC+2 (CEST)
- Postal code: 8691
- Area code: 03857
- Vehicle registration: MZ
- Website: www.kapellen-muerz.com

Kapellen is a former municipality in the district of Bruck-Mürzzuschlag in Styria, Austria. Since the 2015 Styria municipal structural reform, it is part of the municipality Neuberg an der Mürz.
