= Altenberg an der Rax =

- Former municipality
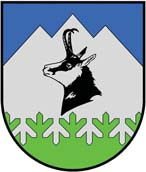
- Coat of arms

- Location within Austria
- Coordinates: 47°40′39″N 15°38′39″E
- Country: Austria
- State: Styria
- District: Bruck-Mürzzuschlag
- Elevation: 782 m (2,566 ft)

Population (1 January 2016)
  - Total: 324
- Time zone: UTC+1 (CET)
  - Summer (DST): UTC+2 (CEST)
- Postal code: 8691
- Area code: 03857
- Vehicle registration: MZ
- Website: www.altenberg-rax.com

Altenberg an der Rax was a municipality (before 2015) in the district of Bruck-Mürzzuschlag in Styria, Austria, part of Neuberg an der Mürz.

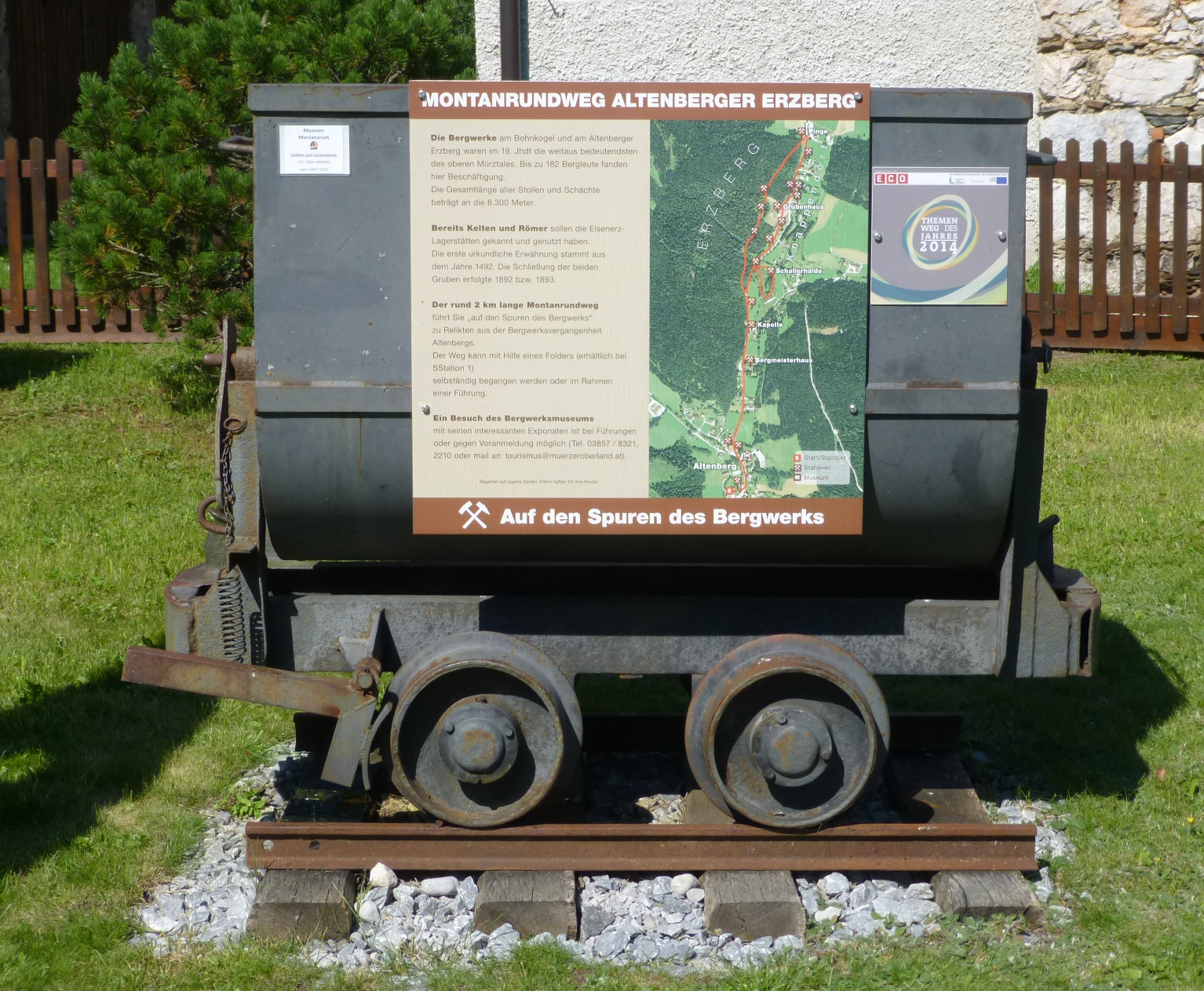
There are traces of the past mining activity.
