= Ganz, Styria =

Ganz
- Former municipality
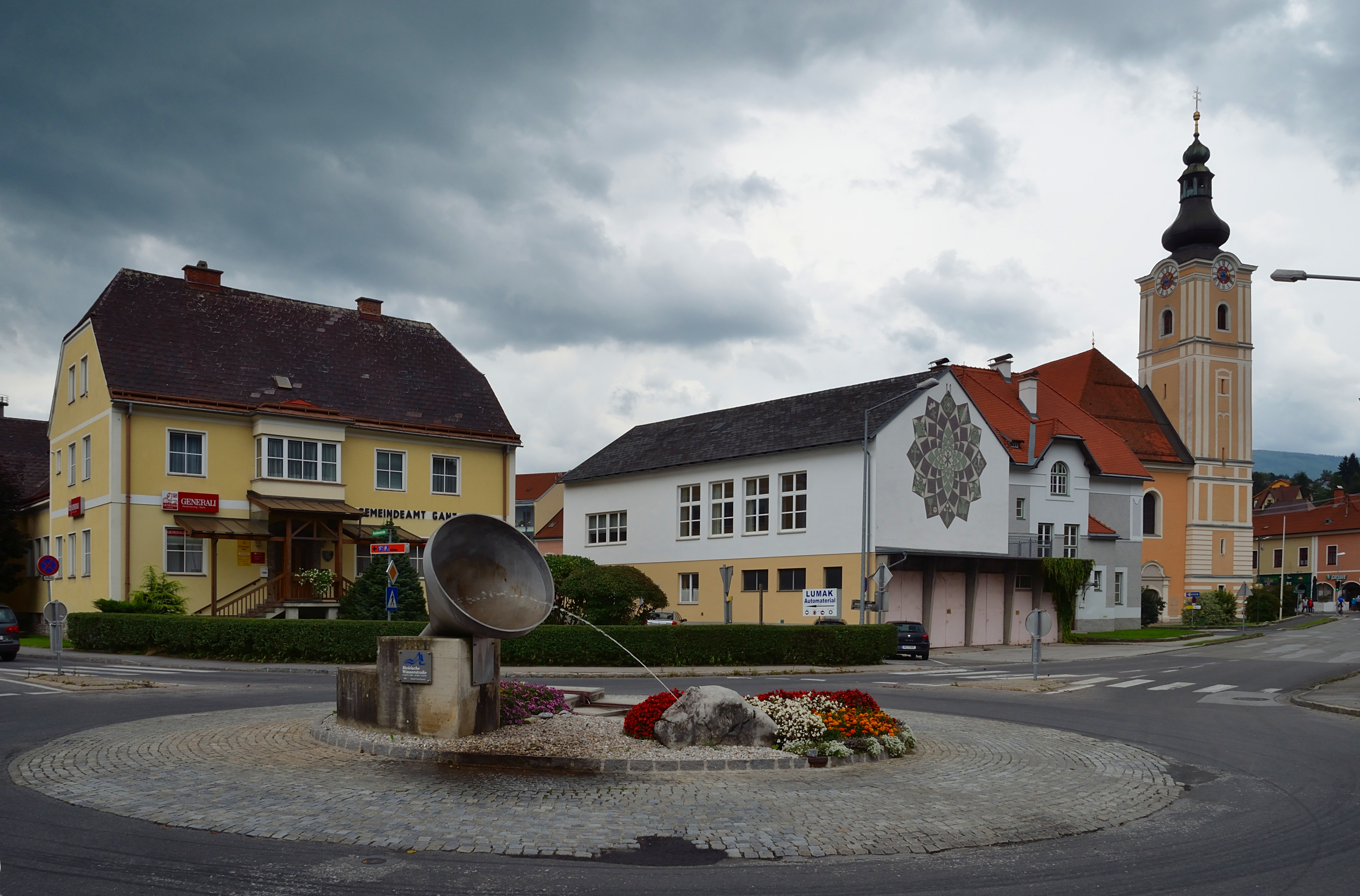
- Former municipal office of Ganz, the old church hall, rectory and parish church St. Cunigunde in 2014

- Location within Austria
- Coordinates: 47°34′54″N 15°40′41″E
- Country: Austria
- State: Styria
- District: Bruck-Mürzzuschlag
- Elevation: 820 m (2,690 ft)

Population (2014)
  - Total: 346
- Time zone: UTC+1 (CET)
  - Summer (DST): UTC+2 (CEST)
- Postal code: 8680
- Area code: 03852
- Vehicle registration: MZ

Ganz was a municipality in Austria which merged in January 2015 with Mürzzuschlag in the district of Bruck-Mürzzuschlag in Styria, Austria.
