= Frauenberg, Styria =

Frauenberg
- Former municipality
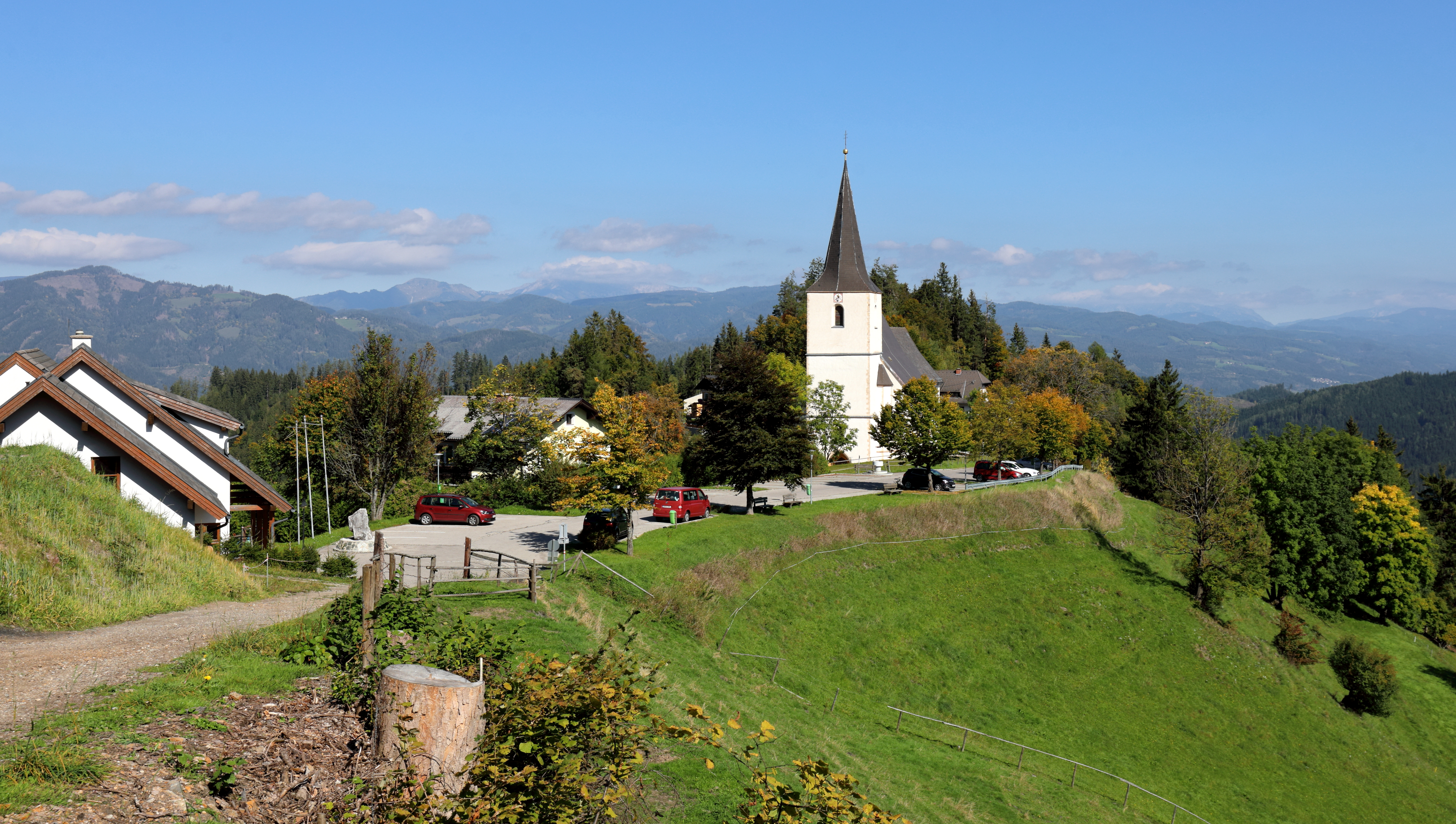

- Coat of arms

- Location within Austria
- Coordinates: 47°26′00″N 15°21′00″E
- Country: Austria
- State: Styria
- District: Bruck-Mürzzuschlag

Area
  - Total: 20.62 km^{2} (7.96 sq mi)
- Elevation: 941 m (3,087 ft)

Population (1 January 2016)
  - Total: 147
  - Density: 7.13/km^{2} (18.5/sq mi)
- Time zone: UTC+1 (CET)
  - Summer (DST): UTC+2 (CEST)
- Postal code: 8600
- Area code: 03862
- Vehicle registration: BM
- Website: www.frauenberg.at

Frauenberg is a former municipality in the district of Bruck-Mürzzuschlag in Styria, Austria. Since the 2015 Styria municipal structural reform, it is part of the municipality Sankt Marein im Mürztal.

== History ==
In 1354 a chapel was built on a site then occupied by a statue of the Virgin Mary. The chapel was replaced in 1489 by a church in the late Gothic style, and this in turn was replaced by a Baroque church in 1769. Here, in 1775, the famous organ builder Anton Römer installed an organ.
