= Turnau =

Turnau may refer to:

- Turnau, German name for the Czech city of Turnov
- Turnau, Styria, market town in Austria

== People ==
- Grzegorz Turnau (born 1967), Polish composer, poet and singer

== See also ==
- Thurnau
