= Spital am Semmering =

- Municipality
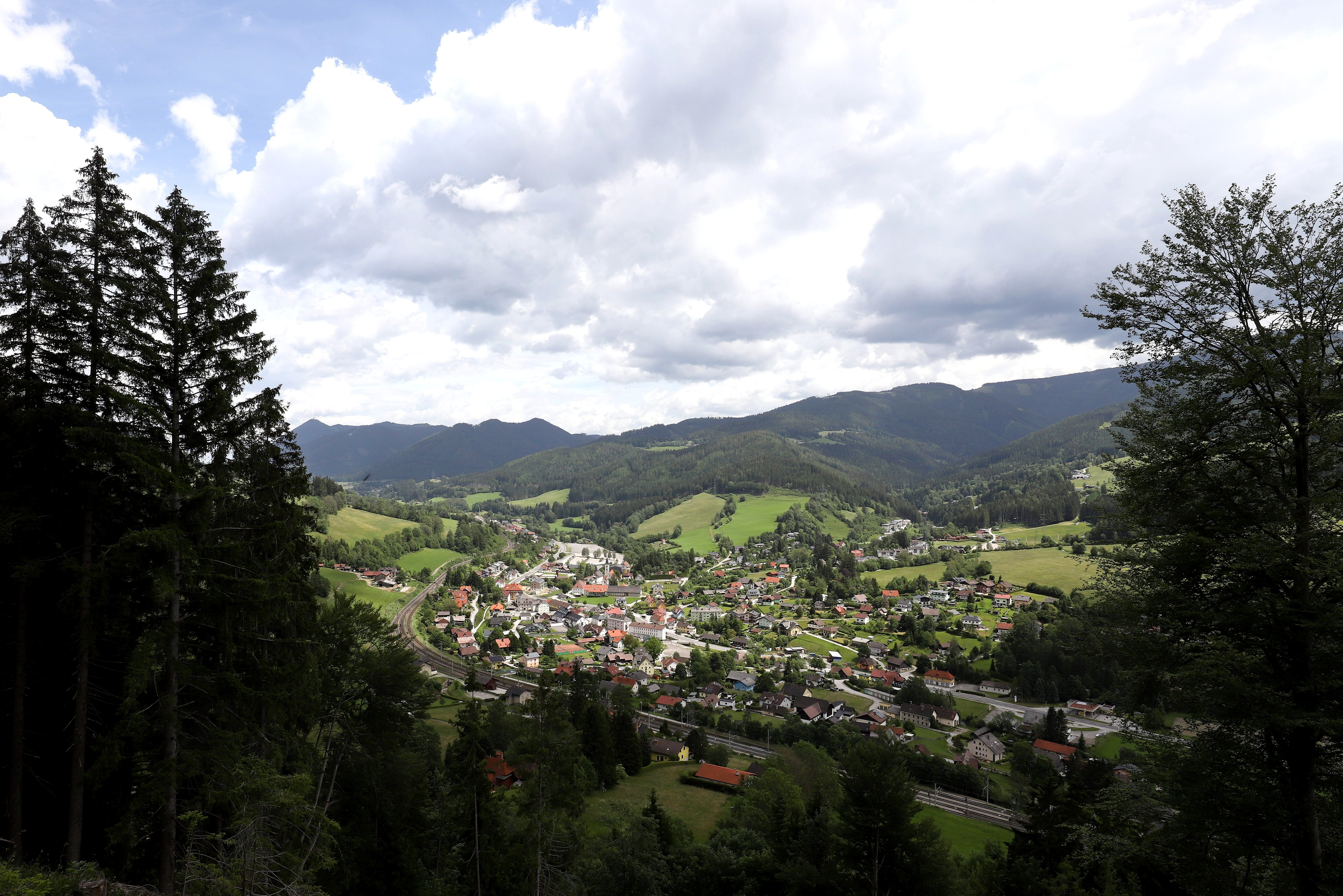
- Spital am Semmering

- Coat of arms

- Location within Austria
- Coordinates: 47°36′58″N 15°45′14″E
- Country: Austria
- State: Styria
- District: Bruck-Mürzzuschlag

Government
  - Mayor: Reinhard Reisinger (SPÖ)

Area
  - Total: 72.73 km^{2} (28.08 sq mi)
- Elevation: 800 m (2,600 ft)

Population (2018-01-01)
  - Total: 1,595
  - Density: 21.93/km^{2} (56.80/sq mi)
- Time zone: UTC+1 (CET)
  - Summer (DST): UTC+2 (CEST)
- Postal code: 8684
- Area code: 03853
- Vehicle registration: MZ
- Website: www.spitalamsemmering.com

Spital am Semmering, in the Semmering Pass, is a municipality in the district of Bruck-Mürzzuschlag in Styria, Austria. It is home to the Stuhleck ski hill. Spital was largely endowed in 1160 by seven of the Margrave of Styria's ministeriales. The endowment included income from wide estates, vineyards and a town.
