= Allerheiligen im Mürztal =

- Former municipality
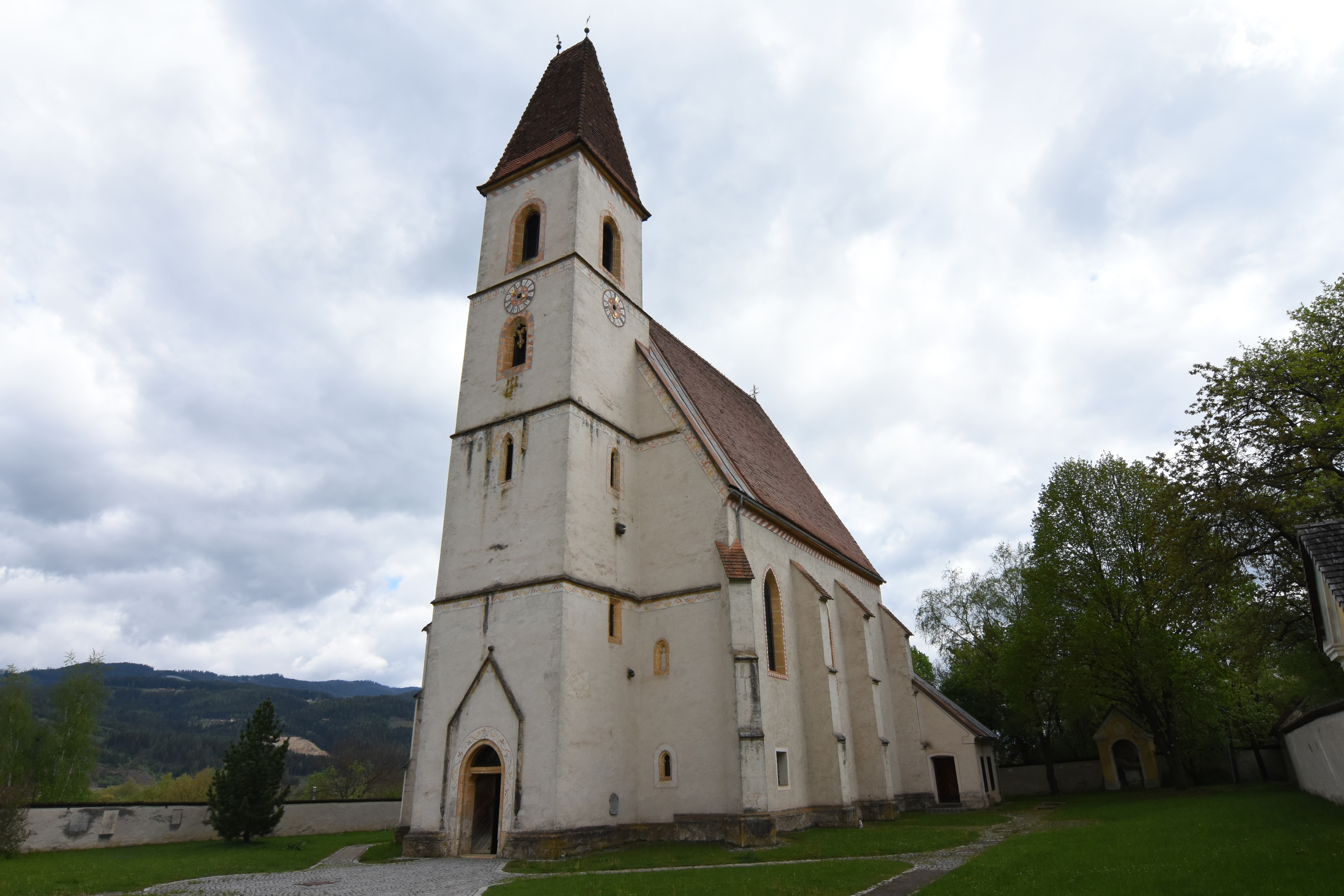
- Allerheiligen im Mürztal parish church

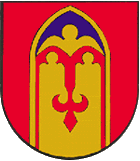
- Coat of arms

- Location within Austria
- Coordinates: 47°28′53″N 15°24′20″E
- Country: Austria
- State: Styria
- District: Bruck-Mürzzuschlag
- Elevation: 551 m (1,808 ft)

Population
  - Total: 1,953
- Time zone: UTC+1 (CET)
  - Summer (DST): UTC+2 (CEST)
- Postal code: 8643
- Area code: +43 3864
- Vehicle registration: MZ
- Website: www.allerheiligen-im-muerztal.at

Allerheiligen im Mürztal was a municipality in Austria which merged in January 2015 into Kindberg in the Bruck-Mürzzuschlag District of Styria, Austria. It is not to be confused with the municipality of Allerheiligen bei Wildon in Southern Styria.

== Geography ==
Allerheiligen was located about 14 kilometres (8.7 mi) northeast of Bruck an der Mur and about 30 km (19 mi) southwest of Mürzzuschlag.
