= Kindberg =

- Municipality
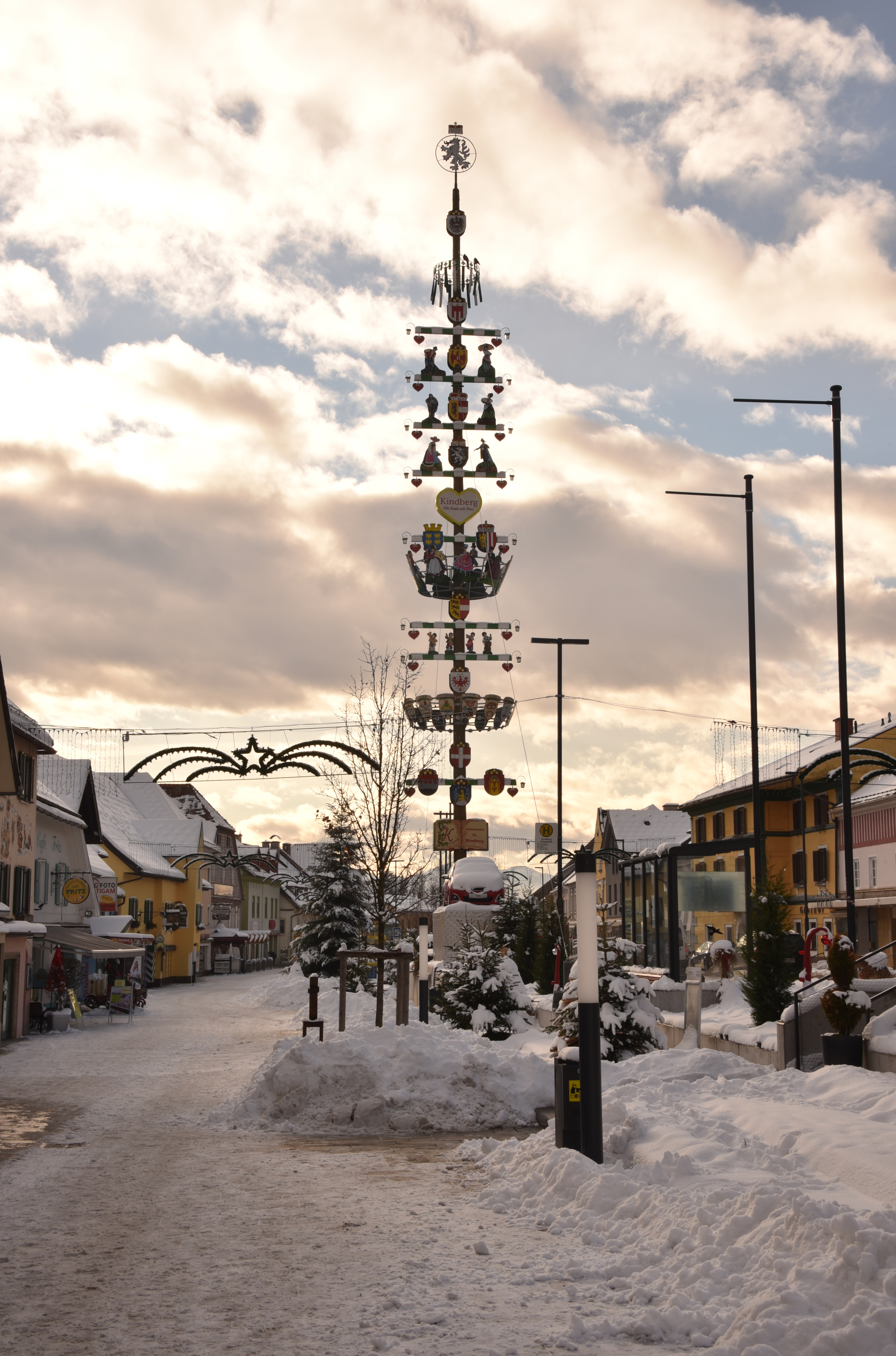
- Main square in Kindberg

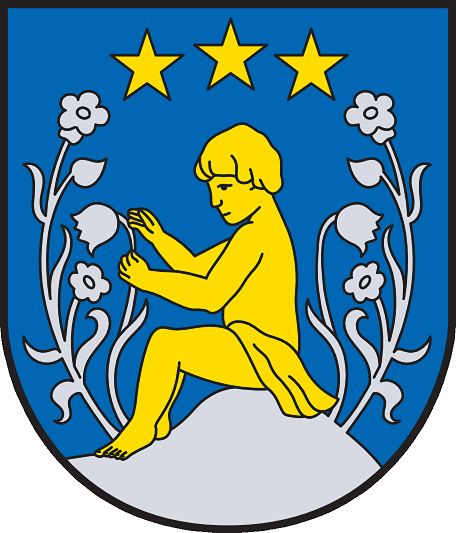
- Coat of arms

- Location within Austria
- Coordinates: 47°30′16″N 15°26′56″E
- Country: Austria
- State: Styria
- District: Bruck-Mürzzuschlag

Government
  - Mayor: Christian Sander (SPÖ)

Area
  - Total: 90.66 km^{2} (35.00 sq mi)
- Elevation: 565 m (1,854 ft)

Population (2018-01-01)
  - Total: 8,047
  - Density: 88.76/km^{2} (229.9/sq mi)
- Time zone: UTC+1 (CET)
  - Summer (DST): UTC+2 (CEST)
- Postal code: 8650, 8652
- Area code: +43 3865
- Vehicle registration: BM
- Website: www.kindberg.at

Kindberg is a municipality with a population in 2023 of 8,183 in the district of Bruck-Mürzzuschlag in Styria, Austria. Kindberg's landmark is the Kindberger Zunftbaum, an approximately 30-metre high wooden pole on the main square.

== Geography ==
Kindberg lies in the valley of the Mürz about 17 km northeast of Bruck an der Mur and about 20 km southwest of Mürzzuschlag.

== History ==
In the 8th century, the first Bavarian settlers settled in the Mürztal. More intensive settlement and clearing took place in the 12th century. On 8 May 1267 one of the worst earthquakes in Austria's history occurred near Kindberg.

Between 1779 and 1786 one of the most terrible series of murders in Austria took place: A 30-year-old servant ("the Herzlfresser") killed six women and ate the heart of two of them.

Kindberg is well known for its flower decorations. In the European competition "Entente Florale Europe" Kindberg was awarded a gold medal in 2003 and a silver medal in 1997 in the category "city".

In 2020, a fragment of a meteorite weighing 233 grams was found in Kindberg - the first discovery of an Austrian meteorite in 44 years.

== Population ==
Historical population
Year	Pop.	±%
1869	2,698	—
1880	3,181	+17.9%
1890	3,407	+7.1%
1900	4,367	+28.2%
1910	4,892	+12.0%
1923	4,629	−5.4%
1934	4,688	+1.3%
1939	4,730	+0.9%
1951	5,473	+15.7%
1961	5,766	+5.4%
1971	6,143	+6.5%
1981	6,261	+1.9%
1991	6,078	−2.9%
2001	5,865	−3.5%
2011	5,546	−5.4%
2023	8,183	+47.5%

As part of the municipal structural reform in Styria, Kindberg was merged with the municipalities of Allerheiligen im Mürztal and Mürzhofen in 2015. This explains the high increase in population from 2011 to 2023.
