= Bruck-Mürzzuschlag District =

Coordinates: 47.4167°N 15.2667°E

Bruck-Mürzzuschlag District Bezirk Bruck-Mürzzuschlag
- District
- Country: Austria
- Federal state: Styria
- Number of municipalities: 19
- Administrative seat: Bruck an der Mur

Government
  - District Governor: Bernhard Preiner

Area
  - Total: 2,155 km^{2} (832 sq mi)

Population (1 January 2016)
  - Total: 100,306
  - Density: 46.55/km^{2} (120.6/sq mi)
- Time zone: UTC+01:00 (CET)
  - Summer (DST): UTC+02:00 (CEST)
- Vehicle registration: BM
- NUTS code: AT223

Bruck-Mürzzuschlag (German: [bʁʊk myɐ̯t͡sˈt͡suːʃlak]) is a district in Styria, Austria. It came into effect on January 1, 2013, when the merging of the districts Bruck an der Mur and Mürzzuschlag occurred. Just 2 years later, on 1 January 2015, the district was restructured in the Styria municipal structural reform and reduced from 37 to 19 towns. It consists of the following 19 municipalities:

- Aflenz
- Breitenau am Hochlantsch
- Bruck an der Mur
- Kapfenberg
- Kindberg
- Krieglach
- Langenwang
- Mariazell
- Mürzzuschlag
- Neuberg an der Mürz
- Pernegg an der Mur
- Sankt Barbara im Mürztal
- Sankt Lorenzen im Mürztal
- Sankt Marein im Mürztal
- Spital am Semmering
- Stanz im Mürztal
- Thörl
- Tragöß-Sankt Katharein
- Turnau

== Prior district before 2015 ==
Up until 1 January 2015, the district contained the following 37 municipalities:

- Aflenz Kurort
- Aflenz Land
- Allerheiligen im Mürztal
- Altenberg an der Rax
- Breitenau am Hochlantsch
- Bruck an der Mur
- Etmißl
- Frauenberg
- Ganz
- Gußwerk
- Halltal
- Kapellen
- Kapfenberg
- Kindberg
- Krieglach
- Langenwang
- Mariazell
- Mitterdorf im Mürztal
- Mürzhofen
- Mürzsteg
- Mürzzuschlag
- Neuberg an der Mürz
- Oberaich
- Parschlug
- Pernegg an der Mur
- Sankt Ilgen
- Sankt Katharein an der Laming
- Sankt Lorenzen im Mürztal
- Sankt Marein im Mürztal
- Sankt Sebastian
- Spital am Semmering
- Stanz im Mürztal
- Thörl
- Tragöß
- Turnau
- Veitsch
- Wartberg im Mürztal
