= Stanz im Mürztal =

- Municipality
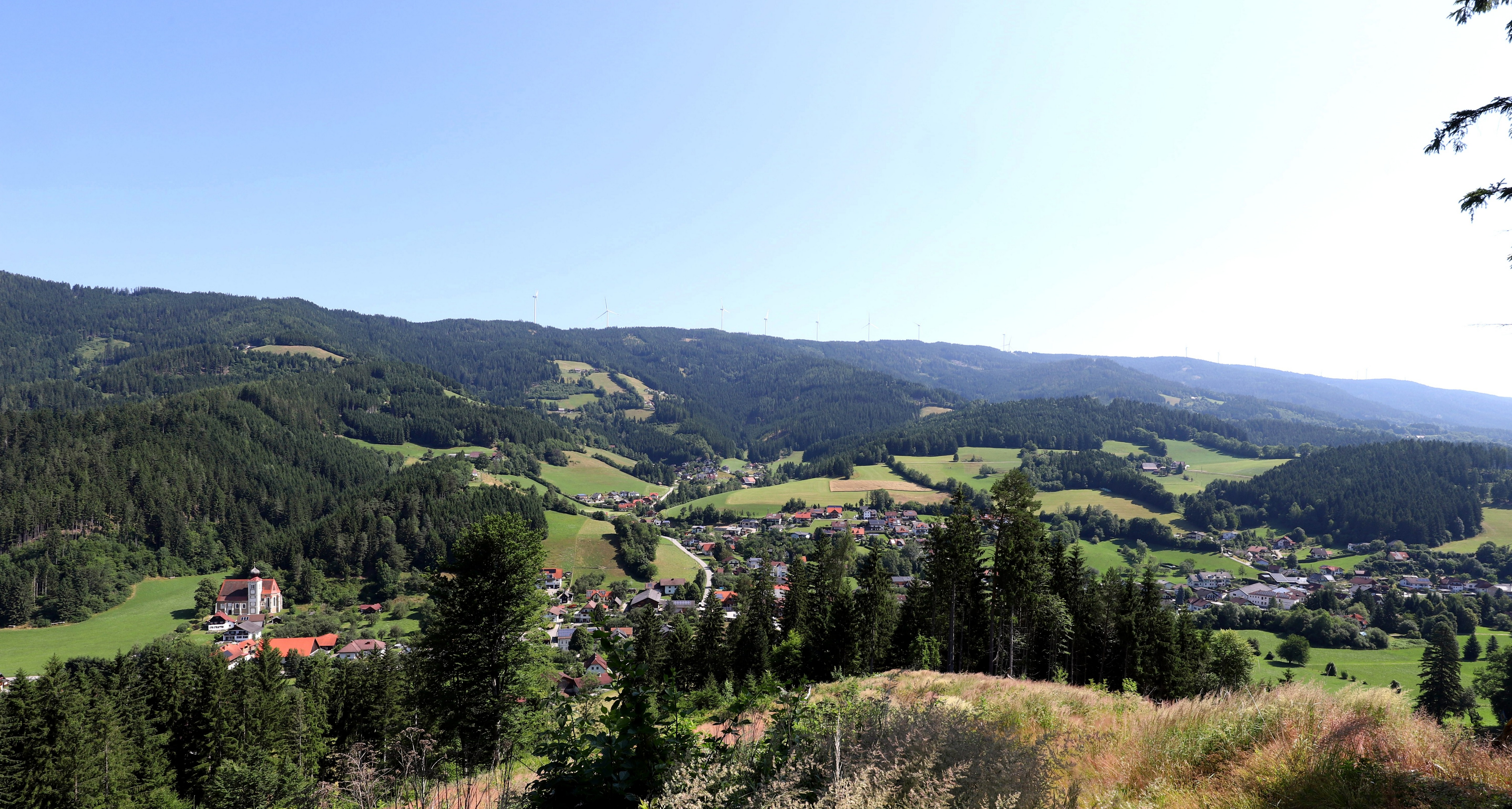
- Stanz im Mürztal

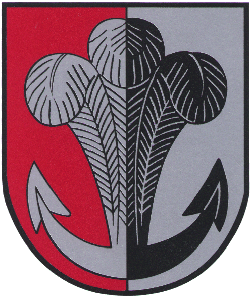
- Coat of arms

- Location within Austria
- Coordinates: 47°27′59″N 15°30′01″E
- Country: Austria
- State: Styria
- District: Bruck-Mürzzuschlag

Government
  - Mayor: Friedrich Pichler (BI)

Area
  - Total: 76.95 km^{2} (29.71 sq mi)
- Elevation: 669 m (2,195 ft)

Population (2018-01-01)
  - Total: 1,827
  - Density: 23.74/km^{2} (61.49/sq mi)
- Time zone: UTC+1 (CET)
  - Summer (DST): UTC+2 (CEST)
- Postal code: 8653
- Area code: +43 3865
- Vehicle registration: BM
- Website: www.stanz.at

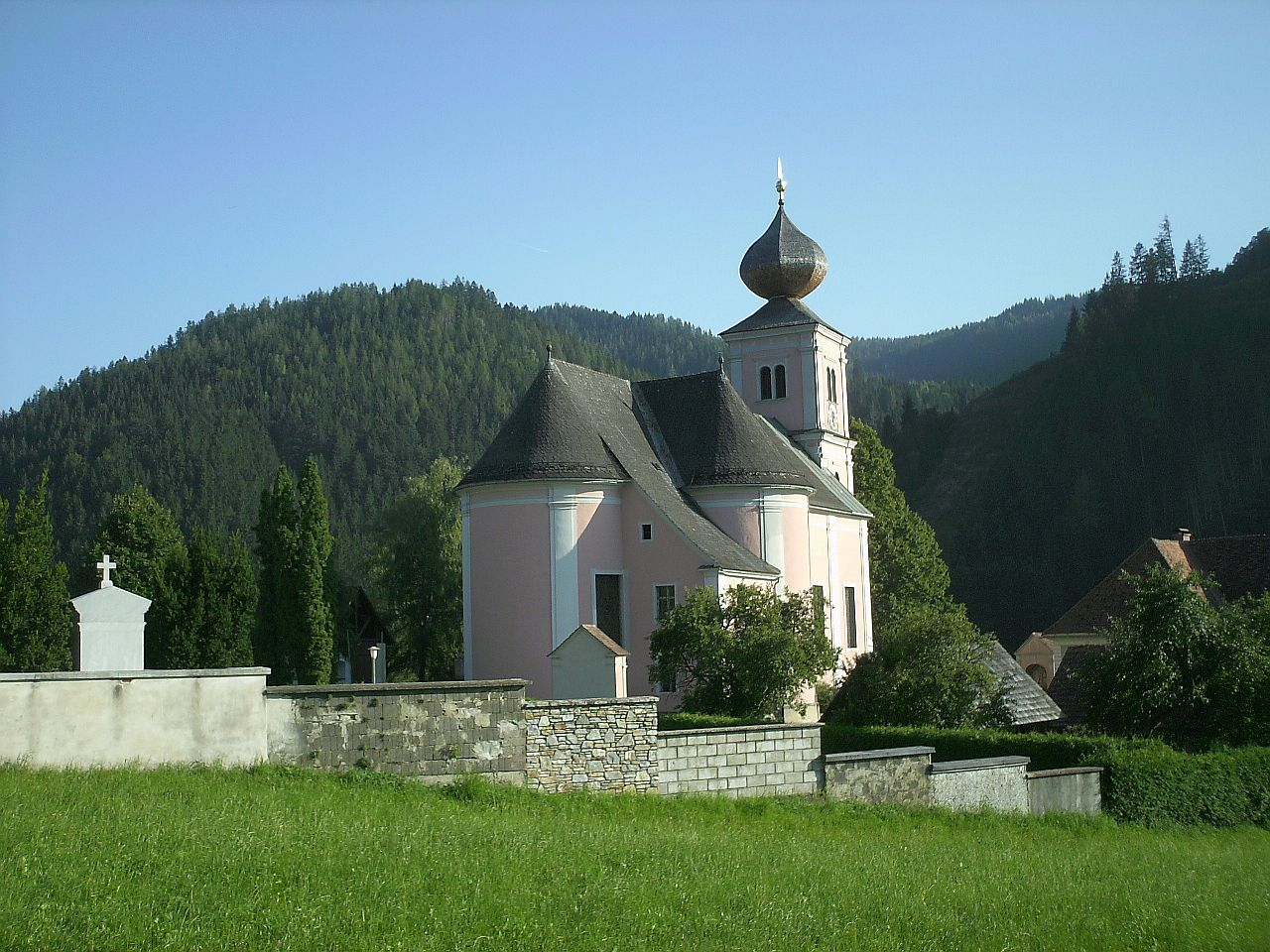
Stanz im Mürztal parish church

Stanz im Mürztal is a municipality in the district of Bruck-Mürzzuschlag in Styria, Austria.
