= Gußwerk =

- Former municipality
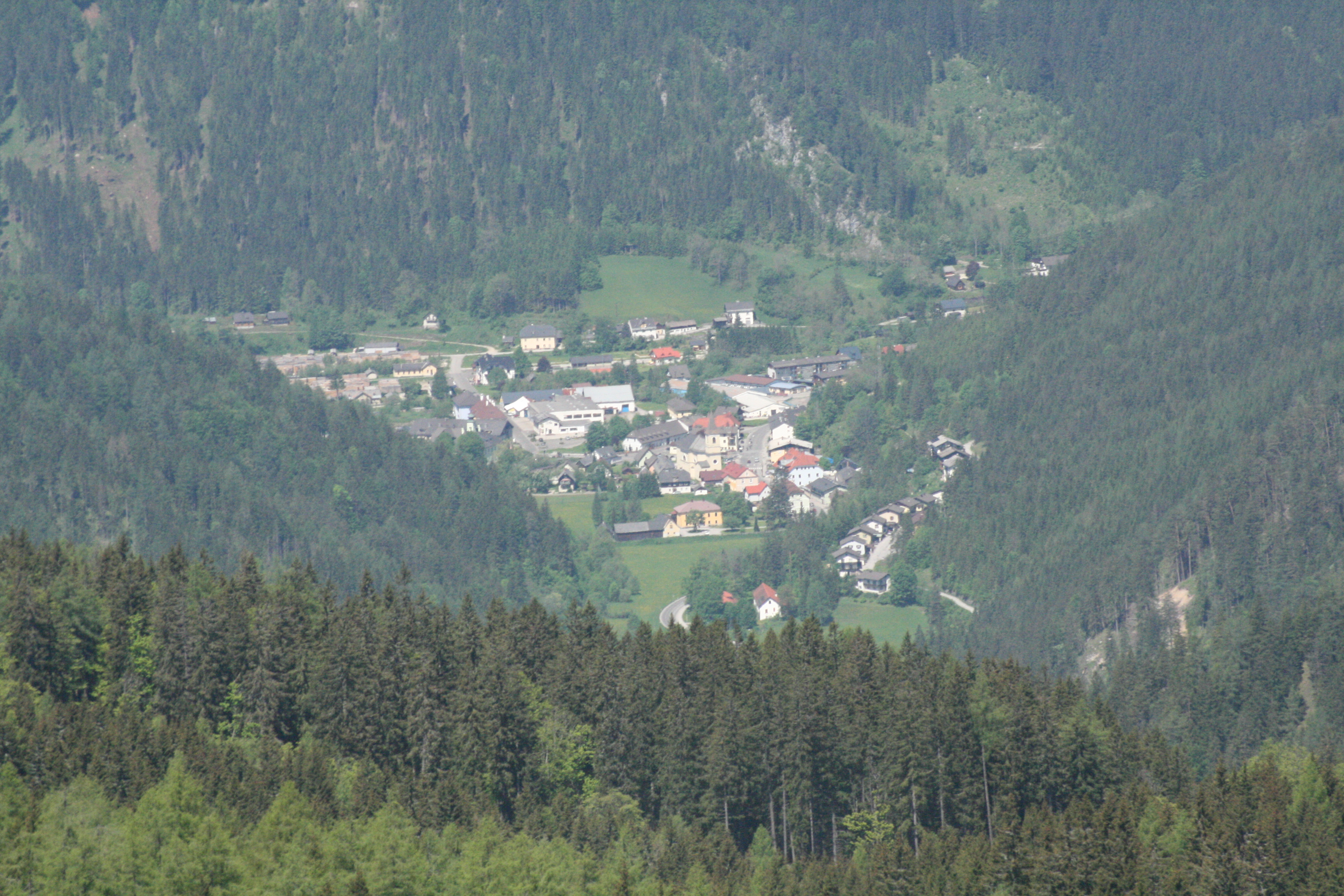
- Remote view of Gußwerk

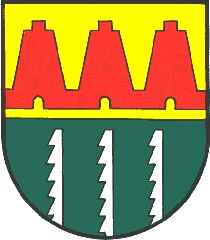
- Coat of arms

- Location within Austria
- Coordinates: 47°44′24″N 15°18′13″E
- Country: Austria
- State: Styria
- District: Bruck-Mürzzuschlag

Area
  - Total: 285.36 km^{2} (110.18 sq mi)
- Elevation: 747 m (2,451 ft)

Population (1 January 2016)
  - Total: 1,227
  - Density: 4.300/km^{2} (11.14/sq mi)
- Time zone: UTC+1 (CET)
  - Summer (DST): UTC+2 (CEST)
- Postal code: 8632
- Area code: 03882
- Vehicle registration: BM
- Website: www.gusswerk.at

Gußwerk is a former municipality in the district of Bruck-Mürzzuschlag in Styria, Austria. Since the 2015 Styria municipal structural reform, it is part of the municipality Mariazell.
