= Oberaich =

- Former municipality
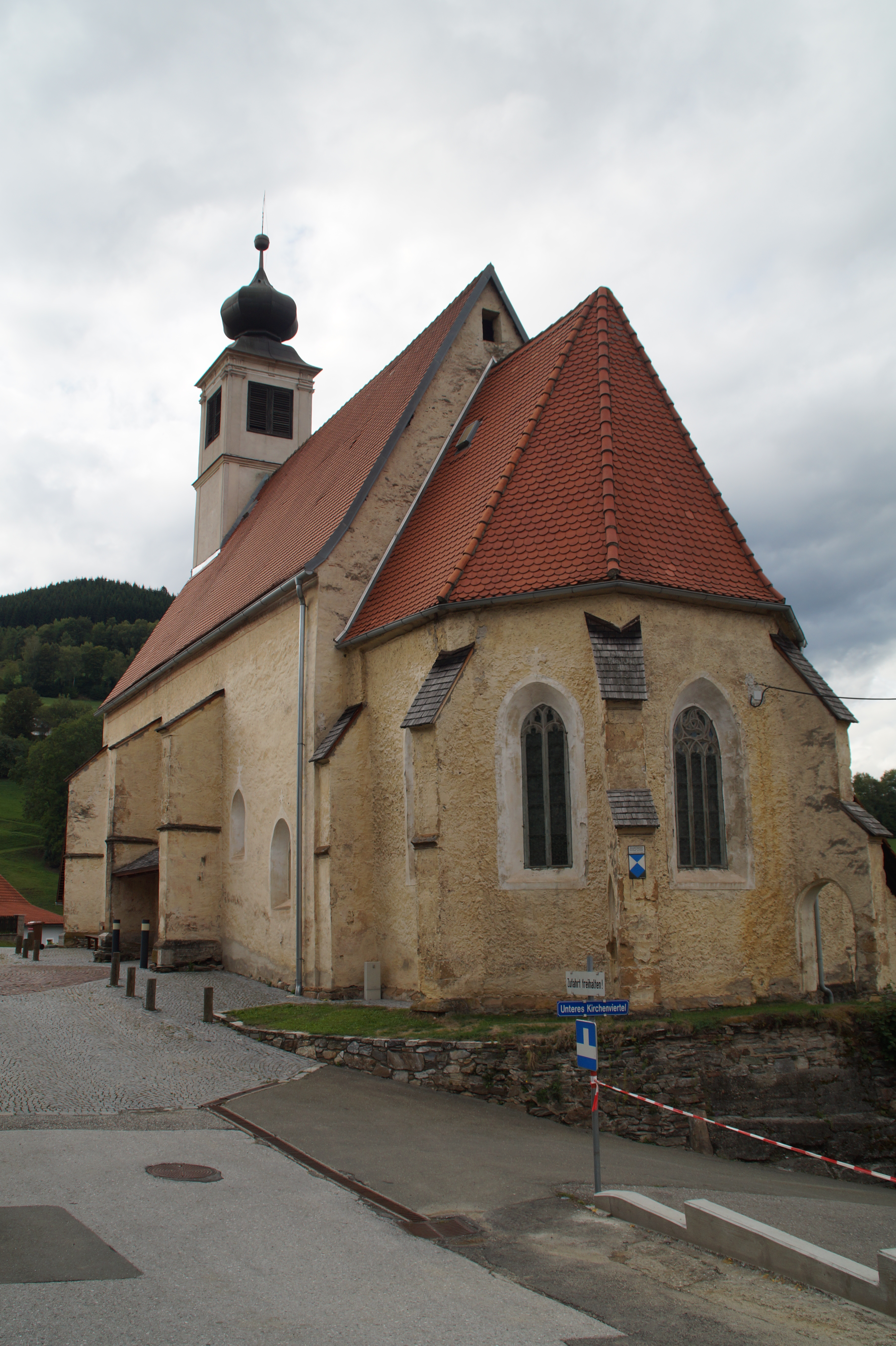
- Saint Ulrich church in Oberaich

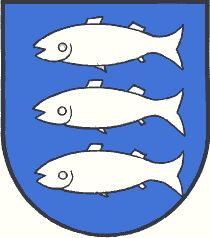
- Coat of arms

- Location within Austria
- Coordinates: 47°24′00″N 15°13′00″E
- Country: Austria
- State: Styria
- District: Bruck-Mürzzuschlag

Area
  - Total: 47 km^{2} (18 sq mi)
- Elevation: 500–1,664 m (1,640–5,459 ft)

Population (1 January 2016)
  - Total: 3,189
  - Density: 68/km^{2} (180/sq mi)
- Time zone: UTC+1 (CET)
  - Summer (DST): UTC+2 (CEST)
- Postal code: 8600
- Area code: 03862
- Vehicle registration: BM
- Website: www.oberaich.at

Oberaich is a former municipality in the district of Bruck-Mürzzuschlag in Styria, Austria. Since the 2015 Styria municipal structural reform, it is part of the municipality Bruck an der Mur.
