= Breitenau am Hochlantsch =

- Municipality
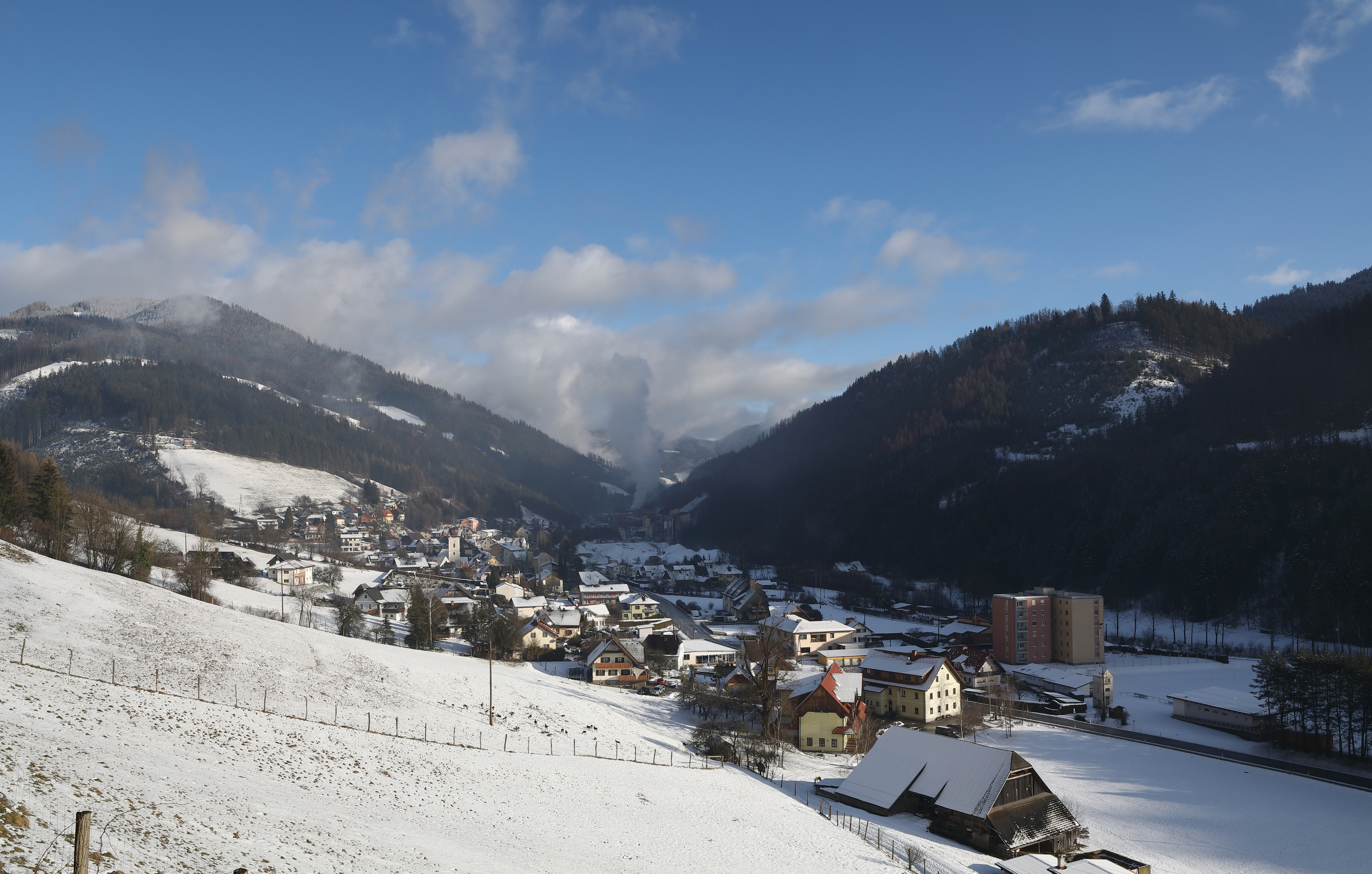
- Breitenau from west

- Coat of arms

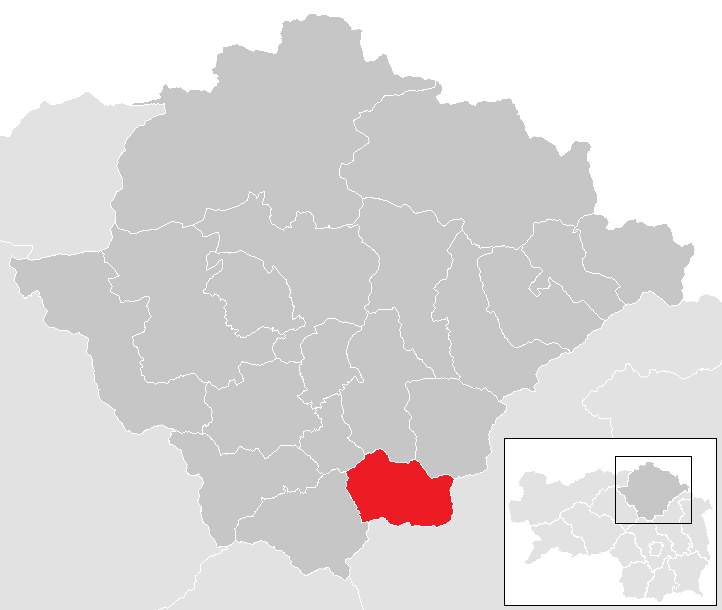
- Location within Bruck-Mürzzuschlag district

- Location within Austria
- Coordinates: 47°23′00″N 15°26′00″E
- Country: Austria
- State: Styria
- District: Bruck-Mürzzuschlag

Government
  - Mayor: Michael Brunner (SPÖ)

Area
  - Total: 62.45 km^{2} (24.11 sq mi)
- Elevation: 607 m (1,991 ft)

Population (2020-01-01)
  - Total: 1,646
  - Density: 26.36/km^{2} (68.26/sq mi)
- Time zone: UTC+1 (CET)
  - Summer (DST): UTC+2 (CEST)
- Postal code: 8614
- Area code: 03866
- Vehicle registration: BM
- Website: www.breitenau-hochlantsch.at

Breitenau am Hochlantsch is a municipality in the district of Bruck-Mürzzuschlag in Styria, Austria.
