= Sankt Sebastian, Styria =

Sankt Sebastian
- Former municipality
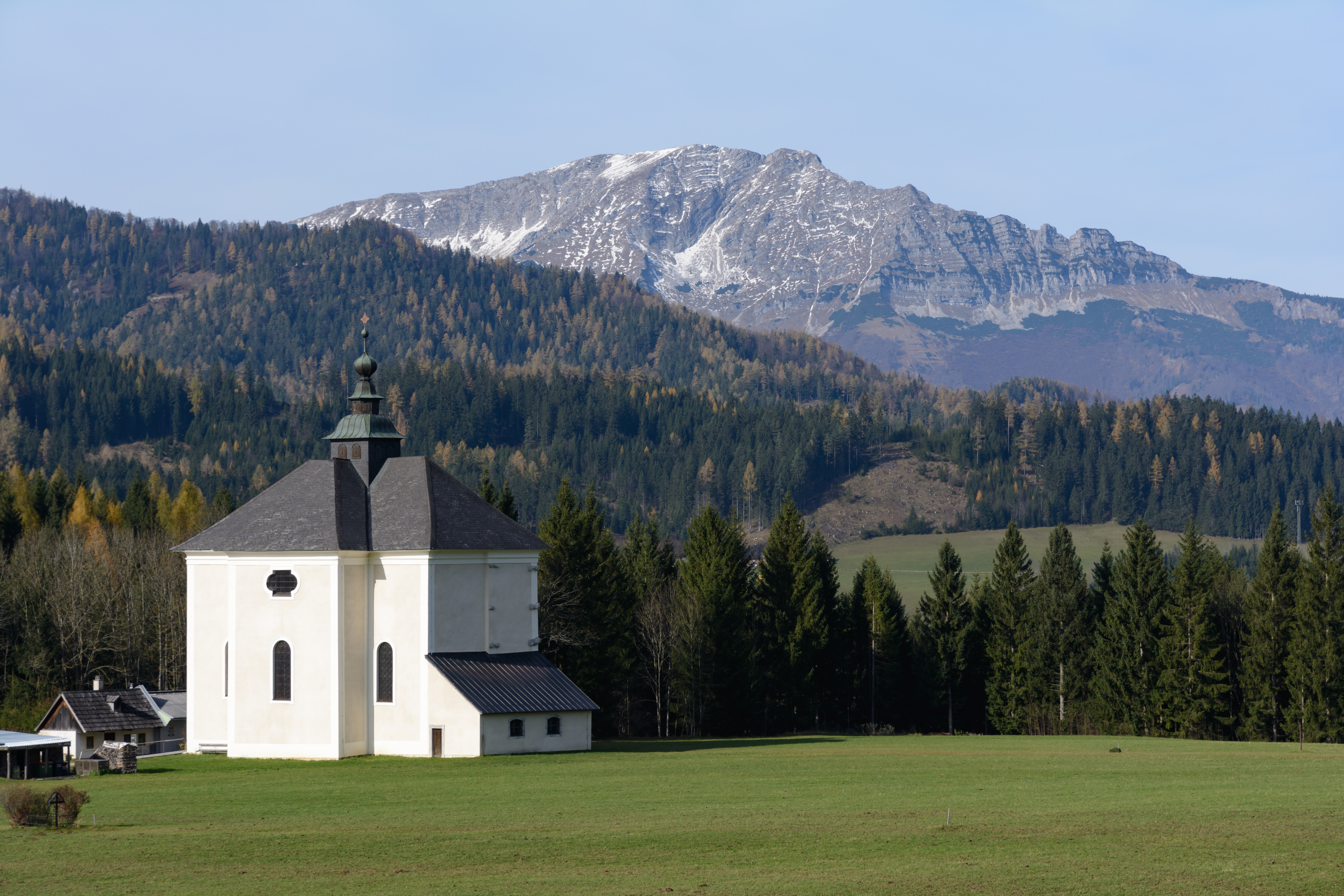
- Subsidiary church St. Sebastian with the Ötscher - view from St. Sebastian

- Coat of arms

- Location within Austria
- Coordinates: 47°47′06″N 15°18′30″E
- Country: Austria
- State: Styria
- District: Bruck-Mürzzuschlag

Area
  - Total: 47.4 km^{2} (18.3 sq mi)
- Elevation: 851 m (2,792 ft)

Population (1 January 2016)
  - Total: 1,015
  - Density: 21.4/km^{2} (55.5/sq mi)
- Time zone: UTC+1 (CET)
  - Summer (DST): UTC+2 (CEST)
- Postal code: 8630
- Area code: 03882
- Vehicle registration: BM
- Website: www.st-sebastian.at

Sankt Sebastian (Austrian German pronunciation: [saŋkt seˈbasti̯a(ː)n]) is a former municipality in the district of Bruck-Mürzzuschlag in the Austrian province of Styria. It lies some 1 kilometre (0.62 mi) to the north of the important pilgrimage centre of Mariazell. Since the 2015 Styria municipal structural reform, it is part of the municipality Mariazell.

Mariazell railway station, the terminus of the narrow gauge Mariazell line from St Pölten, lies within the municipality. The station is also the terminus of the Museumstramway Mariazell-Erlaufsee, a standard gauge heritage steam tramway that operates to the nearby Erlaufsee.
