= Langenwang =

- Municipality
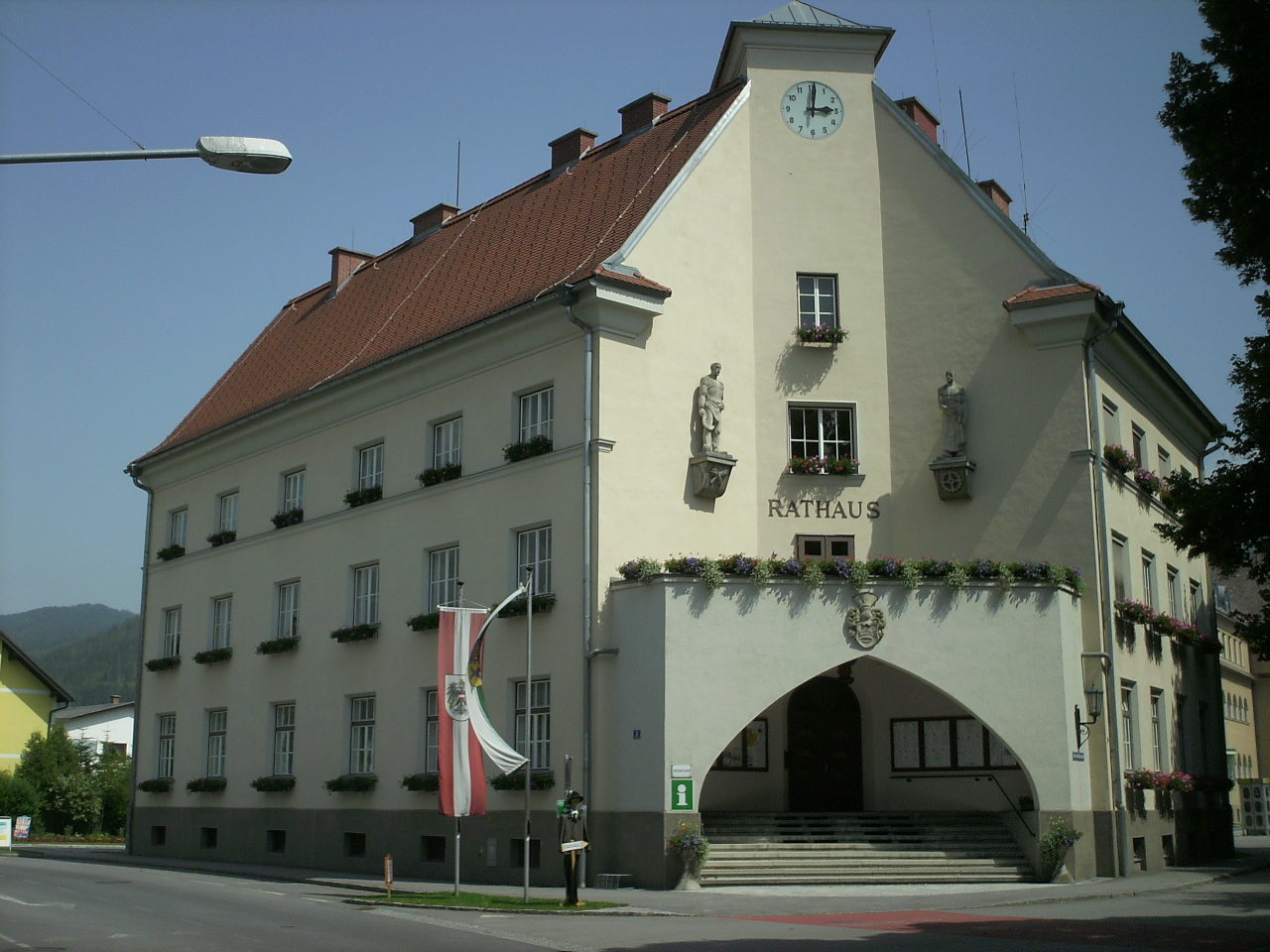
- Town hall

- Coat of arms

- Location within Austria
- Coordinates: 47°34′03″N 15°37′09″E
- Country: Austria
- State: Styria
- District: Bruck-Mürzzuschlag

Government
  - Mayor: Rudolf Hofbauer (ÖVP)

Area
  - Total: 76.07 km^{2} (29.37 sq mi)
- Elevation: 637 m (2,090 ft)

Population (2018-01-01)
  - Total: 3,868
  - Density: 50.85/km^{2} (131.7/sq mi)
- Time zone: UTC+1 (CET)
  - Summer (DST): UTC+2 (CEST)
- Postal code: 8665
- Area code: 03854
- Vehicle registration: BM
- Website: www.langenwang.at

Langenwang is a small town in the Austrian state of Styria.

== Populations ==
Historical population
Year	Pop.	±%
1869	1,910	—
1880	2,001	+4.8%
1890	2,507	+25.3%
1900	2,554	+1.9%
1910	2,535	−0.7%
1923	2,882	+13.7%
1934	3,626	+25.8%
1939	3,307	−8.8%
1951	3,401	+2.8%
1961	3,734	+9.8%
1971	4,082	+9.3%
1981	4,185	+2.5%
1991	4,188	+0.1%
2001	4,057	−3.1%
