= Neuberg an der Mürz =

- Municipality
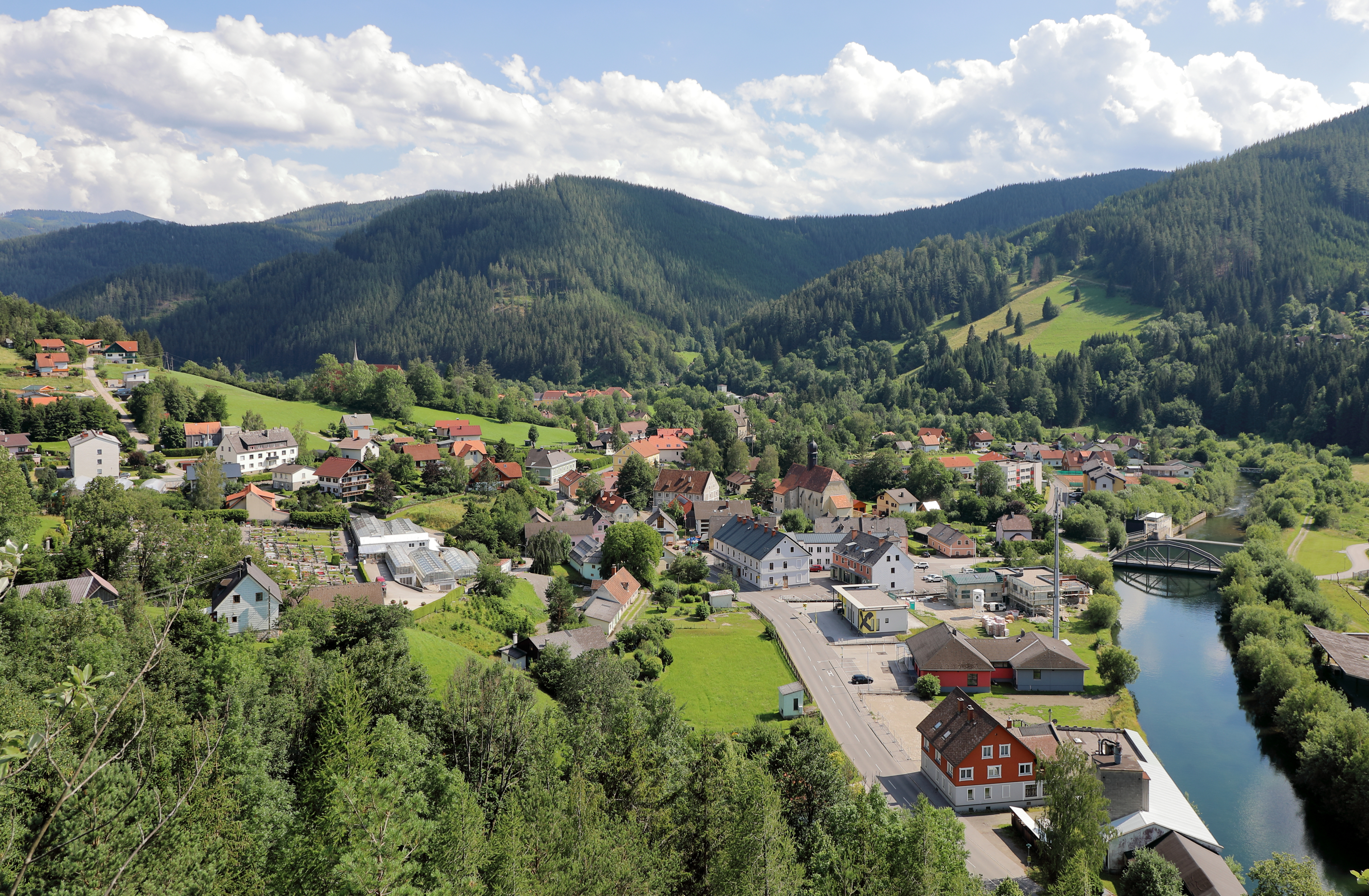
- North view of Neuberg

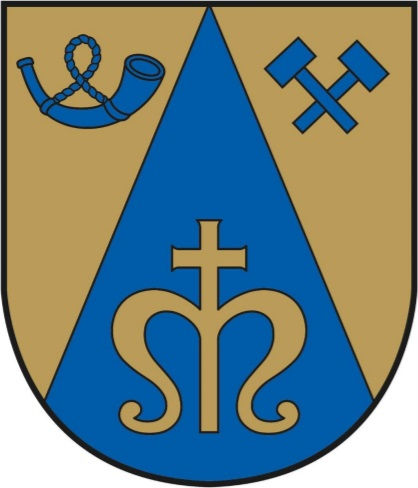
- Coat of arms

- Location within Austria
- Coordinates: 47°40′01″N 15°34′30″E
- Country: Austria
- State: Styria
- District: Bruck-Mürzzuschlag

Government
  - Mayor: Albert Felser (SPÖ)

Area
  - Total: 274.83 km^{2} (106.11 sq mi)
- Elevation: 732 m (2,402 ft)

Population (2018-01-01)
  - Total: 2,494
  - Density: 9.075/km^{2} (23.50/sq mi)
- Time zone: UTC+1 (CET)
  - Summer (DST): UTC+2 (CEST)
- Postal code: 8692
- Area code: +43 3857
- Vehicle registration: MZ
- Website: www.neuberg.at

Neuberg an der Mürz is a municipality in the district of Bruck-Mürzzuschlag in the Austrian state of Styria.

== Geography ==
Neuberg lies in the upper valley of the Mürz at the foot of the Schneealpe northwest of Mürzzuschlag.

== History ==
Otto, Duke of Austria founded Neuberg Abbey in 1327. The Treaty of Neuberg was signed there in 1379. The abbey was the center of settlement in the Mürz Valley. The abbey was suppressed in 1786 by Emperor Joseph II, and its church became the parish church of Neuberg. Following the suppression of the abbey, iron mining began, eventually becoming the dominant industry in the area. After the hunting privileges of the Habsburg family to the Vienna Woods were rolled back in 1848, the abbey became an imperial hunting lodge, hosting notable guests. The Upper Styrian coal and steel industry collapsed following the end of the Second World War, and Neuberg is now primarily known as a site of tourism.
