= Mürzhofen =

- Former municipality
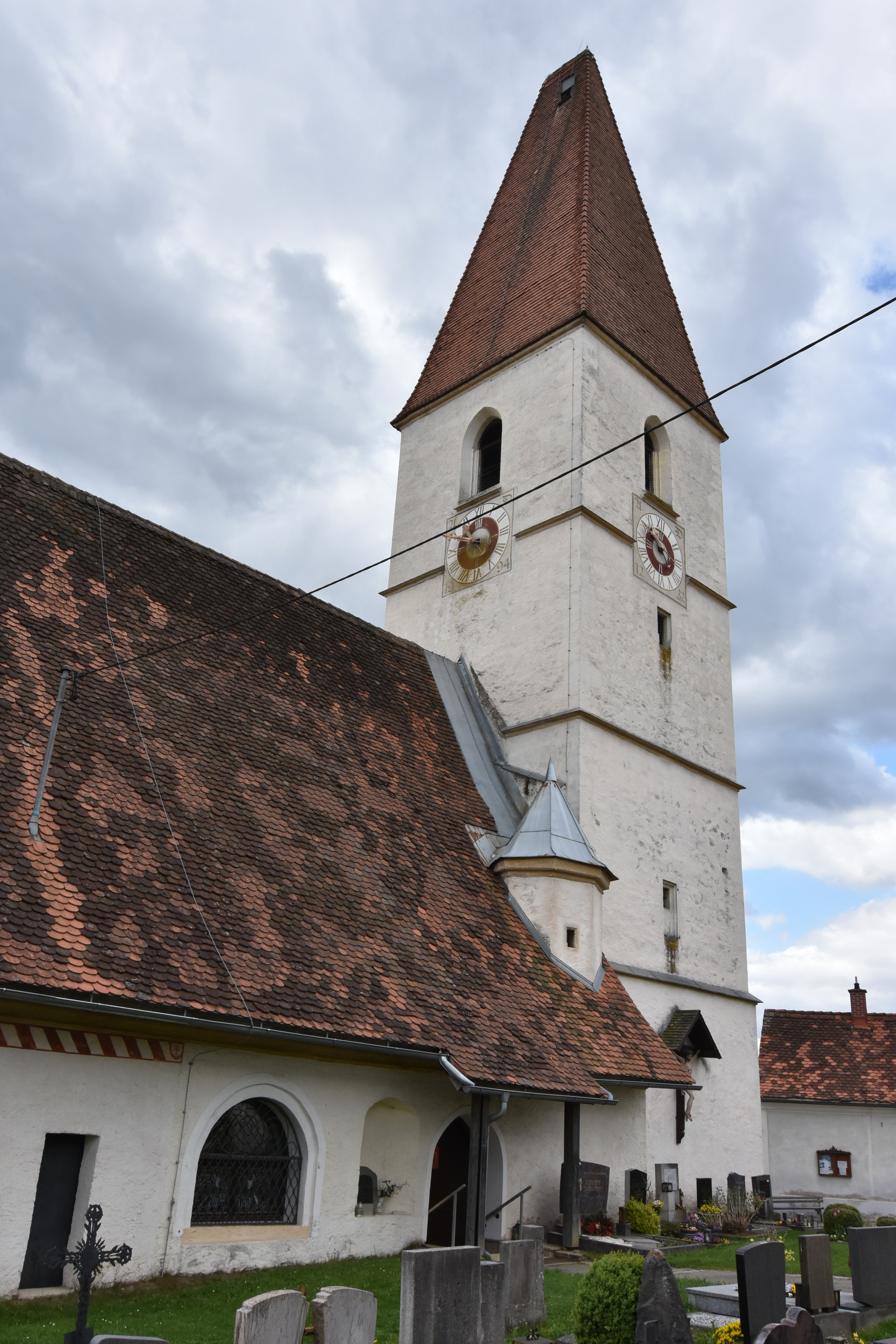
- Mürzhofen catholic church

- Location within Austria
- Coordinates: 47°29′08″N 15°23′44″E
- Country: Austria
- State: Styria
- District: Bruck-Mürzzuschlag

Area
  - Total: 1.92 km^{2} (0.74 sq mi)
- Elevation: 561 m (1,841 ft)

Population (2007-01-01)
  - Total: 959
  - Density: 499/km^{2} (1,290/sq mi)
- Time zone: UTC+1 (CET)
  - Summer (DST): UTC+2 (CEST)
- Postal code: 8644
- Area code: 03864
- Vehicle registration: MZ
- Website: www.muerzhofen.co.at

Mürzhofen was a municipality in Austria which merged in January 2015 into Kindberg in the Bruck-Mürzzuschlag District of Styria, Austria.
