= Parschlug =

- Former municipality
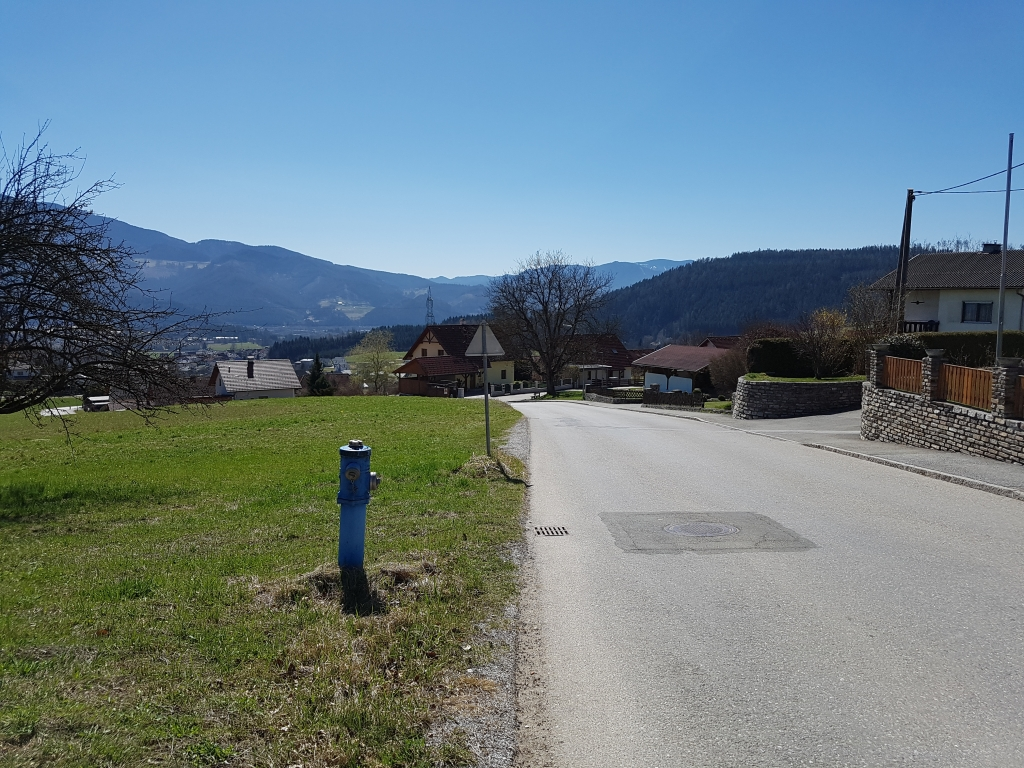
- Street in Pogier (part of Parschlug)

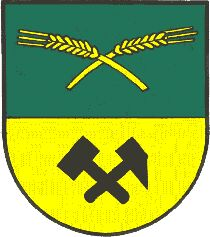
- Coat of arms

- Location within Austria
- Coordinates: 47°29′00″N 15°17′00″E
- Country: Austria
- State: Styria
- District: Bruck-Mürzzuschlag

Area
  - Total: 21 km^{2} (8.1 sq mi)
- Elevation: 700–1,487 m (2,297–4,879 ft)

Population (2014-01-01)
  - Total: 1,740
  - Density: 83/km^{2} (210/sq mi)
- Time zone: UTC+1 (CET)
  - Summer (DST): UTC+2 (CEST)
- Postal code: 8605
- Area code: 03862
- Vehicle registration: BM
- Website: www.parschlug.at

Parschlug was a municipality in Austria which merged in January 2015 into Kapfenberg in the Bruck-Mürzzuschlag District of Styria, Austria.

== Geography ==
Parschlug lies north of central Kapfenberg at the foot of the Zöbererhöhe.

Its boroughs were Parschlug, Pogier, Pönegg, and Göritz.

== History ==
The earliest surviving record of Parschlug appears in connection with a document gifting lands to Viktring Abbey, dating from 1203.

Around 1800 commercial exploitation of the local brown coal deposits began, and the modern municipality was founded in 1854.

== People ==
- Dr. Gerhard Prade KV:8b
