= Turnau, Styria =

Turnau
- Municipality
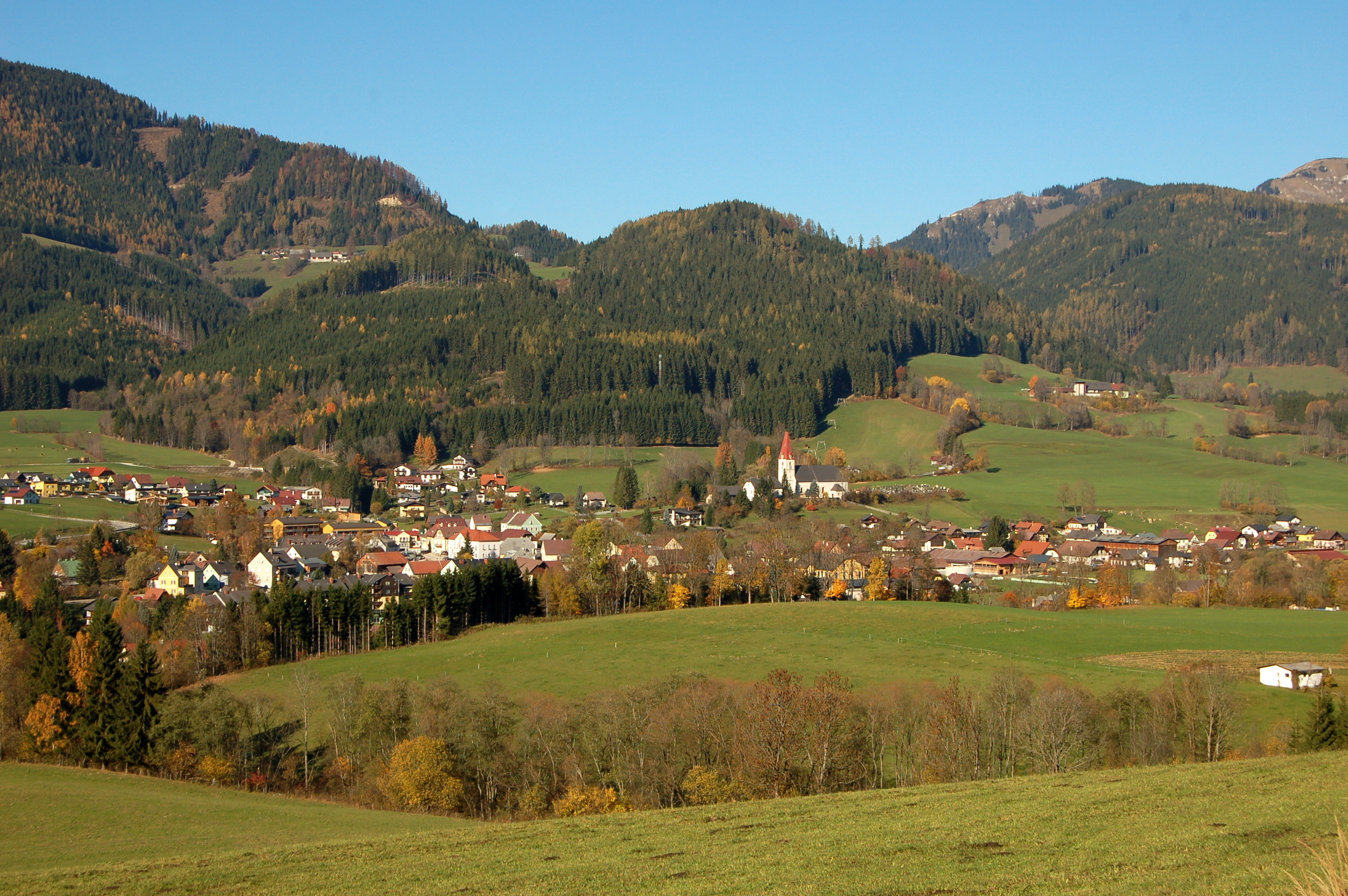
- Turnau from south

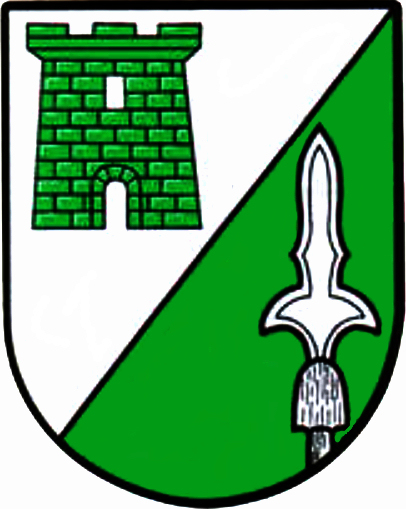
- Coat of arms

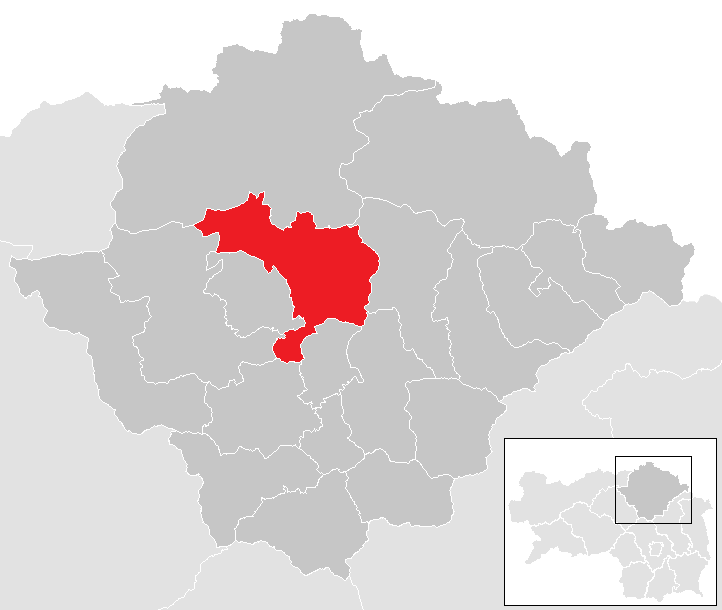
- Location within Bruck-Mürzzuschlag district

- Location within Austria
- Coordinates: 47°33′29″N 15°20′15″E
- Country: Austria
- State: Styria
- District: Bruck-Mürzzuschlag

Government
  - Mayor: Stefan Hofer (SPÖ)

Area
  - Total: 134.13 km^{2} (51.79 sq mi)
- Elevation: 755 m (2,477 ft)

Population (2018-01-01)
  - Total: 1,561
  - Density: 11.64/km^{2} (30.14/sq mi)
- Time zone: UTC+1 (CET)
  - Summer (DST): UTC+2 (CEST)
- Postal code: 8625, 8624, 8636
- Area code: +43 3863
- Vehicle registration: BM
- Website: www.turnau.at

Turnau is a market town at the foot of the Hochschwab in the Styrian District of Bruck-Mürzzuschlag.

== Boroughs ==
Turnau has five boroughs: Turnau, Göriach, Seewiesen, Stübming, and Thal.

== Politics ==
Turnau's mayor is Stefan Hofer of the SPÖ. In its municipal council (15 seats) the party mandates are as follows:

- 7 SPÖ
- 7 ÖVP
- 1 FPÖ
