= Sankt Marein im Mürztal =

- Municipality
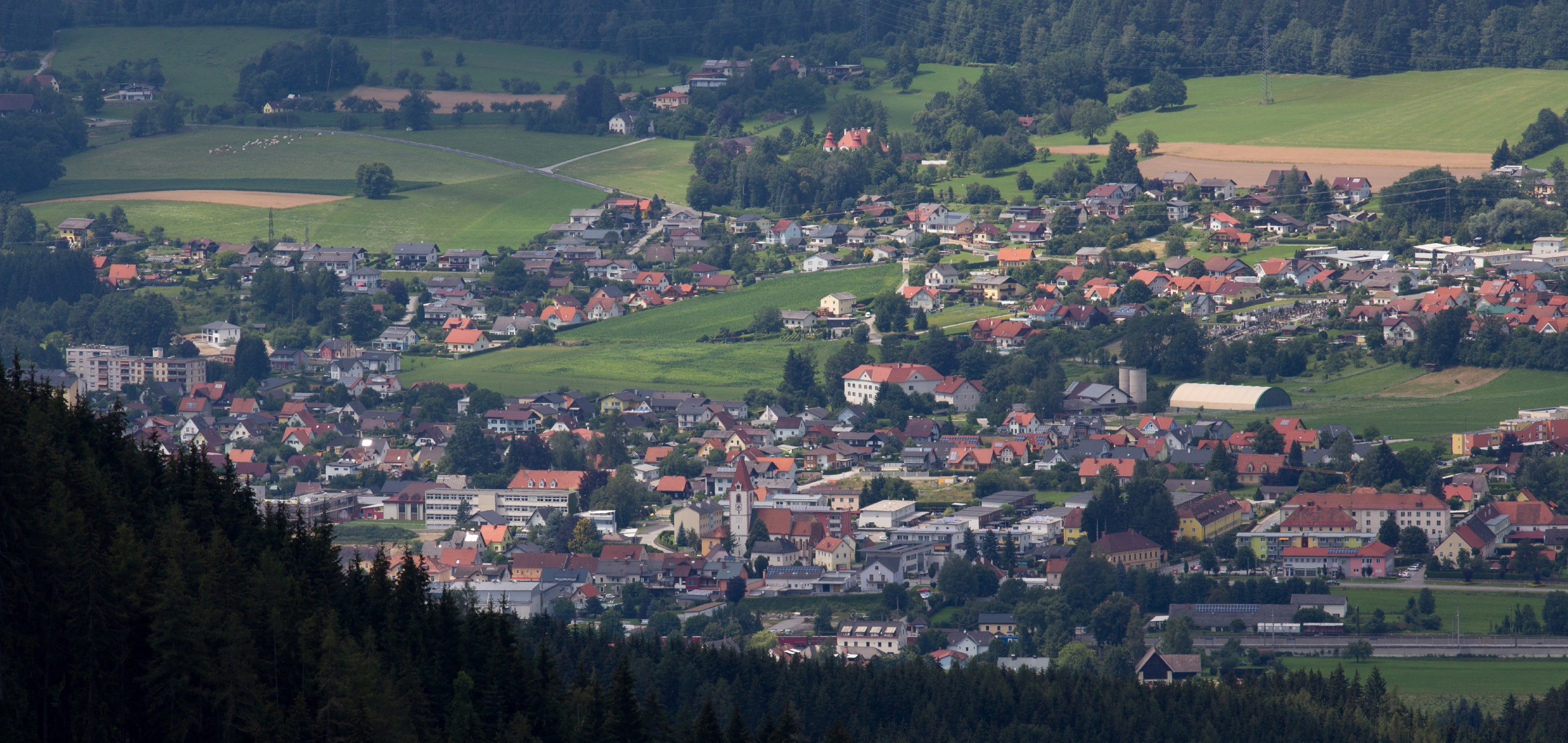

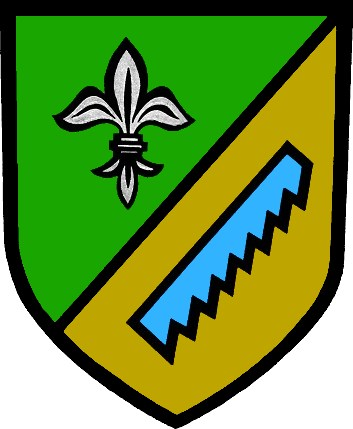
- Coat of arms

- Location within Austria
- Coordinates: 47°28′28″N 15°22′16″E
- Country: Austria
- State: Styria
- District: Bruck-Mürzzuschlag

Government
  - Mayor: Günther Ofner (ÖVP)

Area
  - Total: 29.49 km^{2} (11.39 sq mi)
- Elevation: 537 m (1,762 ft)

Population (2018-01-01)
  - Total: 2,713
  - Density: 92.00/km^{2} (238.3/sq mi)
- Time zone: UTC+1 (CET)
  - Summer (DST): UTC+2 (CEST)
- Postal code: 8641
- Area code: 03864
- Vehicle registration: BM
- Website: Official website

Sankt Marein im Mürztal is a municipality in the district of Bruck-Mürzzuschlag in Styria, Austria.

Red Bull founder and co-owner Dietrich Mateschitz was born here.
