= Mürzzuschlag =

- Municipality
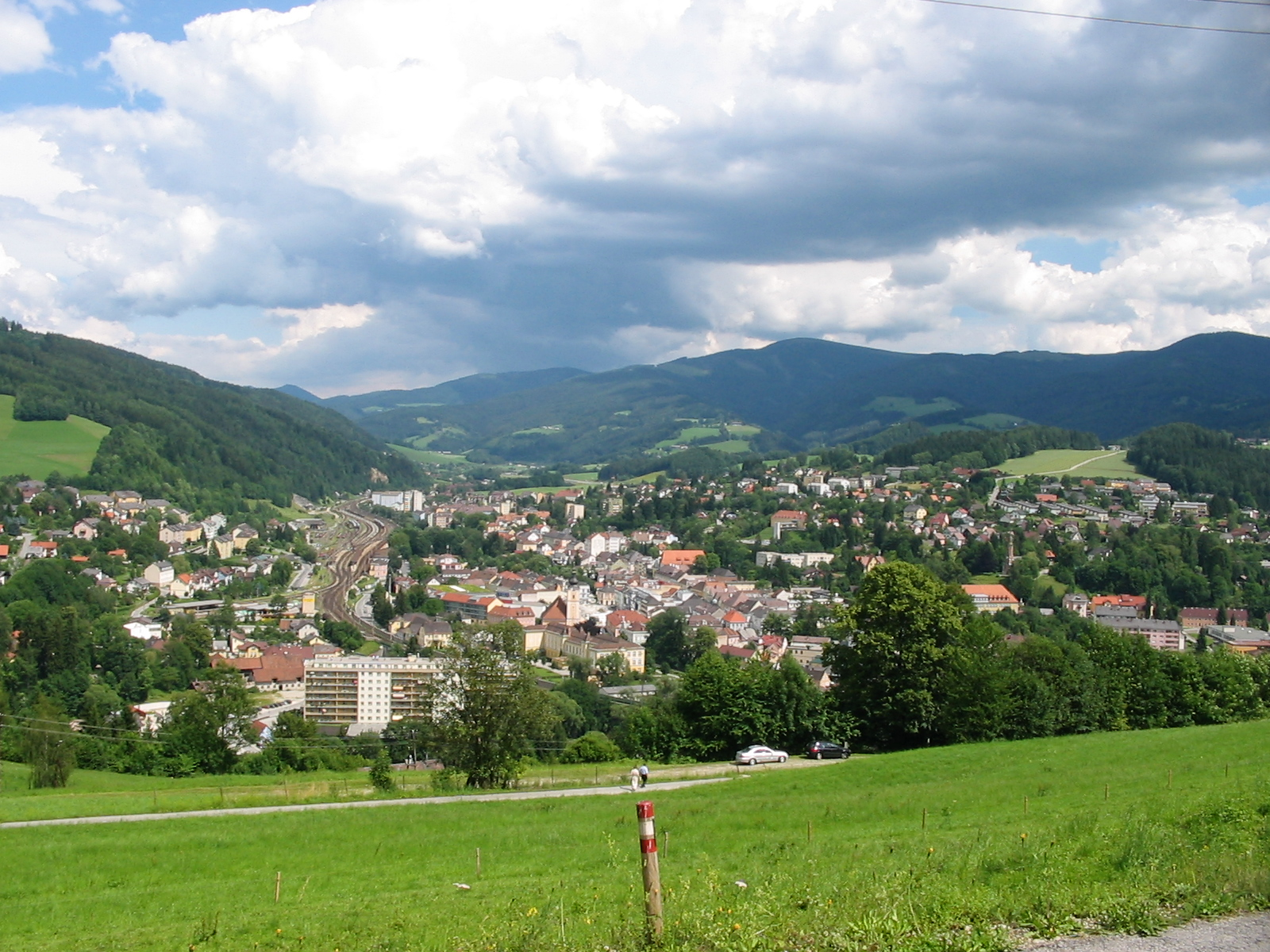

- Coat of arms

- Location within Austria Mürzzuschlag (Austria)
- Coordinates: 47°36′27″N 15°40′23″E
- Country: Austria
- State: Styria
- District: Bruck-Mürzzuschlag

Government
  - Mayor: Karl Rudischer (SPÖ)

Area
  - Total: 51.39 km^{2} (19.84 sq mi)
- Elevation: 670 m (2,200 ft)

Population (2018-01-01)
  - Total: 8,654
  - Density: 168.4/km^{2} (436.2/sq mi)
- Time zone: UTC+1 (CET)
  - Summer (DST): UTC+2 (CEST)
- Postal code: 8680
- Area code: 03852
- Vehicle registration: MZ
- Website: www.muerzzuschlag.at

Mürzzuschlag (German: [myɐ̯t͡sˈt͡suːʃlak]) is a town in northeastern Styria, Austria, the capital of the former Mürzzuschlag District. It is located on the Mürz river near the Semmering Pass, the border with the state of Lower Austria, about 85 km (53 mi) southwest of Vienna. The population is 8,684 (1 January 2016). Originally an industrial area, the nearby mountains are today a popular ski resort.

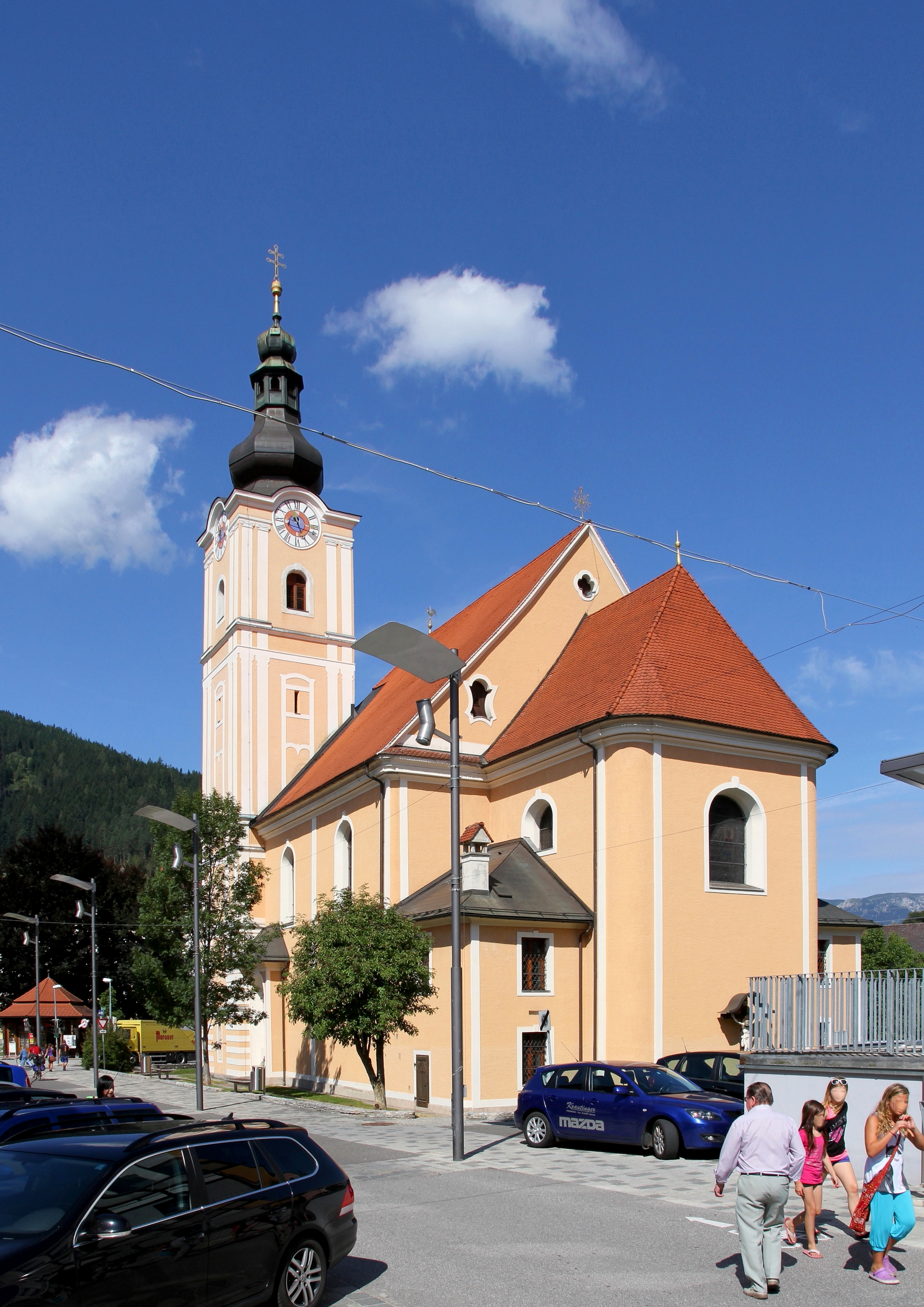
Church of St. Cunigunde

== History ==
The settlement in the Duchy of Styria was first documented in 1227. The minnesinger Ulrich von Liechtenstein in his 1265 poem Frauendienst mentioned Murzuslage, which he passed on his journey from Venice to Vienna. In 1360 the Habsburg duke Rudolf IV confirmed the inhabitants' privilege of iron production, competing with the town of Leoben.

In 1854 the Semmering railway opened, by which the Austrian Southern Railway company provided direct access to Vienna, largely promoting the local economy. The Bleckmann steel mill was founded in 1862, it is today part of Böhler-Uddeholm. A railway museum exhibits a collection of steam locomotives, associated equipment and rolling stock.

In the late 19th century, the mountainous Semmering area was the site of the first alpine skiing attempts in Central Europe, which made it one of the oldest ski resorts of Austria, documented by the world's largest skiing and winter sports museum. Mürzzuschlag received town privileges in 1923.

=== 1931 Workers' Olympiad ===
On February 5–8, 1931 the second winter Workers' Olympiad organised by the Socialist Workers' Sport International was held in the town. The games were larger (both in number of participants and spectators) than the 1932 Winter Olympics held in Lake Placid, New York, United States.

== Population ==
Historical population
Year	Pop.	±%
1869	3,197	—
1880	4,151	+29.8%
1890	5,285	+27.3%
1900	6,930	+31.1%
1910	8,805	+27.1%
1923	10,924	+24.1%
1934	9,911	−9.3%
1939	9,546	−3.7%
1951	11,175	+17.1%
1961	11,587	+3.7%
1971	11,587	+0.0%
1981	10,751	−7.2%
1991	9,990	−7.1%
2001	9,569	−4.2%
2011	8,745	−8.6%
2014	8,700	−0.5%

== Twin towns — sister cities ==
Mürzzuschlag is twinned with:

- Arusha, Tanzania
- Blansko, Czech Republic
- Chillán, Chile

== Notable people ==
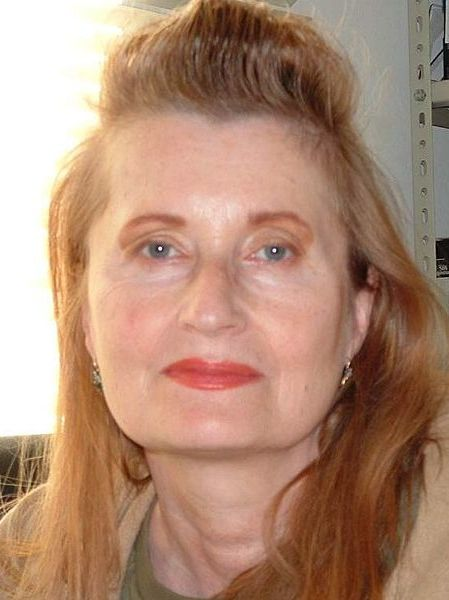
Elfriede Jelinek, 2004

- Johannes Brahms (1833–1897) wrote his Symphony No. 4 locally during his in 1884/1885 summer vacations, this led to the establishment of the local Brahms museum
- Rudolf Sanzin (1874–1922), an Austrian engineer and locomotive designer.
- Viktor Kaplan (1876–1934), engineer and inventor of the Kaplan turbine
- Claudio Arrau (1903–1991), Chilean pianist, lived his last years in Mürzzuschlag
- Jenny Jugo (1904–2001), actress, portrayed bouncy, assertive characters.
- Elfriede Jelinek (born 1946), playwright and novelist, awarded the 2004 Nobel Prize in Literature
- Johannes Wildner (born 1956), conductor and former member violinist with the Vienna Philharmonic.
- Helmut Brenner (1957–2017), an Austrian ethnomusicologist
