= Districts of Austria =

Administrative subdivision of Austria

Districts of Austria Österreichische Bezirke (German)
- Austria's 94 current districts. Statutory cities darkened.
- Category: District
- Location: Austria
- Found in: States (Länder)
- Number: 94 (as of 2022)
- Possible types: District Commissions; Statutory Cities
- Subdivisions: Municipalities (Gemeinde)

A district (German: Bezirk [bəˈtsɪʁk]; pl. Bezirke [bəˈtsɪʁkə]) is a second-level division of the executive arm of the Austrian government. District offices are the primary point of contact between residents and the state for most acts of government that exceed municipal purview: marriage licenses, driver licenses, passports, assembly permits, hunting permits, or dealings with public health officers for example all involve interaction with the district administrative authority (Bezirksverwaltungsbehörde).

Austrian constitutional law distinguishes two types of district administrative authority:

- district commissions (Bezirkshauptmannschaften), district administrative authorities that exist as stand-alone bureaus;
- statutory cities (Städte mit eigenem Statut or Statutarstädte), cities that have been vested with district administration functions in addition to their municipal responsibilities, i.e. district administrative authorities that only exist as a secondary role filled by something that primarily is a city (marked in the table with an asterisk (*).

As of 2017, there are 94 districts, of which 79 are districts headed by district commissions and 15 are statutory cities. Many districts are geographically congruent with one of the country's 113 judicial venues.

Statutory cities are not usually referred to as "districts" outside government publications and the legal literature. For brevity, government agencies will sometimes use the term "rural districts" (Landbezirke) for districts headed by district commissions, although the expression does not appear in any law and many "rural districts" are not very rural.

== District commissions ==
A district headed by a district commission typically covers somewhere between ten and thirty municipalities. As a purely administrative unit, a district does not hold elections and therefore does not choose its own officials. It is administered by the district commission (German: Bezirkshauptmannschaft, also translated as district authority). The district governor (Bezirkshauptmann / -frau) is appointed by the provincial governor; the district civil servants are province employees.

In the provincial laws of Lower Austria and Vorarlberg, districts headed by district commissions are called administrative districts (Verwaltungsbezirke). In Burgenland, Carinthia, Salzburg, Styria, Upper Austria, and Tyrol, the term used is political district (politischer Bezirk). National law, including national constitutional law, uses all three variants interchangeably. (Note: The 1849 Imperial Resolution creating the district system calls districts just that, "districts.")

The district commission is the representative organ of the state administration, and through that of the national administration. Its tasks include, for example:

- Issuing of identification documents, passports or driver's licenses
- Registration and regulation of companies and associations

District commissions were first introduced in 1849 during the rule of Franz Joseph I. In their current form they were defined in 1868, in a decree that stated that every province had to be divided into political subdivisions – districts – headed by a district governor. The 1868 Act establishing districts in their modern form adds the terms "administrative district" (Amtsbezirk) and "political administrative district" (politischer Amtsbezirk).

The 1920 Federal Constitutional Law prefers "district" but occasionally uses "political district" to emphasize is it not referring to judicial districts. Over the course of the dozens of revisions the Law has undergone since 1920, all occurrences of either were excised; the version currently in force still mentions district administrative authorities but no longer mentions districts.

The 1955 Austrian State Treaty contains a reference to the "administrative districts" of Carinthia, Burgenland, and Styria, even though local legal documents would have called them "political districts".

== Statutory cities ==
A statutory city is a city vested with both municipal and district administrative responsibility. Town hall personnel also serve as district personnel; the mayor also discharges the powers and duties of a head of district commission. City management thus functions both as a regional government and a branch of the national government at the same time.

Most of the 15 statutory cities are major regional population centers with residents numbering in the tens of thousands. The smallest statutory city is barely more than a village, but it owes its status to a quirk of history: Rust, Burgenland, current population 2000 (2021), has enjoyed special autonomy since it was made a royal free city by the Kingdom of Hungary in 1681; its privilege was grandfathered into the district system when Hungary ceded the region (later called Burgenland) to Austria in 1921.

The constitution stipulates that a community with at least 20,000 residents can demand to be elevated to statutory city status by its respective province, unless the province can demonstrate this would jeopardize regional interests, or unless the national government objects. The last community to have invoked this right is Wels, a statutory city since 1964. As of 2021, fifteen other communities are eligible but not interested.

The statutory city of Vienna, a community with well over 1.9 million residents, is divided into 23 municipal districts (Gemeindebezirke). Despite the similar name and the comparable role they fill, municipal districts have a different legal basis than districts. The statutory cities of Graz and Klagenfurt also have subdivisions referred to as "municipal districts," but these are merely neighborhood-size divisions of the city administration.

== Naming quirks ==
Austria strictly speaking does not name districts but district administrative authorities. The German term for "district commission" and "city," Bezirkshauptmannschaft and Stadt, respectively, is part of the official proper name of each such entity. This means that there can be pairs of districts whose two proper names contain the same toponym. Several such pairs do in fact exist. There are, for example, two district administrative authorities sharing the toponym Innsbruck: the (statutory) city of Innsbruck and the Innsbruck district commission.

To avoid confusion, the names of the rural districts in these pairs are commonly rendered with the suffix -Land, in this context roughly meaning "region." The customary name for the city of Innsbruck is Innsbruck, the customary name for the district headed by the Innsbruck district commission is Innsbruck-Land. While this usage is nearly universal both in the media and in everyday spoken German and even appears in the occasional government publication, the suffix -Land is not part of any official, legal designation in Lower Austria.

== History ==
=== Habsburg Monarchy and Austrian Empire ===
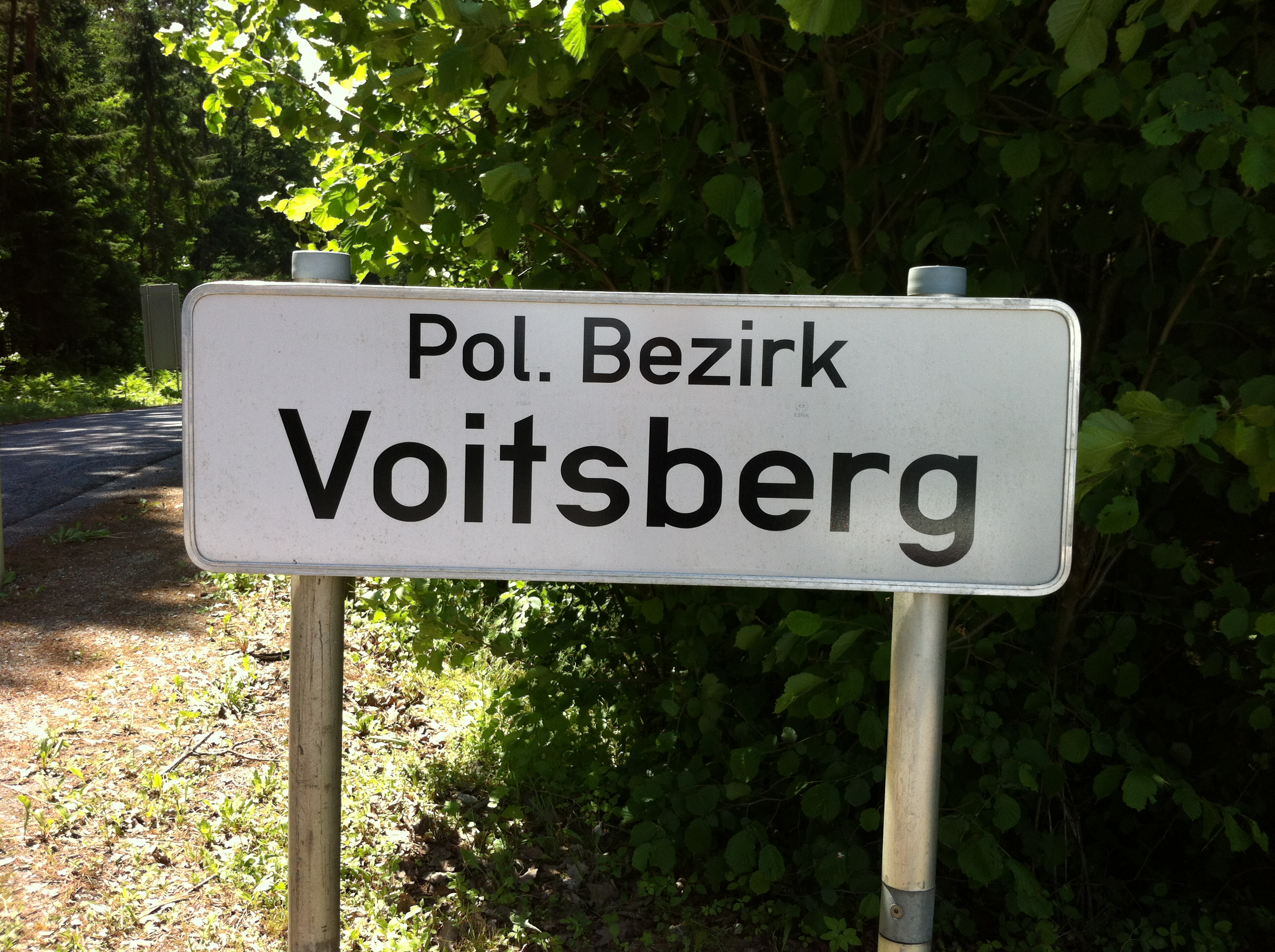
Voitsberg District district border sign

From the Middle Ages until the early nineteenth century, what would become the Austrian state – the Habsburg monarchy – was a large collection of formally separate feudal entities in a personal union under a single monarch of the house of Habsburg (Habsburg-Lorraine from 1780) rather than a single unified state. These entities were until the mid-eighteenth century absolute monarchies with no written constitution and no modern concept of the rule of law. Some of these entities lay within the Holy Roman Empire (the Erblande, the Lands of the Bohemian Crown, 1714–97 the Austrian Netherlands) while others lay outside it (the Kingdoms of Hungary and Croatia; from 1711 Transylvania; from 1772 Galicia and Lodomeria, among others). The modern state of Salzburg and parts of the surrounding states at this time belonged to the Prince-Archbishopric of Salzburg and numerous small enclaves belonging to other ecclesiastical principalities existed within the Erblande.

The states were ruled by the monarch, usually the emperor himself (Note: From the 15th century until the Empire's dissolution in 1806 the ruler of the Habsburg monarchy was almost always also the Holy Roman Emperor.) or a vassal of the emperor, supported by their personal advisors and the estates of the realm. The precise nature of the relationship between ruler and estates was different from region to region. Regional administrators were appointed by and answerable to the monarch.

The first step towards modern bureaucracy was taken by Empress Maria Theresa, who in 1753 imposed a system of 'circles'/districts (Kreise) (Note: Kreis(e) can be literally translated as 'circle(s)', but are often also translated as 'district(s)'. Kreis(e) should not be confused with Bezirk(e), which is also translated as 'district(s)'.) and 'circle'/district offices (Kreisämter) throughout most of her realms. The 'circles' of Upper and Lower Austria and Styria were largely based on the pre-existing quarters of those realms. A major break with tradition, the system was unpopular at first; "in some provinces considerable resistance had to be overcome." The district offices never became fully operational in the Kingdom of Hungary or the Austrian Netherlands.

In 1804, in response to the declaration of the First French Empire and the ongoing Napoleonic Wars, Holy Roman Emperor Francis II declared himself Francis I, Emperor of Austria and unified the Habsburg realms into the Austrian Empire, while also remaining Holy Roman Emperor. The formerly separate realms became crownlands of this new Empire; those which were part of the Holy Roman Empire remained part of both. Francis dissolved the Holy Roman Empire in 1806. As a result of the German mediatisations and the French Revolutionary and Napoleonic Wars, culminating in the 1815 Congress of Vienna, various territories, including Salzburg (until 1849 a 'circle' of Upper Austria), had become part of the new Empire, while other areas such as the Southern Netherlands and Further Austria (excluding Vorarlberg) had been lost.

Following the first wave of the revolutions of 1848, Emperor Ferdinand I and his minister of the interior, Franz Xaver von Pillersdorf, enacted Austria's first formal constitution. The constitution completely abolished the estates and called for a separation of executive and judicial authority, immediately crippling most existing regional institutions and leaving district offices as the backbone of the empire's administration. With Ferdinand having been forced to abdicate by a second wave of revolutions, his successor Franz Joseph I swiftly went to work transforming Austria from a constitutional monarchy back into an absolute one but kept relying on district offices at first. In fact, he strengthened the system.

His March Constitution retained the separation of judiciary and executive. It prescribed a partition of the empire into judicial venues, with courts to be headed by professional judges, and a separate partition into administrative districts, to be headed by professional civil servants. An 1849 Imperial Resolution fleshed out the details. The districts started functioning in 1850, many of them already in their present-day borders.

The March Constitution was never fully implemented and formally scrapped in 1851. Officially returning to full autocracy, the Emperor abolished the separation of powers. In 1853 Administrative districts were merged with judicial venues; district administrative authorities with district courts. During this period the Kreise were subdivided into Bezirke (or Amtsbezirke, 'office districts'), each with a Bezirksamt ('district office'). These were typically smaller than the modern districts; for example, Lower Austria, which is today divided into 24 districts, was divided into 70 Amtsbezirke. The crownlands of Carinthia, Carniola (now mostly part of Slovenia), Salzburg, Upper and Lower Silesia (now divided between the Czech Republic and Poland) and Bukovina (now divided between Romania and Ukraine) were not divided into Kreise but directly into Amtsbezirke. Vorarlberg was administered with Tyrol as Kreis Bregenz. This administrative structure did not apply to Lombardy–Venetia, Hungary (which at the time excluded Transylvania and the Voivodeship of Serbia and Banat of Temeschwar, which did use the system), or the Military Frontier; Croatia and Slavonia used the term Comitatus (contemporary German: Comitat, modern Komitat; Croatian: županija) in place of Kreis. Intellectuals aside, few objections were raised; the bulk of the population was still living and working on manorial lands and was still used to the lord of the manor being head of some form of manorial court.

=== Cisleithania ===
Following the Austro-Hungarian Compromise of 1867, Franz Joseph was forced to assent to the December Constitution, a set of five of Basic Laws that restored constitutional monarchy in Cisleithania. One of these Basic Laws, in particular, restored the separation of judiciary and executive. Pursuant to this stipulation, the merger of administrative and judicial districts was reversed the following year; the law in question established the districts in essentially their modern form. No attempt was made this time to impose the scheme on Hungary. The Kingdom of Hungary was now a separate country, fully independent in every respect save defense and international relations, and neither needed nor wanted to copy civil administration policies enacted in Vienna.

No significant changes were made between the 1868 restoration and the 1918 collapse of the Habsburg monarchy. Vienna was growing significantly during the late nineteenth and early twentieth centuries, absorbing dozens of suburbs. Three districts disappeared between 1891 and 1918 due to their domains being incorporated into the imperial capital wholesale. Two other districts lost parts of their territories to Vienna. Eleven new districts were carved out of existing districts between 1891 and 1918 due to general population growth.

=== First Republic ===
Following the collapse of the monarchy, the 1920 constitution of the First Austrian Republic retained the district system.

At least one of the principal framers, Karl Renner, had suggested to endow districts with county-like elected councils and some degree of legislative authority, but could not gain consensus for this idea.

The 1920 constitution characterizes Austria as a federal republic and its provinces as quasi-sovereign federated states.

A 1925 constitutional reform, a broad revision of general devolutionary tendency, transformed districts from divisions of the national executive into divisions of the new "state" executives. The replanting had virtually no practical consequences; enforcing national law and handling applications to the national government remain every district's main activities. Province governments have the authority to redraw district boundaries but can neither create nor dissolve districts, nor change how they work, without the assent of the cabinet.

In 1921, Hungary ceded the German-speaking part in the western region to Austria, this was created a new province and became Burgenland. While part of the Kingdom of Hungary, the rural border region had been partitioned into seven wards (Oberstuhlrichterämter), clusters of small towns and villages headed by a magistrate who served as both the district judge and the supervisor of the local administrators. Austria simply transformed the seven wards into seven new districts. The region also included two royal free cities, Eisenstadt and Rust; these were made into statutory cities, thus also becoming districts.

=== Land Österreich ===
With the March 1938 annexation of Austria into Nazi Germany, Austria initially became a state (Land) of the German Reich. In May, Vienna was expanded to create Greater Vienna (Groß-Wien), absorbing another four districts. Two weakly populated rural districts were discontinued as well.

In October, Burgenland was dissolved, its northern half being attached to Lower Austria and its southern half to Styria.

Between May 1939 and March 1940, Austria was dissolved. Its eight remaining provinces became seven Reichsgaue, answerable not to Vienna but directly to Berlin. Several statutory cities lost their special status and were incorporated into the respectively adjacent rural districts; the city of Krems on the other hand was promoted to district status. The districts otherwise remained intact, but they were now German Kreise instead of Austrian Bezirke.

=== Second Republic ===
Reborn with the downfall of Nazi Germany in 1945, the Republic of Austria immediately restored the administrative structure torn down between 1938 and 1940, putting the districts back in place. The only exception were the districts that had been absorbed into Vienna.

Austria had been divided into four occupation zones and jointly occupied by the United States, Soviet Union, United Kingdom, and France. Lower Austria, the region surrounding Vienna, was part of the Soviet zone. The capital itself was considered too valuable to be left to any one power and was, just like Berlin, separately divided into four sectors. In drafting their plans, the allies worked from the city's pre-1938 borders.

The Nazi expansion of Vienna, however, had made some sense. A number of rural areas incorporated into Greater Vienna were inimical. Most of Lower Austria had been leaning conservative to nationalist for a century; Vienna had been a bastion of Social Democracy for decades. The bureaucracy steering Vienna, a city of industry and finance, was sociologically distant from the agricultural countryside. Some of the suburbs affected, however, had long had much closer ties to the capital than to the rest of their former province, both socially and in terms of infrastructure. Permanently ejecting these suburbs from Vienna would have been inadvisable. Reaffirming the Nazi border changes either entirely or in part, on the other hand, would have led to demarcation discrepancies between Austrian and allied administrative divisions. Disputes regarding communal debt added to the problem.

Hotly contested between the Social Democrats dominating Vienna and the People's Party ruling Lower Austria, the question was not resolved until 1954. One of the traditional districts annexed by the city in 1938 was restored. Parts of several other traditional districts annexed were united to form a second new district.

In 1964, the city of Wels was elevated to statutory city status.

Two other new districts were established in 1969 and 1982, respectively.

Effective January 1, 2012, Styria merged the districts of Judenburg and Knittelfeld to form the Murtal district. The merger was part of program aimed at streamlining the regional bureaucracy. On January 1, 2013, three more mergers followed:

- Bruck an der Mur was merged with Mürzzuschlag,
- Hartberg with Fürstenfeld, and
- Feldbach with Radkersburg.

Effective January 1, 2017, Lower Austria split the district of Wien-Umgebung into parts which were merged with the districts of Bruck an der Leitha, Korneuburg, St. Pölten and Tulln.

== List of current districts ==
In Lower Austria only the suffix -Land is not part of the official name of the three districts using it. In cases where a statutory city and a rural district share the same toponym, the rural district has -Land or Umgebung attached to its name as a matter of customary usage to avoid ambiguity (officially in other parts of Austria). 12 of these 13 rural districts, with the exception of Salzburg-Umgebung, have their administrative centers located in the respective statutory cities, thus outside of the districts themselves. The districts Linz-Land and Urfahr-Umgebung both have Linz as their seat. The latter of these used to have its seat at the town of Urfahr, which became a borough of Linz.

M. = Municipalities (as of 2022); state capitals in bold

State	#	District * Statutory City	Est.	License plate(s)	Administrative seat	M.	Area km^{2}	Population 1 Jänner. 2021
Burgenland	101	**Eisenstadt***	1921	**E**	*	* 1	42.88	14,895
Burgenland	102	Rust*	1921	E (Note: Rust shares Eisenstadt's E code.)	*	* 1	20.01	2,000
Burgenland	103	Eisenstadt-Umgebung	1921	EU	Eisenstadt (Note: not part of the district)	23	453.14	43,861
Burgenland	104	Güssing	1921	GS	Güssing	28	485.34	25,770
Burgenland	105	Jennersdorf	1921	JE	Jennersdorf	12	253.34	17,109
Burgenland	106	Mattersburg	1921	MA	Mattersburg	19	237.83	40,316
Burgenland	107	Neusiedl am See	1921	ND	Neusiedl am See	27	1,038.64	60,397
Burgenland	108	Oberpullendorf	1921	OP	Oberpullendorf	28	701.44	37,453
Burgenland	109	Oberwart	1921	OW	Oberwart	32	732.58	54,209
Carinthia	201	**Klagenfurt am Wörthersee***	1850	**K**	*	* 1	120.12	101,765
Carinthia	202	Villach*	1932	VI	*	* 1	134.99	63,236
Carinthia	203	Hermagor	1868	HE	Hermagor-Pressegger See	7	808.13	18,052
Carinthia	204	Klagenfurt-Land	1868	KL	Klagenfurt am Wörthersee	19	765.64	60,503
Carinthia	205	St. Veit an der Glan	1868	SV	St. Veit an der Glan	20	1,493.58	53,880
Carinthia	206	Spittal an der Drau	1868	SP	Spittal an der Drau	33	2,764.99	75,628
Carinthia	207	Villach-Land	1868	VL	Villach	19	1,009.29	64,920
Carinthia	208	Völkermarkt	1868	VK	Völkermarkt	13	907.61	41,834
Carinthia	209	Wolfsberg	1868	WO	Wolfsberg	9	973.65	52,488
Carinthia	210	Feldkirchen	1982	FE	Feldkirchen in Kärnten	10	558.49	29,783
Lower Austria	301	Krems an der Donau*	1938	KS	*	* 1	51.66	24,837
Lower Austria	302	**St. Pölten***	1922	**P**	*	* 1	108.44	55,878
Lower Austria	303	Waidhofen an der Ybbs*	1868	WY	*	* 1	131.56	11,134
Lower Austria	304	Wiener Neustadt*	1866	WN	*	* 1	60.94	46,456
Lower Austria	305	Amstetten	1868	AM	Amstetten	33	1,187.73	116,592
Lower Austria	306	Baden	1868	BN	Baden	30	753.64	147,113
Lower Austria	307	Bruck an der Leitha	1868	BL, SW (Note: SW for the city of Schwechat, BL elsewhere.)	Bruck an der Leitha	33	703.11	105,507
Lower Austria	308	Gänserndorf	1901	GF	Gänserndorf	44	1,271.40	105,824
Lower Austria	309	Gmünd	1899	GD	Gmünd	21	786.39	36,275
Lower Austria	310	Hollabrunn	1868	HL	Hollabrunn	24	1,010.88	51,332
Lower Austria	311	Horn	1868	HO	Horn	20	784.00	30,838
Lower Austria	312	Korneuburg	1868	KO	Korneuburg	20	661.84	91,777
Lower Austria	313	Krems (Land)	1868	KR	Krems an der Donau	30	923.92	56,559
Lower Austria	314	Lilienfeld (Note: Lilienfeld was established in 1868, dissolved in 1890, and restored in 1897. From 1933 to 1938 Lilienfeld was a branch office of St. Pölten, from 1938 to 1945 a German Kreis, and from 1945 to 1952 a branch office of St. Pölten again. In 1953 it was restored to full district status once more.)	1868	LF	Lilienfeld	14	931.65	25,474
Lower Austria	315	Melk	1896	ME	Melk	40	1,013.56	78,281
Lower Austria	316	Mistelbach	1868	MI	Mistelbach	36	1,291.72	75,655
Lower Austria	317	Mödling	1897	MD	Mödling	20	276.99	119,240
Lower Austria	318	Neunkirchen	1868	NK	Neunkirchen	44	1,146.92	86,323
Lower Austria	319	St. Pölten (Land)	1868	PL	St. Pölten	45	1,286.88	132,064
Lower Austria	320	Scheibbs	1868	SB	Scheibbs	18	1,023.46	41,567
Lower Austria	321	Tulln	1892	KG, TU (Note: KG for the city of Klosterneuburg, TU elsewhere.)	Tulln an der Donau	22	734.42	105,762
Lower Austria	322	Waidhofen an der Thaya	1868	WT	Waidhofen an der Thaya	15	669.03	25,531
Lower Austria	323	Wiener Neustadt (Land)	1868	WB	Wiener Neustadt	35	969.84	79,033
Lower Austria	325	Zwettl	1868	ZT	Zwettl-Niederösterreich	24	1,399.99	41,827
Upper Austria	401	**Linz***	1866	**L**	*	* 1	95.99	206,537
Upper Austria	402	Steyr*	1867	SR	*	* 1	26.56	37,952
Upper Austria	403	Wels*	1964	WE	*	* 1	45.92	62,654
Upper Austria	404	Braunau	1868	BR	Braunau am Inn	46	1,040.84	106,492
Upper Austria	405	Eferding	1907	EF	Grieskirchen (Note: Eferding and Grieskirchen districts share one common district commission (Districtal association).)	12	259.72	33,368
Upper Austria	406	Freistadt	1868	FR	Freistadt	27	993.96	66,922
Upper Austria	407	Gmunden	1868	GM	Gmunden	20	1,431.58	102,102
Upper Austria	408	Grieskirchen	1911	GR	Grieskirchen	33	579.06	65,137
Upper Austria	409	Kirchdorf	1868	KI	Kirchdorf an der Krems	23	1,240.01	57,163
Upper Austria	410	Linz-Land	1868	LL	Linz	22	460.41	152,391
Upper Austria	411	Perg	1868	PE	Perg	26	613.52	69,241
Upper Austria	412	Ried	1868	RI	Ried im Innkreis	36	584.96	61,850
Upper Austria	413	Rohrbach	1868	RO	Rohrbach-Berg	37	817.58	56,623
Upper Austria	414	Schärding	1868	SD	Schärding	30	618.44	57,438
Upper Austria	415	Steyr-Land	1868	SE	Steyr	20	971.73	60,936
Upper Austria	416	Urfahr-Umgebung	1919	UU	Linz	27	659.67	86,235
Upper Austria	417	Vöcklabruck	1868	VB	Vöcklabruck	52	1,084.85	137,993
Upper Austria	418	Wels-Land	1868	WL	Wels	24	457.71	74,574
Salzburg	501	**Salzburg***	1869	**S**	*	* 1	65.65	155,416
Salzburg	502	Hallein	1896	HA	Hallein	13	668.35	60,992
Salzburg	503	Salzburg-Umgebung	1868	SL	Seekirchen am Wallersee	37	1,004.47	154,624
Salzburg	504	St. Johann im Pongau	1868	JO	St. Johann im Pongau	26	1,755.37	81,392
Salzburg	505	Tamsweg	1868	TA	Tamsweg	15	1,019.65	20,118
Salzburg	506	Zell am See	1868	ZE	Zell am See	28	2,641.07	88,168
Styria	601	**Graz***	1850	**G**	*	* 1	127.57	291,134
Styria	603	Deutschlandsberg	1868	DL	Deutschlandsberg	15	863.47	60,871
Styria	606	Graz-Umgebung	1868	GU	Graz	36	1,084.55	157,853
Styria	610	Leibnitz	1868	LB	Leibnitz	29	749.97	85,294
Styria	611	Leoben	1868	LE, LN (Note: LE for the city of Leoben, LN elsewhere.)	Leoben	16	1,053.49	59,151
Styria	612	Liezen	1868	GB, LI (Note: GB for subdistrict (Expositur) Gröbming; LI elsewhere.)	Liezen	29	3,318.72	79,592
Styria	614	Murau	1868	MU	Murau	14	1,385.48	27,449
Styria	616	Voitsberg	1891	VO	Voitsberg	15	678.18	50,947
Styria	617	Weiz	1868	WZ	Weiz	31	1,097.94	90,916
Styria	620	Murtal	2012	MT	Judenburg	20	1,675.81	71,356
Styria	621	Bruck-Mürzzuschlag	2013	BM	Bruck an der Mur	19	2,156.93	98,054
Styria	622	Hartberg-Fürstenfeld	2013	HF	Hartberg	36	1,224.28	90,619
Styria	623	Südoststeiermark	2013	SO	Feldbach	25	982.96	83,841
Tyrol	701	**Innsbruck***	1850	**I**	*	* 1	104.91	131,059
Tyrol	702	Imst	1868	IM	Imst	24	1,724.96	60,922
Tyrol	703	Innsbruck-Land	1868	IL	Innsbruck	63	1,990.17	181,698
Tyrol	704	Kitzbühel	1868	KB	Kitzbühel	20	1,163.30	64,676
Tyrol	705	Kufstein	1868	KU	Kufstein	30	969.97	111,080
Tyrol	706	Landeck	1868	LA	Landeck	30	1,595.14	44,346
Tyrol	707	Lienz	1868	LZ	Lienz	33	2,020.08	48,814
Tyrol	708	Reutte	1868	RE	Reutte	37	1,236.67	33,054
Tyrol	709	Schwaz	1868	SZ	Schwaz	39	1,843.18	84,456
Vorarlberg	801	Bludenz	1868	BZ	Bludenz	29	1,287.64	64,666
Vorarlberg	802	**Bregenz**	1868	B	Bregenz	40	863.36	136,107
Vorarlberg	803	Dornbirn	1969	DO	Dornbirn	3	172.36	90,860
Vorarlberg	804	Feldkirch	1868	FK	Feldkirch	24	278.31	109,974
Vienna	901	**Wien***	1850	**W**	*	* 1	414.82	1,920,949

== Historical districts ==
This section only lists districts covering regions that are still part of present-day Austria. Districts lost following the dissolution of Cisleithania in 1918 are omitted.

Code	District	Years	License plate	Administrative seat	Population 2011
–	Floridsdorf	1897–1905	–	Floridsdorf	
–	Floridsdorf Umgebung	1906–1938	–	Floridsdorf	
–	Gröbming	1868–1938	–	Gröbming	
–	Groß-Enzersdorf	1868–1896	–	Groß-Enzersdorf	
–	Hernals	1868–1891	–	Hernals	
–	Hietzing	1868–1891	–	Hietzing	
–	Hietzing Umgebung	1892–1938	–	Hietzing	
–	Pöggstall	1899–1938	–	Pöggstall	
–	Sechshaus	1868–1891	–	Sechshaus	
–	Urfahr	1903–1919	–	Urfahr	
–	Währing	1868–1892	–	Währing	
324	Wien-Umgebung	1954–2016	WU, SW (Note: SW for the city of Schwechat, WU elsewhere.)	Klosterneuburg	117,343
602	Bruck an der Mur	1868–2012	BM	Bruck an der Mur	62,000
604	Feldbach	1868–2012	FB	Feldbach, Styria	67,046
605	Fürstenfeld	1938–2012	FF	Fürstenfeld	23,000
607	Hartberg	1868–2012	HB	Hartberg	66,000
608	Judenburg	1868–2011	JU	Judenburg	44,983
609	Knittelfeld	1946–2011	KF	Knittelfeld	29,095
613	Mürzzuschlag	1903–2012	MZ	Mürzzuschlag	40,207
615	Radkersburg	1868–2012	RA	Bad Radkersburg	22,911

== See also ==
- District Captaincy (Austria)
