= Aflenz Kurort =

- Former municipality
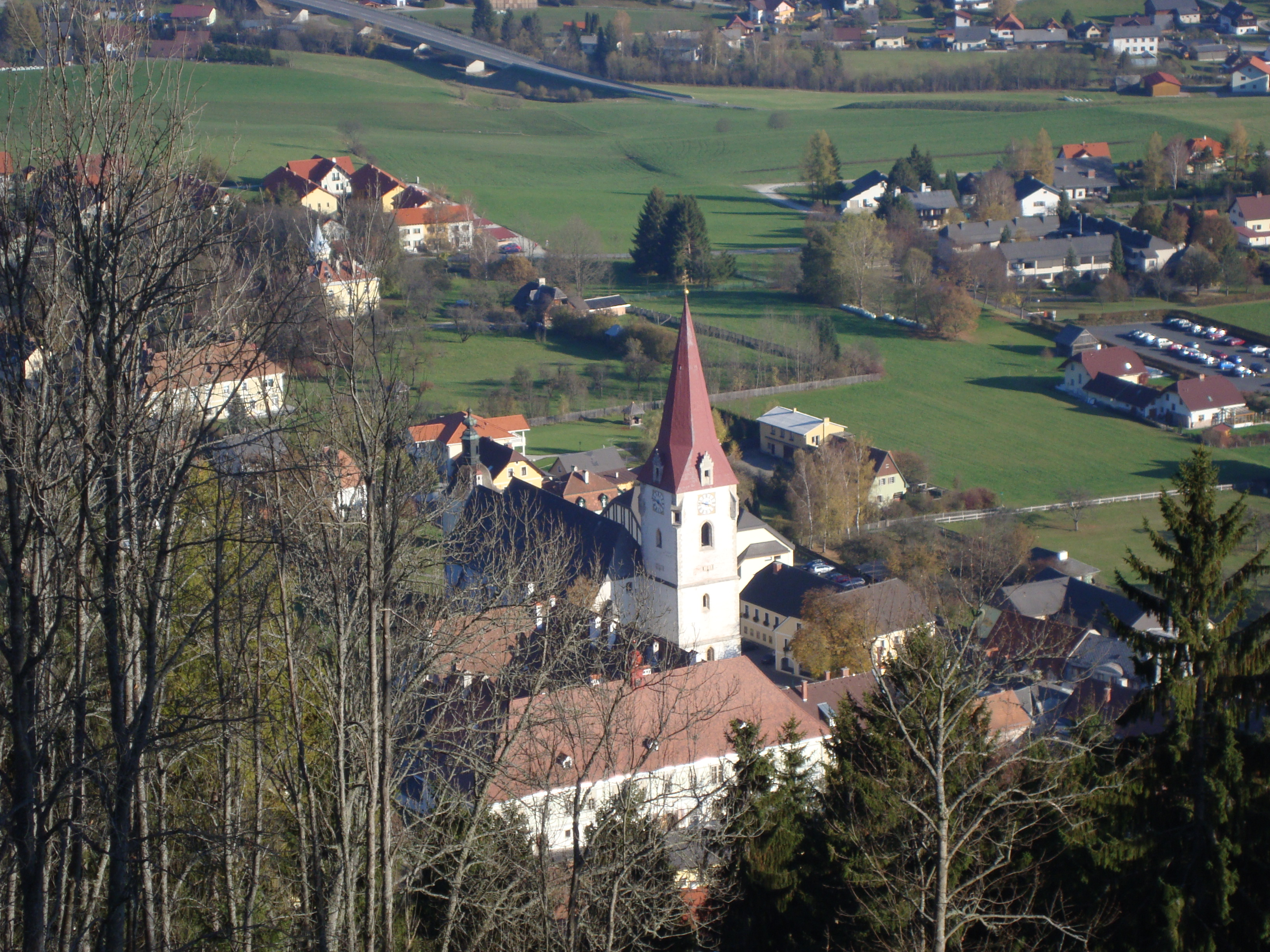

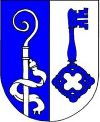
- Coat of arms

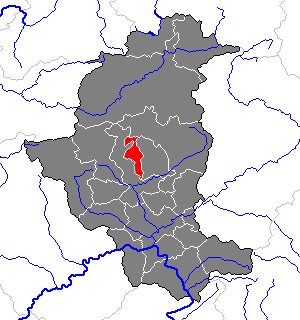
- Location within Bruck-Mürzzuschlag district

- Location within Austria
- Coordinates: 47°32′37″N 15°14′20″E
- Country: Austria
- State: Styria
- District: Bruck-Mürzzuschlag

Area
  - Total: 16.1 km^{2} (6.2 sq mi)
- Elevation: 765–1,810 m (2,510–5,938 ft)

Population (2014-01-01)
  - Total: 1,001
  - Density: 62.2/km^{2} (161/sq mi)
- Time zone: UTC+1 (CET)
  - Summer (DST): UTC+2 (CEST)
- Postal code: 8623
- Area code: 03861
- Vehicle registration: BM
- Website: www.aflenz-kurort.at

Aflenz Kurort was a municipality in Austria which merged in January 2015 into Aflenz in the Bruck-Mürzzuschlag District of Styria, Austria.

== Geography ==
There was only one borough in Aflenz: Aflenz-Kurort.

Neighboring communities were: Aflenz Land, Thörl, Etmißl, Sankt Ilgen, and Turnau.

== History ==
"Avelniz" was first documented in 1025. Until its abolishment, the Abbots of St. Lambrecht owned and administered the municipality's land. The territory of the current municipality was part of the Duchy of Styria, which had been detached from Bavaria in 1180. Beginning in 1192, Styria and Austria were joined in a personal union. Aflenz received the status of a market town in 1458 from Emperor Frederick III. From 1564, Styria was counted as part of Inner Austria and, from 1804 onwards, as part of the Austrian Empire. Summer tourism to the area had already begun in the late 19th century. Aflenz was part of the Republic of Austria established in 1918. After the Anschluss of Austria, the community belonged to the Reichsgau Steiermark until the war's end. From 1945 to 1955, Aflenz was part of the English Occupation Zone. Its first ski lift was built in 1954.

== Politics ==
Aflenz' last mayor was Hanns Finding, D.Eng.

The results of 2005 election were as follows: ÖVP: 32.8%, SPÖ: 12.5%, FPÖ: 5.4%, Aflenz-Aktiv: 5.77%, and Gemeinsam für Aflenz (GFA): 43.54%.

As of 1 January 2015 Aflenz Kurort has been amalgamated with Aflenz Land municipality into Marktgemeinde Aflenz (i.e. Aflenz Market Town)

== Coat of arms ==
"A shield divided in two, on the left side of which is a silver bishop's crosier on a blue background and on the right side a blue key on a silver background."
