= Grüner See (Styria) =

Lake in Austria

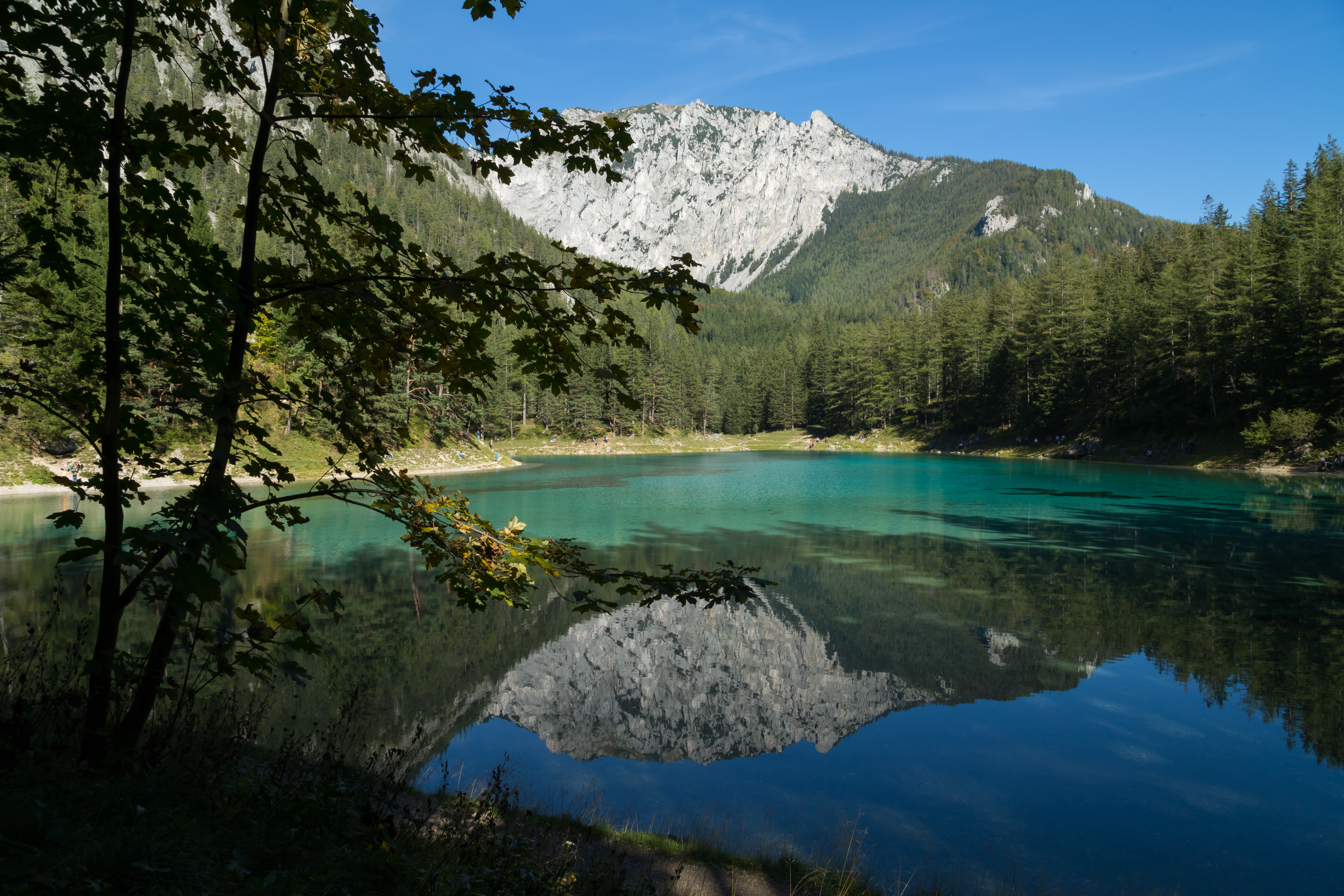

- Location within Styria
- Location: Tragöß, Styria, Austria
- Coordinates: 47°32′30″N 15°3′21″E
- Basin countries: Austria
- Max. depth: up to 12 m (39 ft)

Grüner See (Green Lake) is a lake in Styria, Austria in a village named Tragöß, which is part of the municipality Tragöß-Sankt Katharein. The lake is surrounded by forests and three mountains: Pribitz (1,579 m), Meßnerin (1,835 m) and Trenchtling (Hochturm) (2,081 m), all part of the Hochschwab Mountains. The name "Green Lake" originated because of its emerald-green water. The clean and clear water comes from the snowmelt from the karst mountains and has a temperature of 6–7 °C (43–45 °F). During winter, the lake is only 1–2 m (3–7 ft) deep and the surrounding area is used as a county park.

However, in spring, when the temperature rises and snow melts, the basin of land below the mountains fills with water. The lake reaches its maximum depth of around 12 m (39 ft) from mid-May to June and is claimed to look the most beautiful at this time. In July, the water begins to recede.

The lake supports a variety of fauna such as snails, water fleas (Daphnia pulex), small crabs, fly larvae, and different species of trout (Salmo). The flora is not abundant because of the rocky bottom of the lake. Furthermore, the lake's depth is variable since its inflow comes from snowmelt.

The lake used to be popular among divers who could observe the green meadows in the edge zone of the lake particularly in June when the water is at its highest. A bridge and a bench could also be found underwater. Furthermore, trails and trees could also be seen underwater.

Because of the spike in tourist visits that has occurred and expected damage to this sensitive environment, the use of this lake for all watersports activities has been prohibited since 1 January 2016.

== Gallery ==
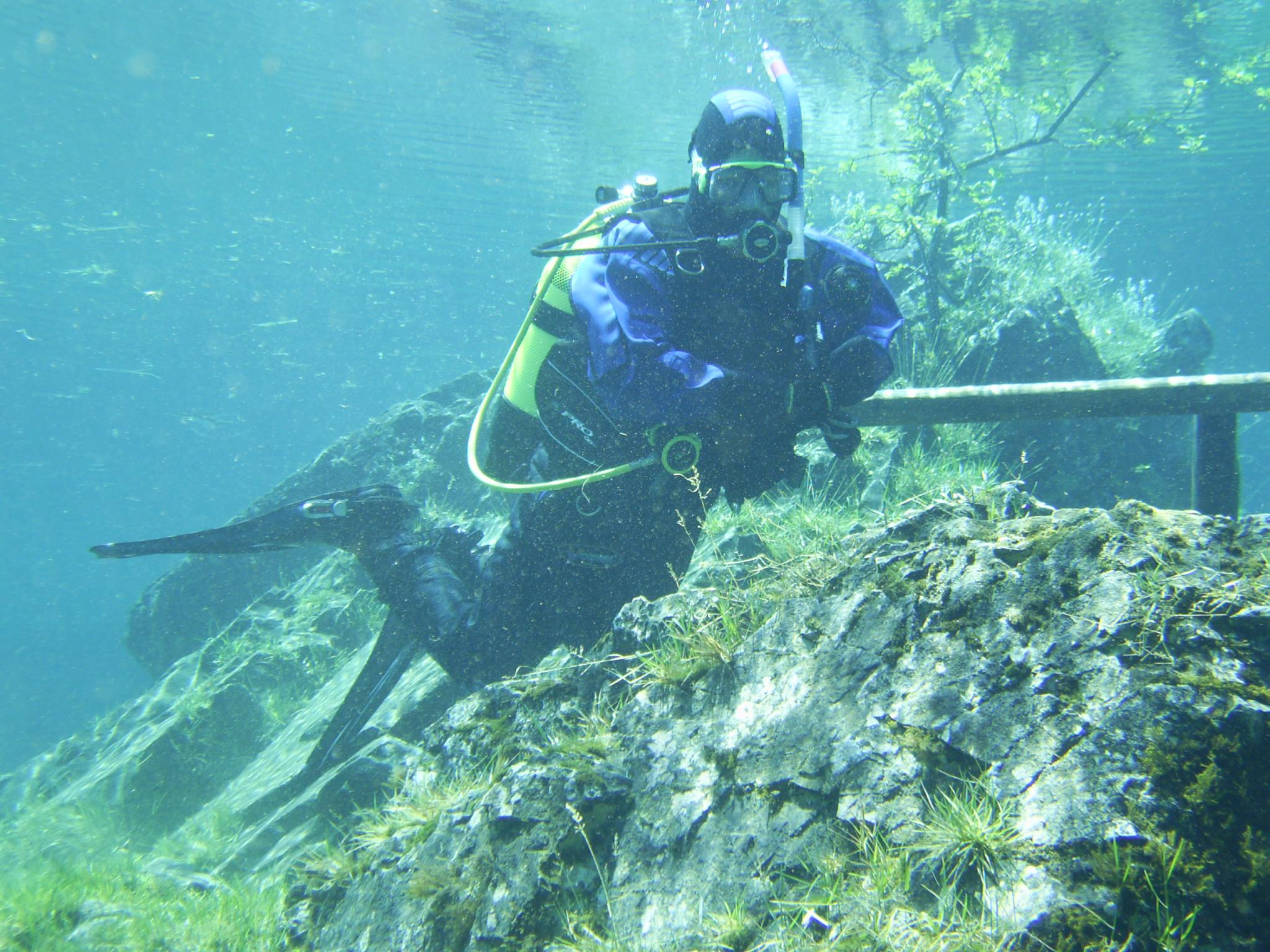

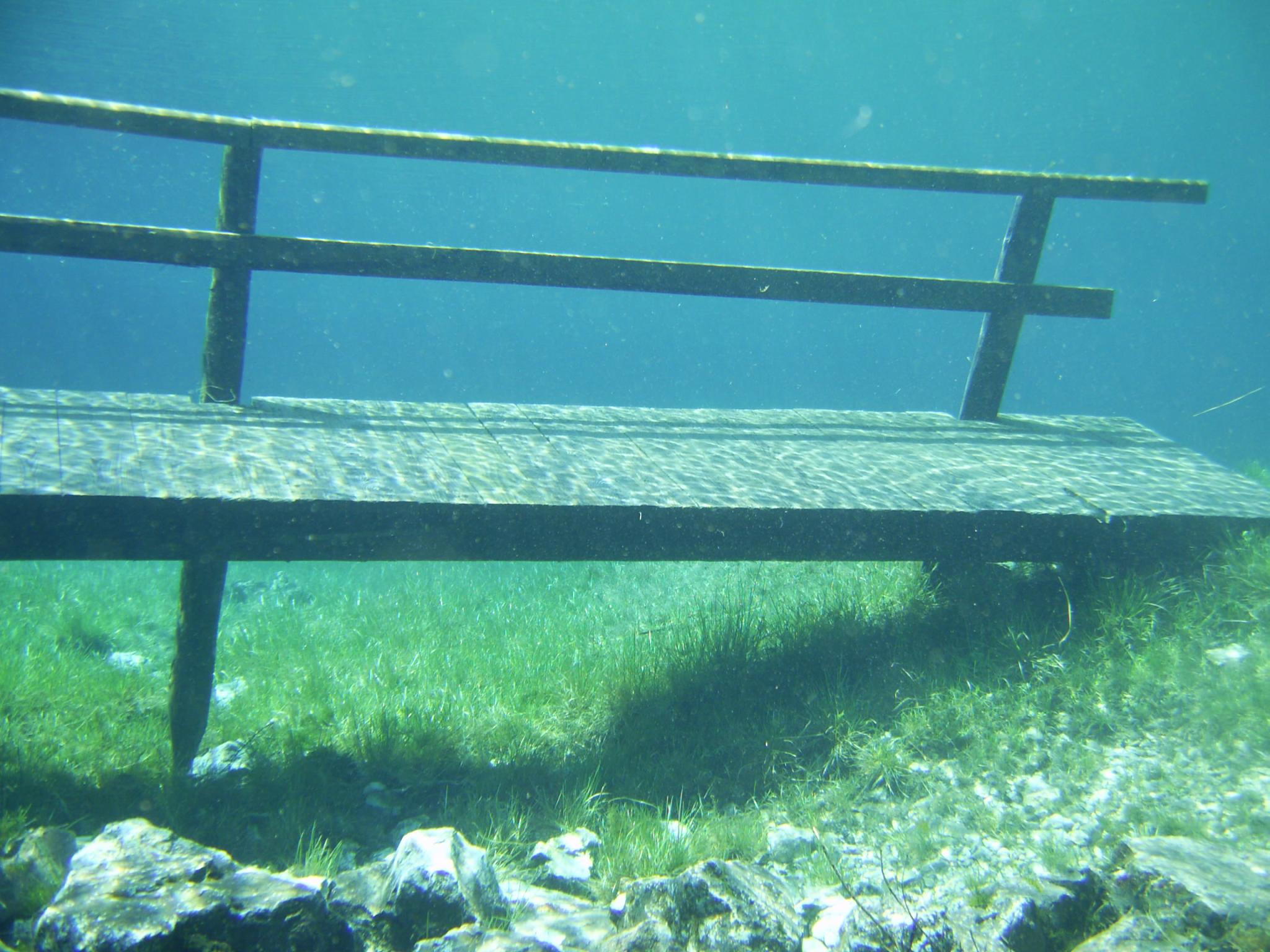

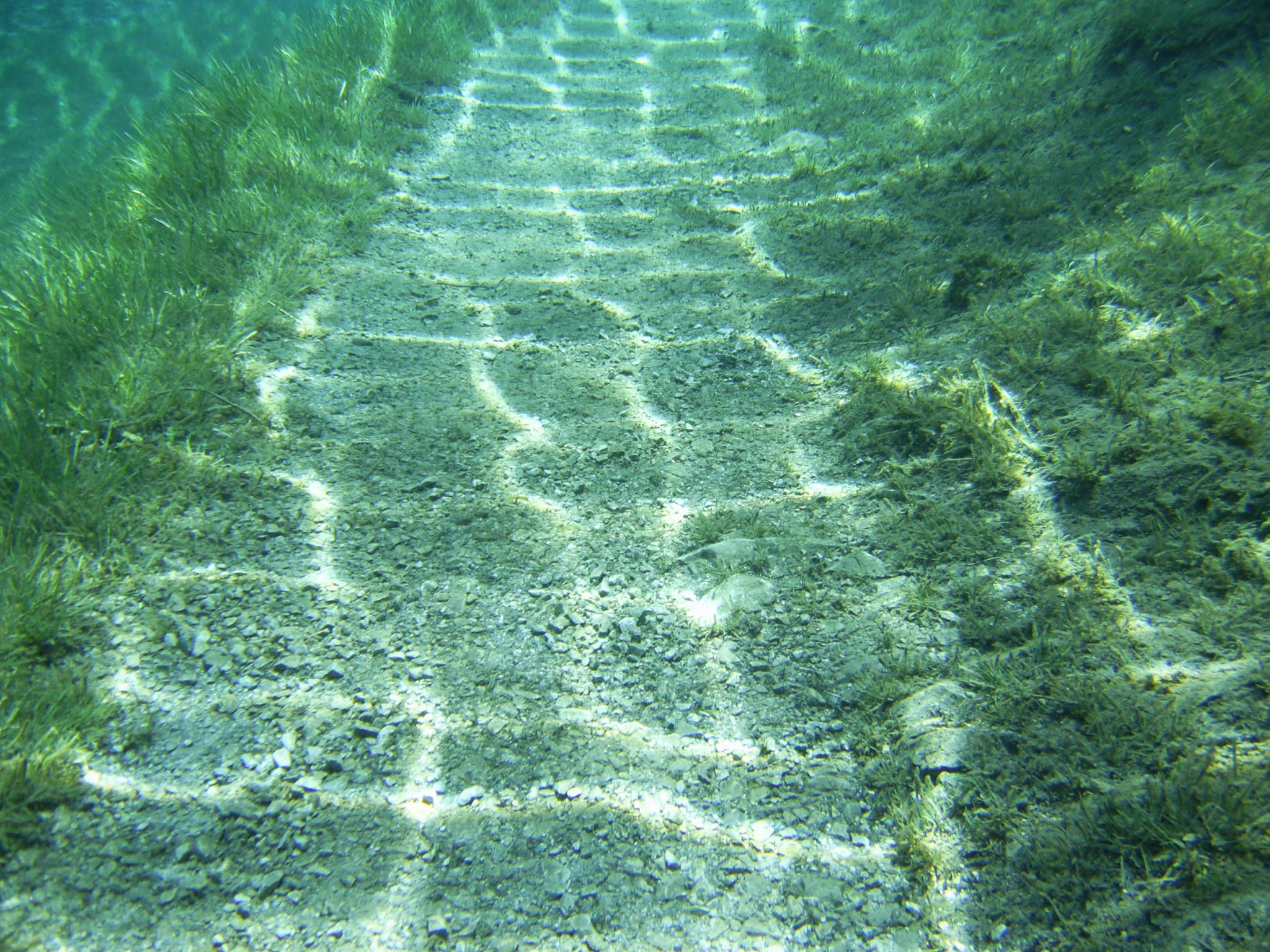

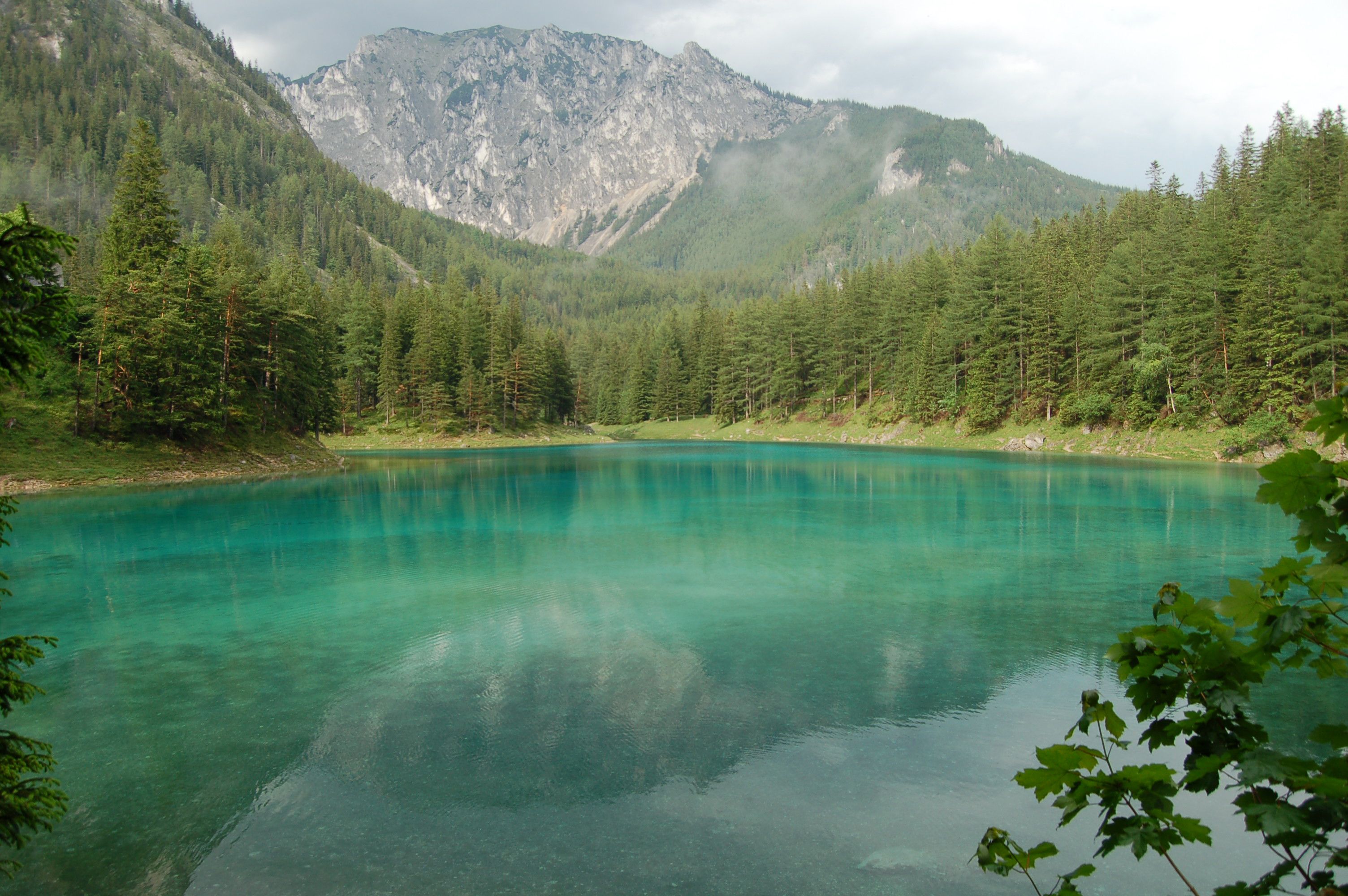
