= Hochschwab Mountains =

Mountain range in the Northern Limestone Alps of Austria

Hochschwab
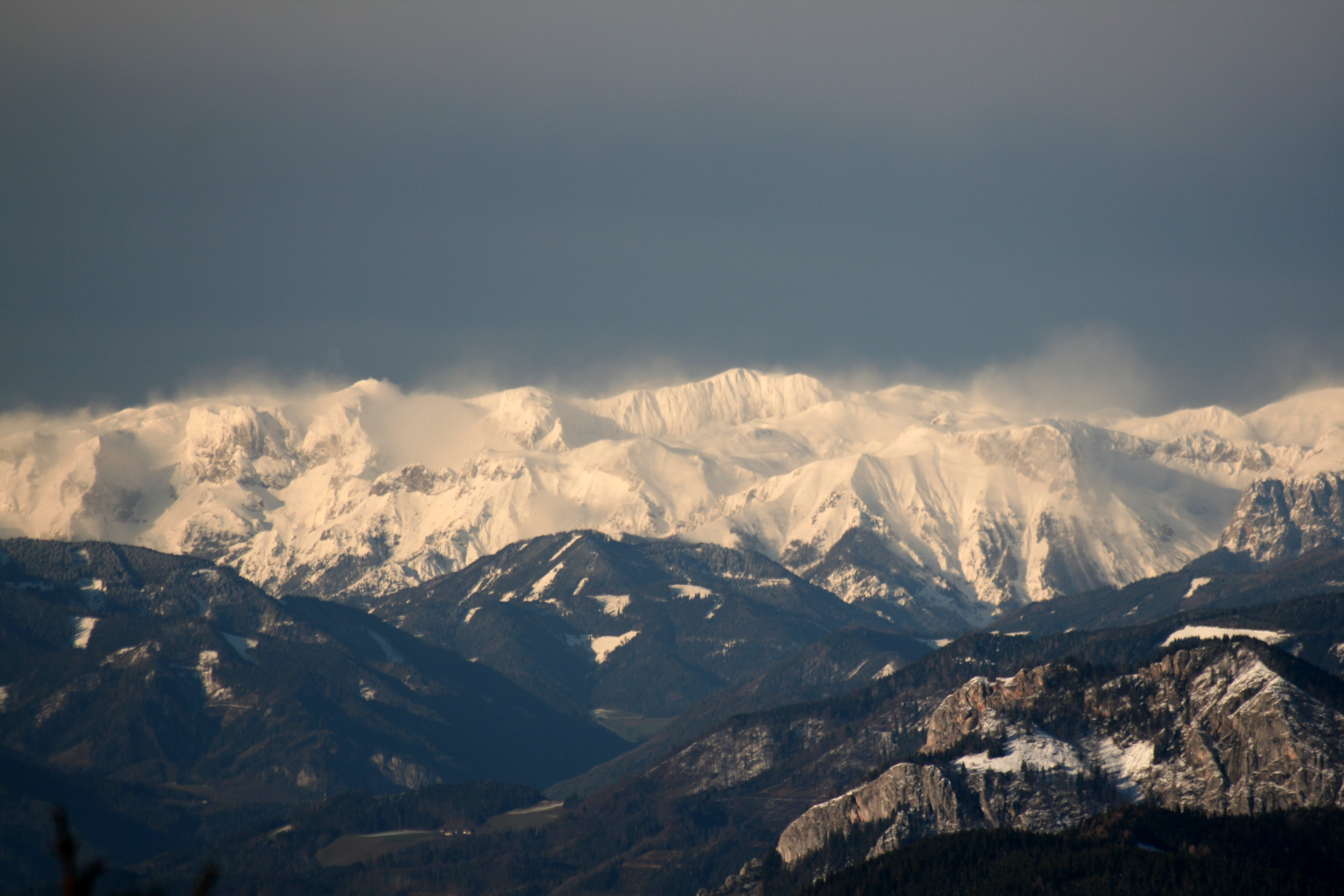
- The Hochschwab range from the Schöckl

Highest point
- Peak: Hochschwab
- Elevation: 2,277 m above sea level (AA)

Dimensions
- Length: 40 km (25 mi)

Geography
- Location within Austria
- State(s): Styria, Austria
- Range coordinates: 47°37′05″N 15°08′36″E
- Parent range: Northern Limestone Alps

The Hochschwab, Hochschwab Mountains, Hochschwab Alps or Hochschwab Group (German: Hochschwabgruppe) is a mountain range in the Northern Limestone Alps of Austria. The range is in Styria. The highest peak is also called Hochschwab and is 2,277 metres above the Adriatic.

== Location ==
The mountain range is located in the eastern part of the Northern Alps in the Austrian state of Styria.

According to the Alpine Club classification of the Eastern Alps (AVE) the range is bounded as follows:

Großreifling – Salza – Gußwerk – Wegscheid – Seeberg Saddle – Seegraben – Stübmingbach – Thörlbach to its confluence with the Mürz – Mürz to its confluence with the Mur – Mur to Leoben – Vordernberger Bach – Präbichl – Erzbach – Hieflau – Enns to Großreifling

It includes:

- the Hochschwab massif (the Hochschwab group in its specific sense): The extensive limestone plateau covers an area of about 400 km² and is bounded in the east by the Seeberg Saddle and in the west by the Präbichl. Only this massif belongs to the high limestone peaks of the Northern Limestone Alps.
  - the Aflenzer Staritzen (may also be viewed as the eastern foothills of the Hochschwab bergstock)
  - the Zeller Staritzen, in the far northeast
  - Polster, Hochturm, Pribitz and Meßnerin – these are the southern prealps (Vorstöcke) of the Hochschwab east of Präbichl
  - the northern perimeter mountains of the Aflenz Basin, less clearly distinguished from the Hochschwab Group to the north, but with more of a lower mountain character: Ilgner Alpl, Aflenzer Bürgeralm, Oisching/Schießlingalm
- part of the greywacke zone:
  - the mountains between Pichl-Großdorf and Etmißl
  - the two groups around Kletschachkogel and Thalerkogel between the valleys of Vordernbergertal and Lamingtal
  - the group of the Floning from the Lamingtal valley by the lower Thörlbach stream

Typically, only the limestone alpine region is referred to as the Hochschwab Group. The area classified systematically by the Alpine Clubs as the southern parts (along the significant orographic line of the valley), which have a completely different appearance, are known hereabouts as the Mürzsteg Alps or Mürz Hills (Mürzberge).

== Alpine huts ==
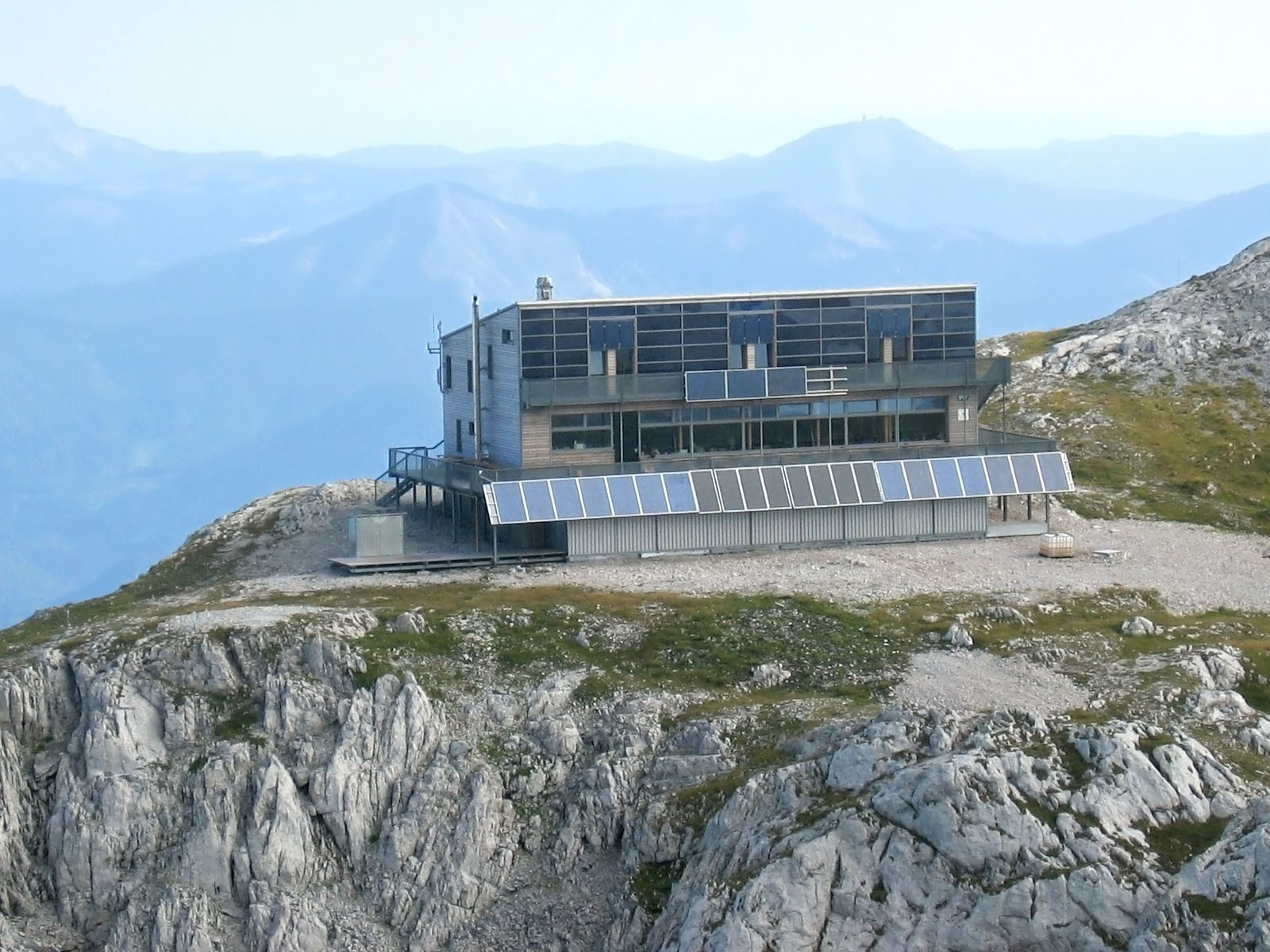
The Schiestlhaus was the first passive house constructed in a high alpine setting.

- Voisthaler Hut (ÖAV, 1,654 m) - at the foot of the Edelspitzen
- Sonnschien Hut (ÖAV, 1,523 m)
- Leobner Hut (ÖAV, 1,582 m) - to the southwest of the mountain range, reachable from the Präbichl pass. Currently closed.
- Schiestlhaus (ÖTK, 2,154 m) - northeast of the Hochschwab peak
- Fölzalm (1,484 m)
- Häuslalm (1,526 m)
- Gsollalm (1,201 m)
- Pfaffingalm (1,550 m)

== Significant peaks ==
- Hochschwab (2,277 m)
- Ringkamp (2,153 m)
- Ebenstein (2,123 m)
- Trenchtling (Hochturm) (2,081 m)
- Großer Griesstein (2,023 m)
- Beilstein (2,012 m)
- Hohe Weichsel (Aflenzer Staritzen) (2,006 m)
- Brandstein (2,003 m)
- Riegerin (1,939 m)
- Pfaffenstein (1,871 m)
- Meßnerin (1,835 m)
- Hochblaser (1,771 m)
- Thalerkogel (1,655 m)
- Floning (1,583 m)
- Pribitz (1,579 m)
- Kampeck (1,525 m)
- Kletschachkogel (1,457 m)

== Literature ==
- Günter und Luise Auferbauer: Hochschwab. Rother Wanderführer, ISBN 3-7633-4189-7
- Liselotte Buchenauer: Hochschwab, 1960 (2nd edn., 1974), Leykam Verlag ISBN 3-7011-7044-4
- Rudolf Ägyd Lindner: Hochschwab. H. Weishaupt Verlag ISBN 3-900310-26-2
- Ewald Putz: Hochschwab. ISBN 3-85498-325-5
- Lukas Plan (2002). "Speläologisch-tektonische Charakterisierung der Karstwasserdynamik im Einzugsgebiet der bedeutendsten Quelle der Ostalpen (Kläfferquelle, Hochschwab) - thesis for the Institute of Geology at the University of Vienna" (PDF). Verband Österreichischer Höhlenforscher. pp. 9–15. Archived from the original (pdf; 3.2 MB) on 2009-10-13.
