= Thörl =

- Municipality
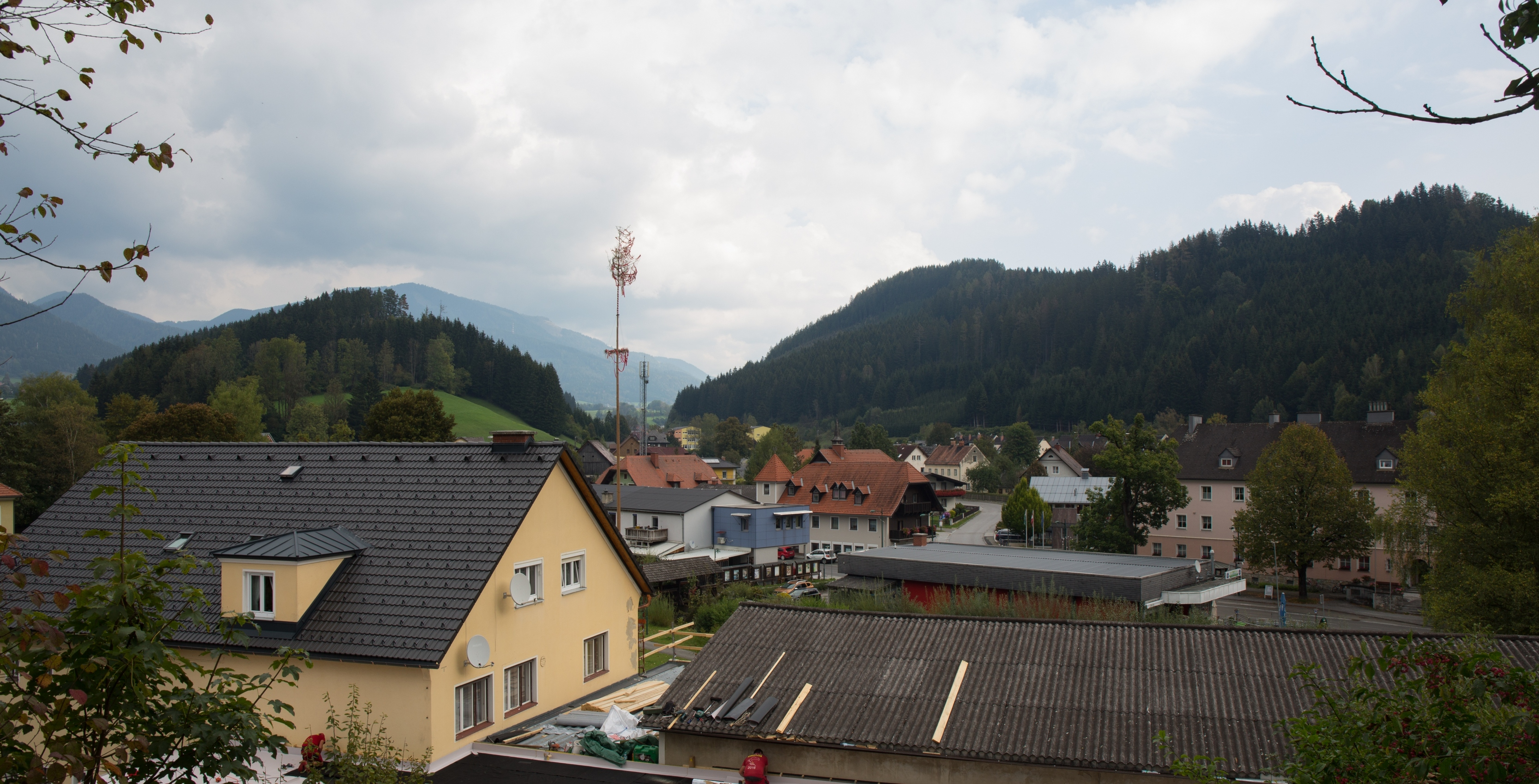

- Coat of arms

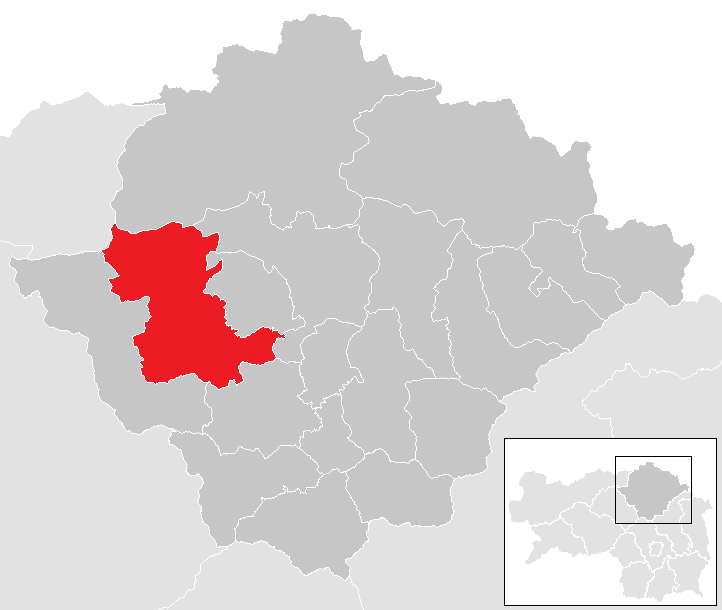
- Location within Bruck-Mürzzuschlag district

- Location within Austria
- Coordinates: 47°31′01″N 15°13′09″E
- Country: Austria
- State: Styria
- District: Bruck-Mürzzuschlag

Government
  - Mayor: Günther Wagner (SPÖ)

Area
  - Total: 166.43 km^{2} (64.26 sq mi)
- Elevation: 638 m (2,093 ft)

Population (2018-01-01)
  - Total: 2,295
  - Density: 13.79/km^{2} (35.71/sq mi)
- Time zone: UTC+1 (CET)
  - Summer (DST): UTC+2 (CEST)
- Postal code: 8621
- Area code: +43 3861
- Vehicle registration: BM
- Website: www.thoerl.gv.at

Thörl is a market town at the foot of the Hochschwab in the Styrian district of Bruck-Mürzzuschlag.

== Geography ==
=== Boroughs ===
Thörl has eight boroughs: Etmißl, Fölz, Hinterberg, Lonschitz, Oisching, Palbersdorf, St. Ilgen, and Thörl.

=== Neighboring Communes ===
- in the north: Mariazell
- in the east: Turnau and Aflenz
- in the south: Kapfenberg
- in the southwest and west: Tragöß-Sankt Katharein
- in the northwest: Wildalpen

== History ==
As of 1 January 2015 the formerly independent municipalities Sankt Ilgen and Etmißl were incorporated into Thörl. Already in 1955 the municipality Fölz bei Thörl had become part of the municipality.

== Politics ==
Thörl's mayor is Günther Wagner of the SPÖ. In its municipal council (15 seats) the party seats are distributed as follows: 9 SPÖ, 4 ÖVP, 2 FPÖ.

== Twin towns and sister cities ==
Thörl is twinned with:

- Ljubečna, Slovenia

== Traffic ==
=== Streets ===
The Mariazeller Straße is the most important road link between Kapfenberg and Mariazell, the most popular pilgrimage site in Austria. In its further course it leads to Sankt Pölten, the capital of the neighbouring state of Lower Austria.

=== Railway (History) ===
In 1893, the Thörlerbahn, a narrow gauge railway with a track gauge of 760 mm, which linked the area with Kapfenberg and the Austrian Southern Railway (Südbahn), was opened. In particular, the local iron industry benefited from this. A connection to the Austrian Western Railway was planned, but never realized.

In 1959, the passenger traffic was terminated. However, in 1991, the Verein Thörlerbahn (Thörlerbahn Association) took out a trial run with a nostalgic train. But when a bank failure bankrupted the local iron industry, the operator of the railway, Steiermärkische Landesbahnen (Styrian Railways), lost their largest (and actually the only) freight customer. As a consequence of that, they had to close the track.

In 2003 and 2004, the train tracks were removed and replaced by a cycle track.
