= Walter Mittelholzer =

Swiss aviation pioneer (1894–1937)

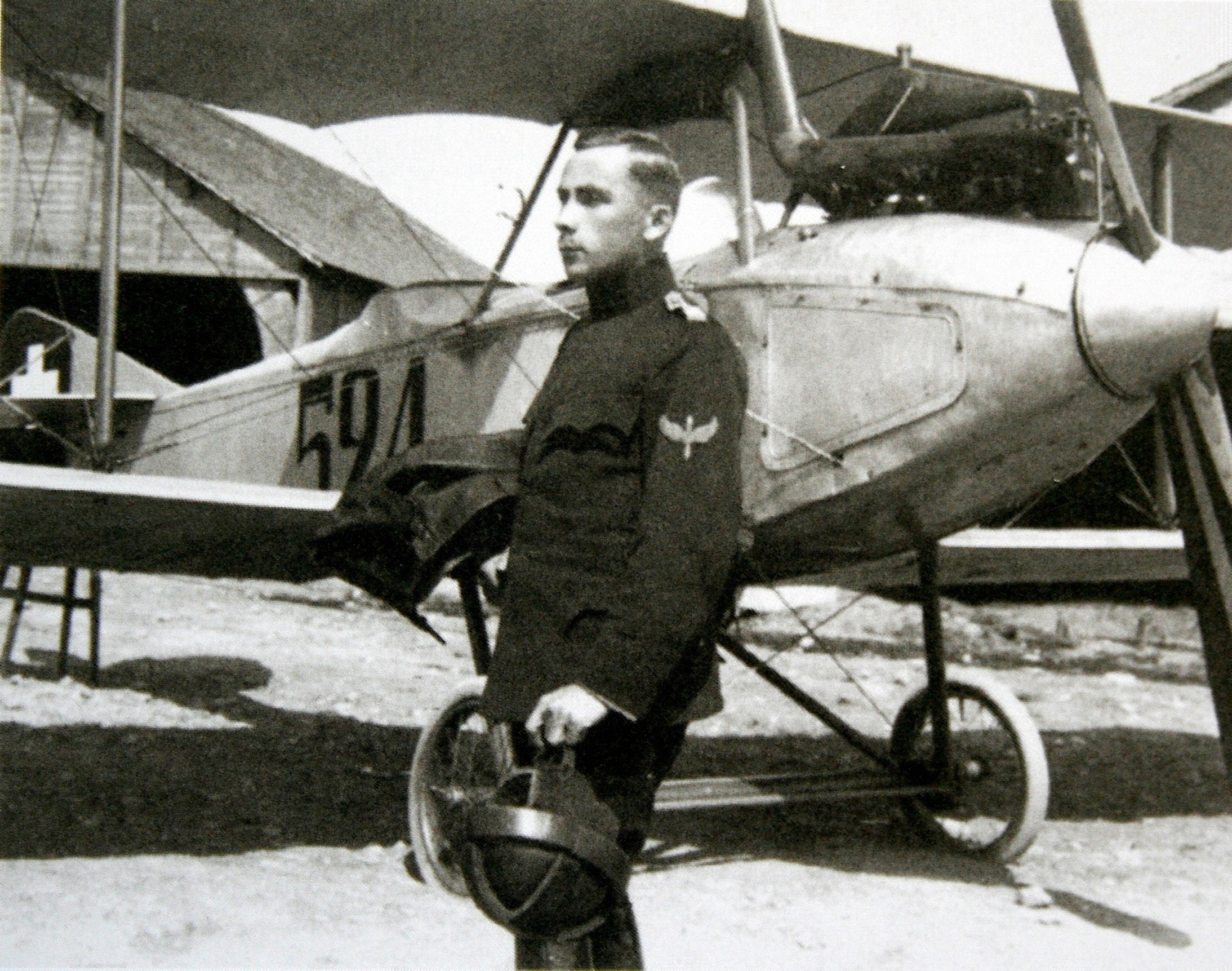
- Walter Mittelholzer (c. 1918)
- Born: Walter Mittelholzer; 2 April 1894; St. Gallen, Switzerland
- Died: 9 May 1937 (aged 43); Hochschwab, Styria, Austria

Walter Mittelholzer (2 April 1894 – 9 May 1937) was a Swiss aviation pioneer and one of the first aviation entrepreneurs. He was active as a pilot, photographer, and travel writer.

== Life ==
Mittelholzer was born on 2 April 1894 in St. Gallen, the son of a baker, earned his private pilot's license in 1917. In 1918 he completed his instruction as a military pilot.

On 5 November 1919 he co-founded an air-photo and passenger flight business, Comte, Mittelholzer, and Co. In 1920 this firm merged with the financially stronger Ad Astra Aero. Mittelholzer was the director and head pilot of Ad Astra Aero, which later became Swissair.

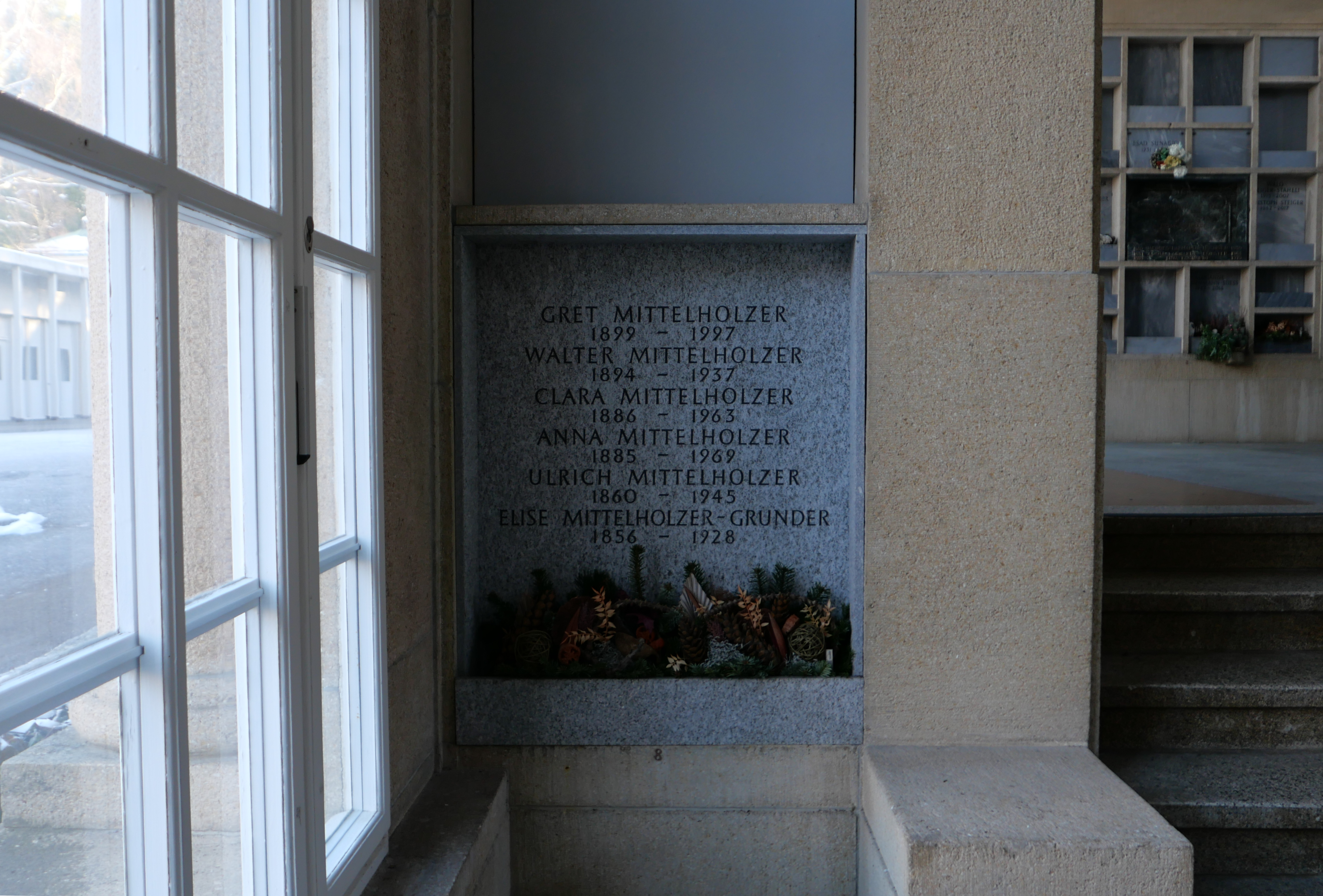
The grave in 2025.

He made the first north–south flight across Africa. It took him 77 days. Mittelholzer started in Zürich on 7 December 1926, flying via Alexandria and landing in Cape Town on 21 February 1927. Earlier, he had been the first to do serious aerial reconnaissance of Spitsbergen, in a Junkers monoplane, in 1923. On 8 January 1930 he became the first person to fly over Mount Kilimanjaro; he planned to fly over Mount Everest later in 1930. In 1931, Mittelholzer was appointed technical director of the new airline called Swissair, formed from the merger of Ad Astra Aero and Balair. Throughout his life he published many books of aerial photographs and marketed his expeditions through films and the media as well.

He died in 1937 in a climbing accident on an expedition in the Hochschwab massif in southwest face of Stangenwand in Styria, Austria. His mortal remains were cremated and buried in the urn vault of his mother Elizabeth "Elise", née Grunder (1856-1928), in the columbarium halls of the Feldli cemetery in St. Gallen. The urns containing the ashes of his father Walter Ulrich (1860-1945), a baker, and those of three of his four sisters - Anna (1885-1969), Clara (1886-1963) and Gret (1899-1997) - were later buried there as well.

Among other Swiss air pioneers, he is commemorated in a Swiss postage stamp issued in January 1977. His legacy of some 18,500 photographs is kept at ETH Library's image archive in Zürich, Switzerland.

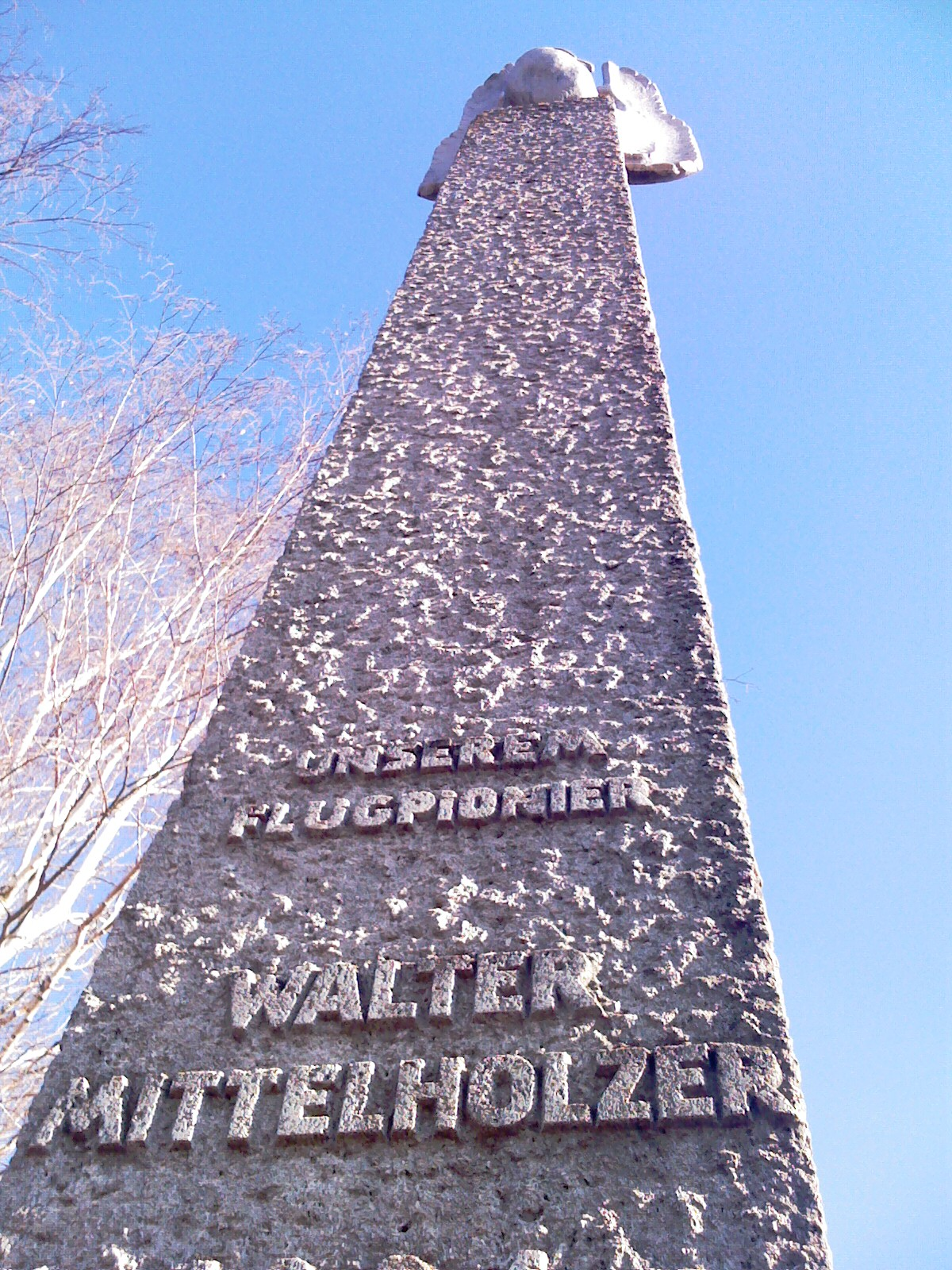
Mittelholzer memorial at Zürich Airport

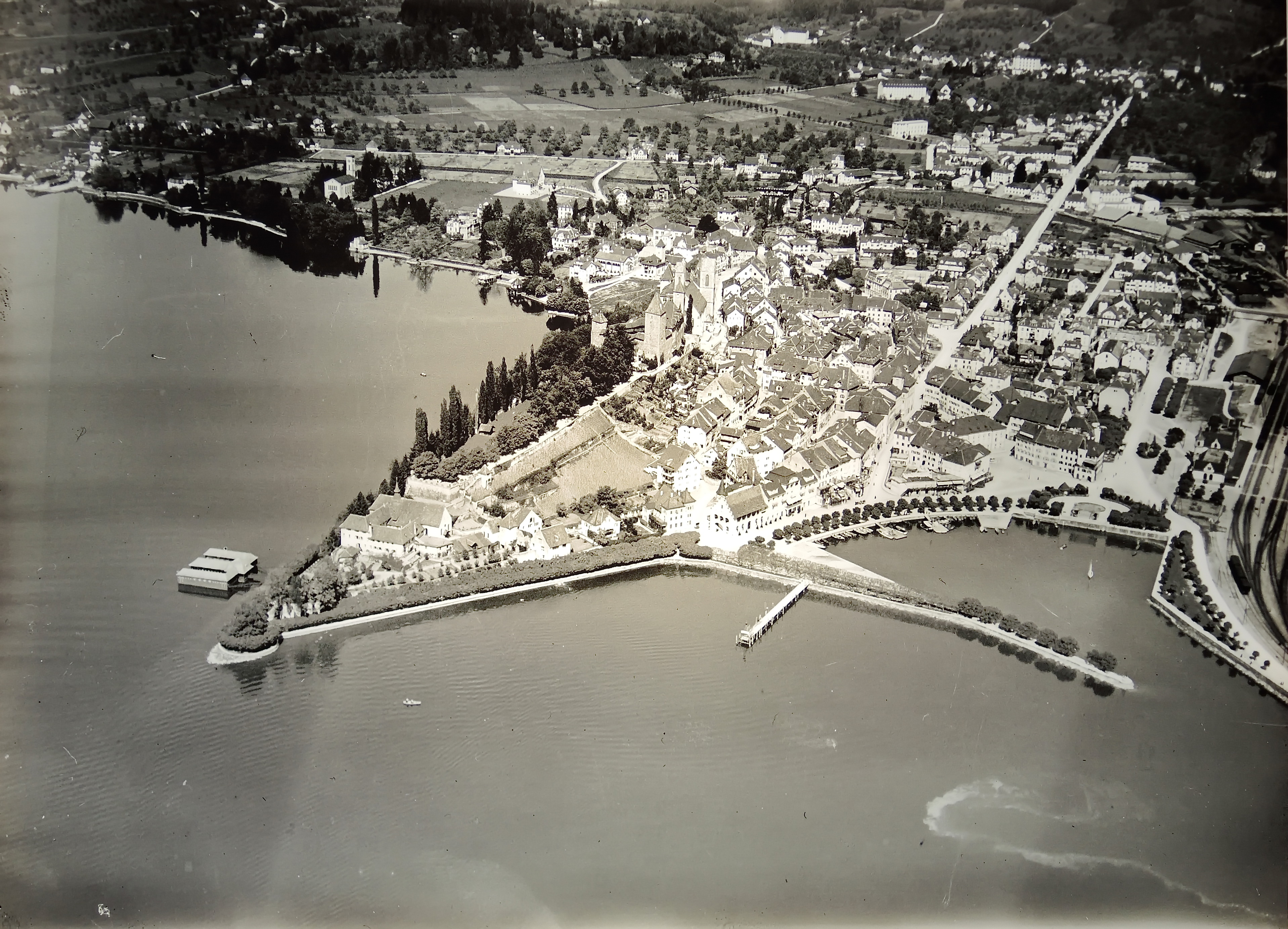
Earliest aerial photography of Rapperswil, Switzerland, by Walter Mittelholzer in 1919

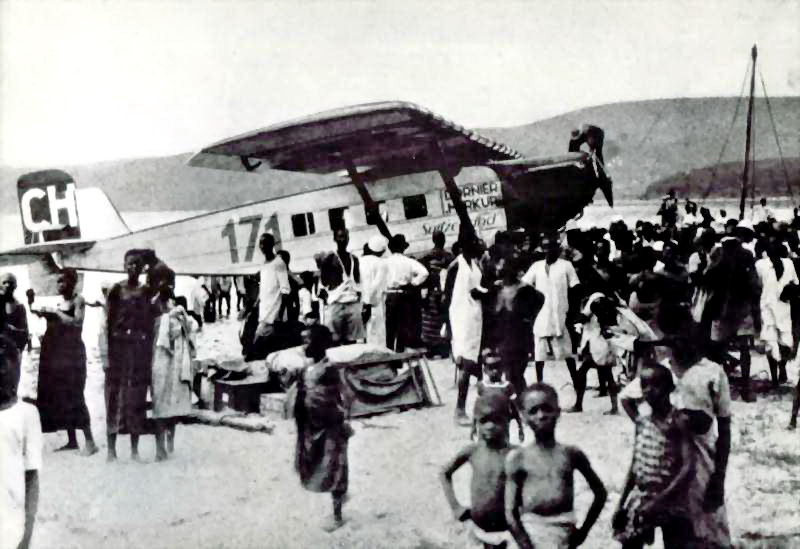
Ad Astra Aero Dornier Merkur (CH-171) piloted by Mittelholzer in Kigocna, Kenya (1927)

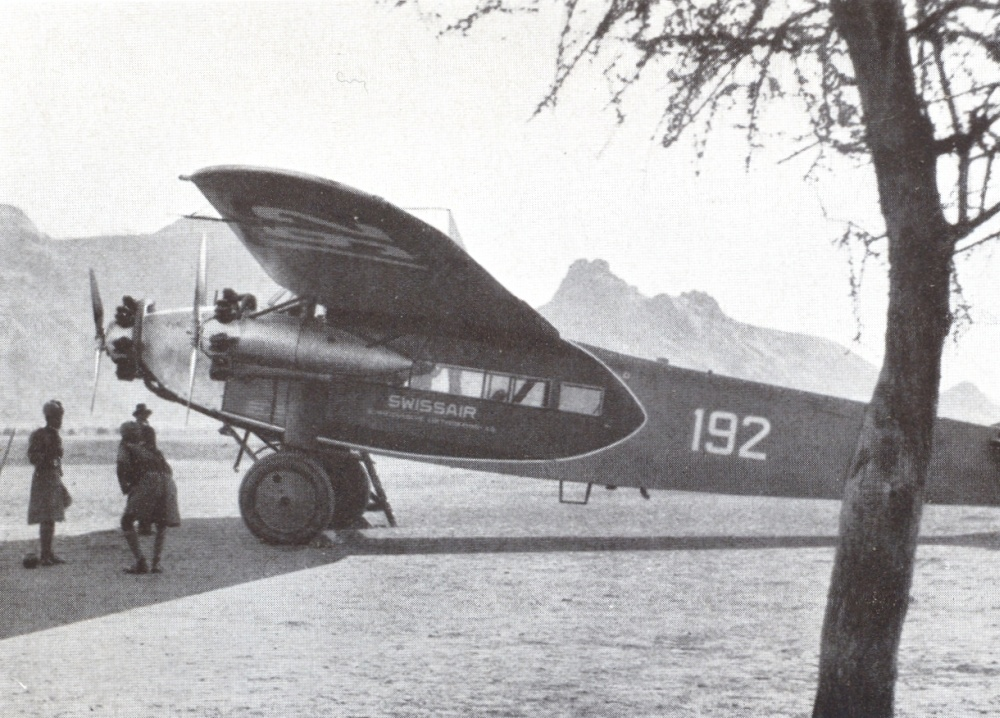
Swissair Fokker F.VIIb-3 m (CH-192) piloted by Walter Mittelholzer in Kassala, Sudan, February 1934

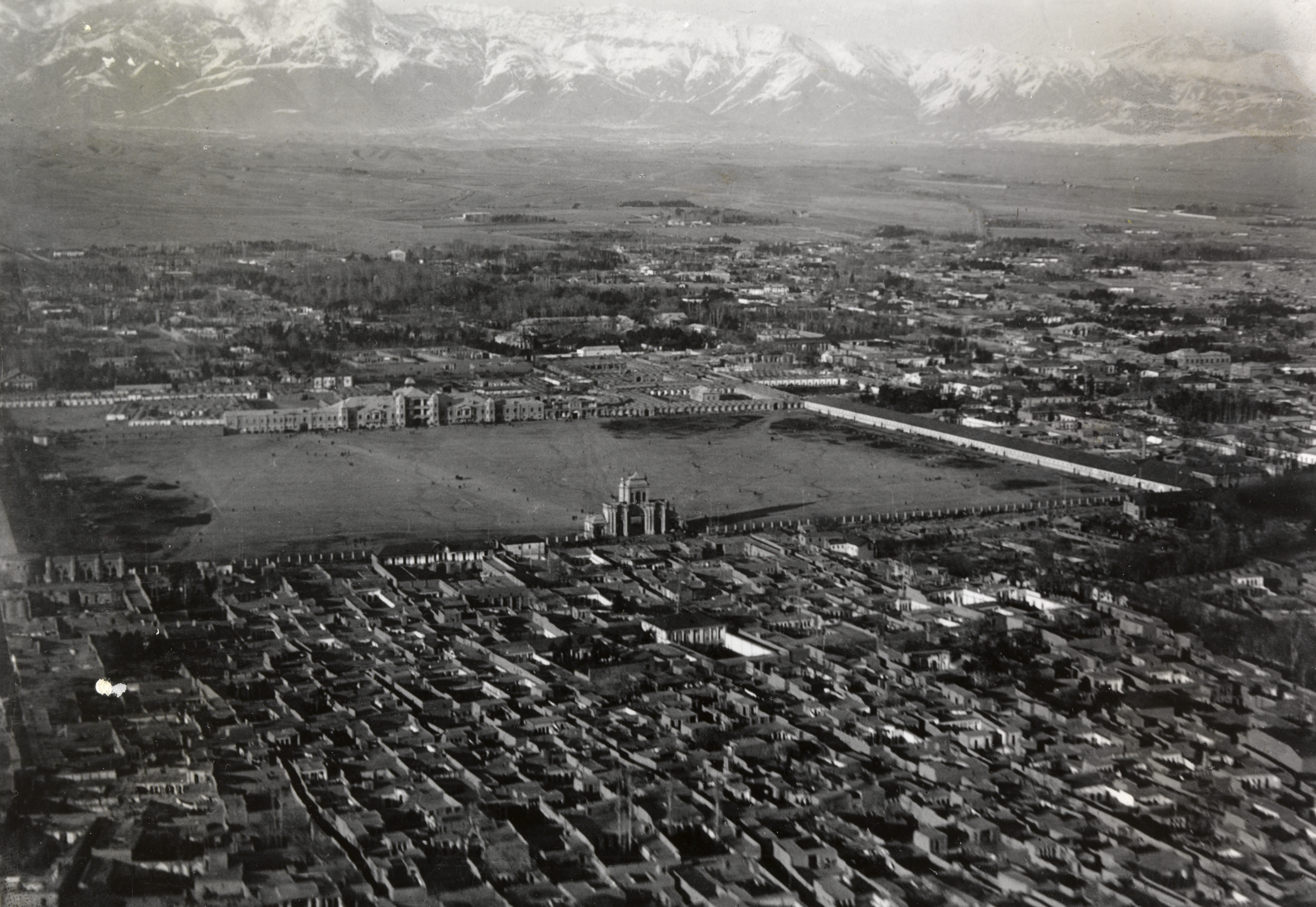
Aerial view of Tehran in 1925 by Walter Mittelholzer

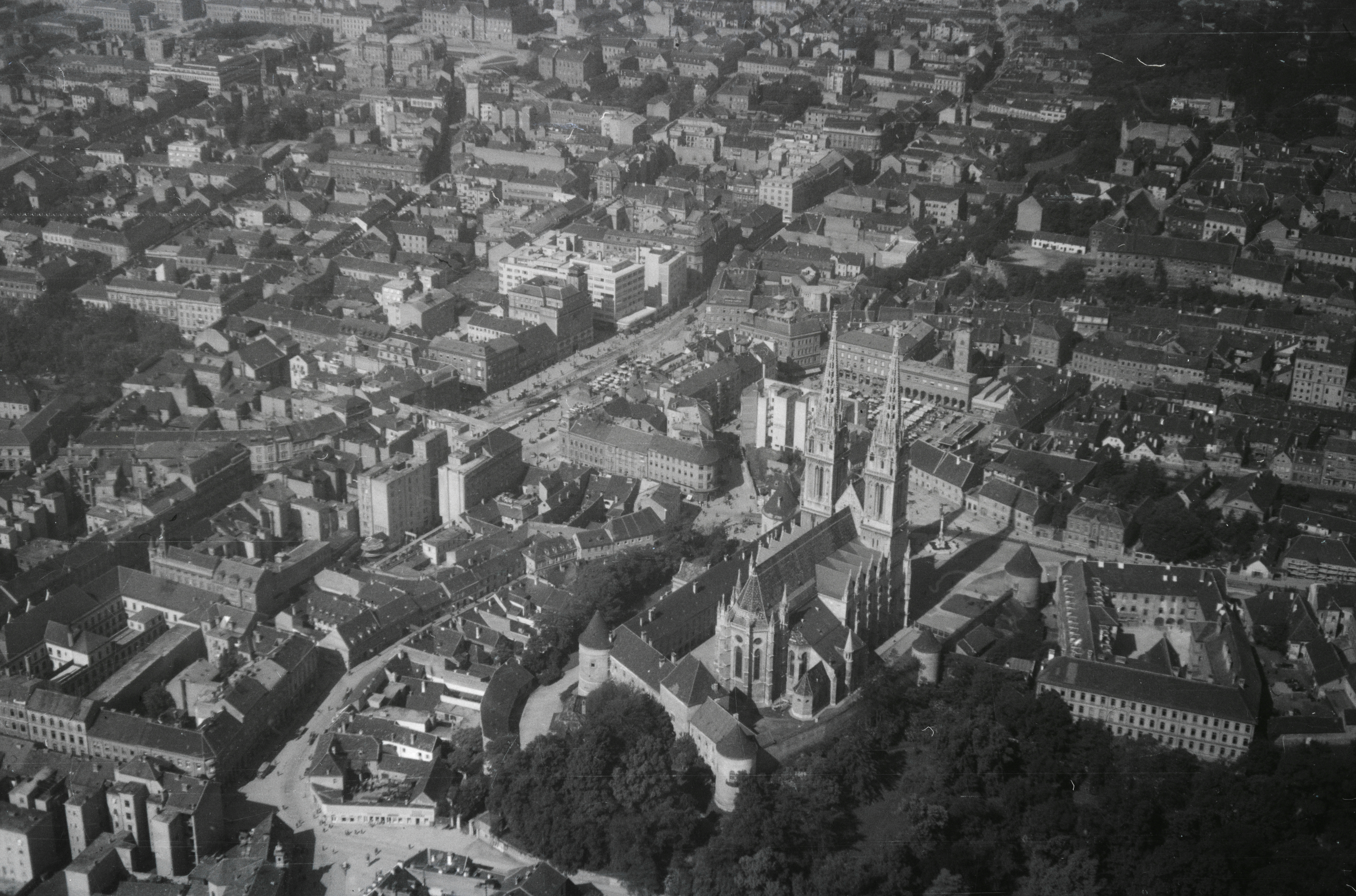
Aerial view of Zagreb, between 1932 and 1936

== Select bibliography ==
- Im Flugzeug dem Nordpol entgegen: Junkers'sche Hilfsexpedition für Amundsen nach Spitzbergen, 1923 (with Kurt Wegener, Adolf Miethe, Hans Boykow). Orell Füssli, 1924.
- Die Schweiz aus der Vogelschau: 274 Abbildungen aus der Sammlung von Walter Mittelholzer (with Otto Flückiger. Eugen Rentsch, 1926.
- Persienflug (with Otto Flückiger). Orell Füssli, 1926.
- Kilimandjaro Flug. Orell Füssli, 1930.
- Alpenflug (with F. Hass, Hans Kempf, Willi Fritz Burger). Orell Füssli, 1930.
- Mittelmeerflug, mit 120 Fliegeraufnahmen und einer Einleitung (with Gustav Ehrhardt). Rascher & cie, 1930.
- Tschadseeflug: Mit dem drei-motorigen Fokker der Swissair durch die Sahara zum Tschadsee (with Auguste Piccard). Schweizer aero-revue, 1932.
- Abessinienflug: Mit dem dreimotorigen Fokker an den Hof des Negus Negesti. Schweizer aero-revue, 1934.
- Fliegerabenteuer (with Willi Rickmer Rickmers, Werner von Langsdorff). Brockhaus, 1938.
- Die Schweiz von damals, 1917-1937: 350 historische Flugaufnahmen (with Walter M. Borner). Weltbild-Verlag, 2005. ISBN 3-03812-104-5, ISBN 978-3-03812-104-6.
