= Sankt Katharein an der Laming =

- Former municipality
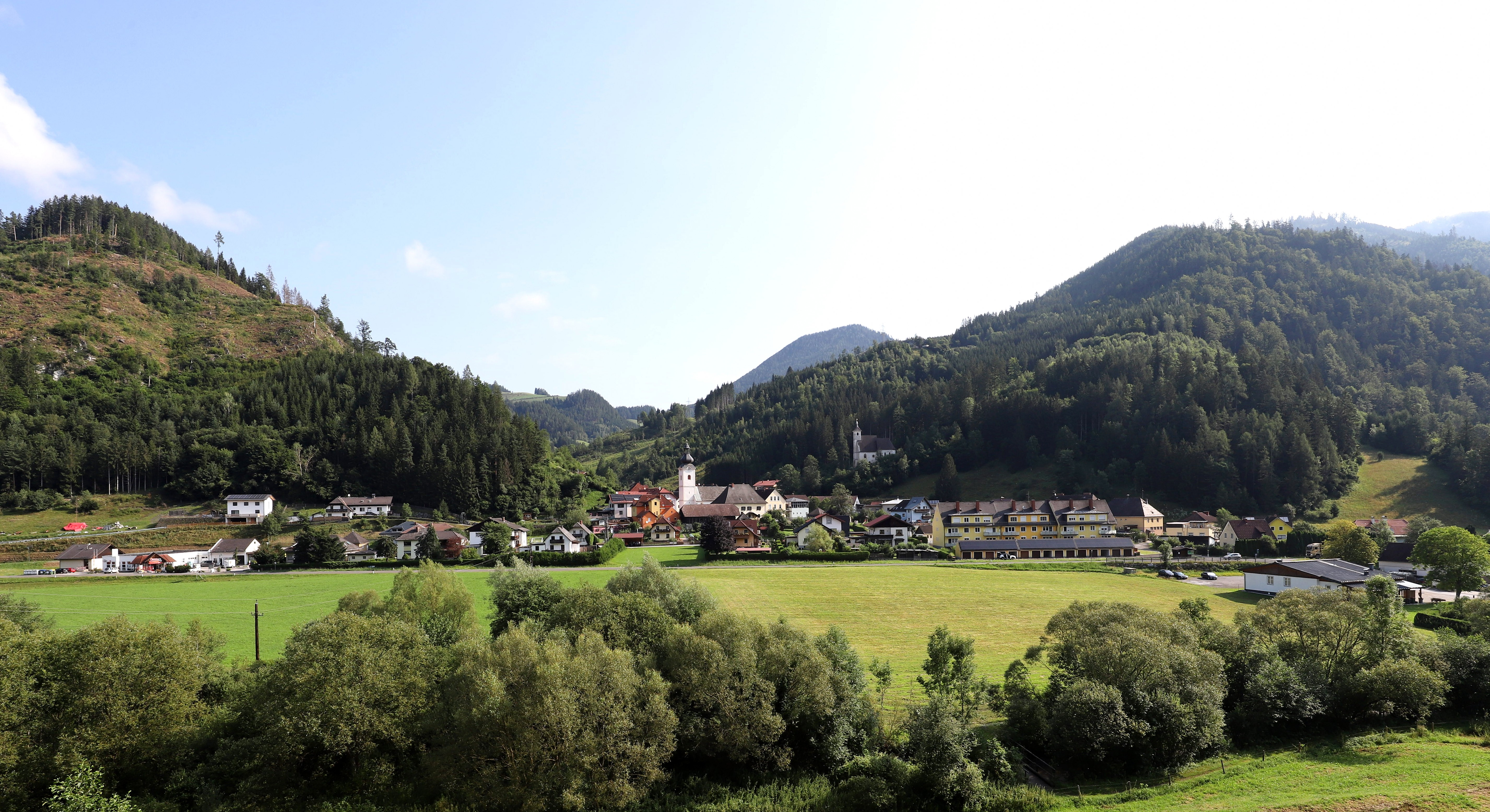

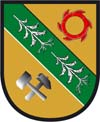
- Coat of arms

- Location within Austria
- Coordinates: 47°28′00″N 15°09′00″E
- Country: Austria
- State: Styria
- District: Bruck-Mürzzuschlag

Area
  - Total: 43.88 km^{2} (16.94 sq mi)
- Elevation: 651 m (2,136 ft)

Population (1 January 2016)
  - Total: 971
  - Density: 22.1/km^{2} (57.3/sq mi)
- Time zone: UTC+1 (CET)
  - Summer (DST): UTC+2 (CEST)
- Postal code: 8611
- Area code: 0 38 69
- Vehicle registration: BM
- Website: www.katharein.at/gemeinde

Sankt Katharein an der Laming is a former municipality in the district of Bruck-Mürzzuschlag in Styria, Austria. Since the 2015 Styria municipal structural reform, it is part of the municipality Tragöß-Sankt Katharein.
