= Tragöß =

- Former municipality
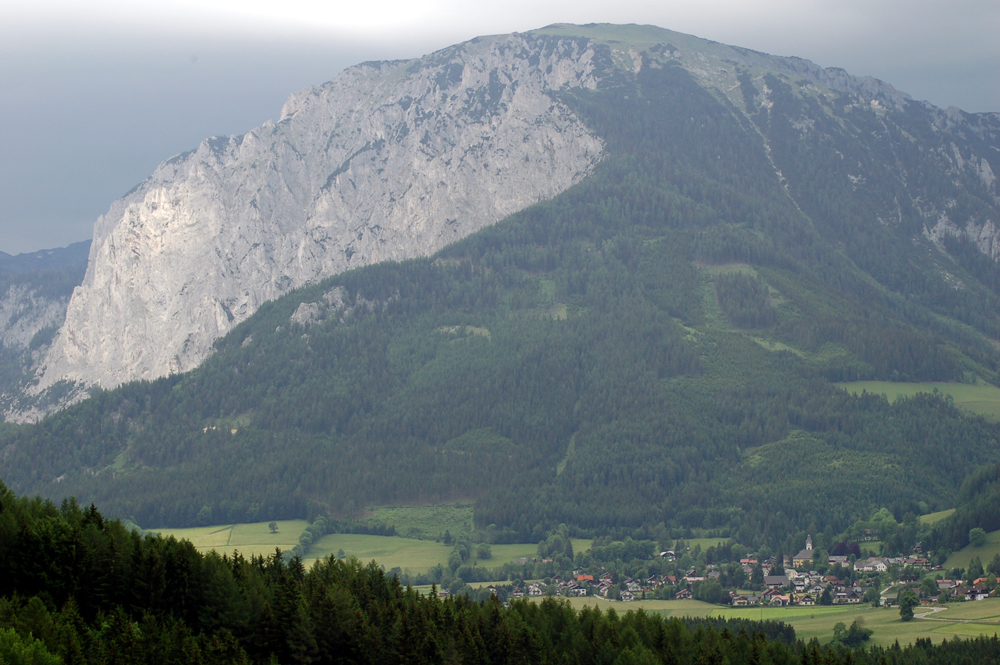

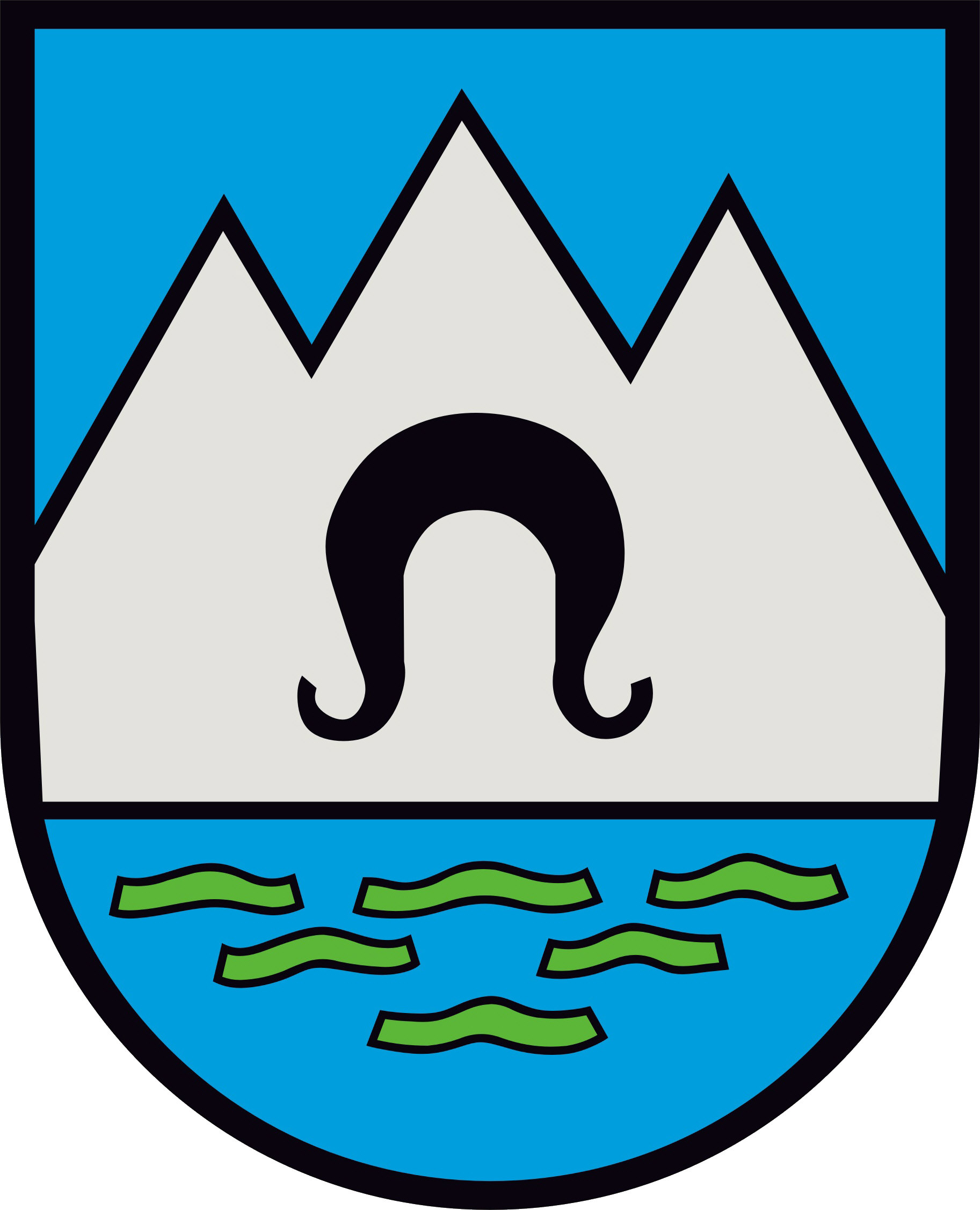
- Coat of arms

- Location within Austria
- Coordinates: 47°30′00″N 15°04′00″E
- Country: Austria
- State: Styria
- District: Bruck-Mürzzuschlag

Area
  - Total: 110.52 km^{2} (42.67 sq mi)
- Elevation: 793 m (2,602 ft)

Population (1 January 2016)
  - Total: 981
  - Density: 8.88/km^{2} (23.0/sq mi)
- Time zone: UTC+1 (CET)
  - Summer (DST): UTC+2 (CEST)
- Postal code: 8612
- Area code: 0 38 68
- Vehicle registration: BM
- Website: www.tragoess.at

Tragöß (or Tragoess) is a former municipality in the district of Bruck-Mürzzuschlag in Styria, Austria. Since the 2015 Styria municipal structural reform, it is part of the municipality Tragöß-Sankt Katharein.

It is home to Grüner See (Green Lake), which dries out almost completely in the autumn. In the spring the lake is filled with snow melt runoff. This gives the lake crystal clear water, the existing rocks and meadow give the lake its green colour.

== History ==
It is likely that Tragöß was already inhabited by the ancient Celts. The centuries that followed the collapse of the Roman Empire in western Europe, were marked by a period of large scale migrations, and by the sixth century the Tragöß area was inhabited by Slavs, who made their homes not on the valley floors, but on the slopes that overlooked them. Bavarii and Franks followed in the ninth century, settling for the most part the fertile ground of the valley floors.

The first surviving written record of the place dates from 16 May 1023, in connection with the gifting of lands by Emperor Henry II to the Convent of Göß.
