= Aflenz =

- Municipality
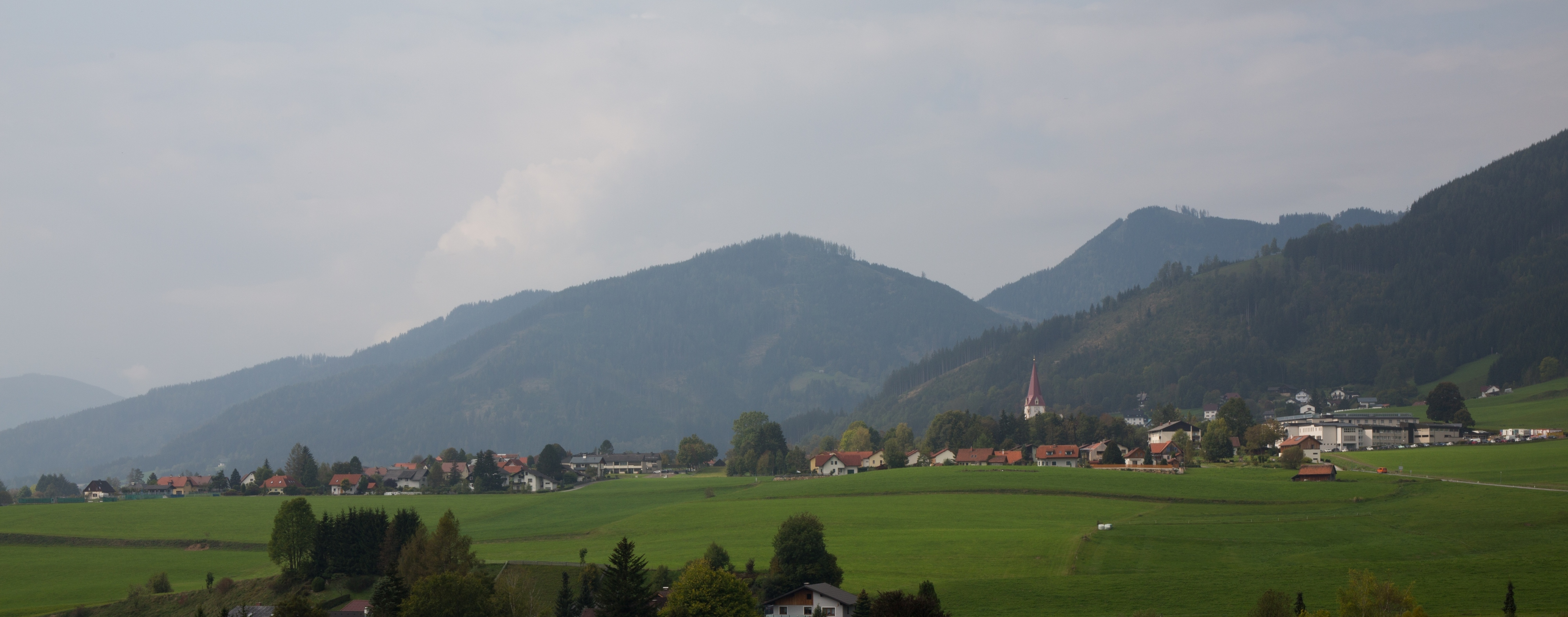
- Aflenz from southeast

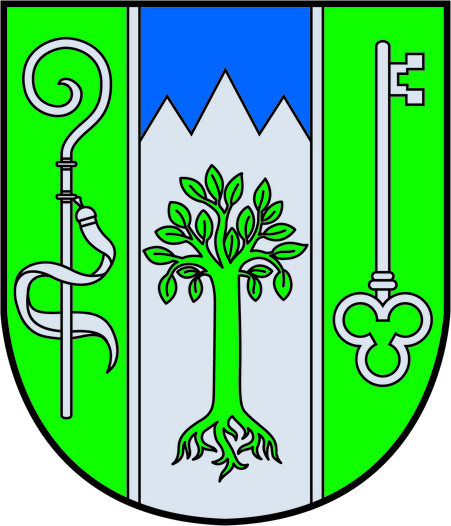
- Coat of arms

- Location within Austria
- Coordinates: 47°32′40″N 15°14′25″E
- Country: Austria
- State: Styria
- District: Bruck-Mürzzuschlag

Government
  - Mayor: Hubert Lenger (ÖVP)

Area
  - Total: 55.1 km^{2} (21.3 sq mi)
- Elevation: 765 m (2,510 ft)

Population (2018-01-01)
  - Total: 2,417
  - Density: 43.9/km^{2} (114/sq mi)
- Time zone: UTC+1 (CET)
  - Summer (DST): UTC+2 (CEST)
- Postal code: 8621, 8623, 8624
- Area code: 03861
- Website: www.aflenz.gv.at

Aflenz is since January 2015 a new market town with 2,421 residents (as of 1 January 2016) in Bruck-Mürzzuschlag District of Styria, Austria.

The municipality was founded as part of the Styria municipal structural reform, on 31 December 2014, from the dissolved independent municipalities Aflenz Kurort and Aflenz Land.

== Geography ==
=== Municipality arrangement ===
The municipal territory includes the following six sections or like-named Katastralgemeinden (populations as of 1 January 2016, area 2015):

- Aflenz Kurort (998, 1,609.45 ha or 3,977.0 acres)
- Döllach (110, 387.06 ha or 956.4 acres)
- Dörflach (201, 1,705.68 ha)
- Graßnitz (463) KG Grassnitz (895.99 ha)
- Jauring (507, 777.38 ha or 1,920.9 acres)
- Tutschach (142, 129.87 ha or 320.9 acres)

Aflenz is completely surrounded by both nearby towns.

== Coat of arms ==
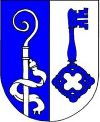
Aflenz Kurort

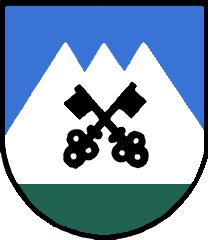
Aflenz Land

By way of the merger, the crests of Aflenz Kurort and Aflenz Land were officially retired on 1 January 2015.

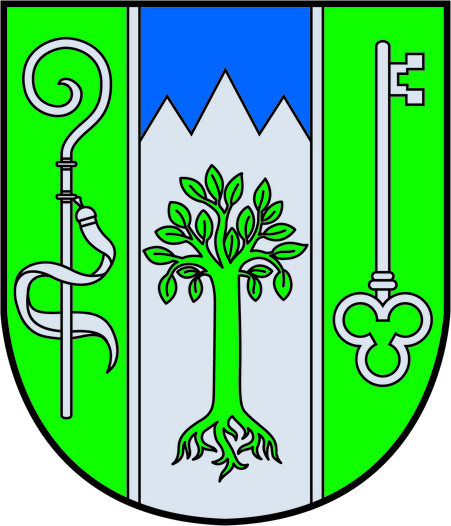

The Neuverleihung to the town Aflenz succeeded with Wirkung of 15 June 2016.
The altered blazon states:

"Between green shield flanks, the front with a silver Bishop staff together with flying ribbon, the back with a silver inverted key, a blue, silver-bordered sky, until in the center section a silver three-peaked mountain with a higher middle peak; these joined by a green leafy appletree."

== Tourism ==
The town along with Thörl has the tourism agency "Hochschwab". The base is the town Aflenz.

== Culture and sights ==
- Pfarrkirche Aflenz - parish church
