= Aflenz Land =

- Former municipality
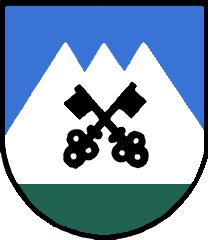
- Coat of arms

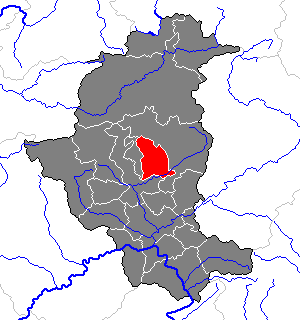
- Location within Bruck-Mürzzuschlag district

- Location within Austria
- Coordinates: 47°34′00″N 15°14′00″E
- Country: Austria
- State: Styria
- District: Bruck-Mürzzuschlag

Area
  - Total: 39 km^{2} (15 sq mi)
- Elevation: 765–1,810 m (2,510–5,938 ft)

Population (2014-01-01)
  - Total: 1,483
  - Density: 38/km^{2} (98/sq mi)
- Time zone: UTC+1 (CET)
  - Summer (DST): UTC+2 (CEST)
- Postal code: 8624
- Area code: 03861
- Vehicle registration: BM
- Website: www.aflenz-land.at

Aflenz Land was a municipality in Austria which merged in January 2015 into Aflenz in the Bruck-Mürzzuschlag District of Styria, Austria.

As of 1 January 2015, Aflenz Land has been amalgamated with Aflenz Kurort municipality into Marktgemeinde Aflenz (i.e. Aflenz Market Town).
