= Etmißl =

- Former municipality
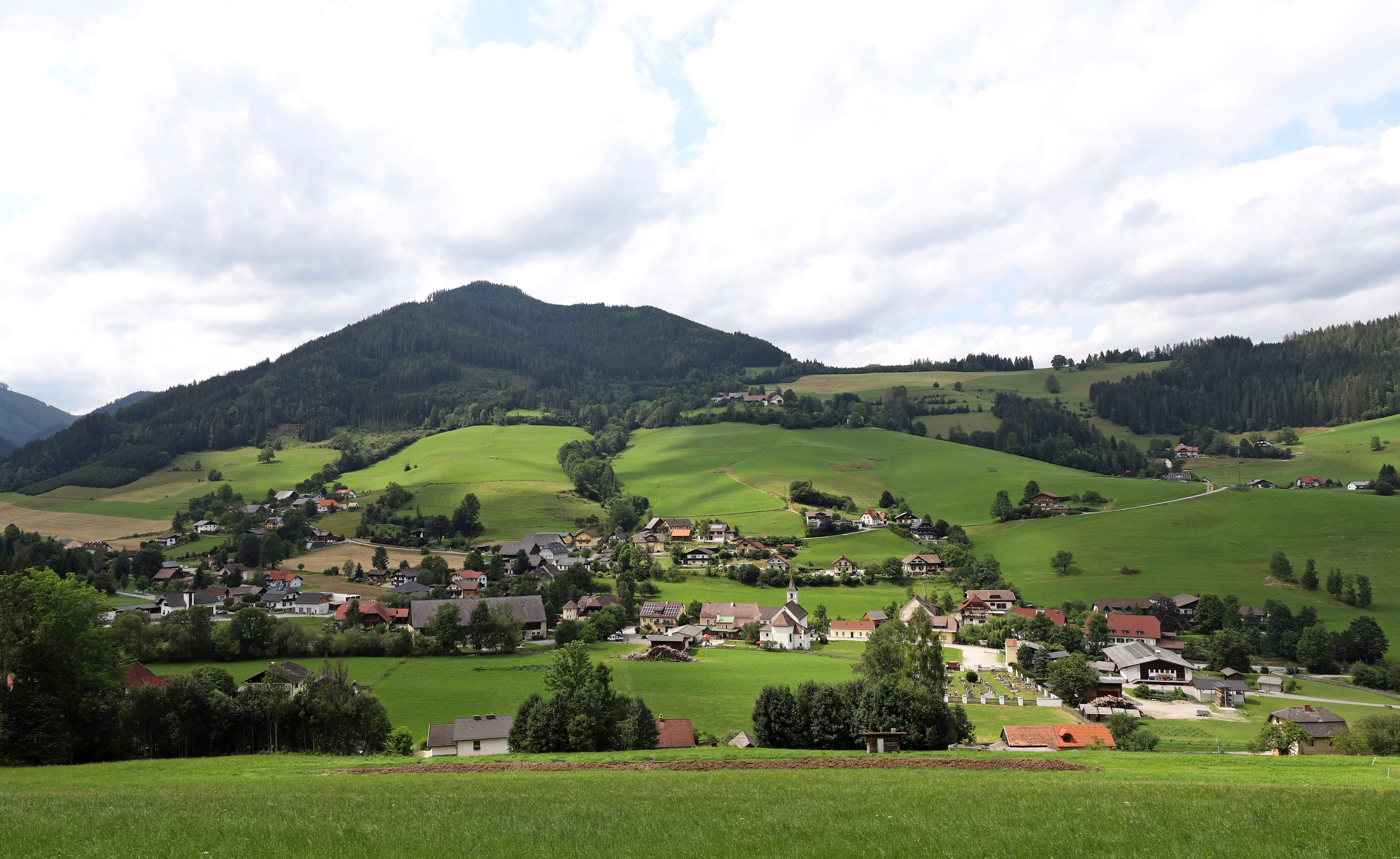

- Location within Austria
- Coordinates: 47°30′00″N 15°10′00″E
- Country: Austria
- State: Styria
- District: Bruck-Mürzzuschlag

Area
  - Total: 32.0 km^{2} (12.4 sq mi)
- Elevation: 712–1,583 m (2,336–5,194 ft)

Population (1 January 2016)
  - Total: 479
  - Density: 15.0/km^{2} (38.8/sq mi)
- Time zone: UTC+1 (CET)
  - Summer (DST): UTC+2 (CEST)
- Postal code: 8622
- Area code: 03861
- Vehicle registration: BM
- Website: www.etmissl.at

Etmißl was an Austrian municipality in the District of Bruck-Mürzzuschlag, Styria.

As of 1 January 2015 it has been incorporated into Thörl.

== Geography ==
Etmißl is located in a side valley of the Hochschwab.

Its boroughs were Etmißl, Lonschitz, and Oisching.
