= Messnerin =

Mountain in Austria

- German: Meßnerin
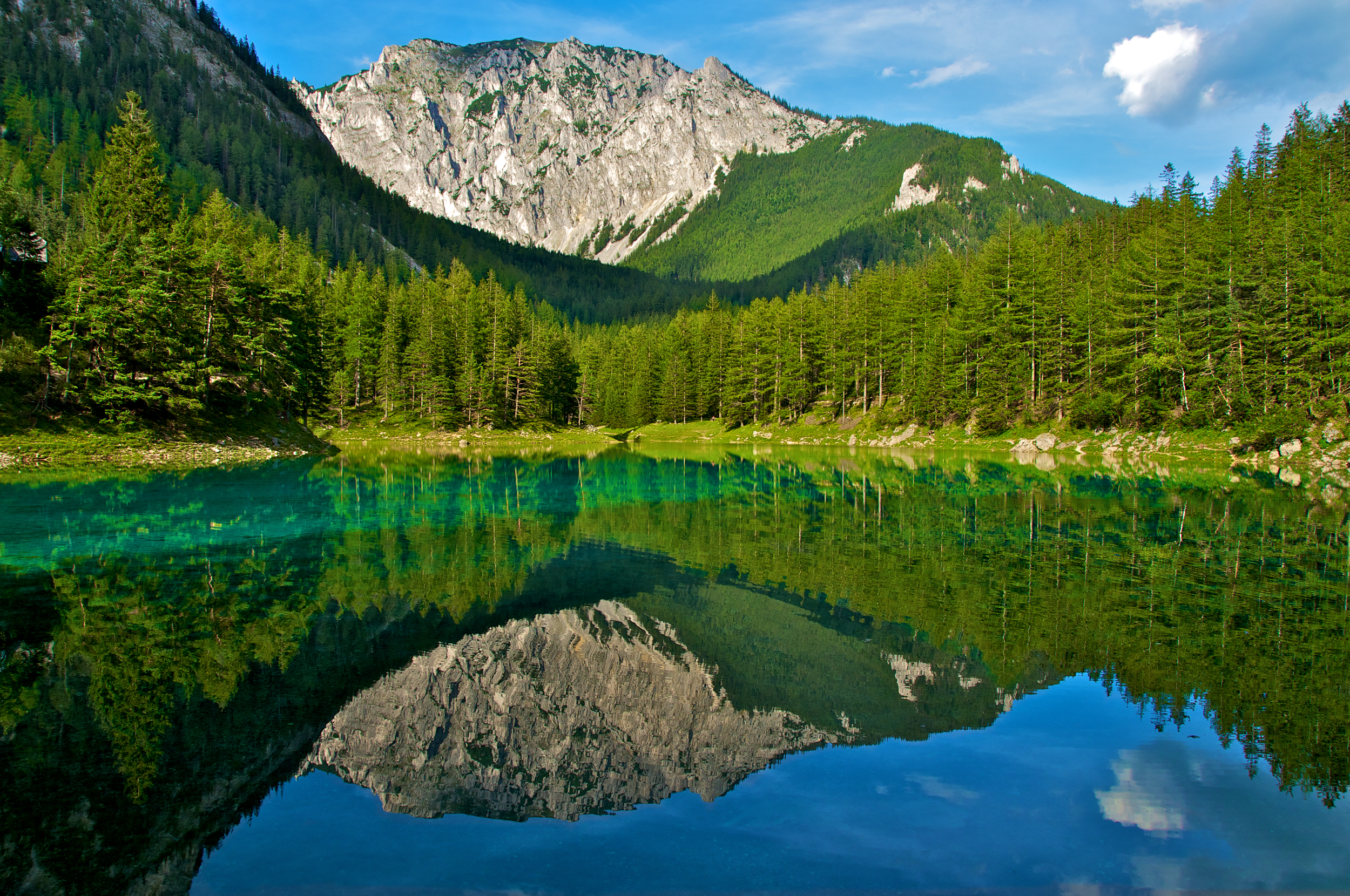
- The classic view of Messnerin from Grüner See

Highest point
- Elevation: 1,835 m (6,020 ft)
- Prominence: 616 m (2,021 ft)
- Coordinates: 47°33′0″N 15°5′0″E

Geography
- Location within Alps
- Location: Bruck an der Mur District, Styria, Austria
- Parent range: Hochschwab Mountains

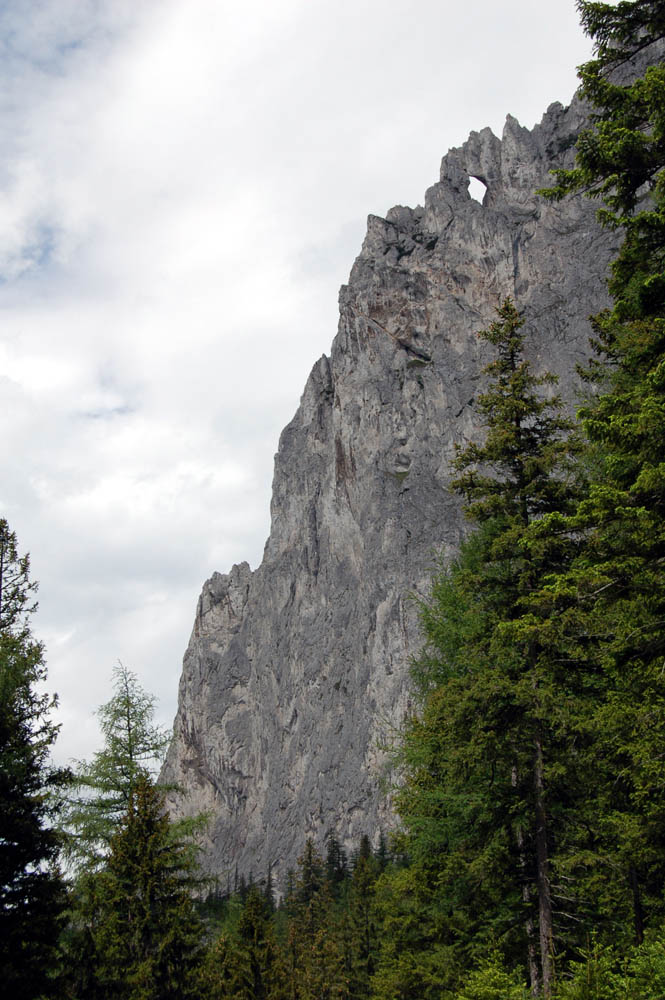
West ridge of Messnerin with the rock window

Messnerin (German: Meßnerin) is a mountain in the Hochschwab Mountains in Styria, Austria, with a height of 1835 m above sea level.

== Literature ==
- Peter Rieder: Alpenvereinsführer Hochschwab. Bergverlag Rudolf Rother, München 1976. ISBN 3-7633-1216-1
