= Tragöß-Sankt Katharein =

- Municipality
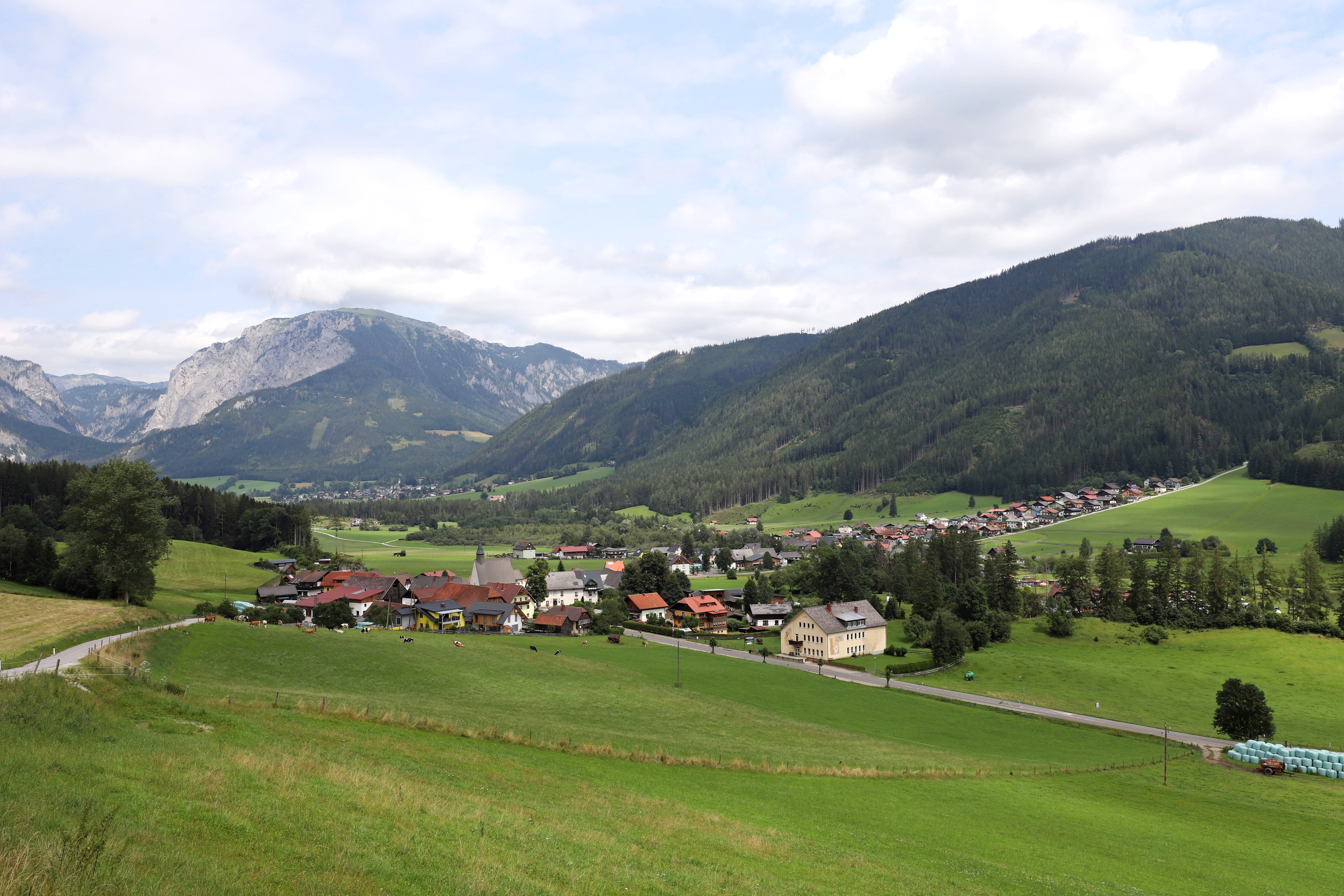
- northern part of the municipality

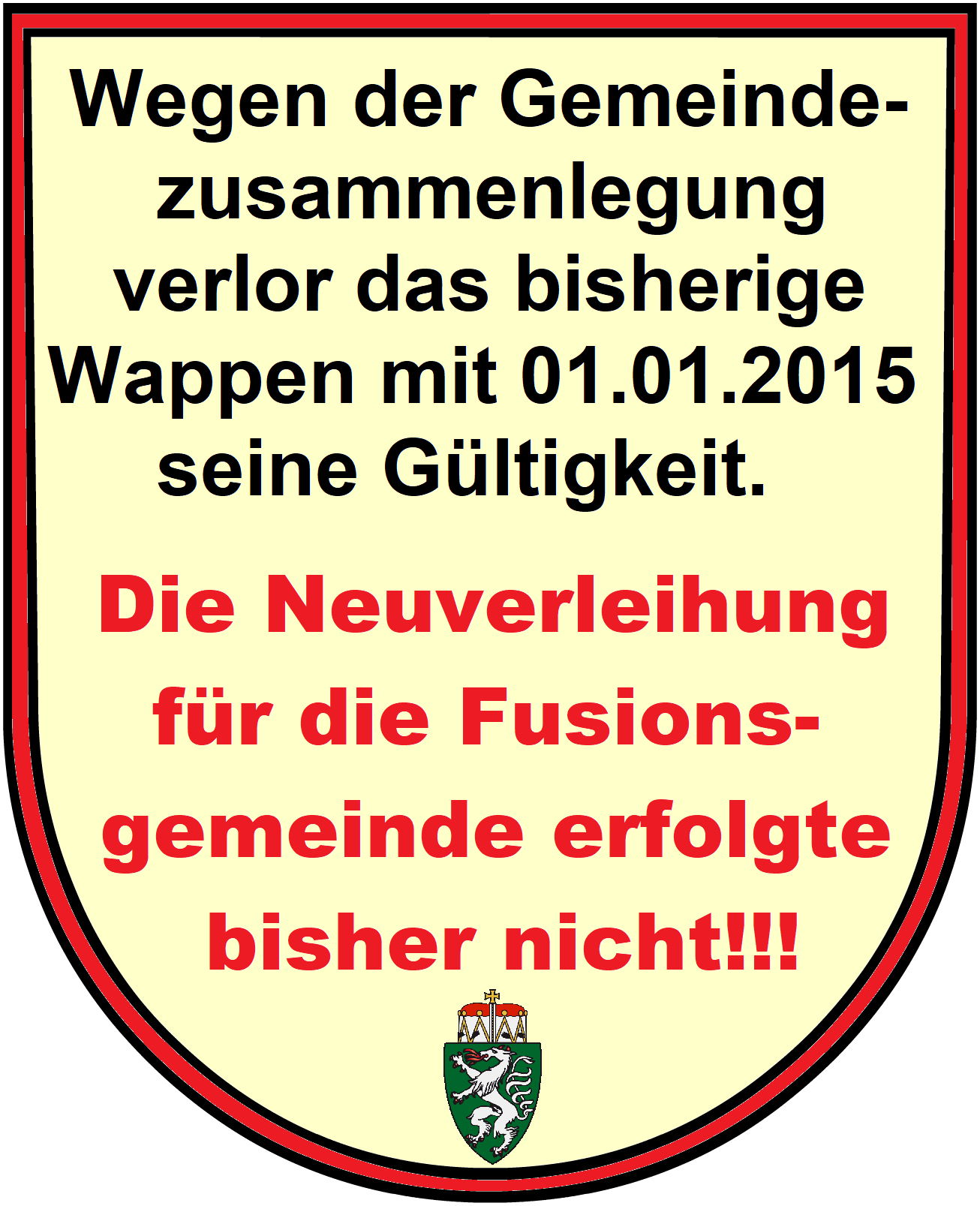
- Coat of arms

- Location within Austria
- Coordinates: 47°28′00″N 15°09′0″E
- Country: Austria
- State: Styria
- District: Bruck-Mürzzuschlag

Government
  - Mayor: Hubert Zinner (ÖVP)

Area
  - Total: 154.44 km^{2} (59.63 sq mi)
- Elevation: 651 m (2,136 ft)

Population (2018-01-01)
  - Total: 1,894
  - Density: 12.26/km^{2} (31.76/sq mi)
- Time zone: UTC+1 (CET)
  - Summer (DST): UTC+2 (CEST)
- Postal code: 8611, 8612
- Area code: 03868, 03869
- Website: tragoess-st-katharein.gv.at

Tragöß-Sankt Katharein is since 2015 a new municipality in Bruck-Mürzzuschlag District in Styria, Austria, which had merged after 31 December 2014 the independent municipalities Tragöß and St. Katharein an der Laming. This merger was part of the Styria municipal structural reform.

The municipality Tragöß, at the Constitutional Court, introduced an appeal against the merger but was not successful. The court dismissed the appeal.

== Geography ==
=== Municipality arrangement ===
The municipality territory includes the following 10 sections (population as of 1 Jan 2015):

- Hüttengraben (57)
- Oberdorf (224)
- Oberort (377)
- Obertal (32)
- Pichl-Großdorf (396)
- Rastal (187)
- Sankt Katharein an der Laming (262)
- Tal (112)
- Unterort (98)
- Untertal (176)

The municipality consists of the eight Katastralgemeinden Hüttengraben, Oberdorf-Niederdorf, Oberort, Obertal, St. Katharein an der Laming Schattenberg, Sonnberg and Untertal.

=== Mountain region ===
The northern part of the municipality is dominated by the plateau of the Hochschwabgruppe. Here lies near the famous Sonnschienalm (with the like-named Schutzhütte) the Frauenmauerhöhle gorge and the Sackwiesensee lake. The following well-known peaks rise over the municipality territory:

- Ebenstein (2,123 m)
- Hochturm (Trenchtling) (2,081 m)
- Griesmauerkogel (2,034 m)
- TAC-Spitze (2,019 m)
- Brandstein (2,003 m)
- Meßnerin (1,835 m)
- Pribitz (1,579 m)

== Administration ==
The former mayors of Tragöß and St. Katharein lost their function, as did the community leaders and the local councils. It was planned for 23 March 2015 that the next municipal elections would take place, where a new municipal council and the mayor are elected. Until the election of the new town council, Hubert Zinner was appointed by the Steiermärkische Landesregierung as a government commissioner. Eduard Lengger (Tragöß) and Werner Mikusch (St. Katharein) were appointed as advisors by the dissolved municipal councils. This practice was a consultative role for the government commissioner.

The municipal office is located in St. Katharein. Tragöß holds a Bürgerservicestelle civil-service branch.

== Culture and sights ==
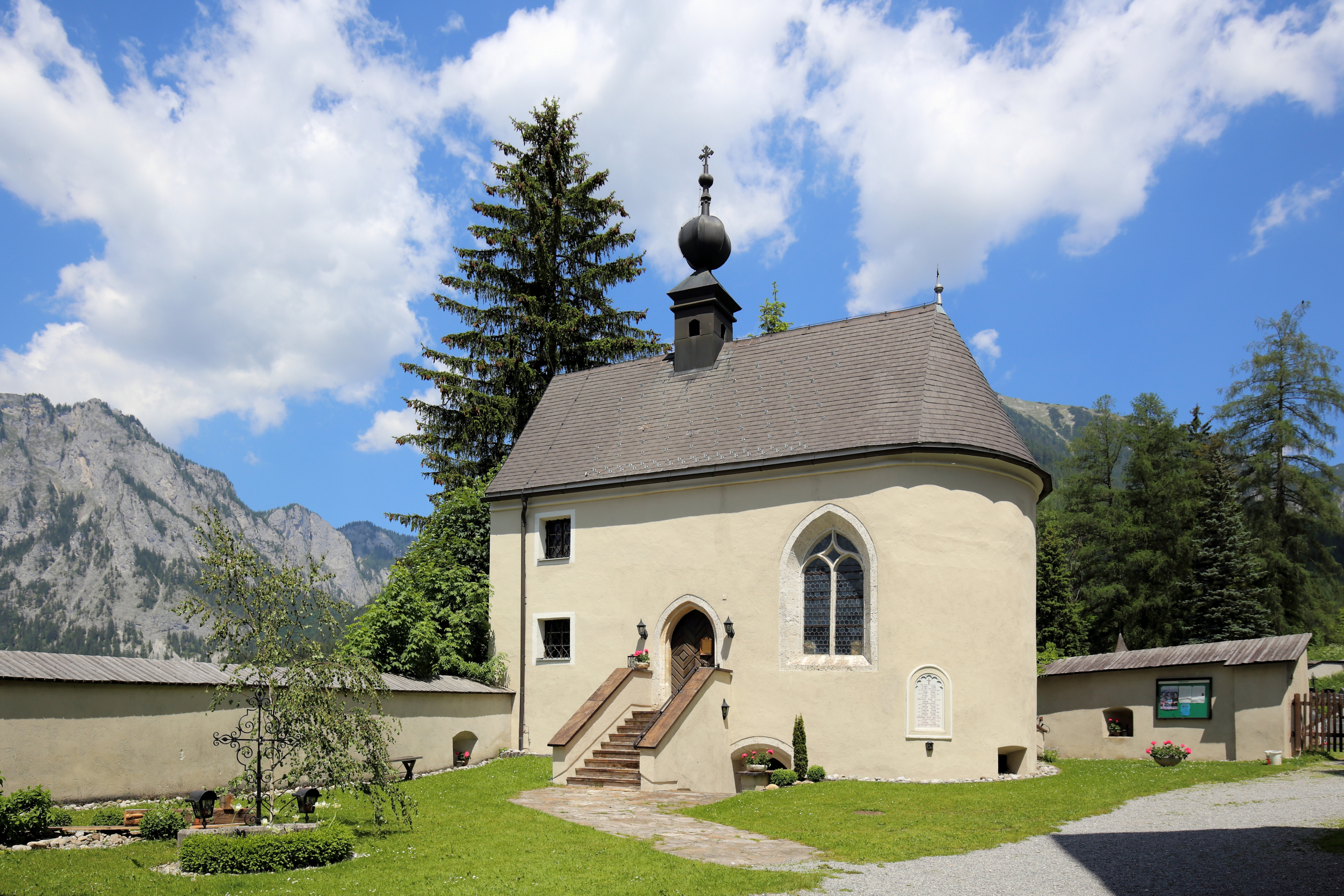
Antoniuskapelle chapel in Oberort

- Antoniuskapelle in Oberort

A late-Gothic building, dated 1518 and 1524, was built on the foundations of a Romanesque carnival. At the end of the 17th century, the chapel was extended by a yoke towards Kirchhofmauer.

- Pfarrkirche St. Magdalena as well as Pfarrhof in Oberort

A former fortified church, partly surrounded by late-Middle Ages walls. The helmet-capped spire of the three-story, late-Gothic tower dates from the year 1923.

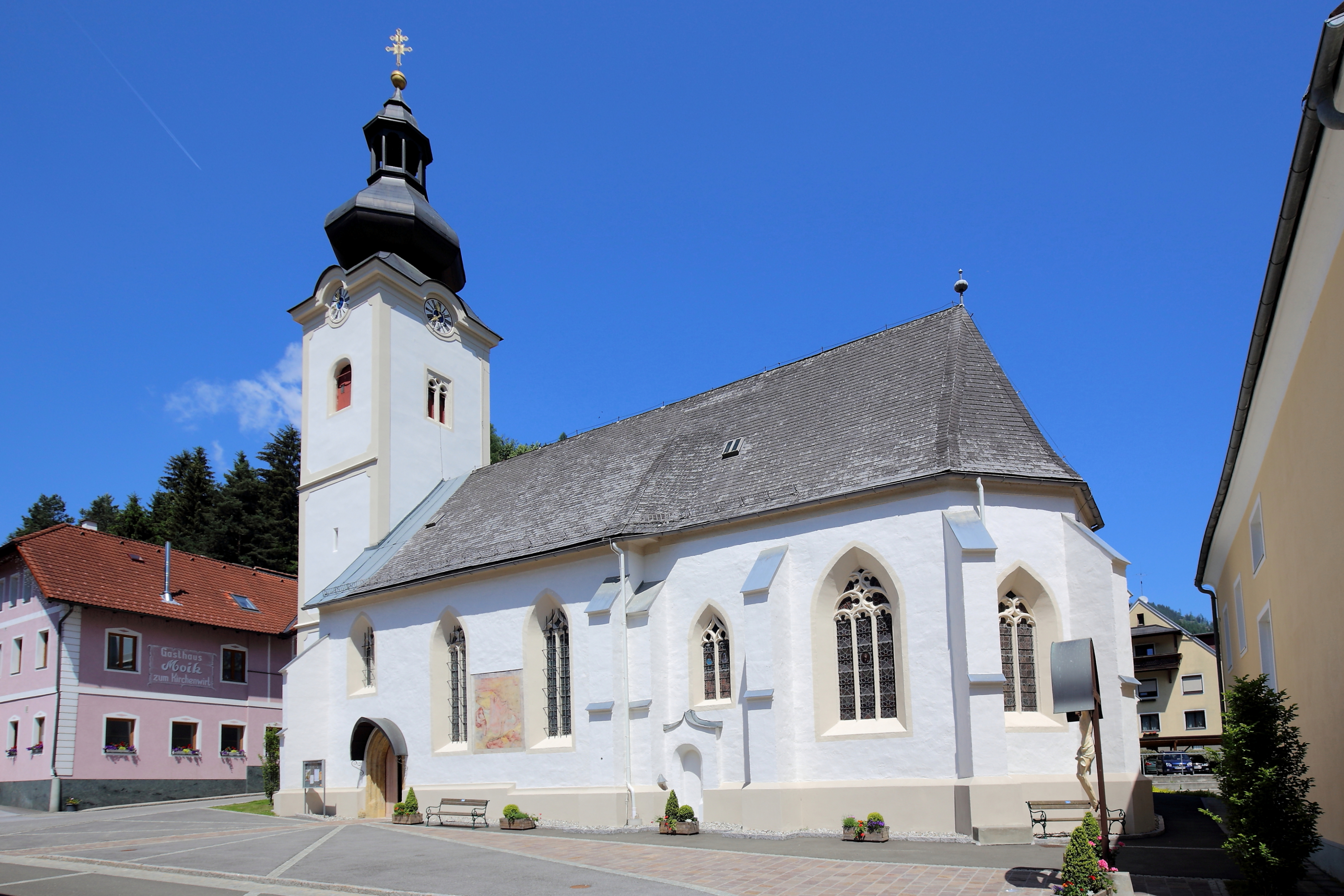
Church Pfarrkirche in St. Katharein an der Laming

- Pfarrkirche hl. Katharina in St. Katharein an der Laming

The main part of the parish church is a late-Gothic building from the beginning of the 16th century. In the Baroque period an onion roof was erected to the Gothic west tower. The baroque high altar dates from around 1700.

- Filialkirche in Pichl

An early-Gothic church, which was enlarged in the 17th century.

- Former gallows in Galgenwald between Pichl-Großdorf and Oberort-Tragöß.

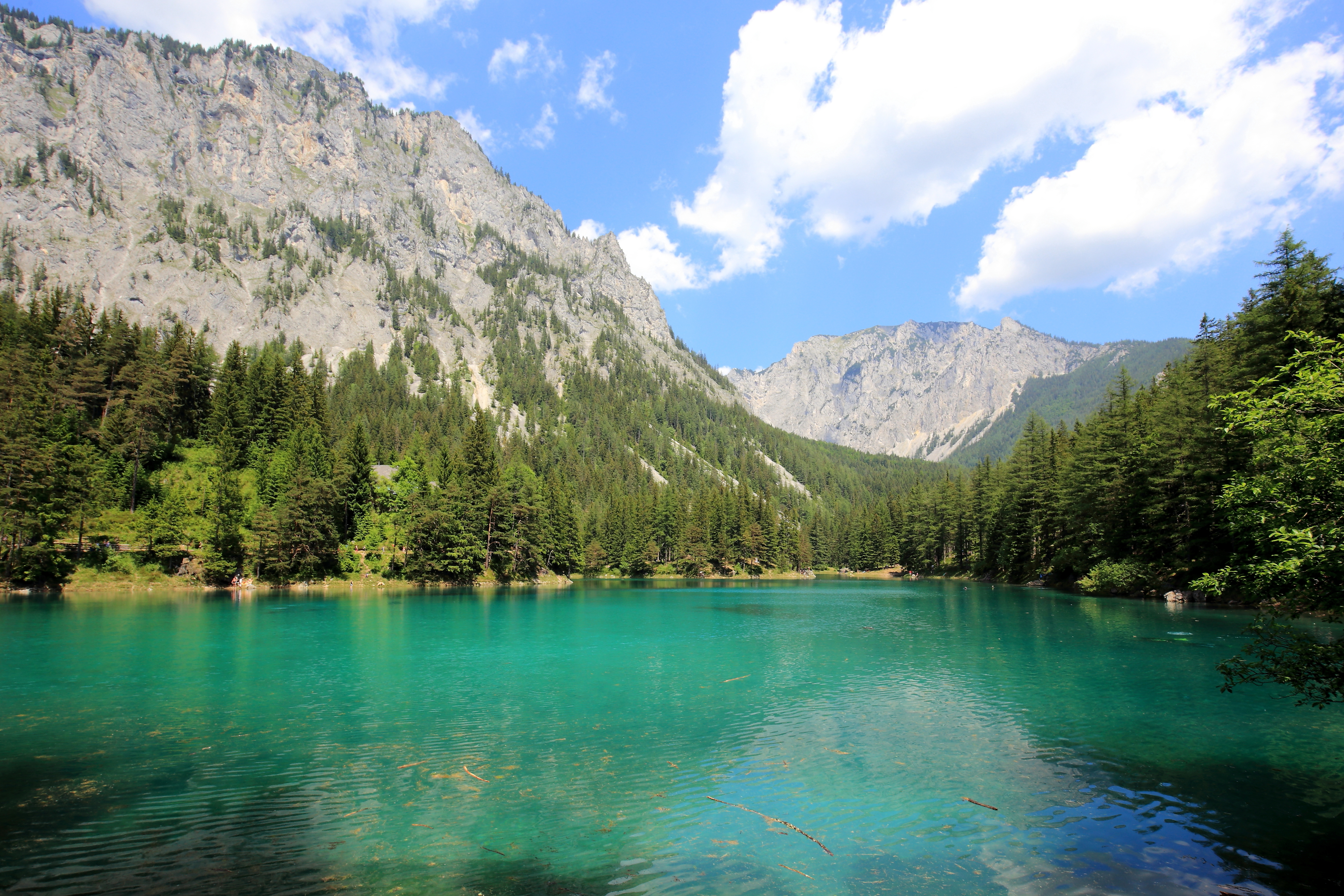
Southwest view of Grünen Sees; in background the Meßnerin peak.

Natural monuments:

- Grüner See in Oberort
- Marienklamm in Oberort
