= Sankt Ilgen =

- Former municipality
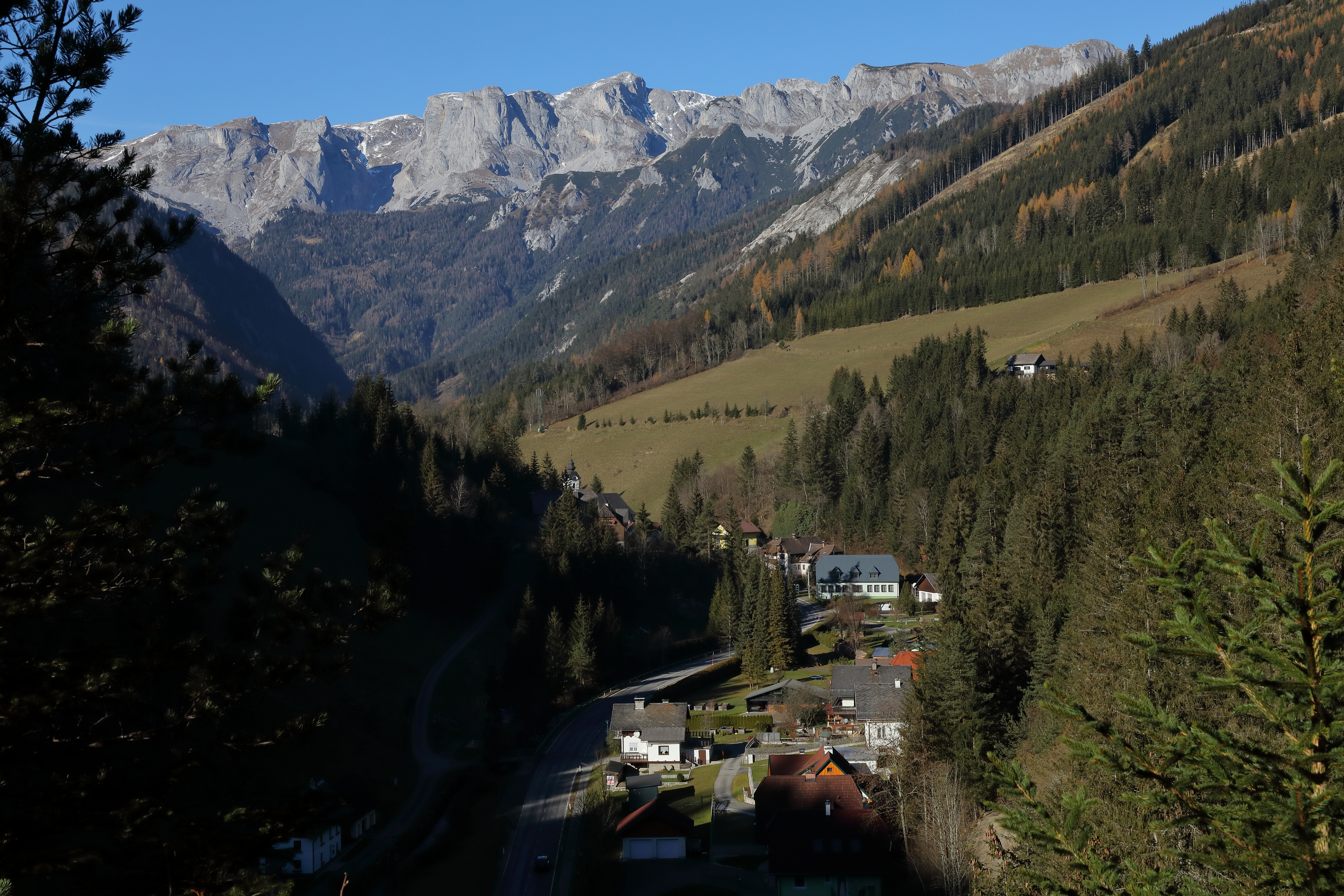
- Sankt Ilgen

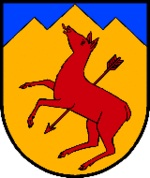
- Coat of arms

- Location within Austria
- Coordinates: 47°32′41″N 15°09′59″E
- Country: Austria
- State: Styria
- District: Bruck-Mürzzuschlag

Area
  - Total: 73.44 km^{2} (28.36 sq mi)
- Elevation: 736 m (2,415 ft)

Population (1 January 2016)
  - Total: 275
  - Density: 3.74/km^{2} (9.70/sq mi)
- Time zone: UTC+1 (CET)
  - Summer (DST): UTC+2 (CEST)
- Postal code: 8621
- Area code: 03861
- Vehicle registration: BM
- Website: www.st-ilgen.at

Sankt Ilgen was a municipality in the district of Bruck-Mürzzuschlag in Styria, Austria.

As of 1 January 2015 it has been incorporated into Thörl.
