= Salza (Enns) =

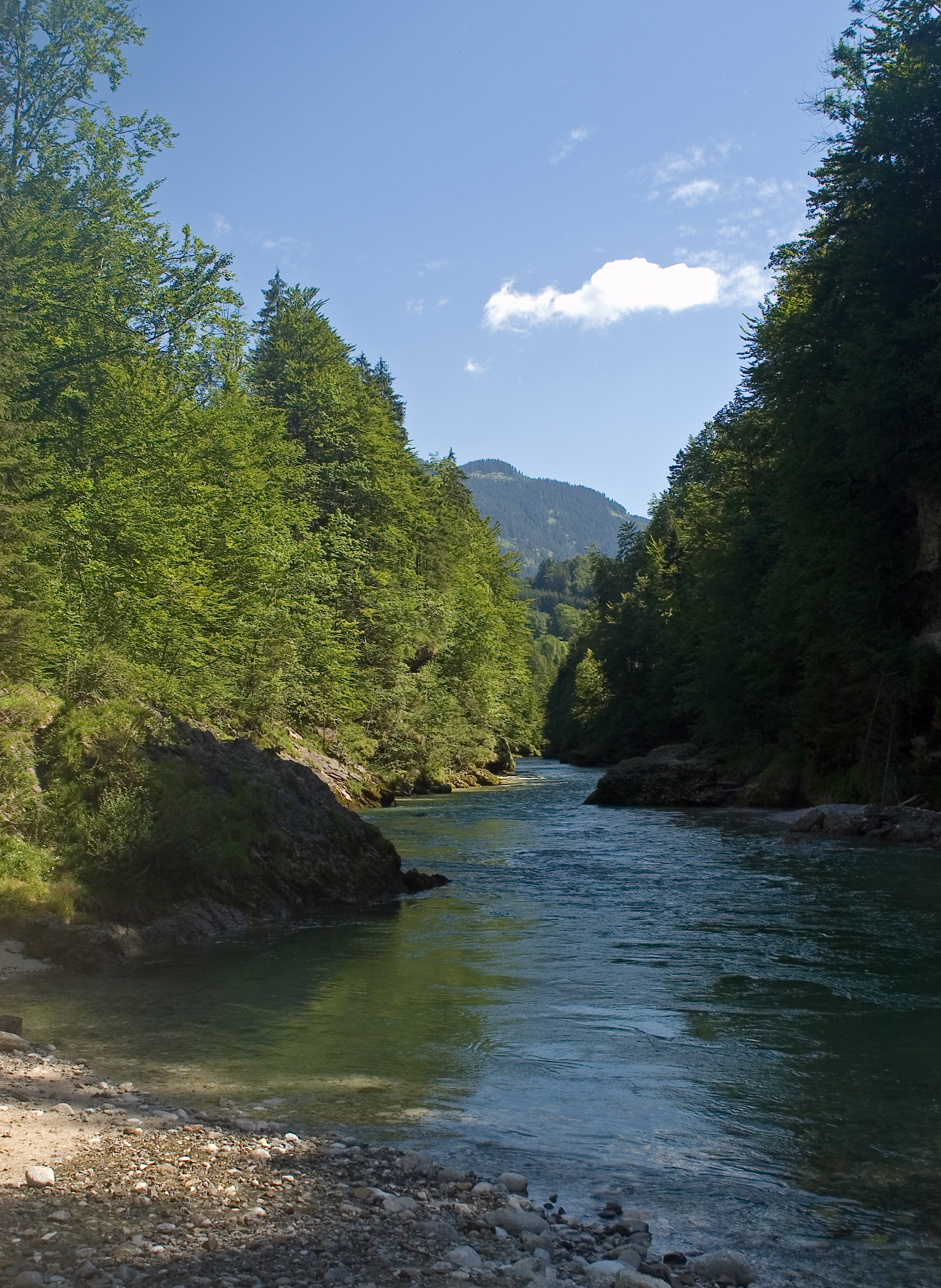
- River Salza near Palfau

Location
- Country: Austria

Physical characteristics
- Source
  - location: Traisenberg, Lower Austria
  - elevation: 449 m (1,473 ft)
- Mouth
  - location: Enns
  - coordinates: 47.6706°N 14.7275°E
- Length: 90.3 km (56.1 mi)
- Basin size: 868 km^{2} (335 sq mi)

Basin features
- Progression: Enns→ Danube→ Black Sea

The Salza (German pronunciation: [ˈzaltsa]; also Mariazeller Salza) is an eastern tributary of the Enns. It originates on the mountain Traisenberg in Lower Austria and flows South of Mariazell through the Styrian nature preserve Wildalpener Salzatal. After 90 km (56 mi), it flows into the Enns near Großreifling (part of Landl). Its drainage basin is 868 km^{2} (335 sq mi).

Below the municipality of Weichselboden (belongs to Mariazell) is the Prescenyklause, a weir (stone dam) used for timber rafting in 1848. Today the water of the reservoir is used to power a small electric power plant. Downstream from the reservoir, the Salza is a favorite site for kayakers.

Numerous springs of small tributaries of the Salza have been captured and are used for the Viennese water supply.
