= Hochschwab =

Mountain in the Austrian Alps

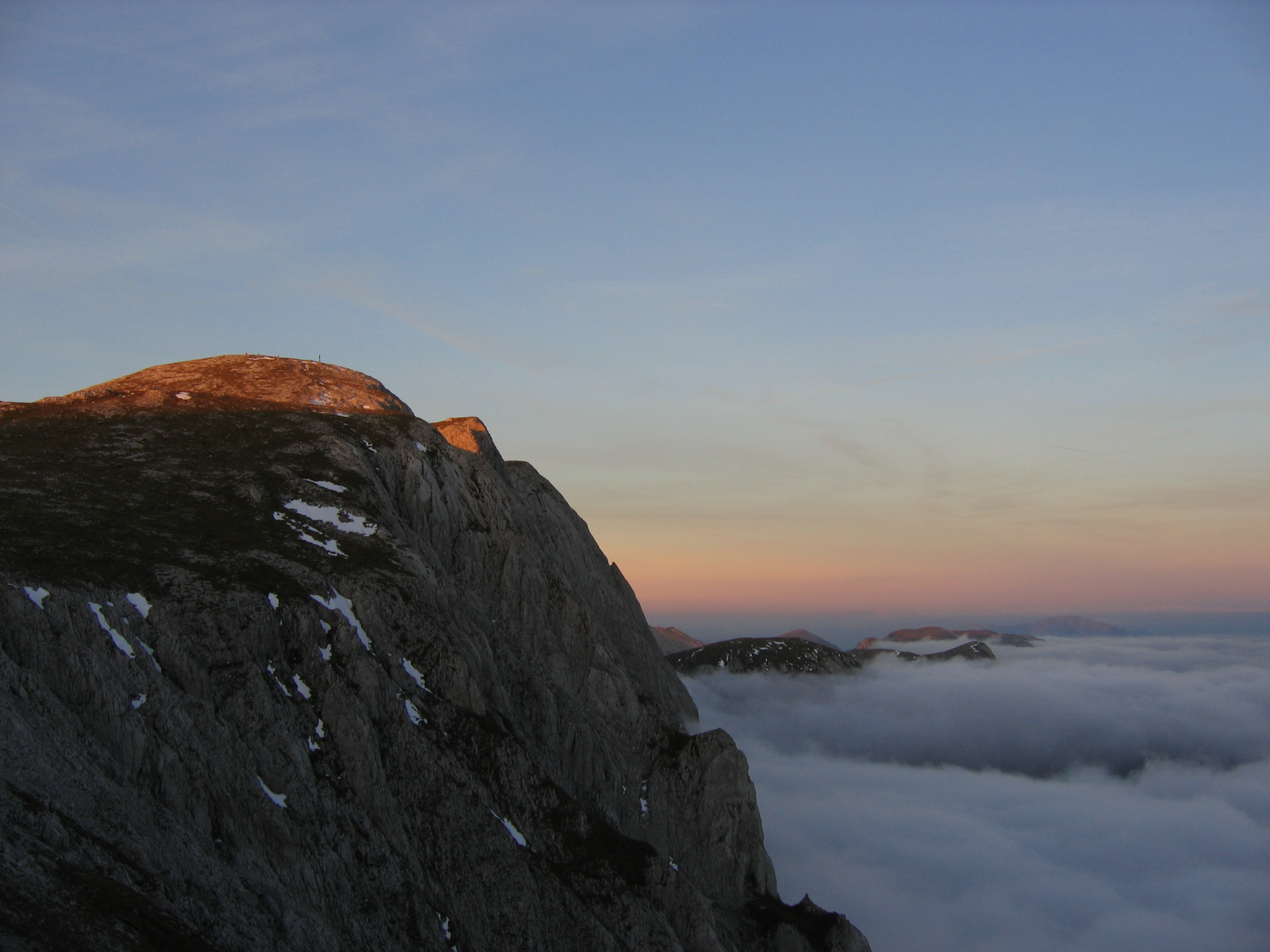
- The Hochschwab summit at sunset

Highest point
- Elevation: 2,277 m (AA) (7,470 ft)
- Prominence: 2,277-1,226 m ↓ Präbichl
- Isolation: 38.8 km → Hochtor
- Coordinates: 47°37′05″N 15°08′32″E

Geography
- Location within Austria
- Location: Styria, Austria
- Parent range: Hochschwab Mountains

Geology
- Rock age: Anisian - Carnian
- Rock type: Wetterstein limestone

Climbing
- Normal route: via the Aflenzer Staritzen (not difficult)

The Hochschwab in the Upper Styria is a mountain, 2,277 m (AA), and the highest summit in the eponymous mountain range.

== Location ==
The summit of the Hochschwab is a flat, rock and grass-covered dome, that may easily be climbed from the Schiestlhaus (2,153 m above sea level (AA)) to the northeast in about half an hour via the plateau to the west (Biwakschachtel Fleischerhütte). The Schiestlhaus may be approached from Seewiesen (974 m above sea level (AA)) at the foot of the Steirischer Seeberg via the Seetal valley, the Untere Dullwitz to the Voisthaler Hut, the Obere Dullwitz and the Graf-Meran-Steig, as well as from the north, from Weichselboden in the Salza valley.

The showpiece of the Hochschwab is its mighty south face which has a width of almost two kilometres and rises to a height of up to 300 metres above the Trawies Saddle and the valleys of Trawiestal (to the southwest) and Obere Dullwitz (to the southeast) which meet at that point. There are climbing routes of all grades up the south face.

== 1988 Hochschwab tragedy ==
In early November 1988 there was a mountaineering tragedy on the Hochschwab, which triggered the biggest search operation ever undertaken by the Styrian mountain rescue service to that date. A seven-man group was trapped for 2 days and nights in storms and icy temperatures at a height of 2,000 metres above sea level. Following the deployment of 150 Alpine gendarmes and mountain rescue personnel as well as five helicopters, five of the party were already found to be dead and the remaining two survived with serious injuries.

== Literature ==
- Liselotte Buchenauer: Hochschwab, 1960 und mehrere Neuauflagen. ISBN 3-7011-7044-4
- Rudolf Ägyd Lindner: Hochschwab, Weishaupt, 2nd edition, 2002. ISBN 978-3900310264
- Peter Rieder: Alpenvereinsführer Hochschwab. Bergverlag Rudolf Rother, Munich, 1976. ISBN 3-7633-1216-1
