= Präbichl =

Präbichl Sattel
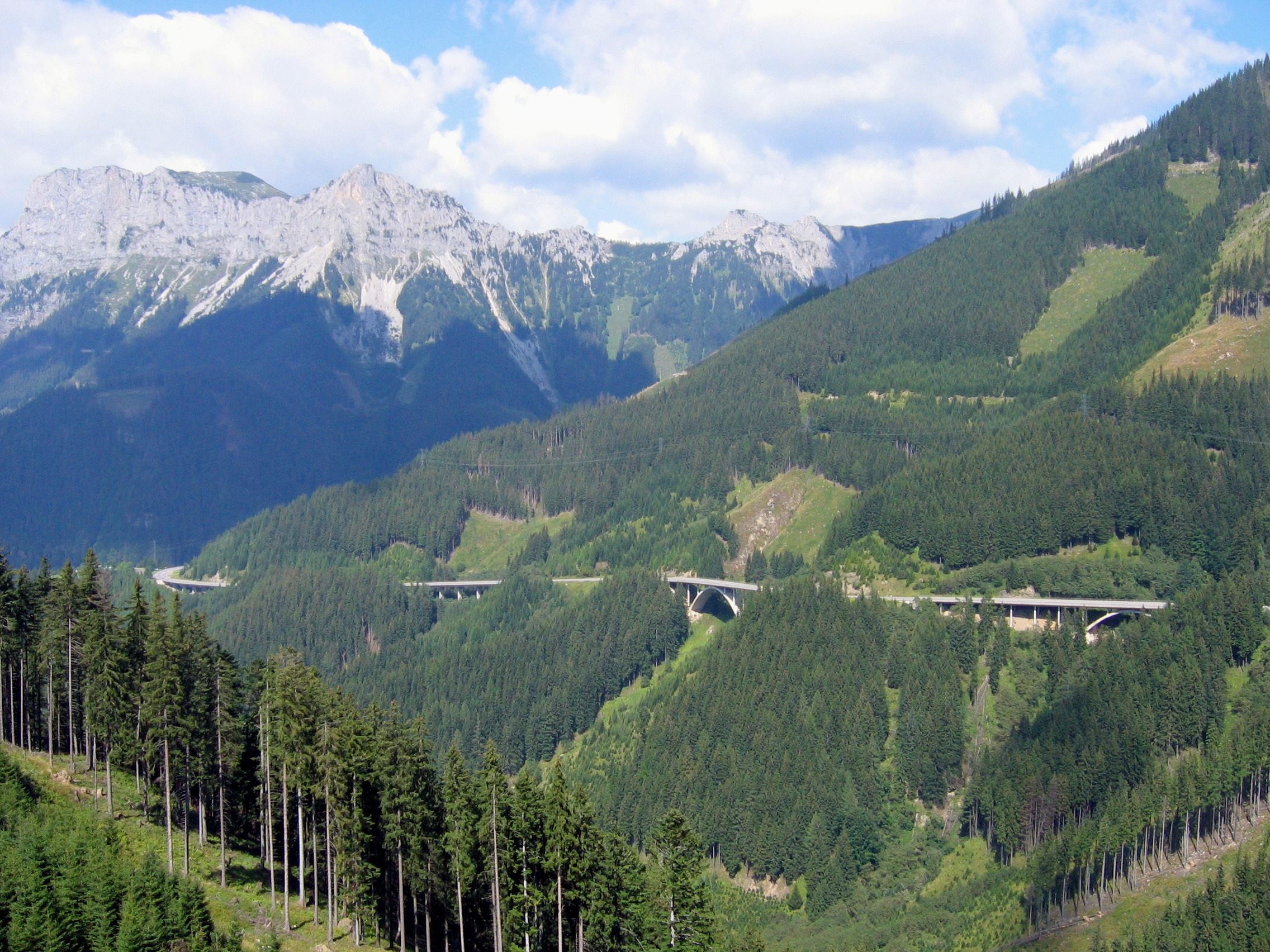
- Northern ramp

- Location within Alps
- Elevation: 1,226 metres (4,022 ft)
- Traversed by: B 115

Third Approach
- Location: Austria
- Range: Alps
- Coordinates: 47°31′N 14°56′E

Präbichl Sattel (German pronunciation: [ˈpʁɛːˌbɪçl̩], el. 1226 m.) is a high mountain pass in the Austrian Alps within the Bundesland of Styria.

== See also ==
- List of highest paved roads in Europe
- List of mountain passes
