= Mürzsteg Alps =

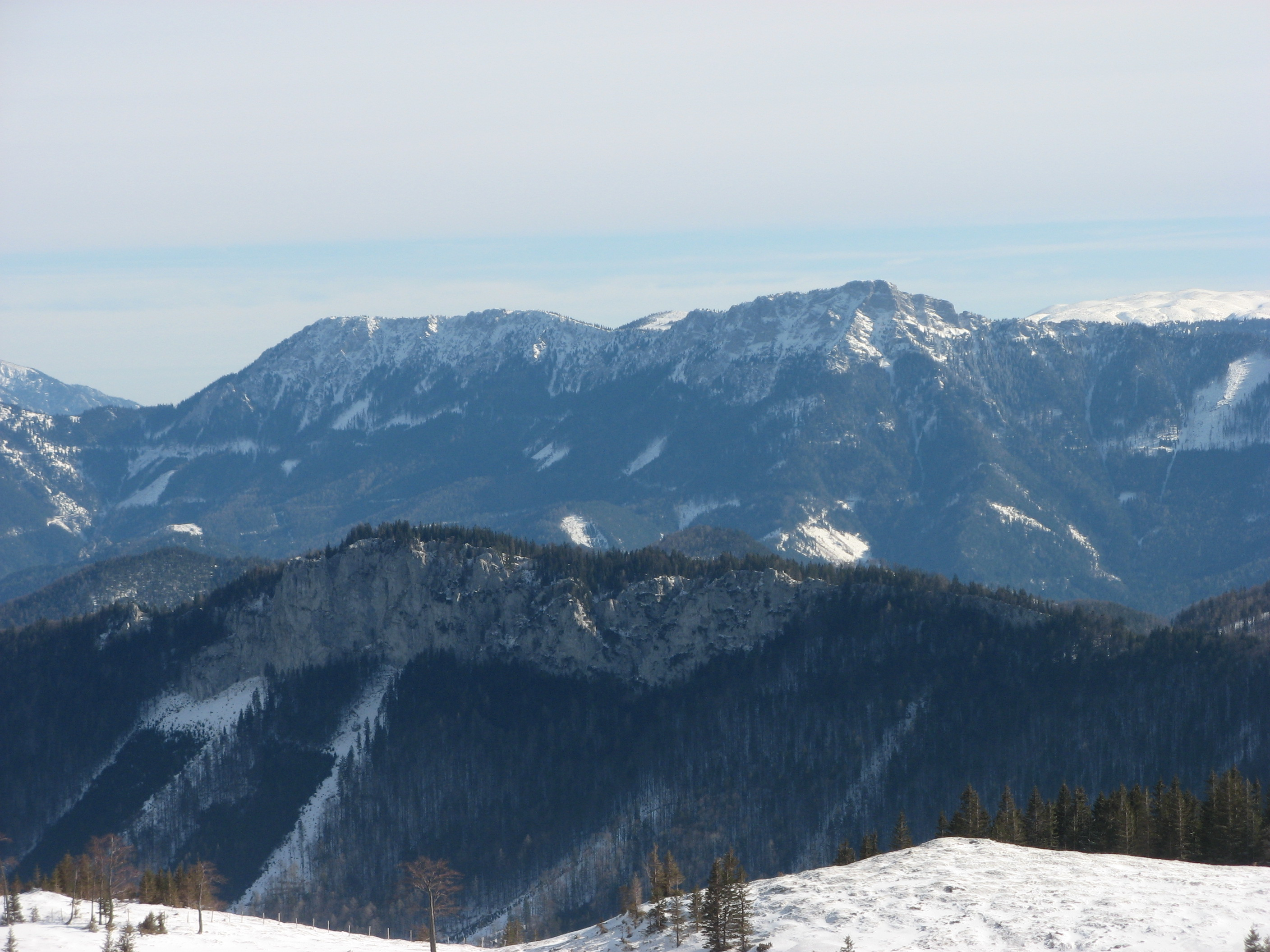
- The Murzsteg Alps

Highest point
- Peak: Hohe Veitsch
- Elevation: 1,981 m above sea level (AA)

Dimensions
- Length: 40 km (25 mi)

Geography
- Location within Alps
- State(s): Styria and Lower Austria
- Range coordinates: 47°38′49″N 15°24′22″E
- Parent range: Northern Limestone Alps

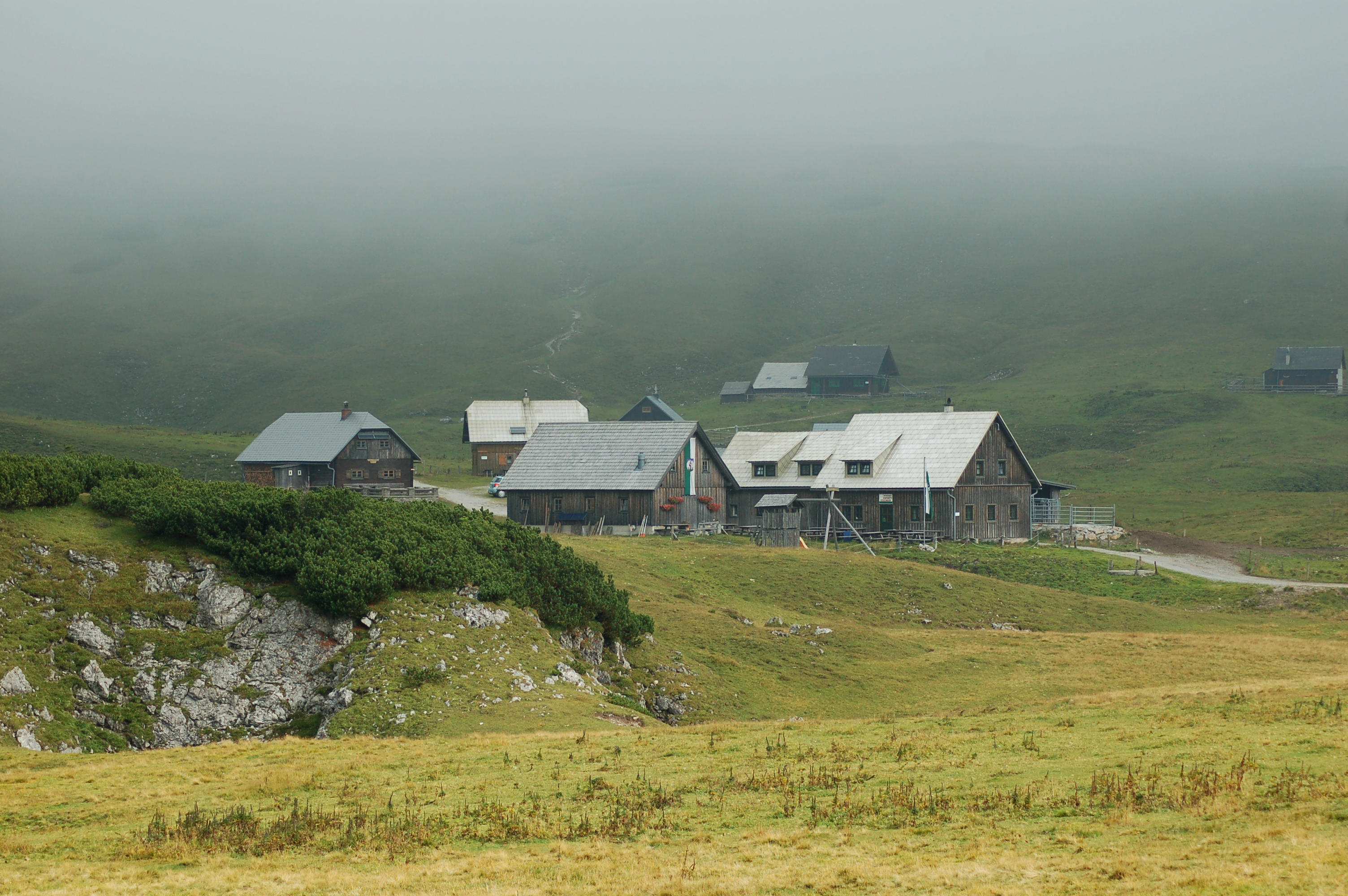
The Michlbauer Hut below Hochnebel

The Mürzsteg Alps or Mürztal Alps (German: Mürztaler or Mürzsteger Alpen) are a mountain range in the Eastern Alps (Northern Limestone Alps), which lie in the Austrian state of Styria, with a small part of the range in Lower Austria. The highest peak is the Hohe Veitsch (1,981 m above sea level (AA)) in the centre of the group, while largest massif is the Schneealpe (1,903 m above sea level (AA)) in the northwest, near the Rax.

The following ranges border on the Mürzsteg Alps: to the north the Türnitz Alps, to the northeast the Gutenstein Alps, to the east the Rax-Schneeberg Group, to the southeast the Prealps east of the Mur (specifically the Fischbach Alps) and to the west the Hochschwab Mountains.

== Geology ==
The range is part of the Styrian-Lower Austrian Limestone Alps and is separated from its neighbouring groups by the Mürz valley (part of the tectonically active Mur-Mürz Furrow), the upper reaches of the Mürz (main settlement: Mürzsteg) and the road over the Styrian Seeberg Pass. It is described by geologists as a ridge-and-basin facies.

The majority of its rocks date to the Triassic period and include Wetterstein Dolomite, Hallstatt Limestone and Mürztal strata (dark, hornstein-dominated limestones and marls with foraminifers, brachiopods and other fossils).
The south of the range belong to the greywacke zone (rocks from the New Palaeozoic and the Lower Triassic).

== Mountain huts ==
- Graf-Meran House (ÖTK, 1,836 m above sea level (AA), on the highlands of the Hohe Veitsch)
- Schneealpen House (ÖAV, 1,788 m above sea level (AA), on the Schauerkogel/Schneealpe)
- Hinteralm House (ÖAV, 1,450 m above sea level (AA), north of the Schneealpe)
- Kutatsch Hut (1,700 m above sea level (AA), open shelter belonging to the ÖAV on the Schneealpe)
- Lurgbauer Hut (private, 1,764 m above sea level (AA), on the upper slopes of the Schneealpe)
- Michlbauer Hut (private, 1,744 m above sea level (AA), on the upper slopes Schneealpe)
- Tonion Hut (Friends of Nature, 1,487 m above sea level (AA), on the Tonion)
- Kaarl Hut (private, 1,310 m above sea level (AA), west of Mürzzuschlag)
