= Türnitz Alps =

Mountain range in Austria and Syria

- Location within Alps

Highest point
- Peak: Großer Sulzberg
- Elevation: 1,400 m above sea level (AA)

Dimensions
- Length: 30 km (19 mi)

Geography
- Country: Austria
- Region: Lower Austria
- Range coordinates: 47°50′19″N 15°23′09″E
- Parent range: Northern Limestone Alps

The Türnitz Alps (German: Türnitzer Alpen) is a mountain range of the Northern Limestone Alps in southern Lower Austria and the adjacent state of Styria. It stretches from the Erlauf valley in the west to the valleys of the Traisen and Unrechttraisen in the east. To the south it is bordered by the Salza valley in Halltal and the municipality of Mariazell.

== Boundaries ==
The Türnitz Alp run from the Erlauf valley in the west to the Traisen valley in the east. In the south they are bounded by the Salza valley.

According to the Alpine Club classification of the Eastern Alps (AVE) the group is bounded as follows:

Alpine Foreland from Wieselburg to St. Pölten – Traisen to Freiland – Unrecht-Traisen – Sankt Aegyd am Neuwalde – Keertal – Knollenhals – Halltal – Mariazell – Erlauf to Wieselburg

== Important peaks and passes ==
The mountain group covers an area of about 30 by 30 km and forms the transition from the pre-alps in the Danube region to the higher peaks of the Mürzsteg Alps, which mostly lie in Upper Styria. The mountains reach a height of 1,400 m in the Großer Sulzberg, and have several other peaks over 1,350 m. The best-known peaks are:

- in the area of the Türnitzer Traisen (the main southwestern valley) towards Annaberg: Türnitzer Höger, Eibl, Hohenstein and Tirolerkogel,
- in the area of the Unrechttraisen: Türnitzer Höger und Traisenberg,
- in the south near Mariazell: the Bürgeralpe.

Notable passes and crossings are:

- to the west the Pielachtaler Gscheid (841 m) and the Annaberg (976 m)
- in the southeast the Kernhofer Gscheid (982 m).

== Geography ==
The valleys of the Türnitz and Traisen have steep mountainous sides and there is little room for settlements. The water quality is high. Summits are largely forested. Only well-known tourist destinations, like the Eibl and Tirolerkogel, have large areas of Alpine pasture (Almen).
