= Styrian-Lower Austrian Limestone Alps =

The Styrian-Lower Austrian Limestone Alps (German: Steirisch-niederösterreichische Kalkalpen) are the easternmost part of the Northern Limestone Alps, running from the River Enns to the Vienna Basin. The high Alpine, limestone massifs of the Hochschwab, Veitsch, Schneealpe, Rax and Schneeberg belong to it as do the limestone prealps to the north as far as the Flysch zone.

The geological conditions in the limestone mountains make this part of the Limestone Alps a valuable drinking water reservoir, from which the Vienna Water Supply (Wiener Wasserversorgung) draws. The geologist, Eduard Suess, pressed the Vienna city council for a water supply from this region as early as 1864. In 1873 the First Vienna Mountain Spring Pipeline (I. Wiener Hochquellenwasserleitung) was opened, running from the Rax-Schneeberg area.

The 2nd pipeline was opened in 1910 and also drew its water from the area of the Styrian-Lower Austrian Limestone Alps, being fed from sources in the Hochschwab region near Wildalpen. The largest spring is the Kläfferquelle at the foot of the Hochschwab, in Styrian Salza valley. This spring supplies 860 million litres per day during the thaw, four times more than can be transported to Vienna through the pipeline. The Vienna Forestry Commission looks after the forests in the catchment area of the sources, which is a designated water protection area. Parts of the forest also belong to Admont Abbey.
