= Erlauf =

Erlauf may refer to:

- Erlauf (municipality), in the district of Melk in Lower Austria
- Erlauf (river), of Lower Austria and Styria
