= Schneealpe =

Mountain massif in Austria

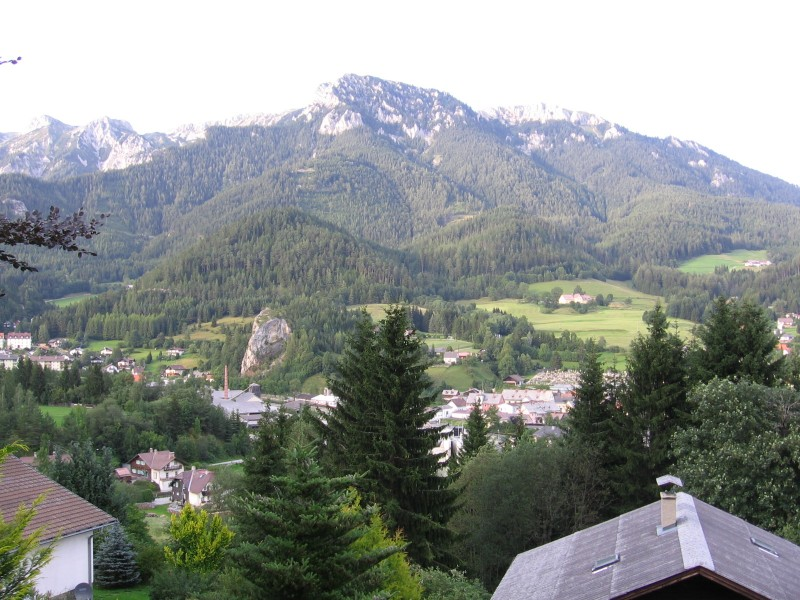
- The Schneealpe massif from Neuberg

Highest point
- Elevation: 1,903 m (AA) (6,243 ft)
- Prominence: 693 m ↓ Naßkamm
- Isolation: 7.3 km → Heukuppe
- Coordinates: 47°42′12″N 15°35′35″E

Geography
- Location within Austria
- Location: Styria, Austria
- Parent range: Mürzsteg Alps

Geology
- Mountain type: Plateau mountain

Climbing
- Normal route: Walkable

The Schneealpe or Schneealm is a limestone massif in the Northern Limestone Alps on the Styrian-Lower Austrian border. Its highest point is the Windberg at 1,903 metres above sea level. Other peaks are the Ameisbühel (also Amaißbichl, 1,828 m, in the east, on the Styrian-Lower Austrian border), the Schönhaltereck (1,860 m, west of the Windberg) and the Donnerwand (1,799 m, in the northwest).

Its valley settlements are Hinternaßwald in the northeast, Altenberg an der Rax in the east, Kapellen and Neuberg an der Mürz in the south, Mürzsteg and Frein an der Mürz in the west. The heavily wooded mountains and hills north of the Schneealpe are uninhabited.

The Schneealpen House and several alm huts are located the high plateau at a height of about 1,780 metres. On the western perimeter of the plateau on the Hinteralm is another Alpine Club hut, the Hinteralm House. In the northern area is the source region of the Kalte Mürz. The Schneealpen area belongs, together with the Rax and the Schneeberg, to the catchment area of the First Vienna Mountain Spring Pipeline (I. Wiener Hochquellenwasserleitung). Drinking water is led through the Schneealpen Tunnel, built between 1965 and 1968 by the city of Vienna, to Hinternaßwald.

== Mountain huts ==
- Schneealpen House (Schneealpenhaus)
- Michlbauer Hut
- Lurgbauer Hut
- Neuberger Hut (self-catering hut; operator: Naturfreunde)
- Hinteralmhaus (Wiener-Lehrer Hut, self-catering hut; operator: Austrian Alpine Club)
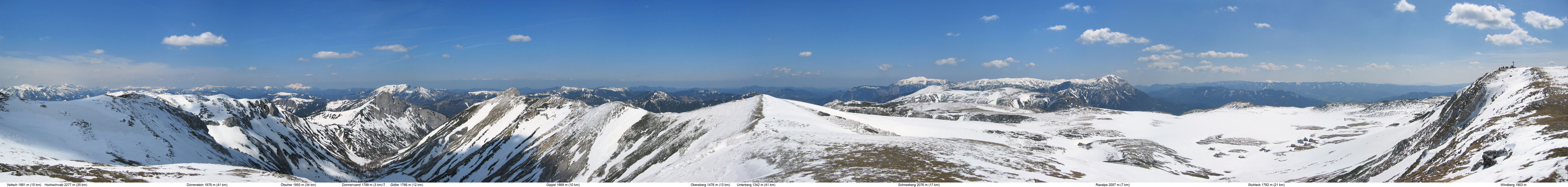
Panoramic view from the northern side of the Windberg
