= Hohe Veitsch =

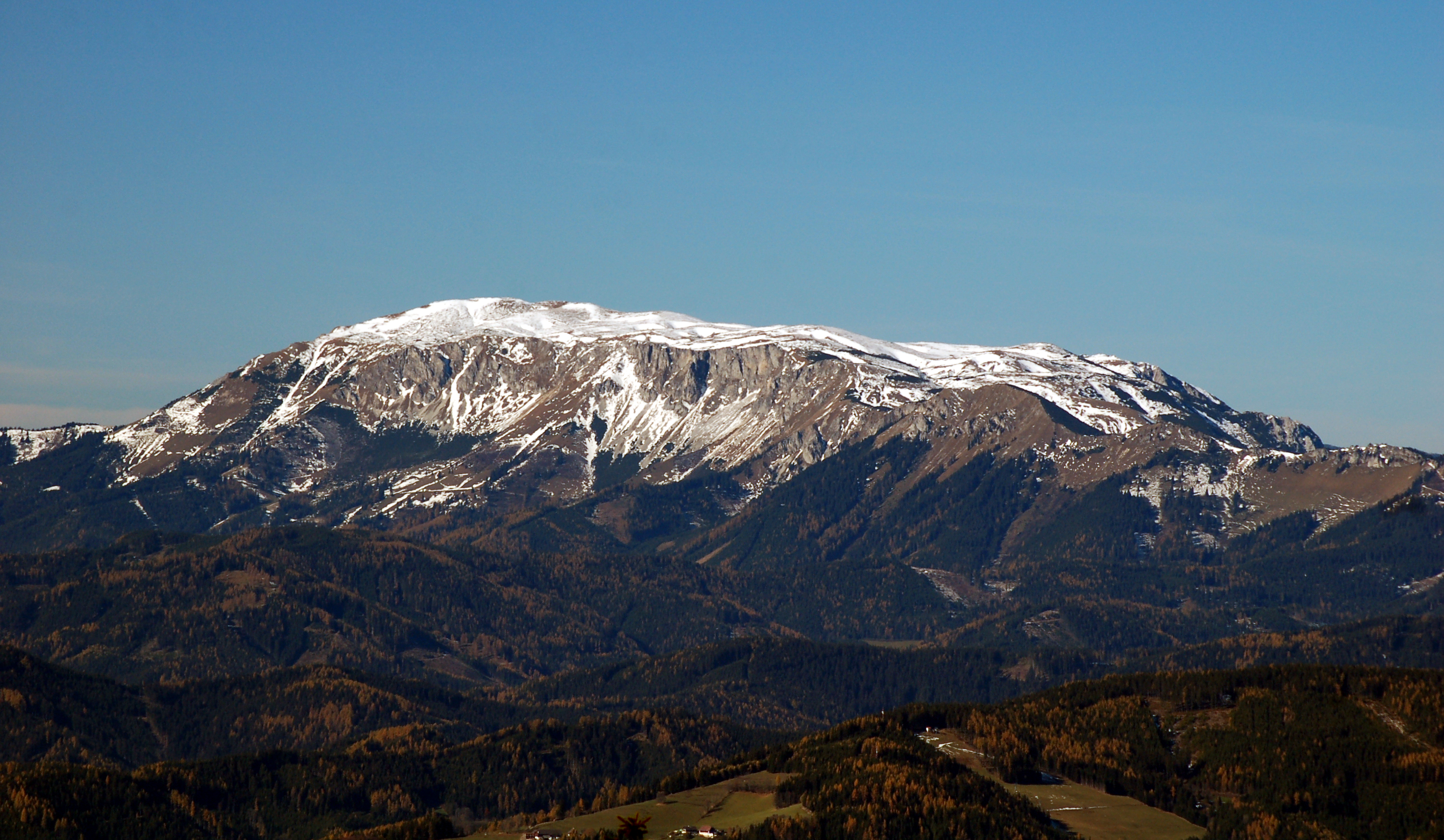
- View of the Hohe Veitsch from Pretul

Highest point
- Elevation: 1,981 m (AA) (6,499 ft)
- Prominence: 728 m ↓ Styrian Seeberg
- Isolation: 12.7 km → Krautgartenkogel
- Listing: Highest mountains of Austria
- Coordinates: 47°38′49″N 15°24′22″E

Geography
- Location within Austria
- Country: Austria
- State: Styria
- Parent range: Mürzsteg Alps

Geology
- Mountain type: Plateauberg

The Hohe Veitsch (1,981 m) is the highest mountain in the Mürzsteg Alps, in the Austrian state of Styria. It is a limestone massif, rich in wildflower meadows and good views, and runs from west (main summit, 1,981 m (AA)) to east (plateau at about 1,500 metres) to the Klein-Veitsch Alm, a distance of around 5.5 km.

== Ascent ==
The best known tour on the Veitsch runs from Niederalpl (1,223 m above sea level (AA)) up to the Sohlenalm (1,352 m above sea level (AA)), along the western side of the Wildkamm, then through a stone gully up to the high plateau. On the plateau, just below the summit, is the Graf Meran House owned by the Austrian Tourist Club (ÖTK, 1,836 m above sea level (AA)). Seen from the south, from (Mitterdorf / Brunnalm, in the parish of Veitsch), the Hohe Veitsch looks like a mighty limestone massif with steep south faces. The Graf Meran House is reached over the Goaß ascent (Goaß-Steign, about 2½ hours) or along the Serpentine Way (Serpentinenweg) left of the so-called 'Hundsschupfen' (around an hour). The north-south long distance path no. 05 runs from Niederalpl to the summit, where it meets North Alpine Way 01 (Nordalpenweg 01) running from the east over the high plateau; then both paths continue in parallel to each other in a westerly direction via Turnauer Alm and Göriacher Alm to the Styrian Seeberg. The Styrian Mariazell Way also runs over the massif.

Plateau walk

There is also a plateau walk via Seeboden to the Kleinveitschalm.
