= Windischgarsten =

- Municipality
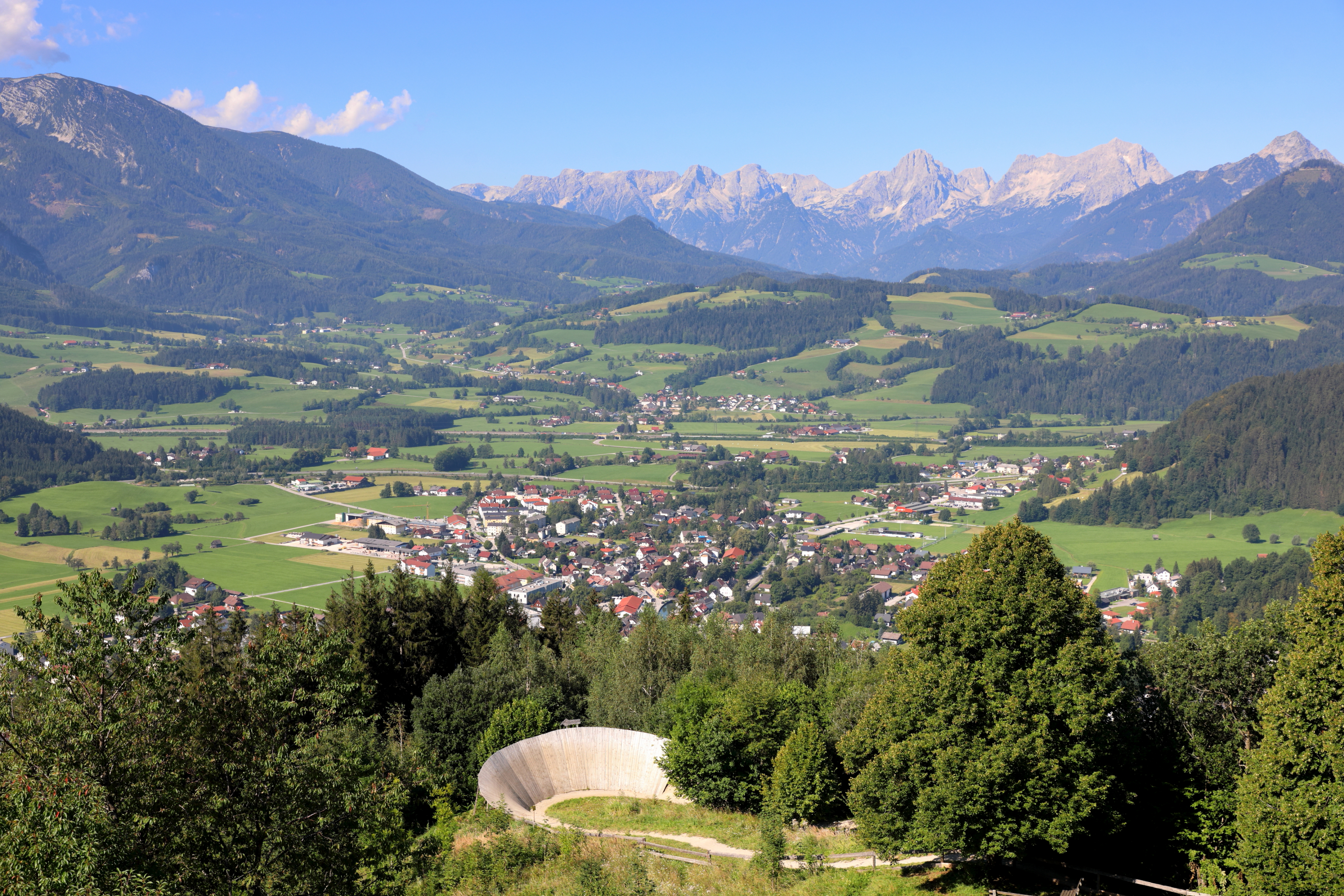
- Windischgarsten seen from Wurbauerkogel

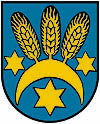
- Coat of arms

- Location within Austria
- Coordinates: 47°43′16″N 14°19′51″E
- Country: Austria
- State: Upper Austria
- District: Kirchdorf an der Krems

Government
  - Mayor: Bernhard Rieser (SPÖ)

Area
  - Total: 4.91 km^{2} (1.90 sq mi)
- Elevation: 602 m (1,975 ft)

Population (2018-01-01)
  - Total: 2,392
  - Density: 487/km^{2} (1,260/sq mi)
- Time zone: UTC+1 (CET)
  - Summer (DST): UTC+2 (CEST)
- Postal code: 4580
- Area code: 07562
- Vehicle registration: KI
- Website: www.windischgarsten.at

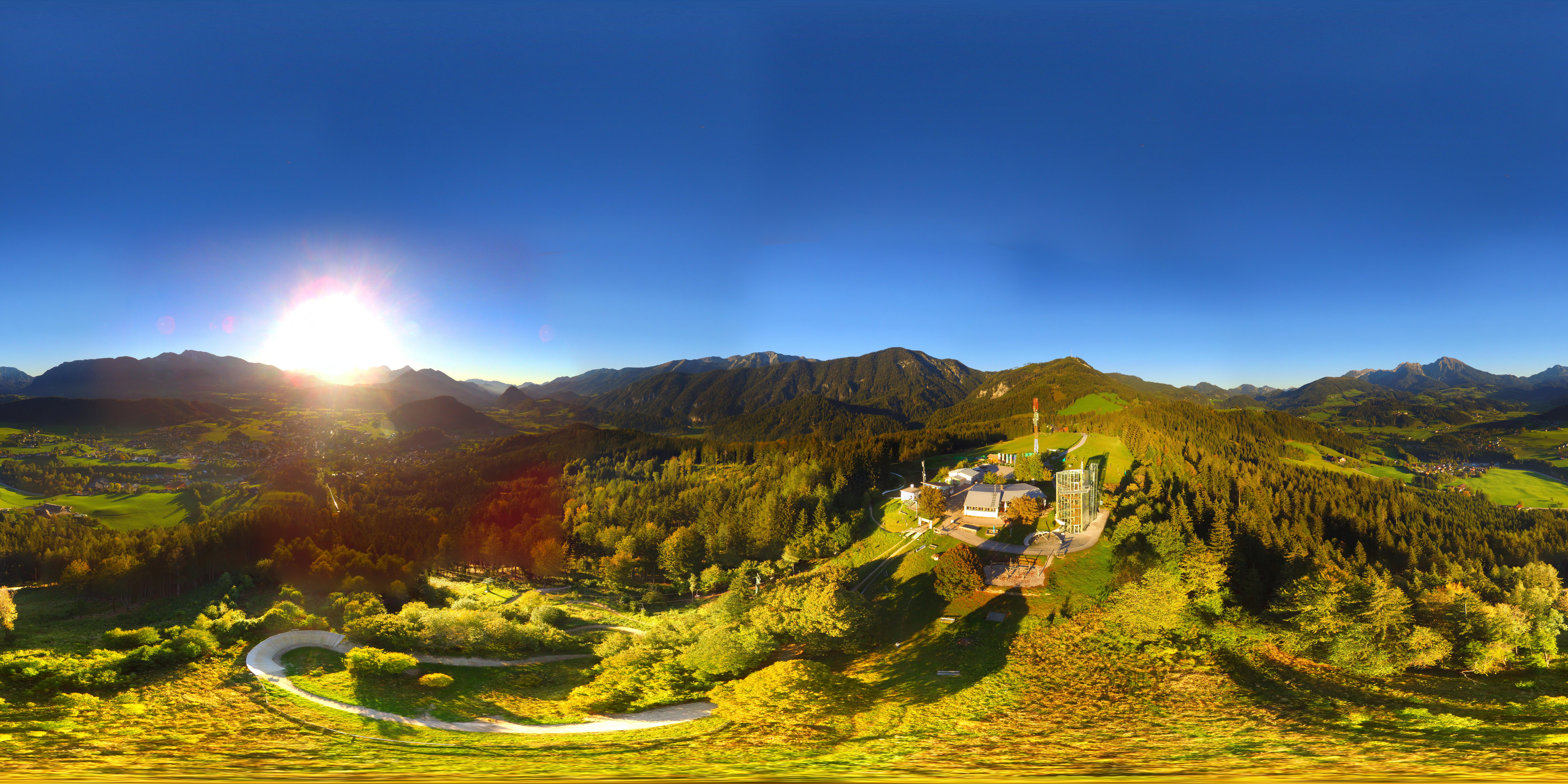
360° airborne panorama of Wurbauerkogel, shot south of its Panorama Tower (view as a 360° interactive panorama)

Windischgarsten is a municipality in the district of Kirchdorf an der Krems in the Austrian state of Upper Austria. Since 1964, the town has been classified as a Luftkurort, a mountain spa town.

== Geography ==
Windischgarsten lies in the Traunviertel and is surrounded by mountains: the Haller Mauern in the South, the Sengsengebirge in the North, and the Totes Gebirge in the West.

River system: Dambach, Teichl, Steyr, Enns and Danube

== History ==
Roman Windischgarsten (Gabromagus) lay to the Southwest and was a mansio (a stopping place) on the Norican Main Road (see Tabula Peutingeriana) that existed between the 2nd and 5th centuries. The name "Gabromagus" has Celtic roots and allows two interpretations: Gabro is a Celtic name but also means Goat (male and female). And Magus is clearly a field. In German a "Bocksfeld" (ram's field) or field of Gabro. Archaeological digs show quite complex structures which could point to a settlement set up for trading. But recovered bricks with the stamp of the 2nd Italian Legion also point to a possible military installation. The settlement saw its high point around 200 and then declined. We next hear about Windischgarsten around 1200: to differentiate from the "Garsten" by Steyr, which was largely German and the settlement in the valley, which was largely settled by "Windische" or Wends (Slovenes). Garsten has its roots in the Slavic term for mountainous woods. Based on the development of the language it is assumed that the name was already in use around 800.

Contemporary Windischgarsten was founded as part of the Duchy of Bavaria. During the Carolingian dynasty, around the year 800, a command post was likely set up with the name "Waldbergland" where a group of Alpine Slavs were concentrated. In the 11th century, this settlement became central to the Archdiocese of Bamberg. As the pilgrim population grew during the First Crusade, the settlement became a hub of religious activity. A church was likely founded in 1119 ("in garsten capellam"), roughly dated to the reign of Bishop Otto I of Bamberg, 1102–1139. The current church of Windischgarsten (St.Jacob maior, August 14, 1462, and the defensive tower (Wehrturm)was built in 1495. The term "Garsten" was applied both to the settlement and the whole valley ("in Garsten situm"), right up to 1300. In the following centuries, the population grew due to the continual influx of pilgrims and farmers. Documents show that the population elected a mayor (Dorfmeister - magister villae) in 1269. In 1492 the village had: two leather works, one furrier, three smithies, two mills (flour), one tailor, two butchers, one weaver, one locksmith, one rope-maker and one stonemason. Rope making and wire pulling became two of the strongest trades by 1577. By 1600 the village had 41 different trades living and working and was accorded the privilege of being a "Market Town".

After the Anschluss, the area became part of the Reichsgau Oberdonau. At the vote on April 10, 1938, only one vote against joining Germany was counted. By the end of the Second World War, 122 Windischgarsteners were either dead or missing. 1945 the market town counted 220 houses, by 1993 this had grown to more than 600. After the war the market town became known for its Alpine tourism and is particularly popular with skiers and hikers. On September 1, 1964, the market town was designated a "Luftkurort", a health resort.

The market town made headlines at the turn of the millennium as the former mayor Franz Hufnagl was sentenced to three years in prison, charged with rape, sexual assault, and abuse of authority.

On 31 January 2009, Pope Benedict XVI appointed local priest Gerhard Maria Wagner auxiliary bishop of Linz. He turned down the post fifteen days later amidst controversy over his belief that sin had caused Hurricane Katrina.

== Politics ==
The current mayor is BERNHARD RIESER of the SPO. The Local Council consists of 13 ÖVP members, and 9 seats for the SPÖ.

Mayors since 1850:

- 1850–1867 Leopold Westermayr
- 1867–1873 Ferdinand Hofbauer
- 1873–1879 Michael Zöls
- 1879–1894 Gerhard Purgleitner
- 1894–1903 Emil Zeller
- 1903–1917 Franz X. Schröckenfux
- 1917–1919 Emil Zeller
- 1919–1922 Franz Lechner
- 1922–1924 Dicketmüller
- 1924–1929 Franz Lechner
- 1929–1934 Hans Fischer
- 1934–1942 Franz Lechner
- 1942–1945 Franz Scheer, NSDAP
- 1945–1945 Franz Lechner
- 1945–1951 Rudolf Sulzbacher, SPÖ
- 1951–1967 Hans Gmeiner, SPÖ
- 1967–1979 Josef Seidlmann, SPÖ
- 1979–1991 Hans Pernkopf, ÖVP
- 1991–2000 Franz Hufnagl, SPÖ
- 2000–2020 Norbert Vögerl, ÖVP
- 2020 Barbara Blutaumüller, ÖVP caretaker
- 2020–2021 Michael Eibl, ÖV

2021- BERNHARD RIESER, SPO
