= Bürgeralpe =

Mountain in Austria

Coordinates: 47°47′N 15°19′E

Bürgeralpe is a mountain in Lower Austria that overlooks Mariazell with an elevation of 1270m. It can be seen from Hochbarnek as one of the furthest mountains away.
