= Sengsengebirge mountains =

Folded mountain range in the Upper Austrian Pre-Alps

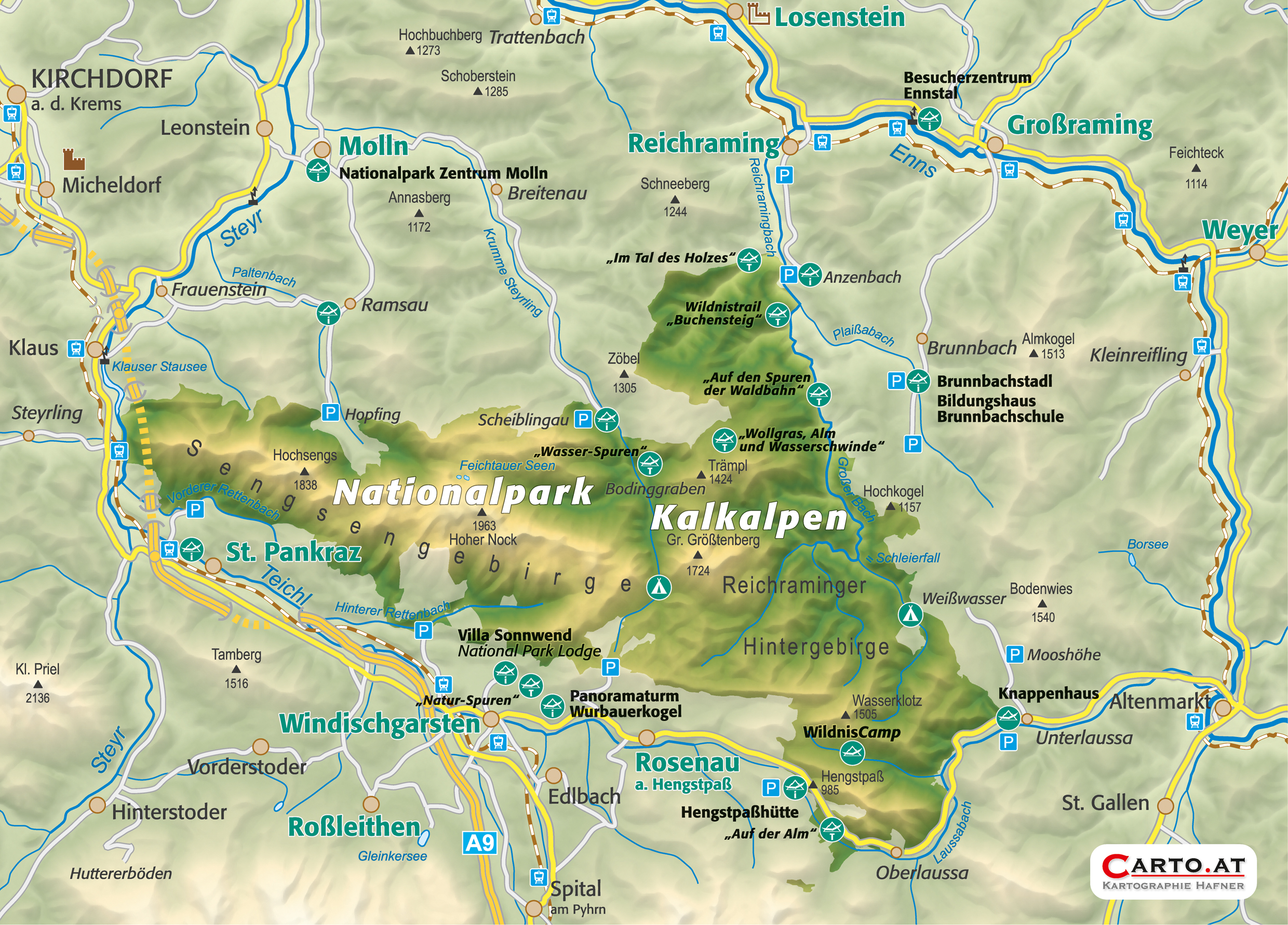
- The Sengsengebirge in the western part of the Kalkalpen National Park

Highest point
- Peak: 1963 m, High Nock

Dimensions
- Area: 75 km^{2} (29 sq mi)

Geography
- Location: Upper Austria
- Country: Austria
- Range coordinates: 47°47′N 14°19′E

The Sengsengebirge mountains are a folded mountain range in the Upper Austrian Pre-Alps and is part of the Northern Limestone Alps. The heavily karstified mountain range consists mainly of Wetterstein limestone, drains mostly underground and is criss-crossed by several large caves, including the Klarahöhle with a length of over 31 kilometers. The highest elevation is the Hohe Nock at 1,963 m (AA). A large part of the Sengsengebirge has been a nature reserve since 1976 and has been integrated into the Kalkalpen National Park since 1997.

The name can be traced back to the extensive use of its forests in the Middle Ages by scythe forges, of which only a few remain today. The farmers of the region used the manorial forests, which today are mostly managed by the Austrian Federal Forests, for the production of charcoal. Until the 19th century, a large number of mountain pastures were used for mountain farming. The Sengsengebirge was developed for tourism at the beginning of the 20th century and offers a variety of opportunities for hiking, snowshoe and ski tours and some climbing routes.

== Geography ==
The Sengsengebirge has a maximum extension between the Steyr in the west and the Krummen Steyrling in the east of 20 km and from north to south of 6 km; it covers a total area of about 75 km².The western border is formed by the upper Steyrtal near Klaus an der Pyhrnbahn and St. Pankraz. South of the confluence of the Hinterer Rettenbach with the Teichl to the Haslersgatter 1,154 m above sea level (AA) is the Windischgarstner Becken. The Krumme Steyrling to Bodinggraben forms the eastern border and separates the Sengsengebirge from the Reichraminger Hintergebirge. The northern border runs from Bodinggraben via the Ramsau-Molln shooting range to the Steyr. Administratively, the Sengsengebirge is located entirely in the district of Kirchdorf. The municipalities of Molln, Rosenau am Hengstpaß, Roßleithen and St. Pankraz have a share in the Sengsengebirge (in alphabetical order).

=== Geomorphology ===
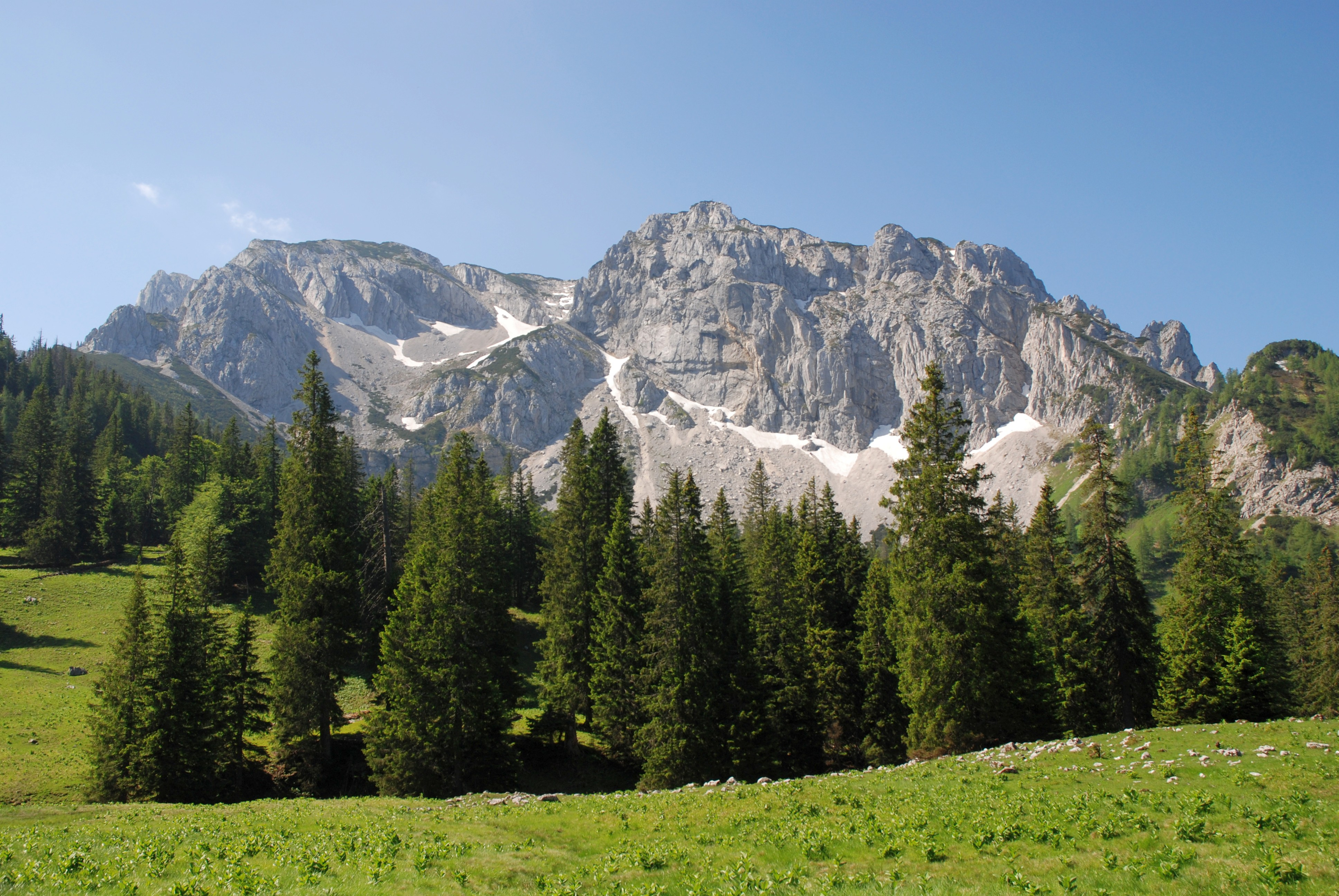
View of the northern slopes of the Seehagelmauer, which drops steeply to the Feichtau

Typical of the Sengsengebirge is the pronounced chain shape caused by the steep stratification. The northern precipices are very steep, rocky and reach wall heights of up to 600 meters. The southern slopes are less exposed and partly interrupted by secondary plateaus. Between Spering in the west and Rohrauer Größtenberg in the east, the mountain range has a ridge-like character, which is only lost from the Rottalsattel, where the mountain range widens into a small plateau. An alpine Karen or Gruben (1300 m - 1500 m) landscape is formed in the broad crest landscape around the Hoher Nock and the Gamsplan (1700 m - 1900 m) and in the Karen or Gruben (1300 m - 1500 m), which descend southwestwards in a bowl shape. Between Rettenbacher Höhe and Koppenalm, the Knödelböden (also Knodelboden) form an elongated Uvala. The lower limit of the karren and doline phenomenon can generally be given as around 1200 m.

== Geology ==
=== Tectonic ===
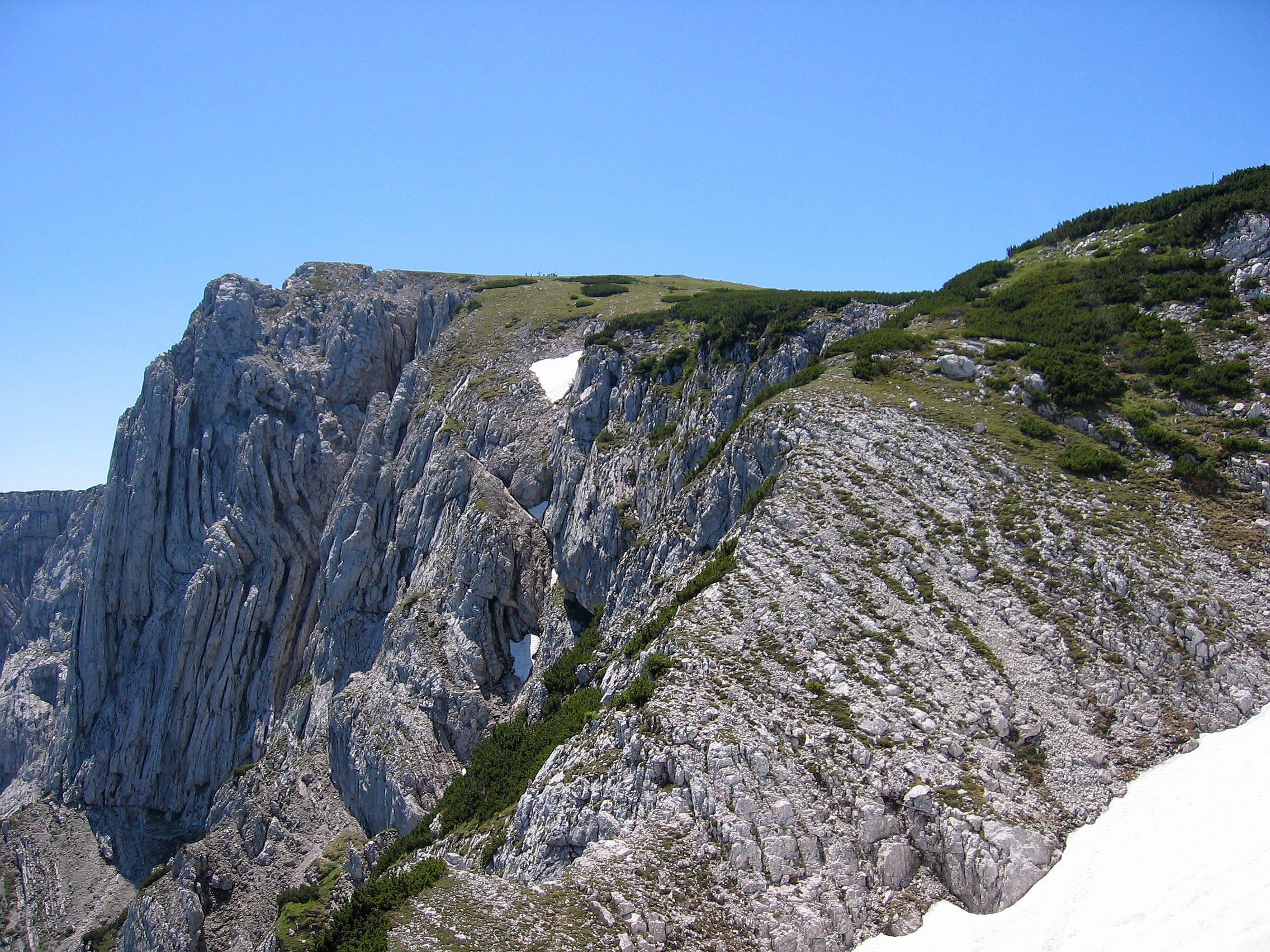
Vertical Wetterstein limestone of the Nockpfeil on the northern edge of the Sengsengebirge

Tectonics, the Sengsengebirge is a mighty, northward tilted (north-vergent) anticline of the Staufen-Höllengebirgs-Decke, which belongs to the Tyrolean cover unit (Tyrolian), whereby in the south the Hangendschenkel rises at an angle of between 30 and 40 degrees and gradually turns into a saigere to slightly overturned layer position up to the northern edge of the Sengsengebirgs. Immediately to the north is the boundary to the Reichraminger Decke of the Bajuvarian, which was partially overthrust during the Tyrolean thrust.

=== Lithostratigraphy ===
In its central part, the Höllengebirgsdecke consists almost exclusively of Wetterstein limestone, which was built up from the Anisian to the early Carnian of the Triassic around 247 to 235 million years ago. In contrast to the vertical Wetterstein limestone of the northern edge, where the top layers have flaked off, the lithostratigraphically original sequence of layers can be found at the foot of the mountain in the south. These are the Lunz Formation, Opponitz Formation and Main Dolomite. The main dolomite, which mainly forms the Reichraminger Decke, was deposited during the late Carnian and the Norium around 235 to 208 million years ago.

=== Former glaciation ===
The Sengsengebirge was partly glacierized during the Ice Ages, whereby the plateau around the Hoher Nock was ice-free and the Neogenee old landscape was preserved. However, glaciers formed on the northern flanks, the nutrient zone of which probably lay beneath the steep northern slopes between Schillereck, Hochsengs and Seehagelmauer and extended eastwards to below the Hoher Nock. It is assumed that during the High Glacial this "Sengsengebirgs glacier" extended in a western section at least as far as the valley floor of Hopfing. Corresponding moraine remains can be found above the ruined Mistleben alpine pasture, at the Feichtau lakes and on the Feichtau plateau. The moraine remains in the Hochkar below the Hoher Nock belong to an eastern section that flowed eastwards into the Blöttenbach valley. A small local glacier may have formed on the south side, which originated under the Schneeberg near the Hoher Nock, flowed in the cirque to the Koppenalm and further on via the Budergrabenkar towards the Rettenbach.

=== Hydrogeology ===
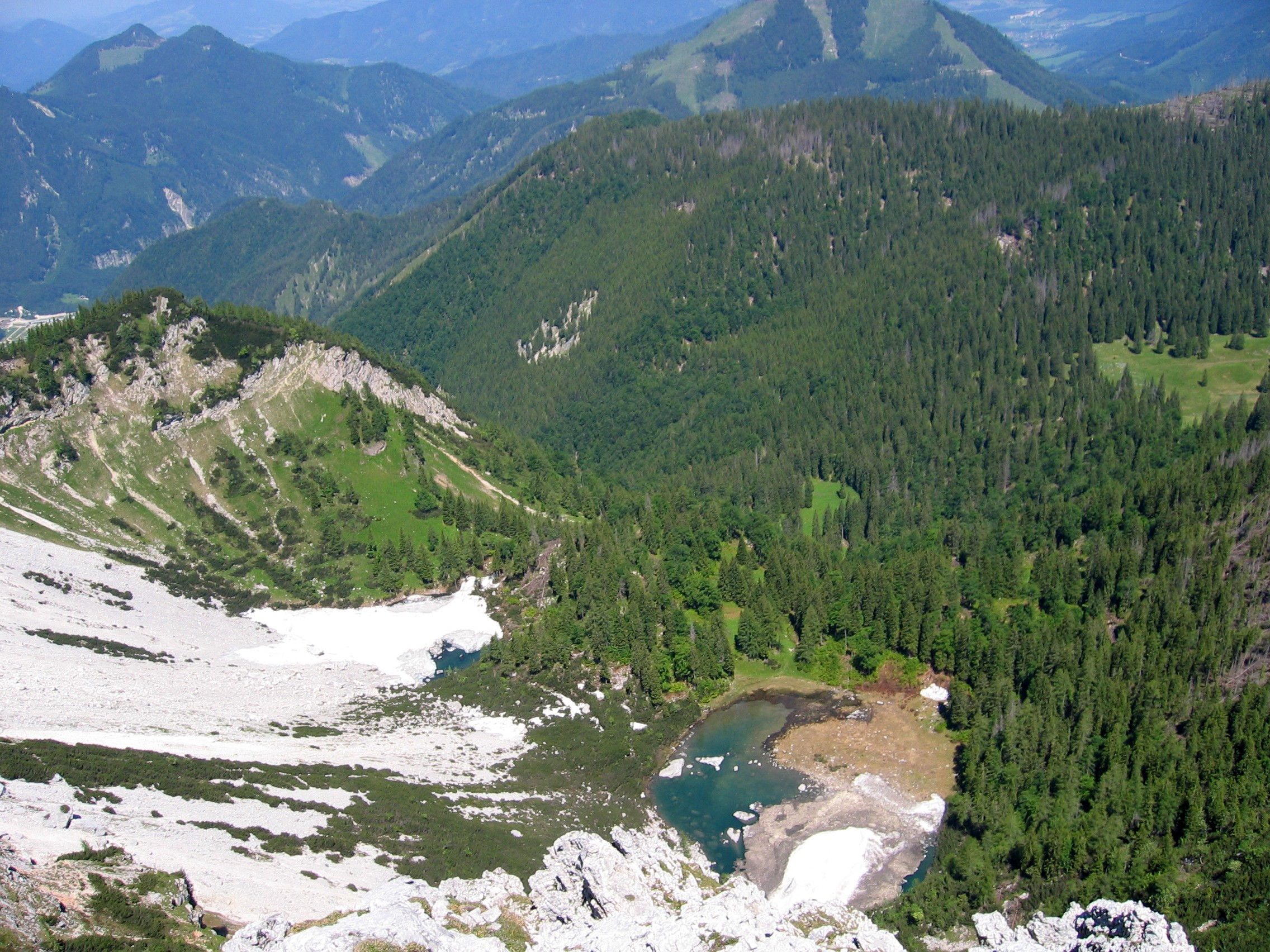
The Feichtau lakes are relics of the last ice age

The deep karstified Wetterstein limestone drains underground. There are therefore no lakes or streams in the higher areas. The drainage of the Karststock is mainly to the south via the two karst springs of Vorderem Rettenbach (Teufelskirche) with an average filling of 1028 l/s and Hinterem Rettenbach with an average fillingof 1100 l/s. At 1600 at, the Merkensteinbründl on the slope of the Gamsplan is the highest spring outlet in the Sengsengebirge. There are only a few small stillwaters in the Sengsengebirge, including the two Feichtau lakes at 1400 at altitude north below the Seehagelmauer. The smaller lake has neither inflow nor outflow and is classified as a Weiher. The larger of the two Feichtau lakes is fed by a watercourse at 1510 at and is fed by a perennial spring. The water of the two spring branches, which are strong for the altitude, probably comes from the Rauhwacke of the Lunz strata that form the walls here. To the east of the Feichtau lakes lies the Herzerlsee, a moorland lake.

=== Caves ===
The Wetterstein limestone, which is easy to karstify, offers favorable conditions for cave formation in combination with the remaining interface structure. As of 2019, 77 caves are listed in cadastral group 1651 (Sengsengebirge) of the Austrian Cave Register. Most cave entrances lie between a height of 1300 m to 1600 m They are mostly shaft-like caves, only a few have a pronounced horizontal extension. With a measured length of 31,086 m, the Klarahöhle (Cat.No. 1651/xx) is the longest cave in the Sengsengebirge and the eleventh longest cave in Austria. Below the Rettenbachhöhle (Cat.No. 1651/1), the so-called Teufelsloch, is the source of the Hintere Rettenbach. The ice chapel in the Steyreck (Cat. No. 1651/3) is also well known. With the Kraterschacht (Cat.No. 1651/24), there is also an important ice cave in the Sengsengebirge, whose huge cave ice deposits are the subject of scientific research.

== Climate ==
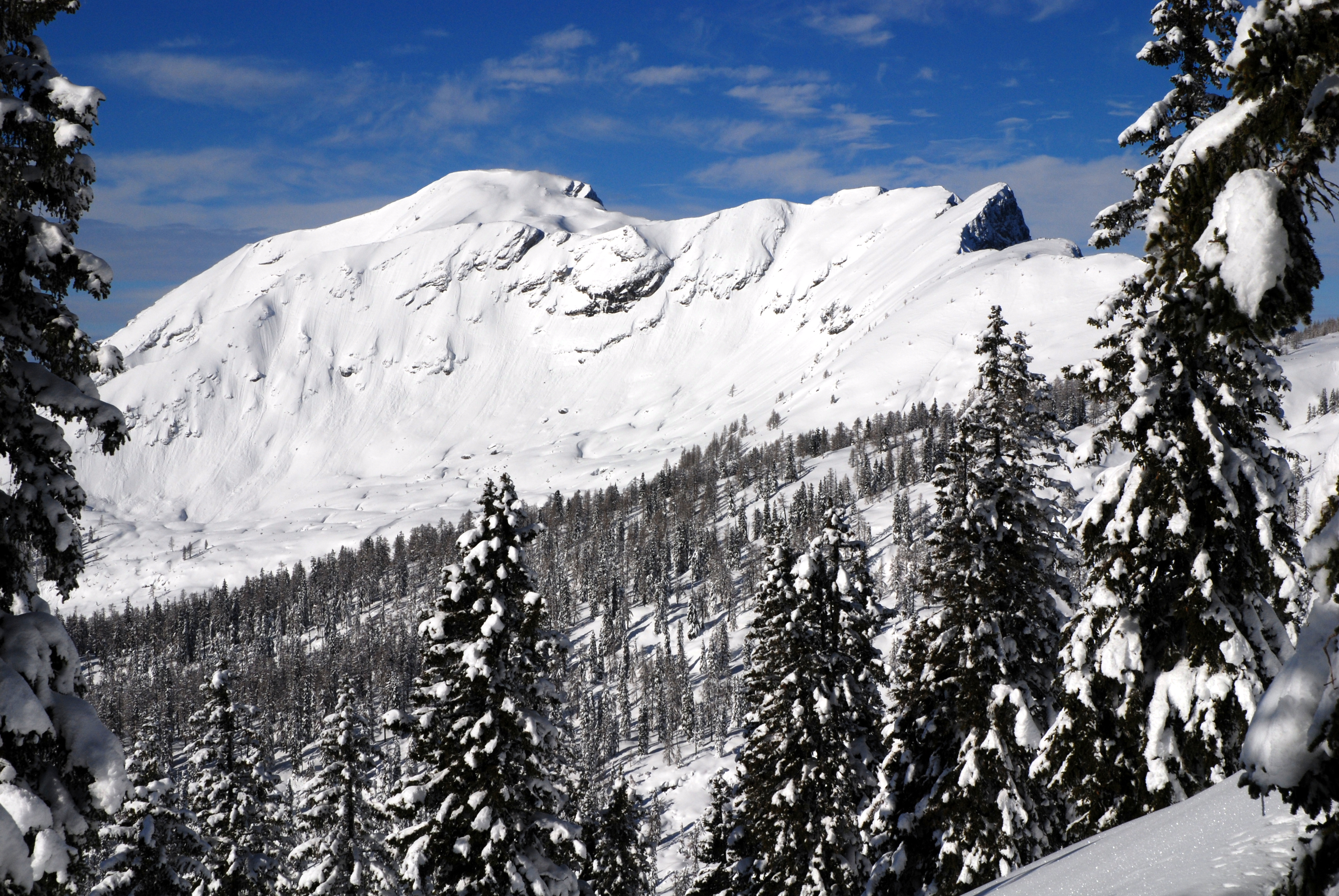
Snow-covered main ridge of the Sengsengebirge with Hoher Nock and Gamsplan in front (view from Mayrwipfl, January 2013)

As part of the research activities in the Kalkalpen National Park, around 43 climate stations have been set up since 1993. Some of these are located in the Sengsengebirge, such as the measuring stations on the Kogleralm (south side) and the Feichtaualm (north side). The climate data show a temperature and precipitation distribution typical for the mountains of the Northern Limestone Alps: cool summers with high precipitation and winters with low precipitation. Annual precipitation ranges from 1200 to almost 2100 mm, with precipitation increasing continuously with altitude. Maximum values are reached in the Rohrauer Größtenberg and Hoher Nock areas. In open, higher areas, westerly and north-westerly winds dominate, often accompanied by precipitation. Due to the frequent accumulation of clouds on the northern edge of the Limestone Alps, there is an above-average amount of snowfall for the altitude in the area of the main ridge above the Hopfingboden. On the Feichtaualm (1350 m), the snow cover can last an average of 174 days. are estimated. Snow depths of three meters are not uncommon. The south side often benefits from much better weather in north-facing conditions and also has less precipitation than the north side. The difference in altitude of around 1500 meters results in striking temperature differences between the valley locations and the summit regions of the Sengsengebirge. The average annual temperature at the southern foot is around 8.6 - 10.0 °C, while at the summit of the Hoher Nock the average annual temperature does not exceed 1 °C.

== Flora and vegetation ==
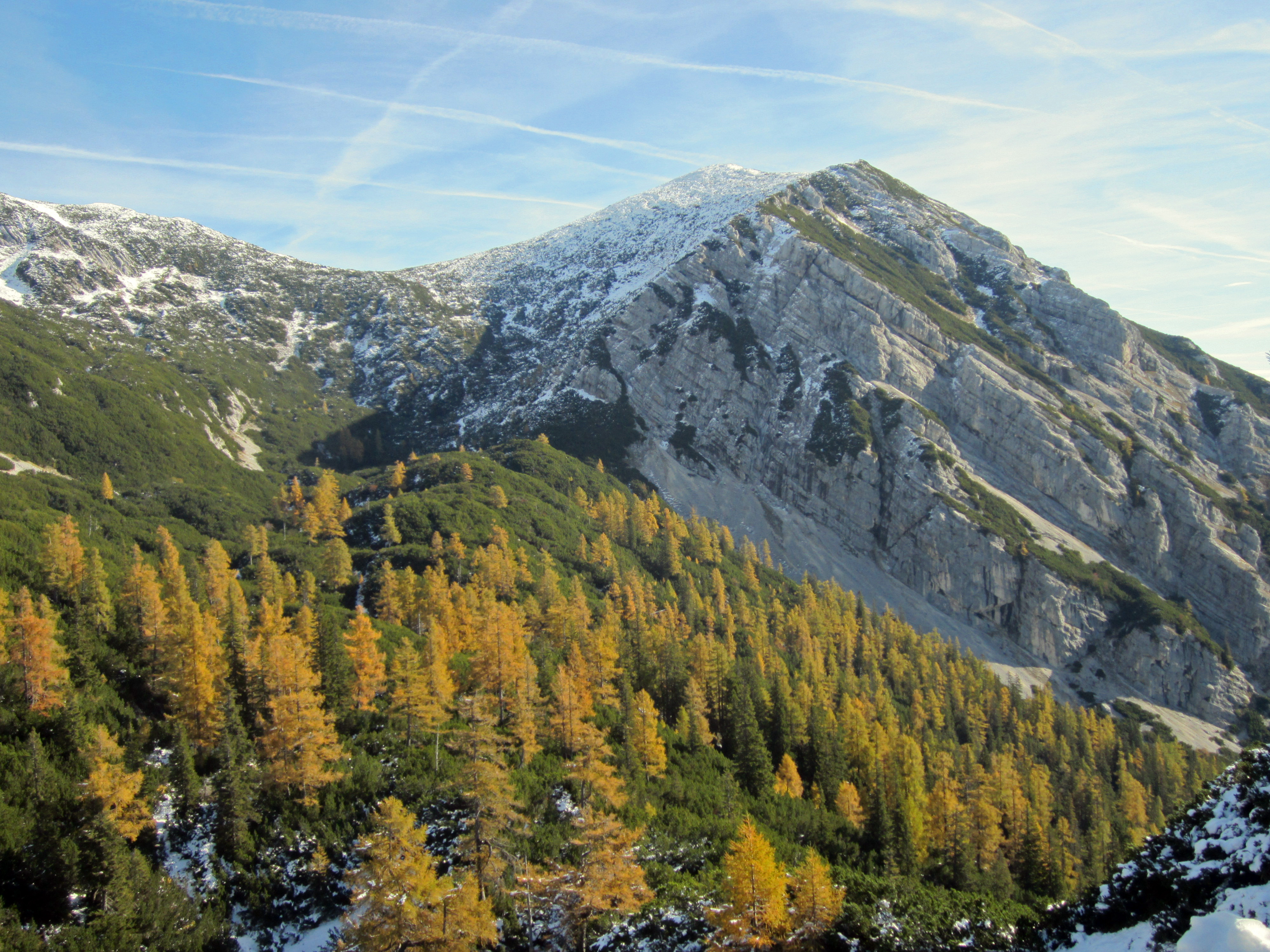
The larch forms the forest boundary. Above it extensive fields of mountain pine. In the background the Gamsplan, Sengsengebirge

The beech (Fagus sylvatica) accounts for about 30% of the area. It forms extensive areas, especially on the northern slope. The European larch (Larix decidua) characterizes the higher altitudes up to 1500m, where it forms the forest boundary. Depending on the location, there are also white firs (Abies alba), Scots pines (Pinus sylvestris), common ashs (Fraxinus excelsior) and mountain maples (Acer pseudoplatanus).the association of mountain pine (Pinus mugo) dominates the higher altitudes. On the southern slopes, it grows in ditches down to 600m, for example in the Schröcksteingraben. On the other hand, it climbs up to the summit region of the Hoher Nock, leaving only extreme rock and wind zones free. Alpine meadows form on wind-exposed and partially blown-off sites in winter, in which especially the Horst sedge (Carex sempervirens) and the calcareous bluegrass (Sesleria varia) dominate. To the north of the Großer Feichtausee lies a small spruce raised bog. There are two moors in the Mayralm area. The Eisboden is a Fersumpfungsmoor, the Vorderanger is a Verlandungsmoor. The Scheuchzers Wollgras, which is very rare in Upper Austria, grows in the Vorderanger (Eriophorum scheuchzeri) grows in the Vorderanger.

The majority of the endemic plant species of the north-eastern Alps grow in the Sengsen Mountains.

== Fauna ==
The Sengsengebirge is rich in game species. Roe deer (Capreolus capreolus), red deer (Cervus elaphus) and chamois (Rupicapra rupicapra) are present in significant populations; mountain hares (Lepus timidus) also live in the area. Of the carnivores (Carnivora), Eurasian lynx (Lynx lynx), stone marten (Martes foina) and pine marten (Martes martes) and red fox (Vulpes vulpes) are present. The brown bear (Ursus arctos) has not been detected since 2004.

Alpine choughs (Pyrrhocorax graculus) and ravens (Corvus corax) are frequently encountered. With Rock ptarmigan (Lagopus muta), Black grouse (Lyrurus tetrix), hazel grouse (Tetrastes bonasia) and capercaillie (Tetrao urogallus), four grouse species are native to the area. The Sengsengebirge is also the distribution area of the golden eagle (Aquila chrysaetos) with two to three breeding pairs. For the Alpine salamander (Salamandra atra), the alpine meadows above the tree line are important. Of the reptile species, adder (Vipera berus) and mountain lizard (Zootoca vivipara) are more widespread. The cave ground beetle Arctaphaenops muellneri, an endemic species of the Sengsen and Reichraminger Hintergebirge, has been found in the Rettenbachhöhle and the Klarahöhle.

== History ==
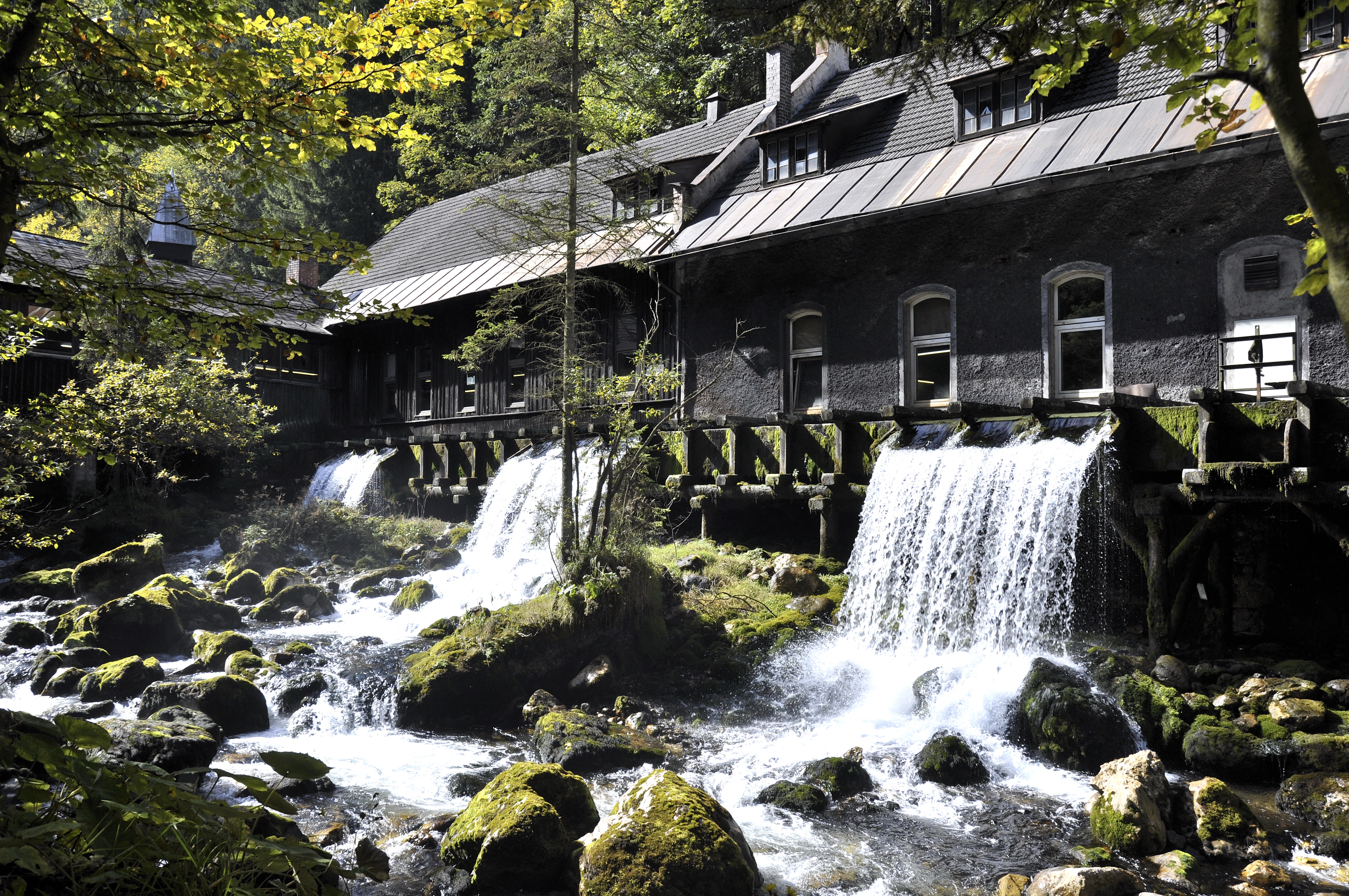
The Franz de Paul Schröckenfux scythe factory in Roßleithen was founded in 1540 and is one of the oldest industrial companies in Austria

The name Sengsengebirge is derived from the extensive use of its forests by the scythe forges that began in the Middle Ages. The mountain range was previously simply called Langer Berg. A number of scythe factories (guild in Kirchdorf an der Krems) were established in the area, of which only very few have survived today. In this context, the Eisenwurzen should be mentioned, where iron has been smelted and processed for 2500 years. The scythe works obtained the charcoal required for iron processing from the manorial forests and charcoal burning was an important branch of the farmers' livelihood. Every master scythe smith had dedicated woodlands and farmers who burned coal for him there. Two hundred years ago, around one in four farmers in the Krems, Steyr and Teichl valleys was a "coal farmer". In a letter of bequest from 1748, Franz Anton von Lamberg gave the master scythe smith on the Rossleithen, Wolf Leopold Schreckenfux, a woodland on the "inner Grestenberg and Steyreck" for use. The manorial forests were therefore "lent" to the iron-processing companies. The duration of such a lease or "loan" was often not limited in time.

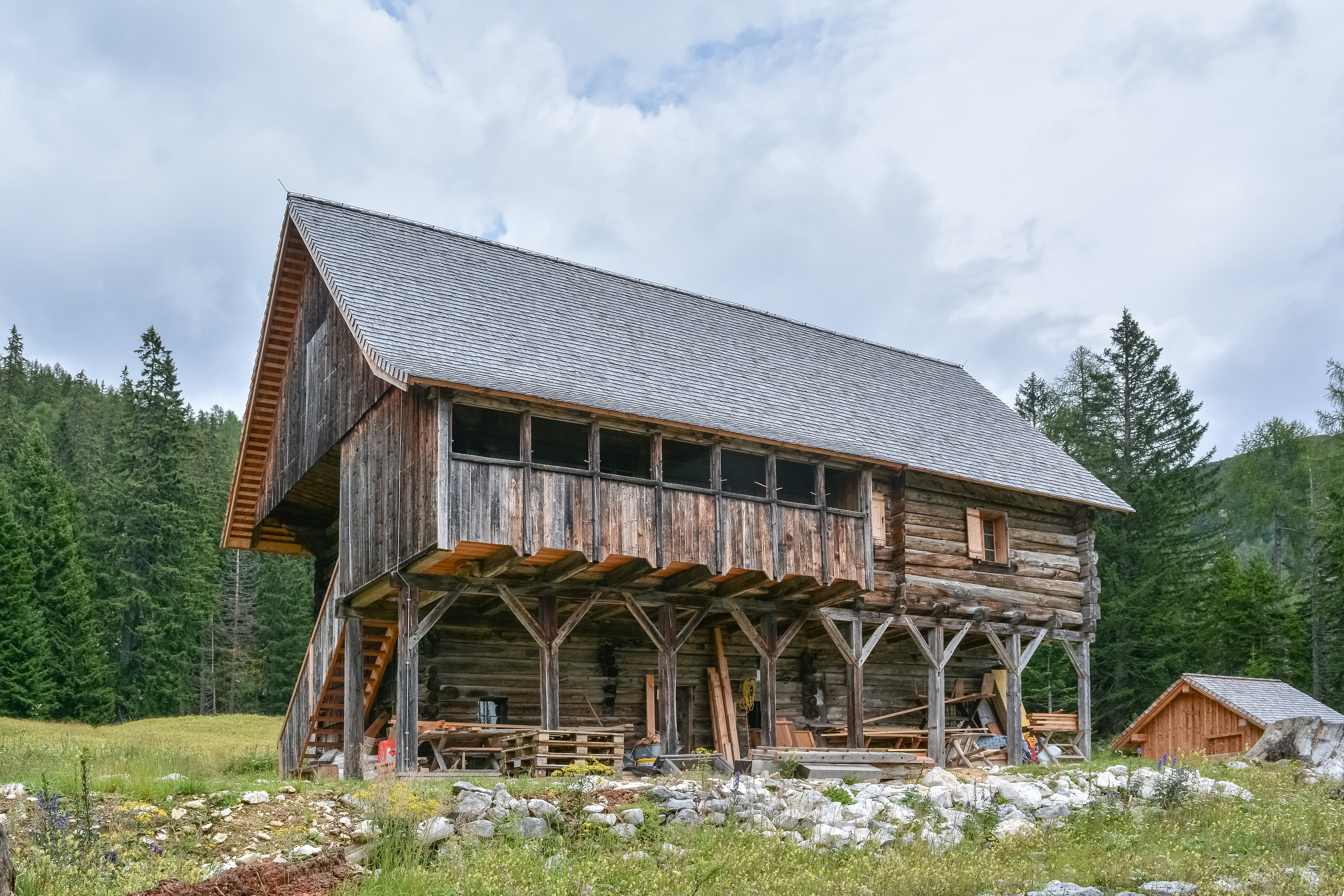
The hunting lodge in Bärnriedlau is over 300 years old and is a listed building

In 1666, Reichsgraf Johann Maximilian von Lamberg acquired the area together with the Herrschaft Steyr from Emperor Leopold I Subsequently, large parts of the area were used exclusively as hunting grounds and the count's personal preserve for the Lamberg family. Apart from the cultivation of the alpine pastures and the count's hunt, any use or alteration was prohibited. It was only after the death of Franz Emerich von Lamberg that the hunting grounds were leased out several times. The most famous tenant was Franz Ferdinand of Austria-Este. The Bärnriedlau was one of the most important bases for the great manorial hunts. The hut was revitalized and extended in 1901. Riding paths were built for access.

In 1938, Vollrath Raimund von Lamberg sold the entire property of the Lamberg estate to the German Reich for 3.1 million Reichsmark. With the Austrian State Treaty of 1955, former German property and thus also the Lamberg estate and the majority of the Sengsengebirge mountains became the property of the Republic of Austria. The legal dispute over the Restitution Claim of Count Lamberg was ended in 1961 with a settlement and the payment of 800,000 schilling to his heir. Since then, most of the Sengsengebirge has been managed by the Austrian Federal Forests.

=== Poaching ===
On October 29, 1923, a clash took place on the Mayralm between hunters, gendarmes and poachers, during which the 33 year-old hunter Vinzenz Hobel and the poacher Johann Farnberger, vulgo Sperl Hans, were shot dead. The hunter's cross, an inscription on a large stone, on the Mayralm commemorates this event. In St. Pankraz there has been a poaching museum since 2000, whose holdings were transferred to the redesigned Wilderer Museum in Molln in 2022.

=== Alpine farming ===
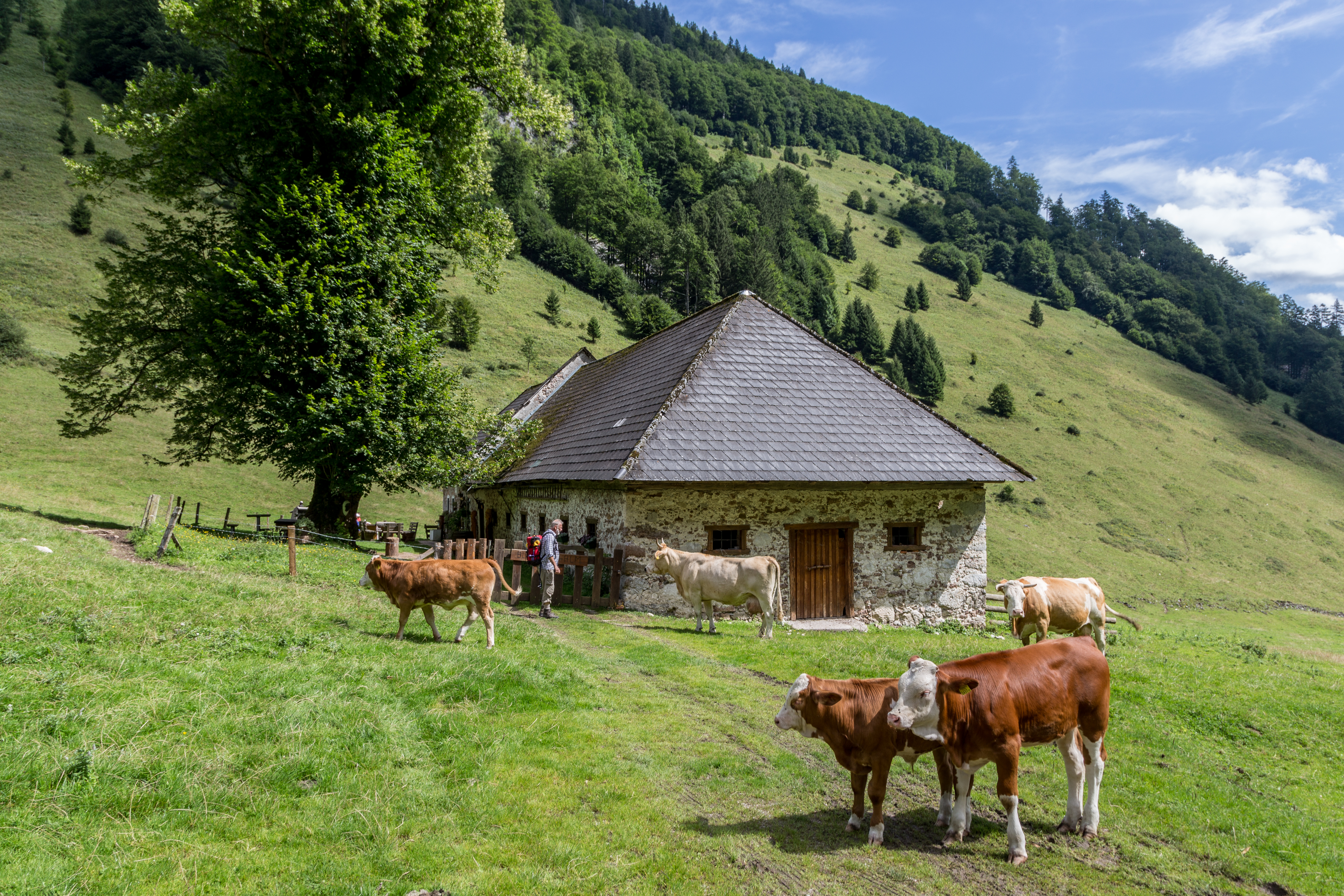
Grazing cattle on the Blumauer Alm

A large number of Almen were used for alpine farming, the importance of which declined sharply in the 19th century. Field names such as Haidenalm and Kühböden indicate that they were more widespread at the time, and numerous foundation walls of ruined huts are reminders of this. In the area of the large hollows between 1,200 m above sea level (AA) and 1,400 m above sea level (AA), on the south side of the Sengsengebirge, there were nine mountain pastures until 1862: Kaltwasser, Fotzen, Pernkopf, Kogler, Brettstein, Bärnriedelau, Koppen, Rettenbach-Hüttstatt, Gyrer (Gierer). Grazing records show that until 1862 there were grazing rights for 200 horned cattle, 220 sheep and 90 goats in this area. These numbers were generally reduced during the regulations in 1862 and in 1882 grazing rights for at least 108 horned cattle, 90 sheep and 70 goats were replaced. Due to the number of livestock being too high for the natural balance, the alpine pastures showed signs of degeneration, including karstification. The water supply became increasingly difficult and the upwelling numbers fell. The large alpine pastures still in use today (2023) include the Feichtaualm and the Blumauer Alm in the northern Sengsengebirge and the Rumpelmayr Reit at the eastern end of the mountain range. The servitude right for the Feichtaualm comprises 95 hectares of pastureland with a right to drive 104 horned cattle.

== Settlements and agriculture ==
Only small settlements have been established in the Sengsen Mountains. Permanently inhabited settlements are located at the southern foot of the mountains. From west to east these are: Pernkopf, Spering, Koppen and Rißriegl. As settlement areas and pastures, these clearing islands are the main agricultural areas. In the Rißriegler area, sheep are herded in the forest pasture. Further open meadow areas are located in the south-east of the municipality of St. Pankraz (Rohrauer Fichten, Saubachgut and Rohraugut) and the Spannriegl in the municipality of Roßleithen.

== Mountain sports ==
=== Hiking ===
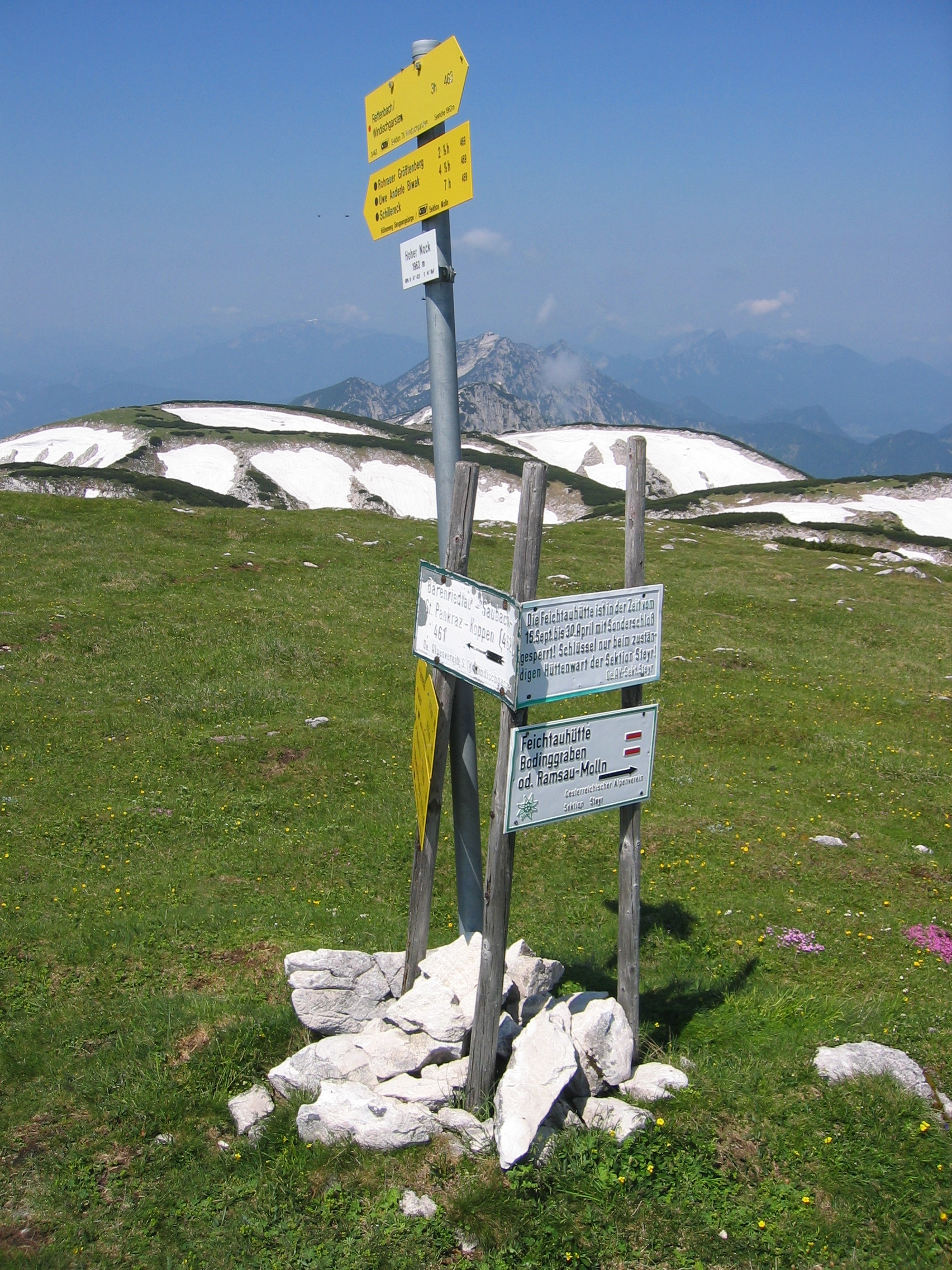
Signpost on the Hoher Nock, view across the plateau to the west

The Sengsengebirge was opened up to tourism in 1921 with the lease of the Feichtauhütte by the Steyr section of the Alpine Club. The Hohe Nock became a popular mountain destination, while the other peaks were rarely visited. This only changed in the 1970s with the construction of the Sengsengebirgs-Höhenweg, which opened up the western section of the Sengsengebirge. In 1976, the Uwe-Anderle-Biwak was built between Hochsengs and Gamskogel at 1583 m (Hochsengs bivouac) of the Molln-Steyrtal section.

The marked and signposted trail network in the Sengsengebirge is maintained by the Austrian Alpine Club. The Sengsengebirgs-Höhenweg crosses the mountain range from east to west. This trail bears the number 469 and leads over the peaks Schillereck, Hochsengs, Gamskogel, Rohrauer Größtenberg and Hoher Nock, where it reaches its highest point. There are ascents to the mountains on the north and south sides. The best known are

- Trail 460: From the Speringbauer to the saddle Auf der Huttn (radio station) below the Spering
- Trail 461: From St. Pankraz via the Bärenriedlau to the Hoher Nock
- Trail 463: Budergrabensteig, from Hinterer Rettenbach to Hoher Nock
- Trail 465: From the Klauser reservoir to the Spering
- Trail 466: From the Feichtau to the Hoher Nock

There are no serviced bases along the high-altitude trail. Overnight accommodation is available in the bivouac at the radio station below the Spering and in the Uwe Anderle bivouac. North of the Feichtau lakes is the Feichtauhütte, a self-catering hut run by the Alpine Club. Nearby is the privately managed Polzhütte. There are no marked trails in the area east of the Hoher Nock.

=== Winter sports ===
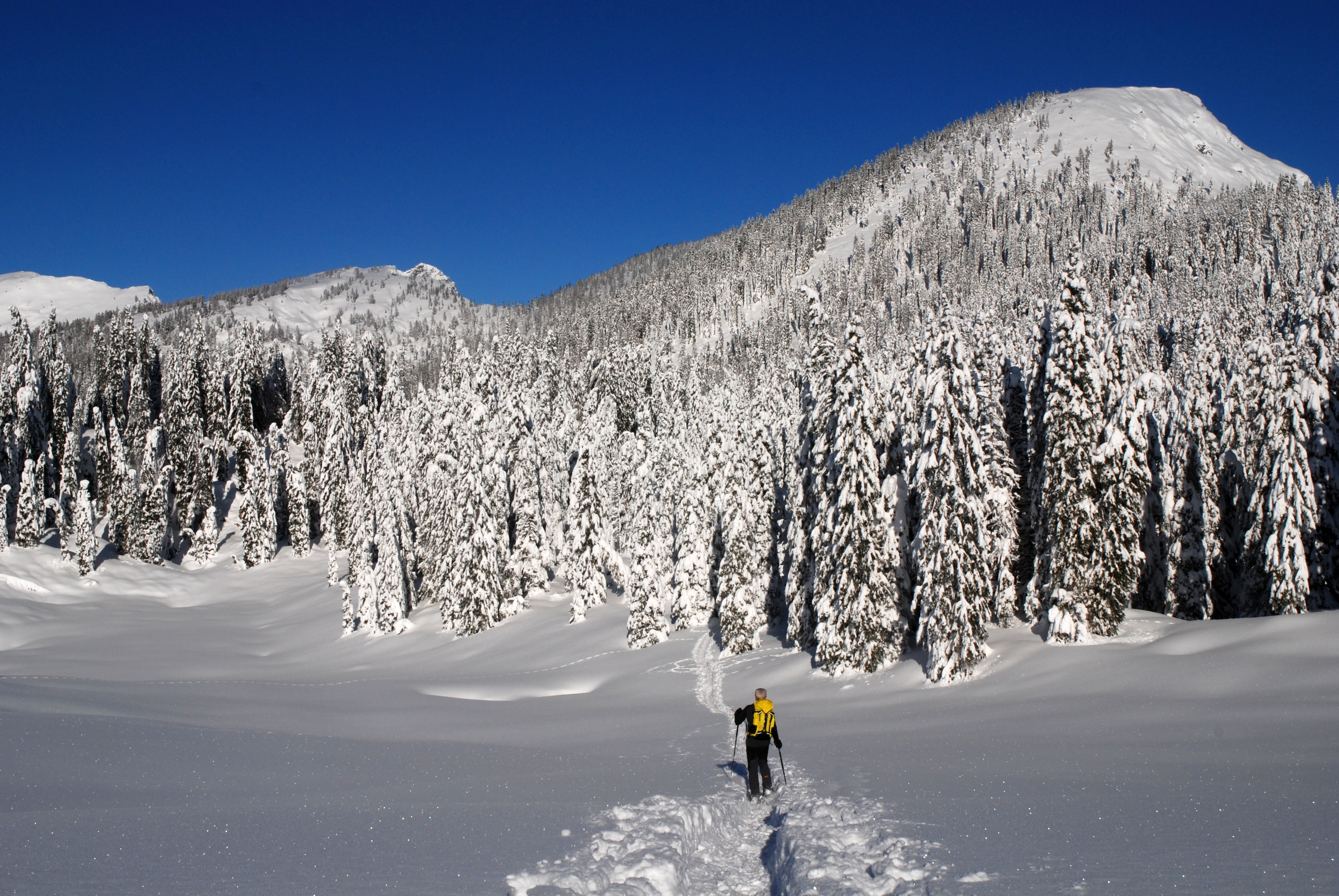
Snowshoe hike to the Mayrwipfl

The Sengsengebirge is also suitable for snowshoe and ski tours. Well-known ski tours that are marked on the maps include:

- Trail 463: Budergrabensteig, from Hinterer Rettenbach to Hoher Nock
- From the Koppengut over the Brettstein to the Rohrauer Größtenberg
- From the Haslersgatter via the Mayralm to the Mayrwipfl

=== Alpinism ===
In contrast to other more spectacular mountain groups, the technical climbing development only began late, around 1910. Franz Tham and Adam Döppl in particular achieved difficult first ascents on the north side of the Hoher Nock during this time. Today, there are several climbing routes on the Nockpfeiler in the north and on the Nockplatte in the south up to Difficulty level V.

== Nature conservation ==
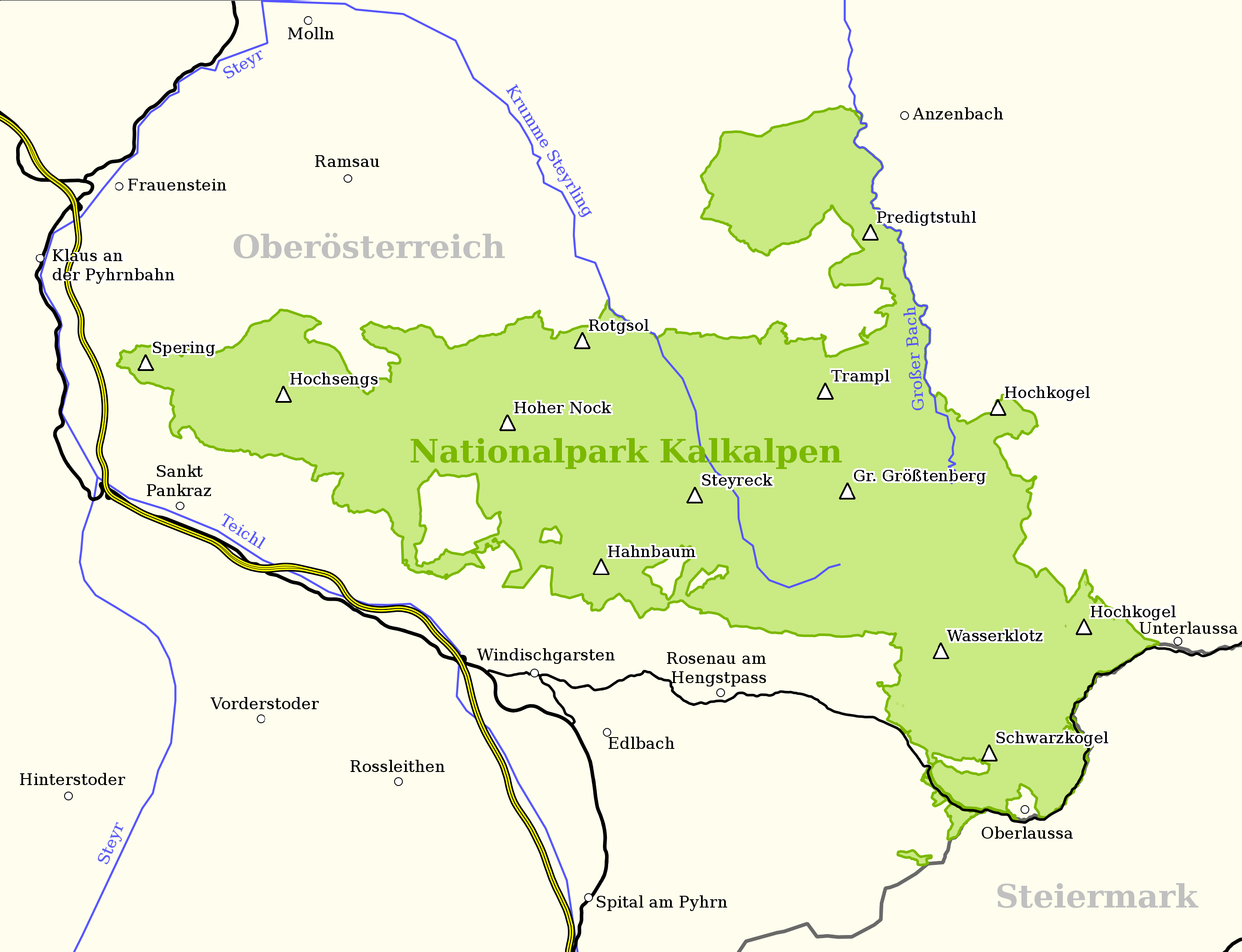
Overview map Kalkalpen National Park

In 1976, the central parts around the narrower karst massif covering 3400 hectares were designated as the Sengsengebirge Nature Reserve, which was incorporated in its entirety into the Kalkalpen National Park in 1997. Today, with the exception of the southern and western edges, the entire mountain range is part of the protected area. The clearing island of Rießriegl above the Hinteres Rettenbachtal valley is permanently inhabited and is excluded from the national park area. The European protected area Kalkalpen National Park, 1st ordinance section, slightly larger than the national park itself, was nominated as part of the Natura 2000 network in accordance with Directive 92/43/EEC (Fauna-Flora-Habitat Directive) and Birds Directive. Furthermore, the area of the original national park was also designated as a Ramsar site.

== Reception ==
=== Numismatics ===
The main ridge of the Sengsen Mountains is depicted on the 50 euro gold coin "In the Deepest Forest" from the "Natural Treasure Alps" series. It was issued on February 17, 2021 in a mintage of 20,000 pieces.

=== Say ===
The origin of the Feichtau lakes is mentioned in a legend.

An the Feuchtaueralm in the Sengsengebirge mountains lived a high-spirited dairymaid. One day she had to go in search of some lost cattle. She took a break under the so-called "Haltersitz", milk bucket in hand, and cursed her troubles and complaints. A storm came up and a bolt of lightning killed the dairymaid. The milk bucket had also disappeared. Since then, two lakes have welled up between the bare stone fields. If the milk bucket reappears due to the rising tide, doomsday is not far off. According to another tale, the milk buckets are said to come to light in the Wunderloch, a small pond near Molln, which is said to be immeasurably deep.

— Oberösterreichisches Sagenbuch, sagen.at

== Literature ==
- Amt der Oö. Landesregierung, Nature Conservation Department (ed.): Raumeinheit Sengsengebirge (= Natur und Landschaft. Leitbilder für Oberösterreich. Band 15). Linz 2007 (zobodat.at [PDF; 4.3 MB; retrieved on November 18, 2021]).
- Wolfgang Heitzmann, Otto Harant (1996), Oberösterreichische Voralpen. Ein ÖAV Führer durch die Berge südlich von Linz, Wels uns Steyr. (3 ed.), Steyr: Ennsthaler Verlag
- Josef Lueger, Andreas Gärtner, Harald Haseke, Roswitha Schrutka, Norbert Steinwender: Atlas der Geologie M 1:20.000 des Nationalpark Kalkalpen – 1. Verordnungsabschnitt. Edited by: Amt der oö Landesregierung, Nationalparkplanung im Verein Nationalpark Kalkalpen. Linz 1994 (kalkalpen.at [PDF; 26.4 MB; accessed January 7, 2019]).
- Helene Bachmann: Die submontanen und montanen Waldgesellschaften des Sengsengebirges in Oberösterreich. Ed.: Office of the Upper Austrian Provincial Government, National Park Planning in the Kalkalpen National Park Association. Linz 1990 (kalkalpen.at [PDF; 26.4 MB; accessed January 7, 2019]).
