= Northern Limestone Alps =

Ranges of the Eastern Alps north of the Central Eastern Alps

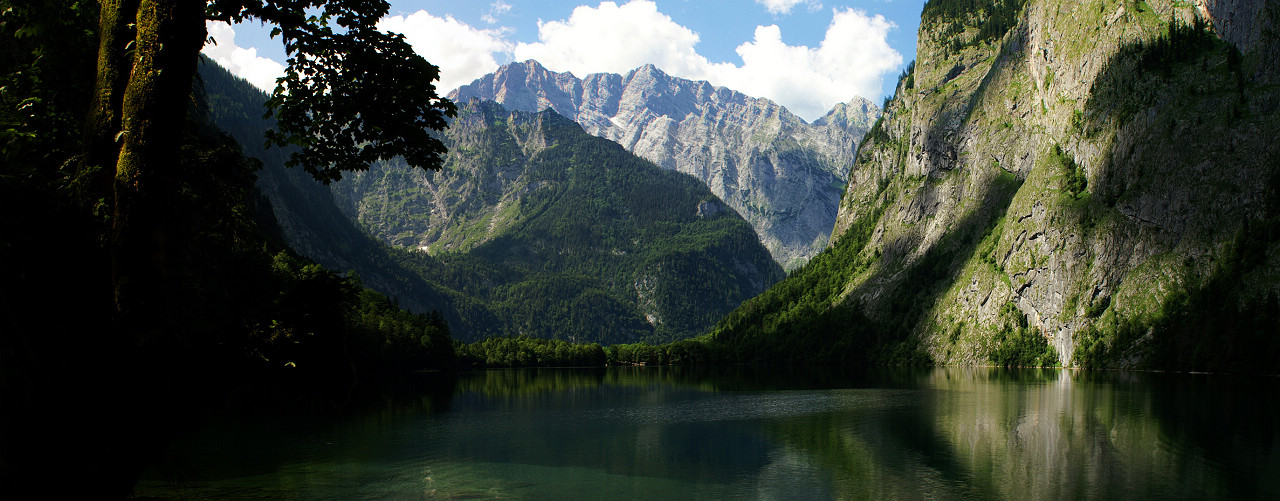
- Königssee Obersee near Berchtesgaden

Highest point
- Peak: Parseierspitze
- Elevation: 3,036 m (9,961 ft)
- Coordinates: 47°10′28″N 10°28′42″E

Geography
- Countries: Austria; Germany
- States: Vienna; Lower Austria; Styria; Upper Austria; Salzburg; Tyrol; Vorarlberg; Bavaria
- Range coordinates: 47°20.5′N 14°13.3′E
- Parent range: Eastern Alps

Geology
- Rock ages: Permian; Jurassic
- Rock types: Limestone; dolomite

The Northern Limestone Alps (German: Nördliche Kalkalpen), also called the Northern Calcareous Alps, are the ranges of the Eastern Alps north of the Central Eastern Alps located in Austria and the adjacent Bavarian lands of southeastern Germany. The distinction from the latter group, where the higher peaks are located, is based on differences in geological composition.

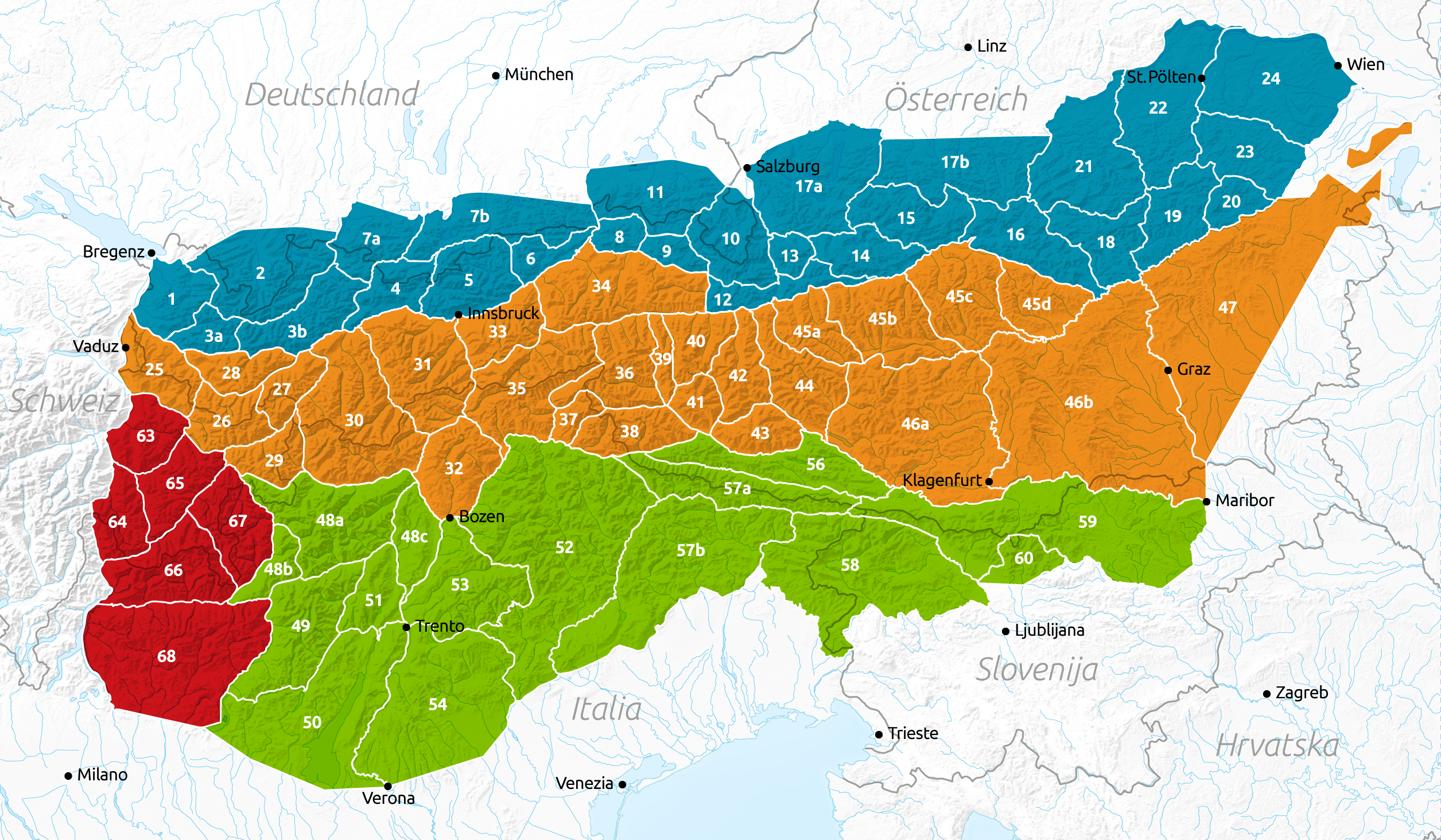
AVE classification of the Eastern Alps: Northern Limestone Alps Central Eastern Alps Southern Limestone Alps Western Limestone Alps

== Geography ==
If viewed on a west–east axis, the Northern Limestone Alps extend from the Rhine valley and the Bregenz Forest in Vorarlberg, Austria in the west extending along the border between the German federal-state of Bavaria and Austrian Tyrol, through Salzburg, Upper Austria, Styria and Lower Austria and finally ending at the Wienerwald at the city-limits of Vienna in the east.

The highest peaks in the Northern Limestone Alps are the Parseierspitze (3,036 metres (9,961 ft)) in the Lechtal Alps, and the Hoher Dachstein (2,996 metres (9,829 ft)). Other notable peaks in this range include the Zugspitze, (2,962 metres (9,718 ft)), located on the German-Austrian frontier and listed as the highest peak in Germany.

== Alpine Club classification ==
Ranges of the Northern Limestone Alps according to the Alpine Club classification of the Eastern Alps (from east to west):

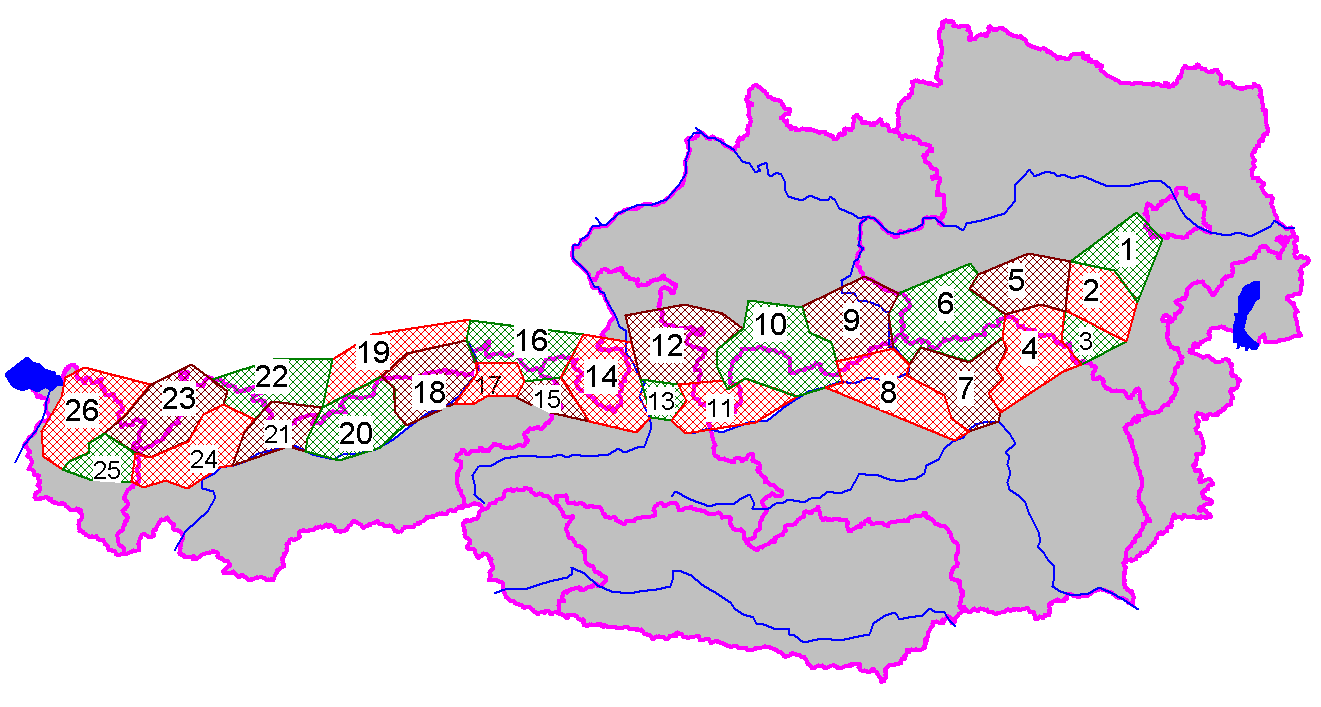
Groups of the Northern Limestone Alps (purple lines showing international borders and the borders of Austrian states)

- Vienna Woods (1)
- Gutenstein Alps (2)
- Rax and Schneeberg (3)
- Mürzsteg Alps (Schneealpe) (4)
- Türnitz Alps (5)
- Ybbstal Alps (6)
- Hochschwab (7)
- Ennstal Alps (including Gesäuse) (8)
- Upper Austrian Prealps (9)
- Totes Gebirge (10)
- Dachstein Mountains (11)
- Salzkammergut Mountains (12)
- Tennen Mountains (13)
- Berchtesgaden Alps (14)
- Lofer and Leogang Mountains (15)
- Chiemgau Alps (16)
- Kaiser Mountains (17)
- Brandenberg Alps (18)
- Bavarian Prealps (19)
- Karwendel (20)
- Wetterstein and Mieming Range (21)
- Ammergau Alps (22)
- Allgäu Alps (23)
- Lechtal Alps (24)
- Lechquellen Mountains (25)
- Bregenz Forest Mountains (26)

== See also ==
- Limestone Alps
- Southern Limestone Alps
- Geography of the Alps
- Sengsengebirge mountains
