= Styrian Seeberg Pass =

- Location within Alps
- Elevation: 1,253 metres (4,111 ft)

Third Approach
- Location: Austria
- Range: Alps
- Coordinates: 47°37′N 15°16′E

Styrian Seeberg Pass (also the Aflenzer Seeberg) (el. 1253 m.) is a high mountain pass in the Austrian Alps, located in the Bundesland of Styria, east of the Hochschwab Mountains. The pass forms the most important connection between the Mürz Valley at Kapfenberg and the pilgrimage destination of Mariazell (as well as neighboring Lower Austria). At the same time, it forms the division between the watersheds of the Mur and the Enns.

The Styrian Seeberg's name serves to differentiate from Seeberg Saddle on the border between Carinthia and Slovenia, which is also called the Carinthian Seeberg.

== See also ==
- List of highest paved roads in Europe
- List of mountain passes
