= Erlauf (river) =

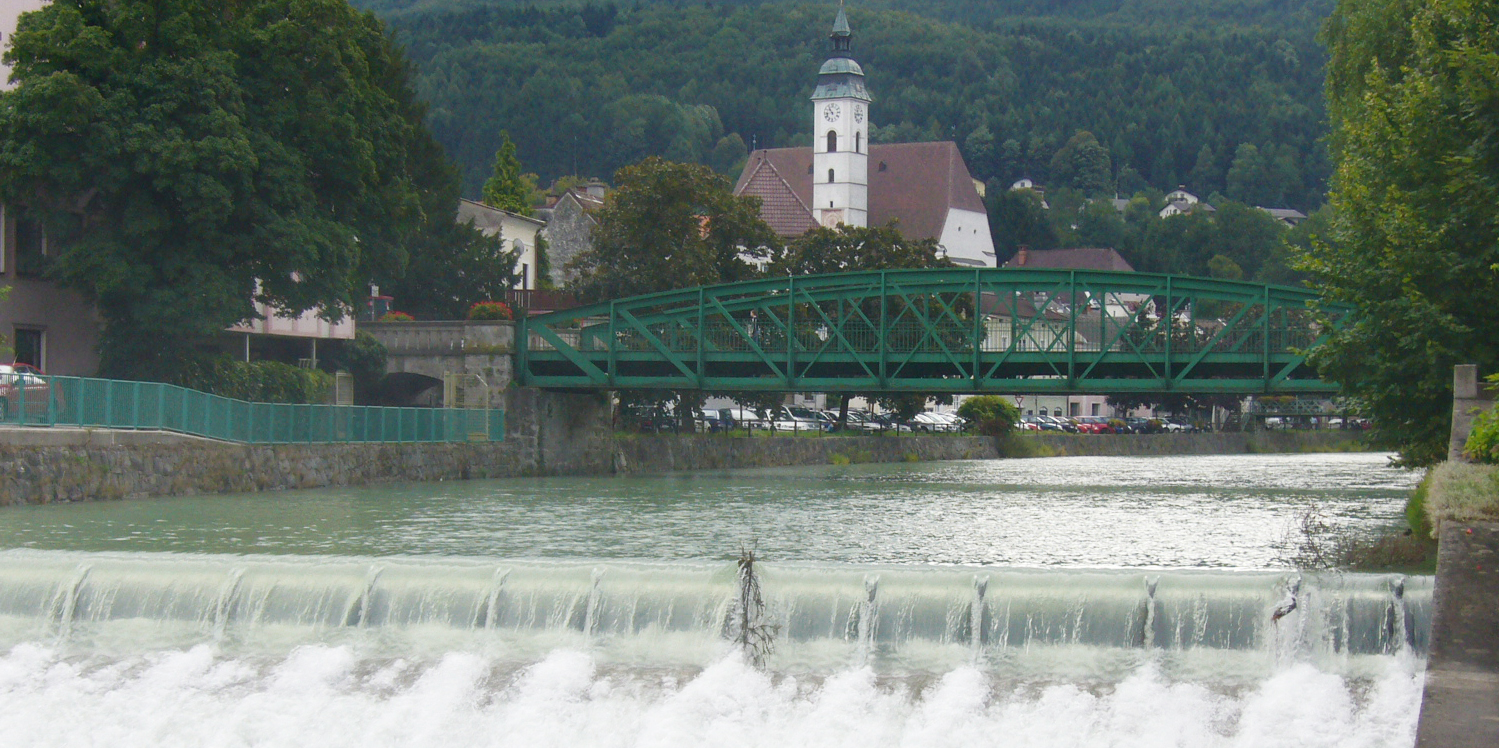
- The Erlauf at Scheibbs

Location
- Country: Austria
- States: Lower Austria and Styria

Physical characteristics
- Source
  - location: at the foot of the Gemeindealpe
  - coordinates: 47.8076°N 15.2299°E
- Mouth
  - location: at Pöchlarn into the Danube
  - coordinates: 48.2134°N 15.1943°E
- Basin size: 632 km^{2} (244 sq mi)

Basin features
- Progression: Danube→ Black Sea

Erlauf is a river of Lower Austria and of Styria, Austria. Its drainage basin is 632 km^{2} (244 sq mi).

The Erlauf springs at the foot of the mountain Gemeindealpe It is a right tributary of the Danube in Pöchlarn.
