= Mürz =

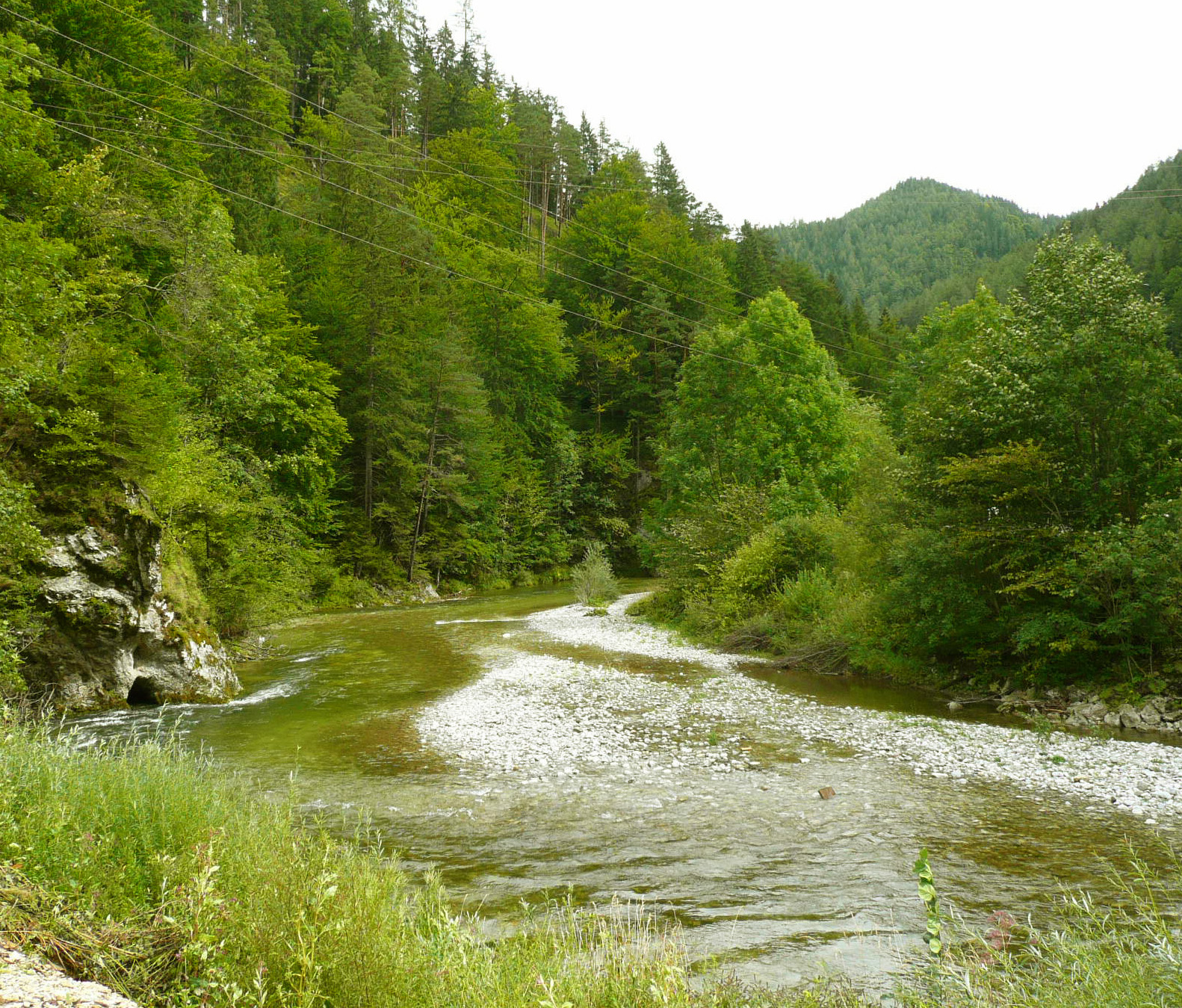
- The Mürz between Mürzsteg and Neuberg

Location
- Country: Austria
- State: Styria

Physical characteristics
- Source
  - location: confluence of the Stille Mürz and Kalte Mürz near Kaltenbach, Neuberg
  - coordinates: 47.7530°N 15.5085°E
- Mouth
  - location: Bruck an der Mur
  - coordinates: 47.4099°N 15.2752°E
- Length: 84.4 km (52.4 mi)
- Basin size: 1,505 km^{2} (581 sq mi)
- Discharge
  - average: 20 m^{3}/s (710 cu ft/s)

Basin features
- Progression: Mur→ Drava→ Danube→ Black Sea

The Mürz (German pronunciation: [mʏʁt͡s]) is a river in Styria, Austria, with a length of 84 km (52 mi). Its drainage basin is 1,505 km^{2} (581 sq mi).

The Mürz begins at the confluence of the Stille Mürz and Kalte Mürz near Kaltenbach, Neuberg and the border to Lower Austria. It passes through Mürzzuschlag. Along its course are the tracks of the Southern Railway as well as the highway Semmering Schnellstraße. The Mürz discharges into the Mur in Bruck an der Mur.
