= Rax (mountain range) =

Mountain range in Austria

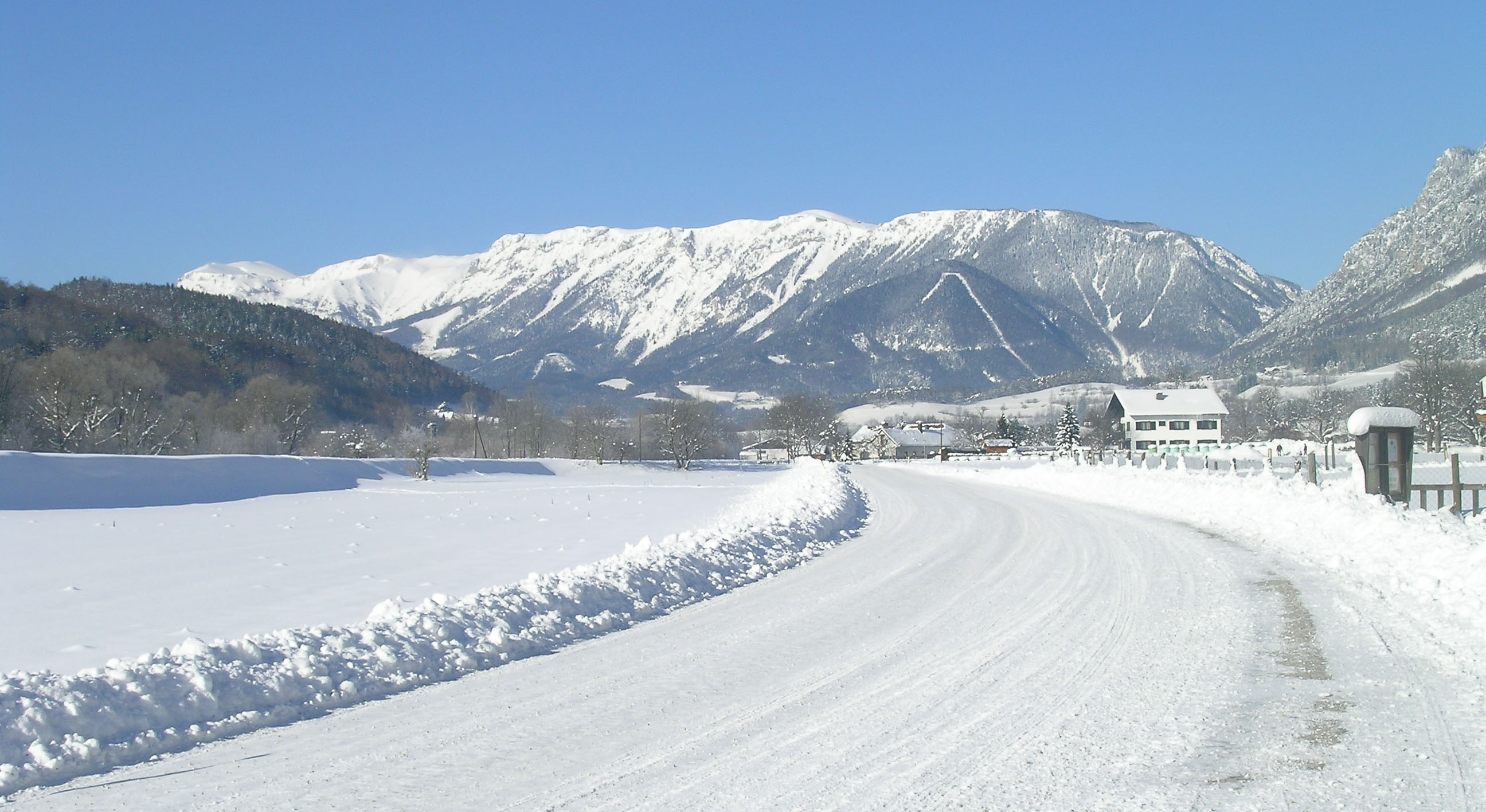
- Rax in winter

Highest point
- Peak: Heukuppe
- Elevation: 2,007 m (6,585 ft)
- Coordinates: 48°5′14″N 15°54′43″E

Geography
- Country: Austria
- States: Lower Austria; Styria
- Range coordinates: 47°41.35′N 15°41.3′E
- Parent range: Northern Limestone Alps

The Rax is a mountain range in the Northern Limestone Alps on the border of the Austrian federal provinces of Lower Austria and Styria. Its highest peak is the Heukuppe (2,007 m). The Rax, together with the nearby Schneeberg, are a traditional mountaineering and mountain walking area, and are called the Wiener Hausberge (Vienna's local mountains). They are separated by the deep Höllental ("Hell Valley").

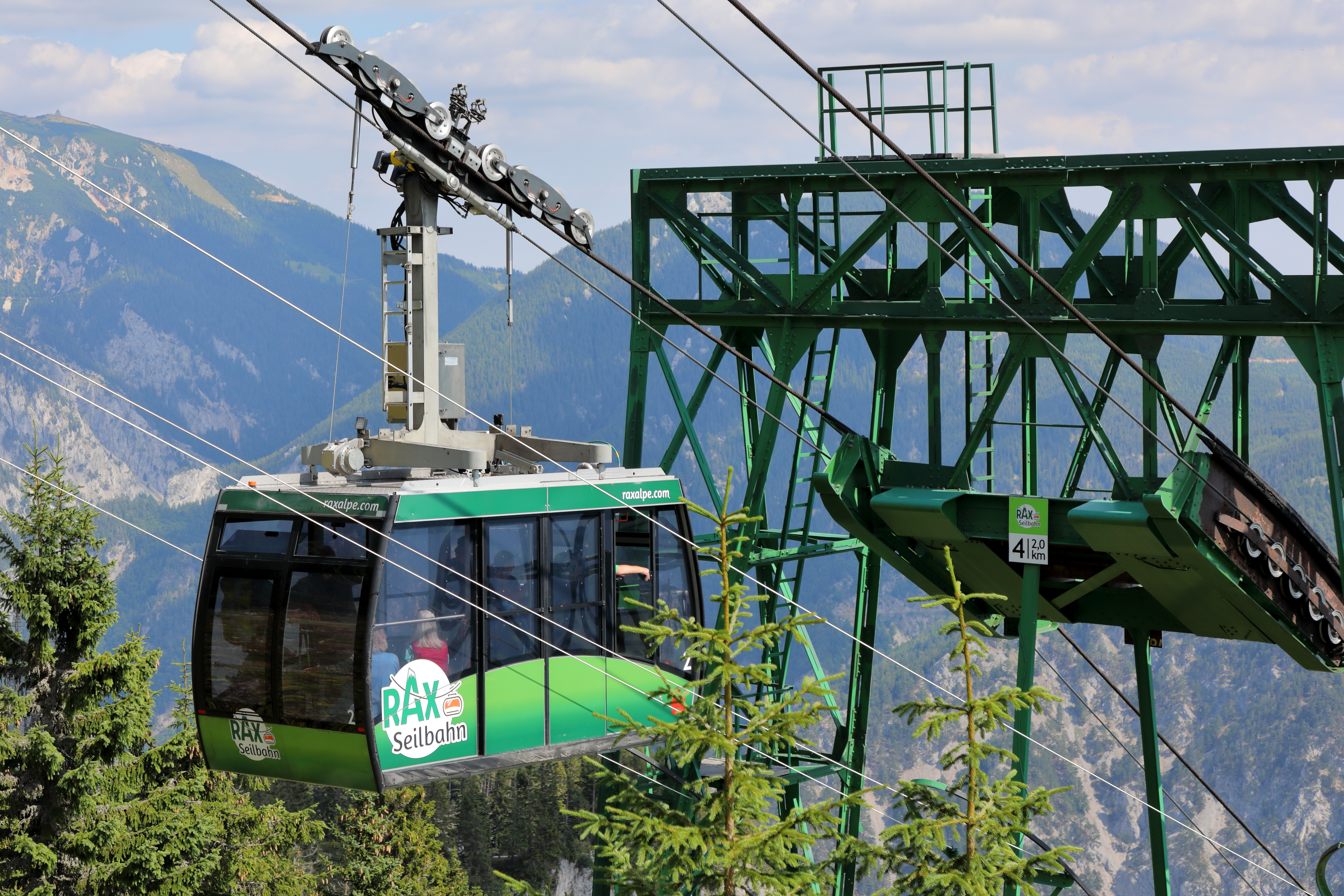
Cable car "Rax-Seilbahn“

A cable car, the Raxseilbahn, starting at Hirschwang at the north-eastern foot of the mountains and the first in Austria (construction began in 1925), takes visitors to the extensive, high plateau of the Rax at a height of about 1,500 m. This area is a particular favourite with hikers from Lower Austria and Vienna. The steep sides of the plateau offer climbing tours of various difficulty. These steige (mountain trails) and the hütten, alpine huts offering basic accommodation, were built and are maintained kept by various Austrian Alpine Clubs. They were erected in the late 19th and early 20th century.

== Mountain huts ==
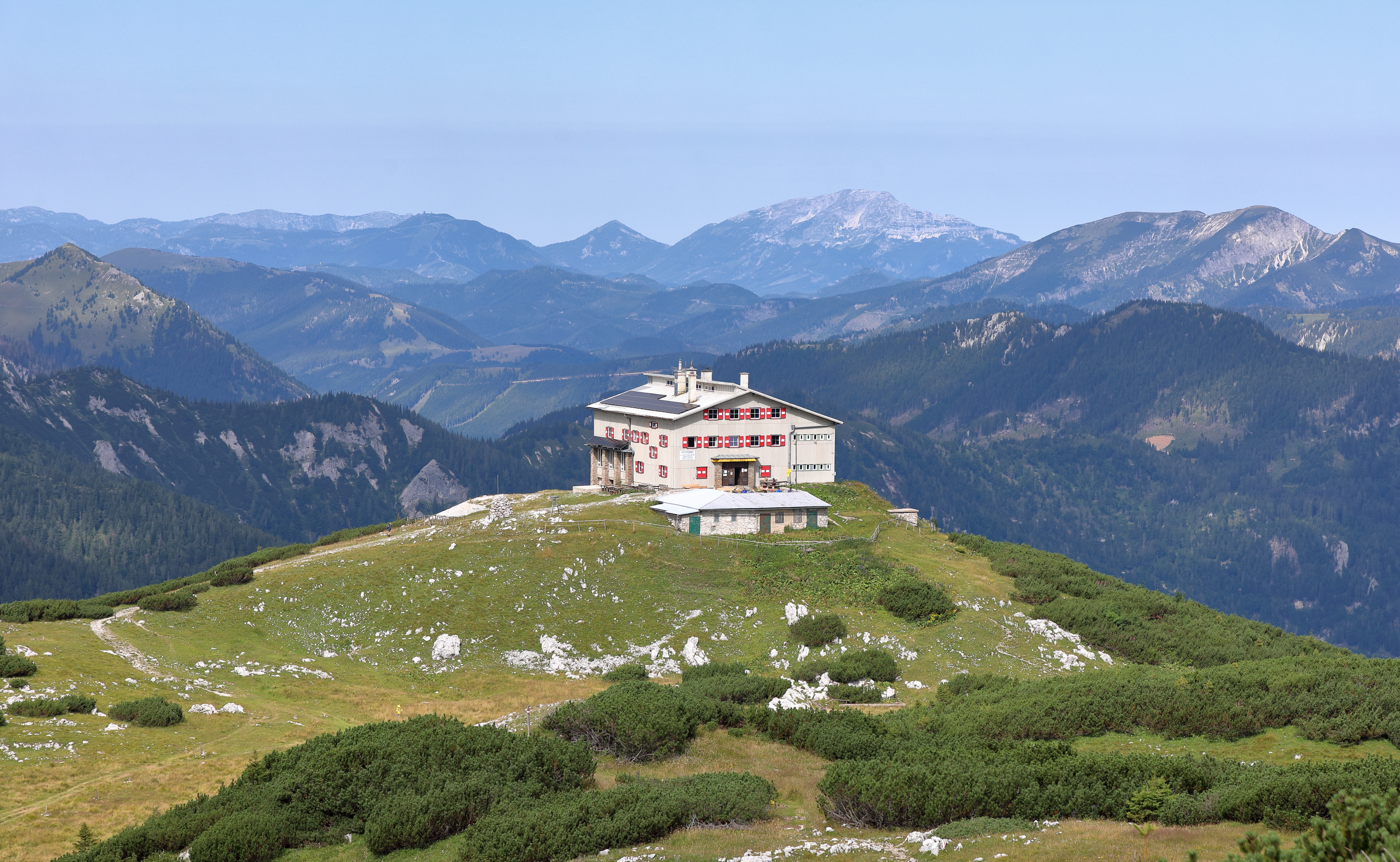
View over the Habsburghaus in the direction of the northwest

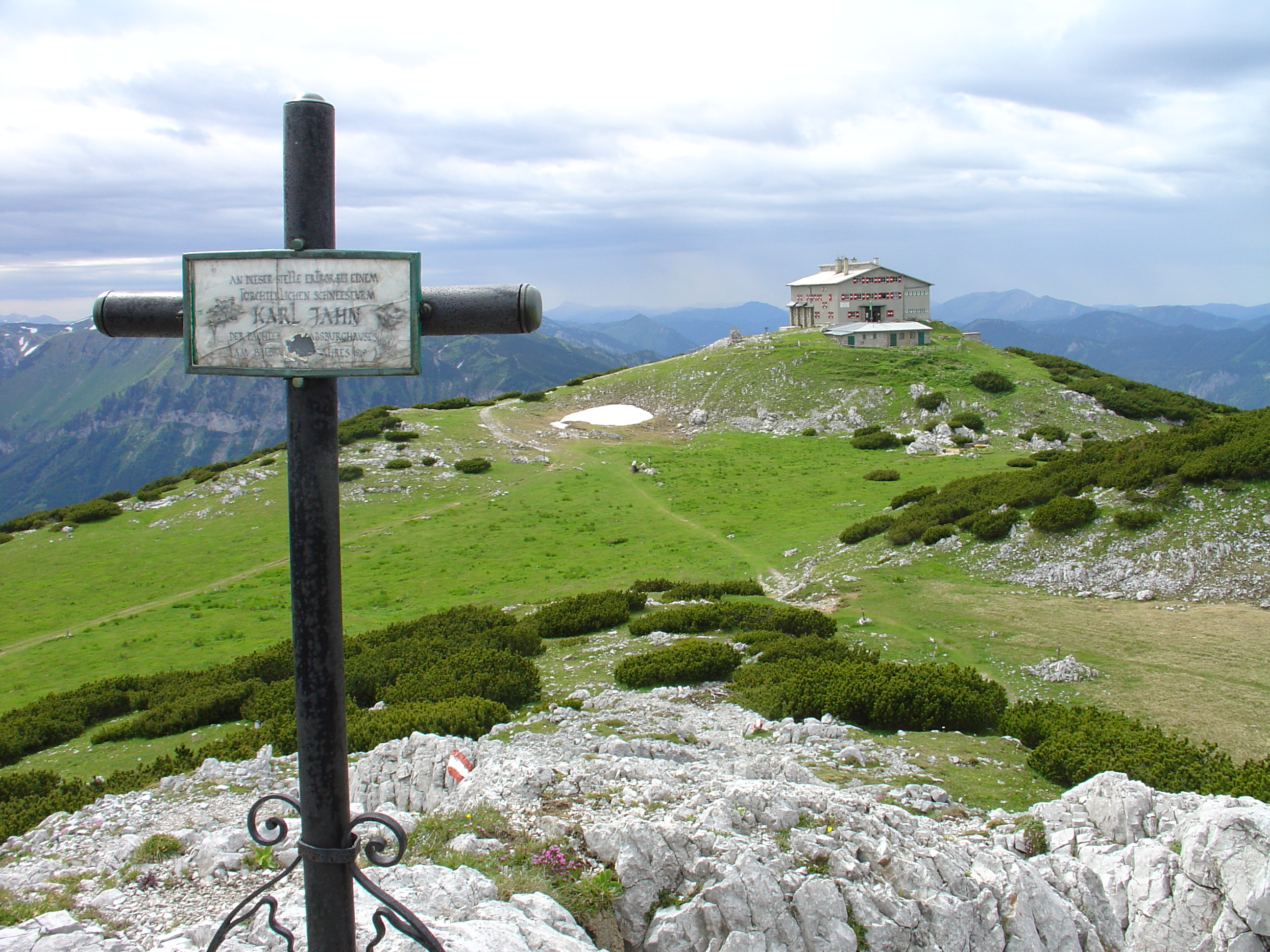
Habsburghaus (the cross marks the site where the former tenant died of hypothermia during a winter storm on February 8, 1919)

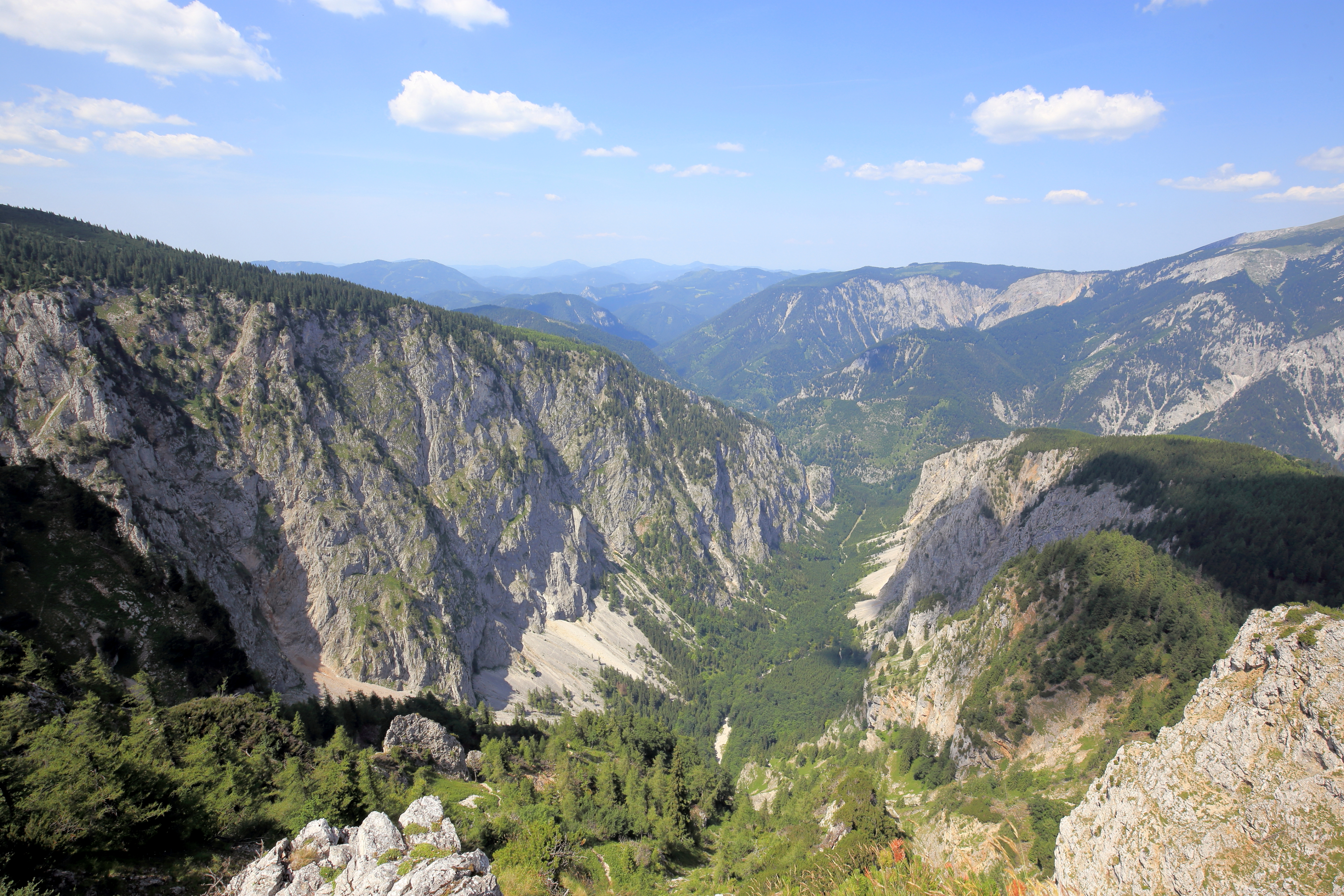
Greater Hell Valley

- Raxseilbahn mountain station, 1,540 m
- Ottohaus, 1,640 m
- Gloggnitzer Hut, 1,548 m
- Habsburg Haus, 1,785 m
- Karl Ludwig Haus, 1,804 m
- See Hut, 1,643 m
- Waxriegelhaus 1,361 m
- Wolfgang Dirnbacher Hut, 1,477 m (shelter only)

== Some Hikes and Rises ==
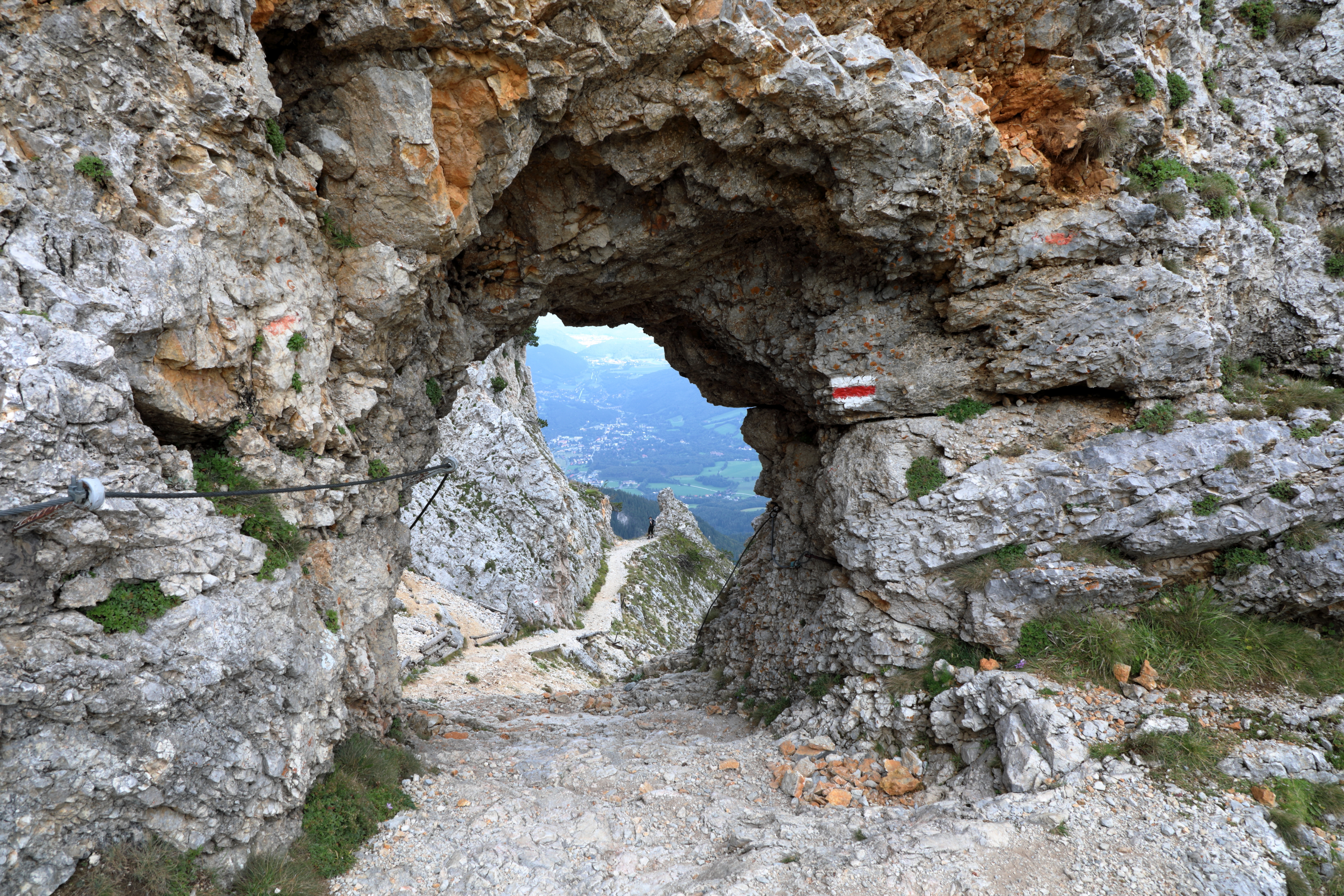
The Törl on the Törlweg

- Alpenvereins Steig: Großes Höllental – Ottohaus
- Amaliensteig: Preiner Gscheid – Heukuppe
- Bärenloch: Hinternasswald – Bärengraben
- Bismarck Steig: Karl Ludwig Haus – Neue Seehütte
- Brandschneide: Kaiserbrunn – Bergstation Raxbahn
- Großes und kleines Fuchsloch: Preiner Gscheid – Heukuppe
- Gaislochsteig (former Guido von List Steig): Großes Höllental – Dirnbacher Hütte
- Göbl-Kühn-Steig: Waxriegelhaus – Neue Seehütte
- Gamsecksteig: Nasskamm – Grasboden Alm
- Gretchen Steig: Preiner Gscheid – Karl Ludwig Haus
- Grosses Wolfstal (unmarkiert, Schiabfahrt!) Kaiserbrunn – Ottohaus
- Grosser Kesselgraben (Schiabfahrt!) Höllental – Gloggnitzer Hütte
- Gsolhirnsteig
- Gustav-Jahn-Steig: Verbindung Alpenvereinssteig – Ausstieg Gaislochsteig
- Hans-von-Haid-Steig: Prein an der Rax – Preiner Wand
- Hoyossteig: Großes Höllental – Rudolfsteig
- Kaiser Steig: Rehboden – Scheibwald
- Karl-Kantner-Steig: Waxriegelhaus – Karl Ludwig Haus
- Kontrußsteig: Reißtalerhütte – Waxriegelhaus
- Peter Jokl Steig: Hinternasswald – Scheibwald
- Preinerwandsteig: Prein an der Rax – Preiner Wand
- Preintalersteig: Großes Höllental – Wachthüttelkamm
- Reißtalersteig: Preiner Gscheid – Heukuppe
- Rudolfssteig: Höllental – Klobentörl
- Schlangenweg: Waxriegelhaus – Karl Ludwig Haus
- Schüttersteig: Verbindungsstrasse Nasswald/Hinternasswald – Scheibwald
- Seeweg: Ottohaus – Neue Seehütte
- Teufelsbadstubensteig: Großes Höllental – Wachthüttelkamm
- Törlweg: Knappenhof – Ottohaus
- Wachthüttelkamm: Höllental – Ottohaus
- Waxriegelsteig: Predigtstuhl – Waxriegelhaus
- Wildes Gamseck: Nasskamm – Grasboden Alm
- Wildfährte: Hinternasswald – Grasboden Alm
- Zikafahnlsteig: Scheibwald – Habsburghaus
