= Miramare (disambiguation) =

Miramare Castle is a 19th-century castle on the Gulf of Trieste near Trieste in northeastern Italy.

Miramare may also refer to:

== Places ==
- Miramare, Trieste, a neighborhood in the district of Barcola, Trieste, Italy where Miramare Castle is located
  - Miramare railway station
- Miramare, Rimini, a district in Rimini, Italy
  - Miramare Airport, now Federico Fellini International Airport in Rimini, Italy
- Royal Miramare Theatre, a theatre formerly located at Independence Square (now Martyrs' Square) in Tripoli, Libya
- Stadio Miramare, a multi-use stadium in Manfredonia, Italy

== Other ==
- "Miramare", Op. 247, an overture by Julius Fučík

== See also ==
- Miramar (disambiguation)
