= Miramar =

Miramar is a place name of Spanish and Portuguese origin. It means "sea-view" or "sea sight" from mirar ("to look at, to watch") and mar ("sea"). It may refer to:

== Places ==
=== Africa ===
- Miramar, Port Elizabeth, see St Dominic's Priory School

=== Asia ===
- Miramar, Goa

=== Europe ===
- Miramar, Théoule-sur-Mer, France
- Miramar, Portugal, a village
- Miramar, Spain, a municipality
- Miramar (Málaga), one of the districts of Málaga, Spain

=== North America ===
- Miramar, Havana, an upscale district in the municipality of Playa, Cuba
- Miramar, Baja California, Mexico, see USS Yorktown (PG-1)
- Miramar, Tamaulipas, Mexico
- Miramar, Bocas del Toro, Panama
- Miramar, Colón, Colón Province, Panama
- Miramar, Puerto Rico, a neighborhood of San Juan
- Miramar, San Diego, California
- Miramar, Florida, a city in Broward County
- Miramar Beach, California
- Miramar Beach, Florida, Walton County
- Miramar District, Costa Rica
- Naval Consolidated Brig, Miramar, military prison operated by the U.S. Navy at Marine Corps Air Station Miramar in Miramar, San Diego, California

=== Oceania ===
- Miramar, New Zealand, a suburb of Wellington
- The Miramar Peninsula, on which the suburb is located
- Miramar (New Zealand electorate), a parliamentary constituency
- Mira Mar, Western Australia, a suburb of Albany

=== South America ===
- Miramar, Buenos Aires, Argentina
- Miramar, Córdoba, Argentina

== Landmarks ==
- Mira Place, formerly Miramar Shopping Centre, Hong Kong
- Miramar (mansion), a historic home on Aquidneck Island at Newport, Rhode Island, United States
- Miramar Entertainment Park, Taipei, Taiwan
  - Jiannan Road metro station, where deputy station name is Miramar station, a metro station of the Taipei Metro
- Miramar Palace, San Sebastián, Spain
- Miramare (also known as Schloß Miramar), Trieste, Italy
- Marine Corps Air Station Miramar, San Diego, California, United States
- San Diego Miramar College, California, United States
- California Miramar University, San Diego, California, United States

== Media ==
- TV Miramar, a television station in João Pessoa, Brazil
- Televisão Miramar, a Mozambican television channel

== Other uses ==
- Estación de Miramar (es), a station on the Port Vell Aerial Tramway in Barcelona, Spain
- Miramar Basket Ball Club, Parque Batlle, Montevideo; see Uruguayan Basketball Federation
- Miramar Misiones, a football (soccer) club in Montevideo, Uruguay
- Miramar Futsal Clube, a defunct futsal club in Valadares, Portugal
- Miramar (novel), 1967 novel written by Naguib Mahfouz
- Miramar Hotel and Investment, a Hong Kong hotel chain company
- USS Miramar, later USS SP-672, a United States Navy patrol boat in commission from 1917 to 1918
- Miramar Esporte Clube, a Brazilian football (soccer) club
- Miramar (Weinheim), water park and sauna complex in Germany

== See also ==
- Miramare (disambiguation)
