= Miramare railway station =

Railway station in Italy

Coordinates: 45°42′18″N 13°43′11″E

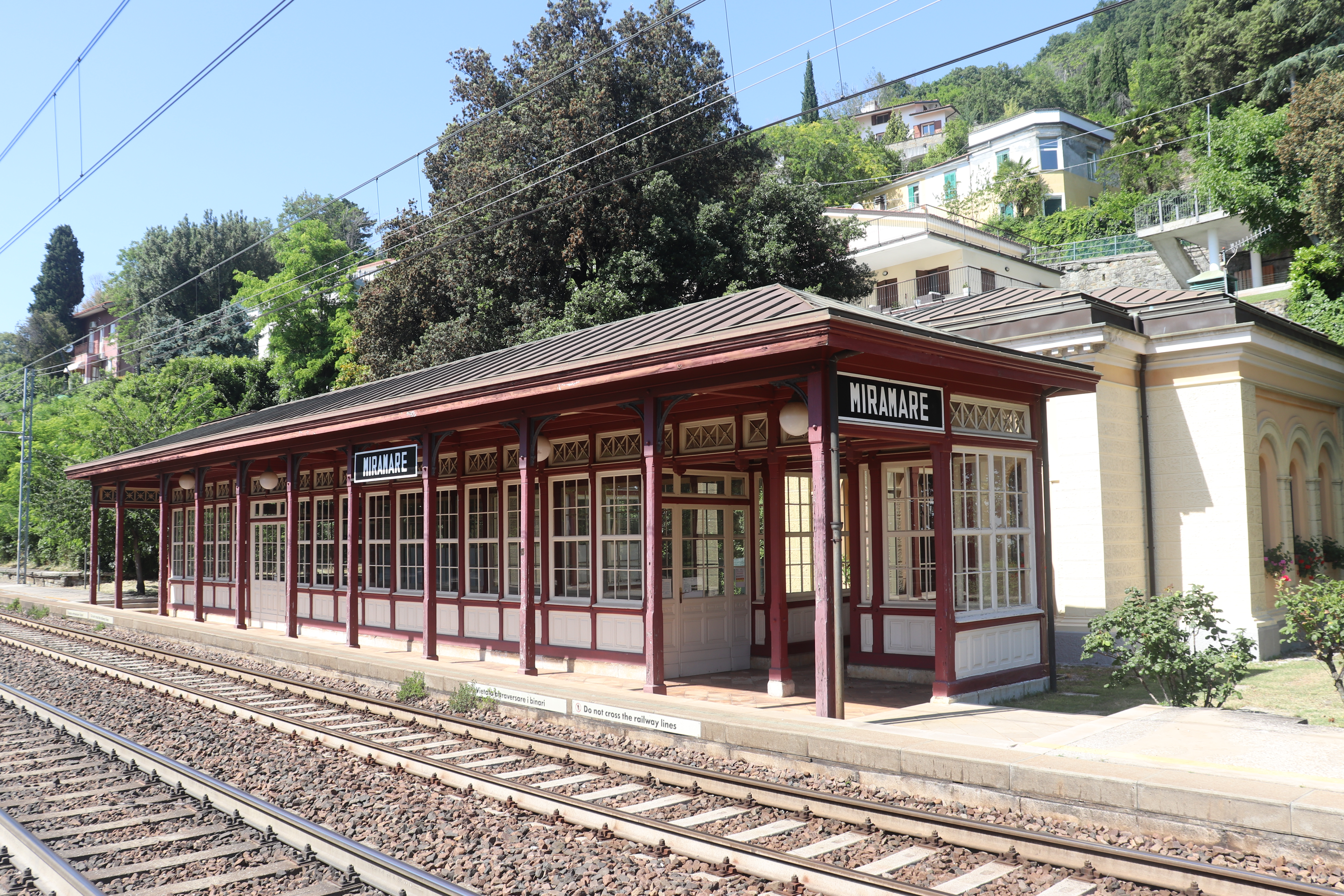
Miramare railway stop

Miramare railway station (Italian: Stazione di Miramare) is a railway station in Miramare, a suburb of Trieste, in the autonomous region of Friuli-Venezia Giulia, northeastern Italy. The station was constructed in 1857 on a line which at the time connected Vienna with Trieste. The purpose of the new station was mainly to serve the Miramare Castle, newly constructed residence of the Archduke Maximilian. The station building is intact but it is closed, and only local trains to Udine stop at the station.

== Train services ==
The station is served by the following services:

- Regional services (Treno regionale) Venice - Treviso - Udine - Gorizia - Trieste
- Regional services (Treno regionale) Tarvisio - Carnia - Gemona del Friuli - Udine - Cervignano del Friuli - Trieste
