= Carl Junker =

Austrian engineer and architect (1827–1882)

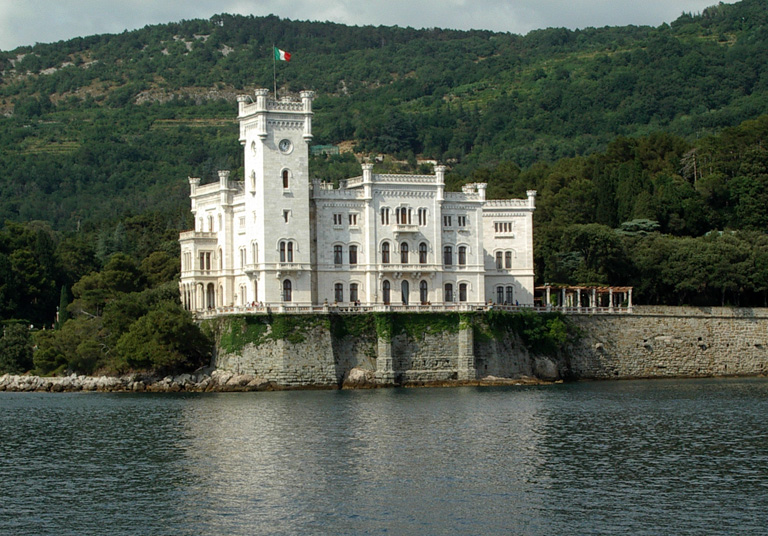
Miramare Castle in Trieste

Carl Junker (18 June 1827 – 17 May 1882) was an Austrian engineer and architect. His construction projects include Miramare Castle in Trieste and the First Vienna Mountain Spring Pipeline.

== Life ==
Carl Junker was born as the son of a tenant farmer in 1827 in Saubersdorf in Lower Austria. From 1842 to 1845, he studied at the Imperial-Royal Polytechnic Institute and became an engineer.

Throughout his career he devoted himself mainly to the construction of aqueducts and water pipes. In 1847, he was involved in the construction of the Suez Canal under Alois Negrelli. In 1855, he took over the plans for the construction of the aqueduct of Aurisina in Trieste.

In 1856, he was instructed by archduke of Maximilian I of Mexico, the brother of Emperor Franz Joseph I of Austria, with the construction of the Miramare Castle in Grignano near Trieste.

In 1860, he took over the supervision of a church in Bar in present-day Montenegro. Pope Pius IX granted him the Order of St. Gregory the Great for the project.

Between 1860 and 1861, he was in charge of the construction of the aqueduct of the military arsenal in Pula. In 1864 he worked on Vienna's Emperor Franz Joseph water supply system on the grounds of his experience in hydrography. He was the lead chief engineer in the design and construction management from the springs to the elevated tank at the Rosenhügel in Hietzing, the 13th municipal District of Vienna. Emperor Franz Joseph I awarded Junker the Order of Franz Joseph for his work on this project.

Junker died in Vienna on 17 May 1882, aged 54.

== Key construction projects ==
- Miramare Castle near Trieste (1856–1860)
- First Vienna Mountain Spring Pipeline (1865)

== Publications ==
- Carl Junker (1873): Die Wasserversorgung der Stadt Wien, in: R. Stadler, Wien
- Carl Junker (1985): Projekt der Zuleitung des Recca Flusses von St. Canzian, Trieste
