= Miramare Castle =

Castle in Trieste, Italy

- Castello di Miramare (Italian)
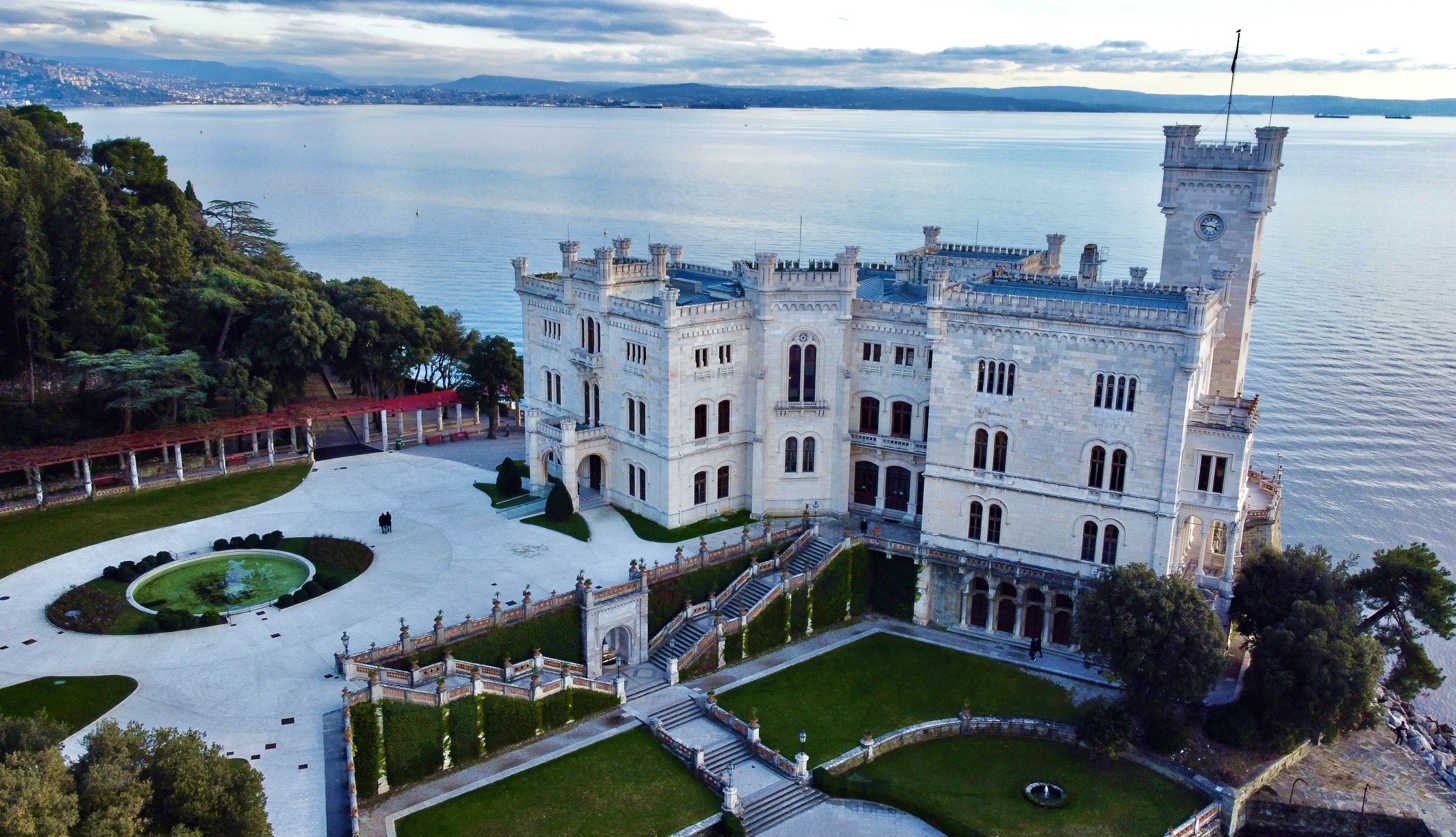
- Miramare Castle on the Gulf of Trieste
- Interactive map of Miramare Castle
- 45°42′09″N 13°42′44″E
- Type: Castle
- Location: Grignano, Trieste, Friuli Venezia Giulia, Italy

History
- Built: 1856–1860

Site notes
- Architect: Carl Junker
- Architectural styles: Eclectic (Gothic Revival and Renaissance Revival)
- Governing body: Italian Ministry of Culture
- Visitors: 254,265 (in 2022)
- Website: miramare.cultura.gov.it/en/

Miramare Castle (Italian: Castello di Miramare; Slovene: Grad Miramar; German: Schloss Miramar; Spanish: Castillo de Miramar) is a 19th-century castle direct on the Gulf of Trieste between Barcola and Grignano in Trieste, northeastern Italy. It was built from 1856 to 1860 for Austrian Archduke Ferdinand Maximilian and his wife, Charlotte of Belgium, later Emperor Maximilian I of Mexico and Empress Carlota of Mexico, based on a design by Carl Junker.

The castle's grounds include an extensive cliff and seashore park of 22 hectares (54 acres) designed by the archduke. The grounds were completely re-landscaped to feature numerous tropical species of trees and plants.

== History ==
=== Castle ===
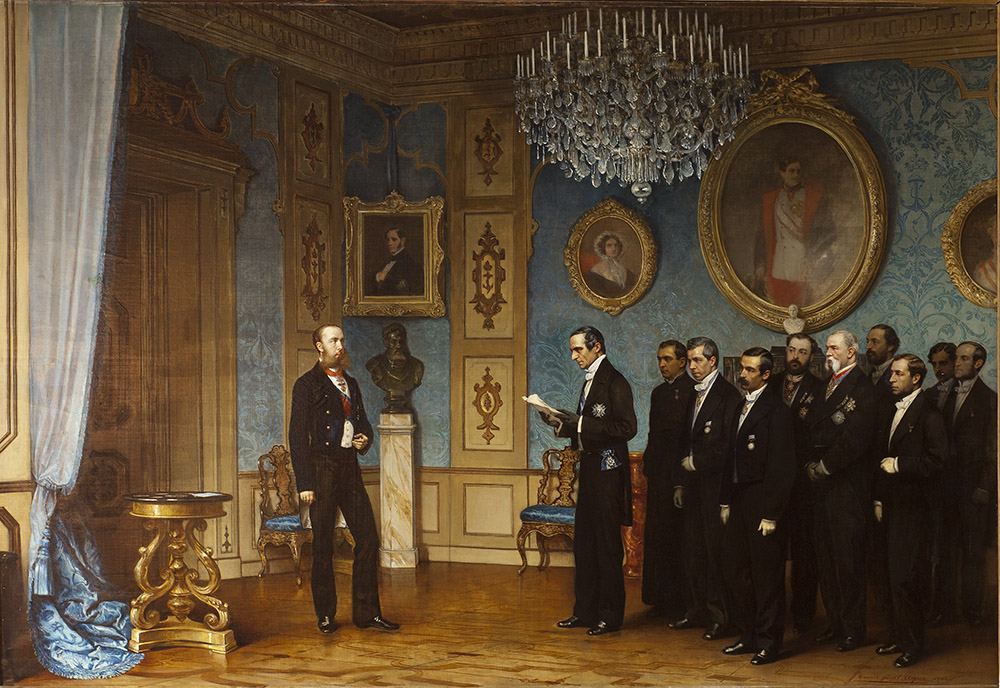
Painting by Cesare dell'Acqua (1867) of Maximilian receiving the Mexican delegation offering him the crown of Mexico.

Miramare Castle and its park were built by order of Ferdinand Maximilian (1832–1867), of the House of Habsburg-Lorraine. In 1850, at the age of eighteen, Ferdinand Maximilian - younger brother of Franz Joseph, Emperor of Austria - came to Trieste with his own younger brother, Archduke Charles. Immediately afterwards he set off on a short cruise in the eastern Mediterranean. This journey confirmed him in his intention to sail and to get to know the world. In 1852 he was appointed an officer and in 1854 he became Commander in Chief of the Imperial Austrian Navy. He decided to move to Trieste and to have a home built facing the sea and surrounded by a park worthy of his name and rank.

According to tradition, when the archduke was caught in a sudden storm in the Gulf, he took shelter in the little harbour of Grignano and chose a bare rocky spur of limestone origin as the setting for his home. The whole complex, purchased for the first time at the beginning of March 1856, was called Miramar, possibly after the name of Prince Ferdinand of Saxe-Coburg-Gotha-Koháry's residence in Pena, Portugal.

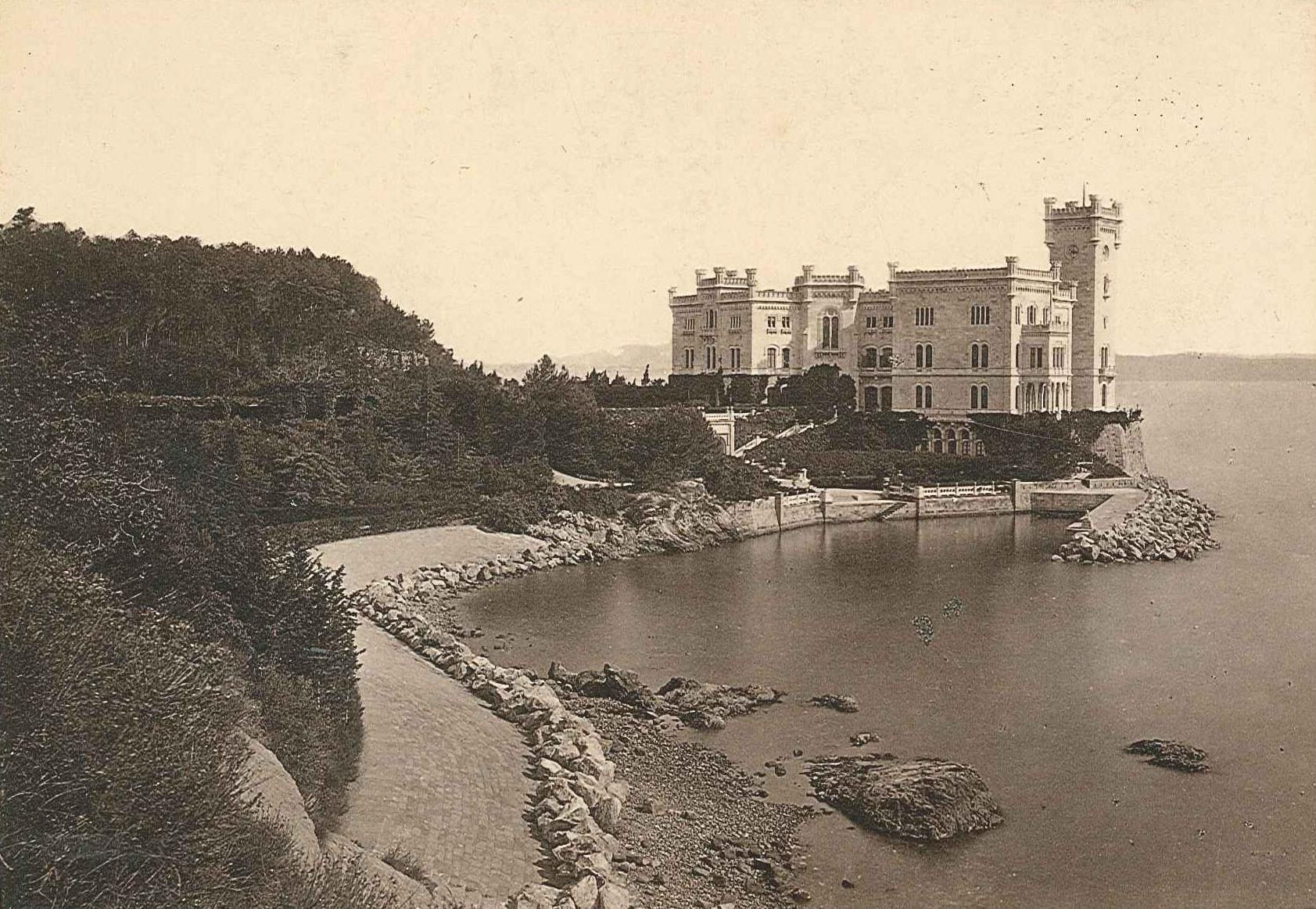
Miramare Castle, c. 1880

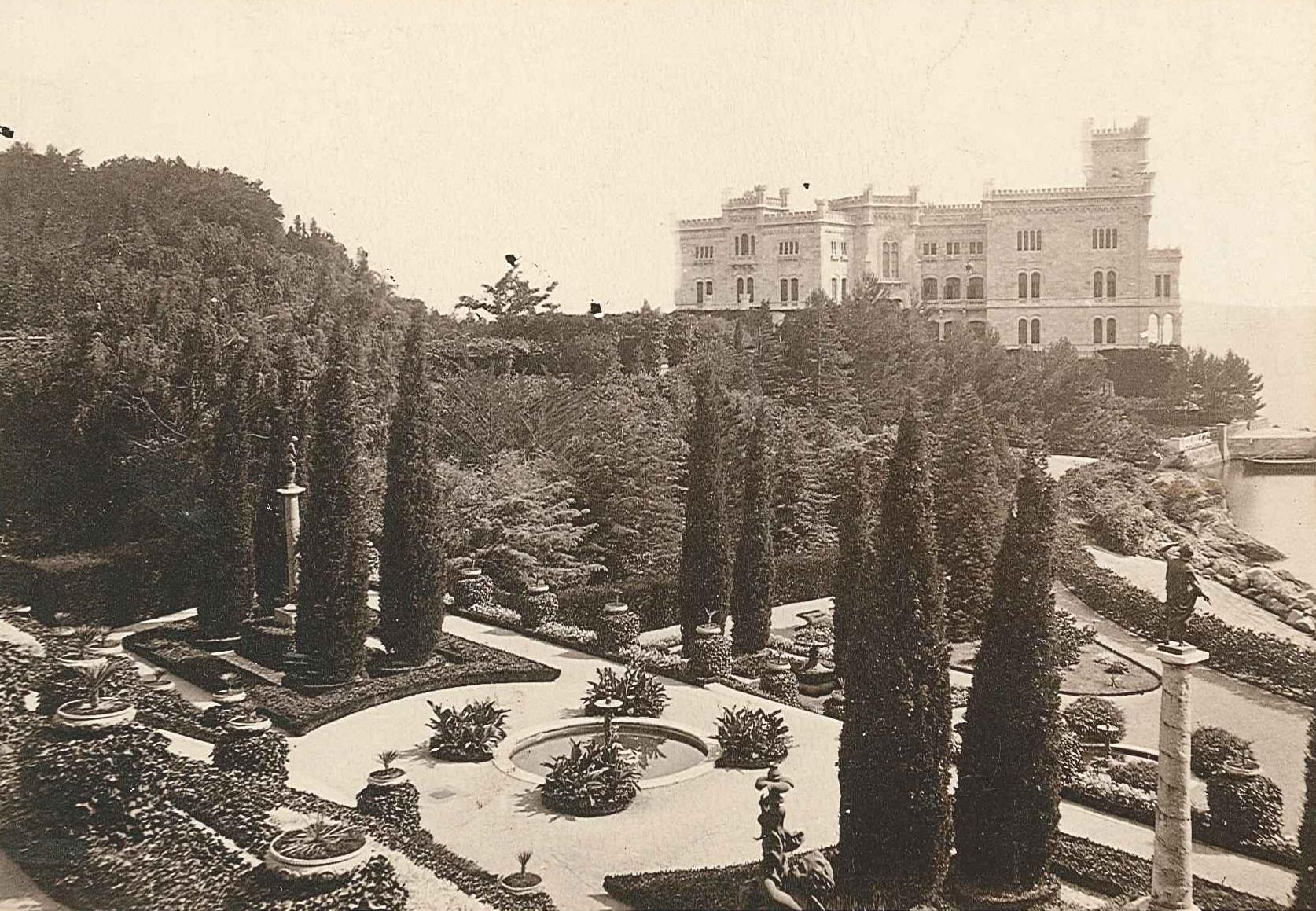
The gardens of Miramare Castle, c. 1880

Designed in 1856 by Carl Junker, an Austrian architect, the architectural structure of Miramare was finished in 1860. The style reflects the artistic interests of the archduke, who was acquainted with the eclectic architectural styles of Austria, Germany and England. The craftsman Franz Hofmann and his son, Julius Hofmann, were entrusted with the furnishing and decorations. Hofmann, who worked in the city of Trieste, was a skillful artisan who was willing to follow Maximilian’s suggestions. Both the artisan and his patron had a similar cultural formation and they were well acquainted with the eclectic tendencies of the time.

The work, steadily supervised by Maximilian, was finished only after his departure in 1864 for Mexico; where after a brief reign as Emperor he was executed in June 1867. Maximilian intended to create an intimate atmosphere in the castle in the area reserved for his family – an area which he wanted to be in contact with nature, reflecting both his own spirit and that of an epoch.

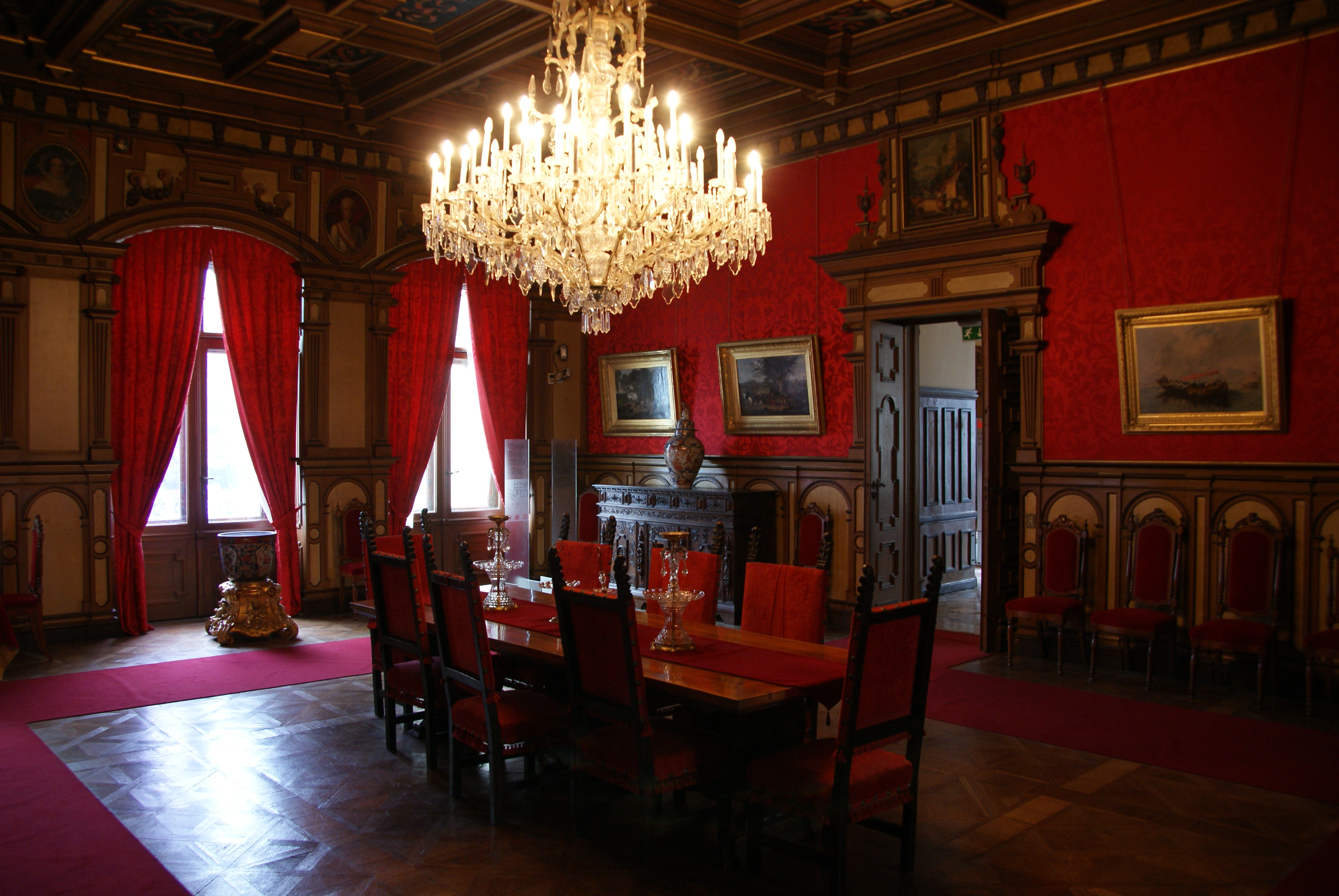
Miramare Castle interior

On the ground floor, destined for the use of Maximilian and his wife, Charlotte of Belgium, worthy of note are the bedroom and the archduke's office, which reproduce the cabin and the stern wardroom respectively of the frigate Novara, the warship used by Maximilian as Commander of the Navy, and which circumnavigated the world between 1857 and 1859; the library, whose walls are lined with bookshelves; and the rooms of the Archduchess with their tapestry of light-blue silk. All the rooms still feature the original furnishings, ornaments, furniture and objects dating back to the middle of the 19th century. Many coats of arms of the Second Mexican Empire decorate the castle, as well as stone ornaments on the exterior depicting the Aztec eagle.

The first floor includes guest-reception areas and the Throne Room. Of note are the magnificent paneling on the ceiling and walls and the Chinese and Japanese drawing-rooms with their oriental furnishings. Of particular interest is the room decorated with paintings by Cesare Dell'Acqua (1821-1905), portraying events in the life of Maximilian and the history of Miramare. Currently, the rooms in the castle are mostly arranged according to the original layout decided upon by the royal couple. A valuable photographic reportage commissioned by the archduke himself made accurate reconstruction possible.

=== Castelletto ===
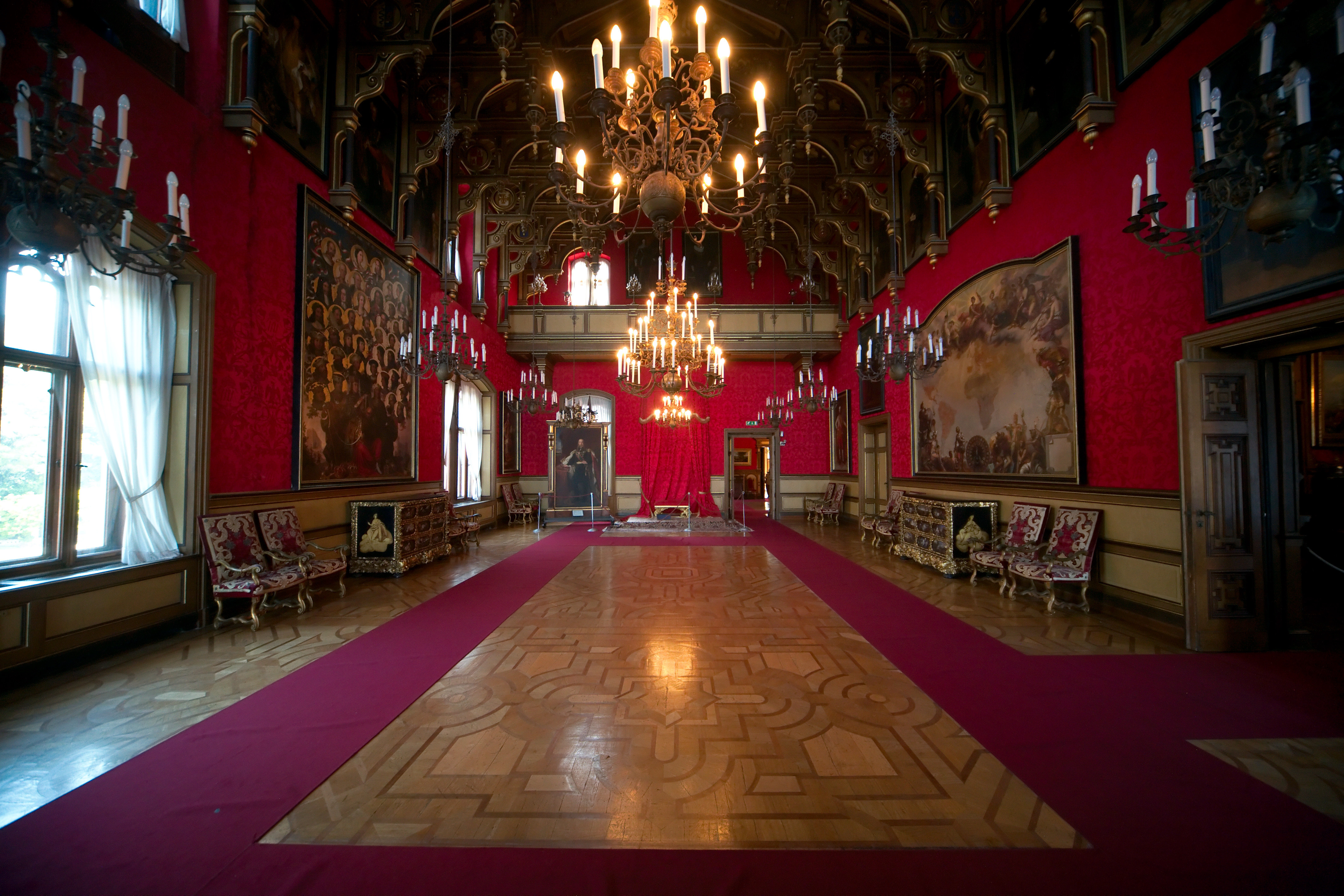
Castello Miramare interior.

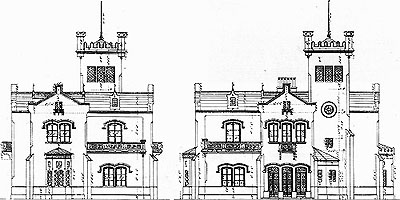
Elevations of the castle annex ("Castelletto") taken from Junker's plans

After having been commissioned as an officer in the Imperial navy in 1852, Maximilian decided to move to Trieste where he stayed for increasingly longer and more frequent periods. He rented a villa on the slopes of the hill of San Vito from Niccolò Marco Lazarovich with a clause in the contract that allowed him to make all the modifications he considered necessary. Subsequently, during the completion of Miramare Castle, the archduke had a small castle called the Gartenhaus or Castelletto built, which reproduced on a smaller scale the facade of the main castle and which he lived in off and on until Christmas 1860.

The Castelletto, situated in a panoramic area, faces Grignano on one side and on the other a parterre surrounded by trees and on a clearing in front of greenhouses at the centre of which there is a fountain. Modelled on eclectic forms on a square base with a terrace facing the castle, the tower and the arbour entrance, the Castelletto has a small number of simply furnished rooms. On the ground floor there is a decoration on plaster painted to resemble wood. On the first floor, on the other hand, there is a decoration very similar to the one in Villa Lazarovich which can be connected to Maximilian’s decision to transfer to the Castelletto his own part of the ornaments of the villa, which was his first residence in Trieste. In fact, the rooms in Turkish and German styles and the room decorated with panels of female figures present strong parallels between the two buildings and highlight the artistic tendencies of the time: numerous decorations, walls covered in paintings, many ornaments, heavy curtains and rooms crowded with furniture.

The Castelletto is linked to the history of Maximilian and Charlotte. It was here that Charlotte stayed from the end of 1866 to the summer of 1867, between her return from Mexico and journeying to Belgium. It also housed part of the furnishings of Miramare Castle during the period when the Duke of Aosta stayed there.

=== Miramare Park ===
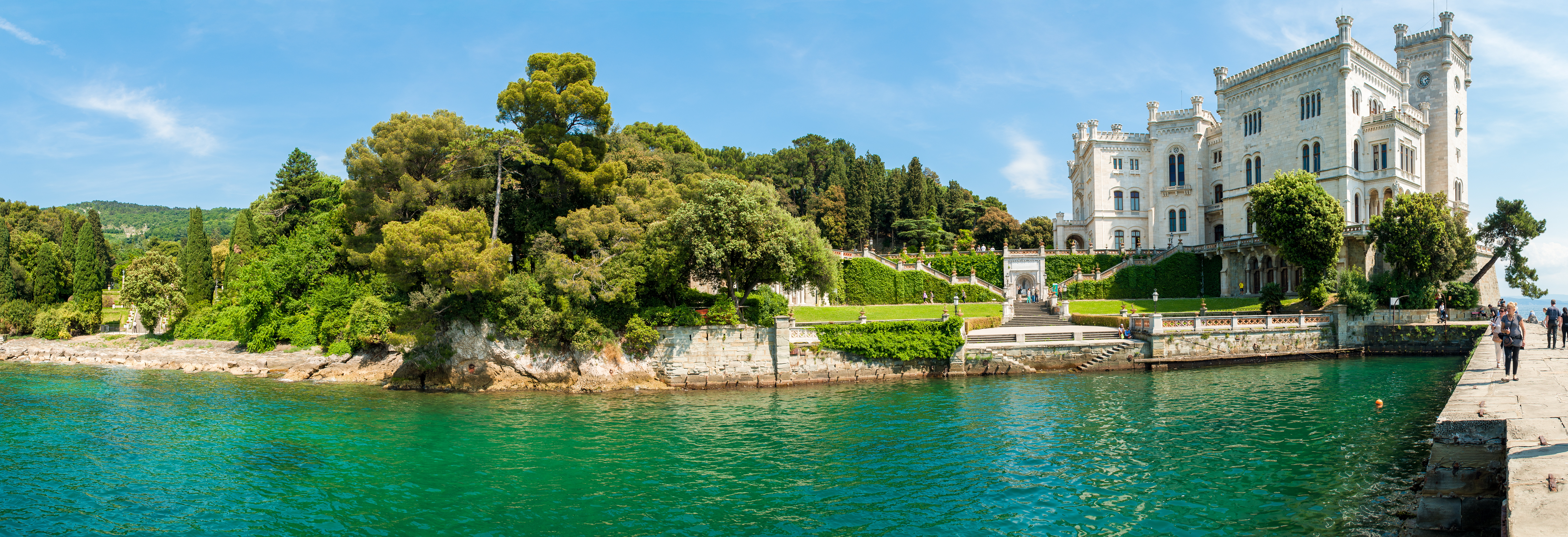
Panorama of Miramare castle

Miramare Park, which at one time had no vegetation, and has now a surface area of 22 hectares (54 acres), stands on a rocky promontory overlooking the Adriatic Sea. The site was planned and arranged by Carl Junker, according to the wishes of Archduke Maximilian who carefully followed the building of his residence. As far as the botanical aspect was concerned, a gardener, Josef Laube, was called in but was replaced in 1859 by Anton Jelinek, a Bohemian who had taken part in the frigate Novara's expedition around the world.

The park, on which work began in 1856, represents a classic example of a mixed, artificial implantation of ligneous forest-trees and bushes and it succeeds in blending the charm of a typically Northern environment and a Mediterranean context. In contrast to the Baroque garden, the English one – on which Miramare is modelled – introduces a new relationship with nature, resulting from a different sensibility towards the material world. This is why, when strolling along the paths in the park, you can breathe in an atmosphere that is tightly bound up with the life of its owner and his romantic relationship with nature, which was typical of his epoch.

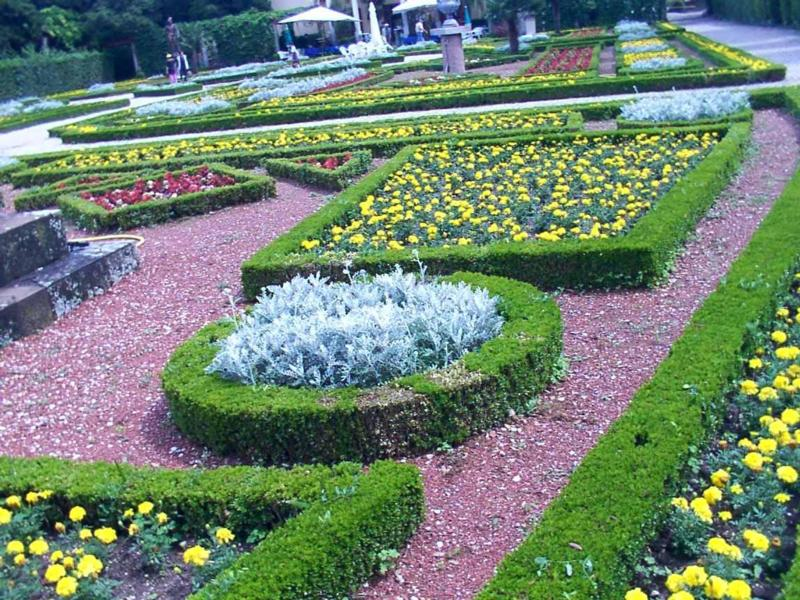
Close-up of the parterre in the French formal garden.

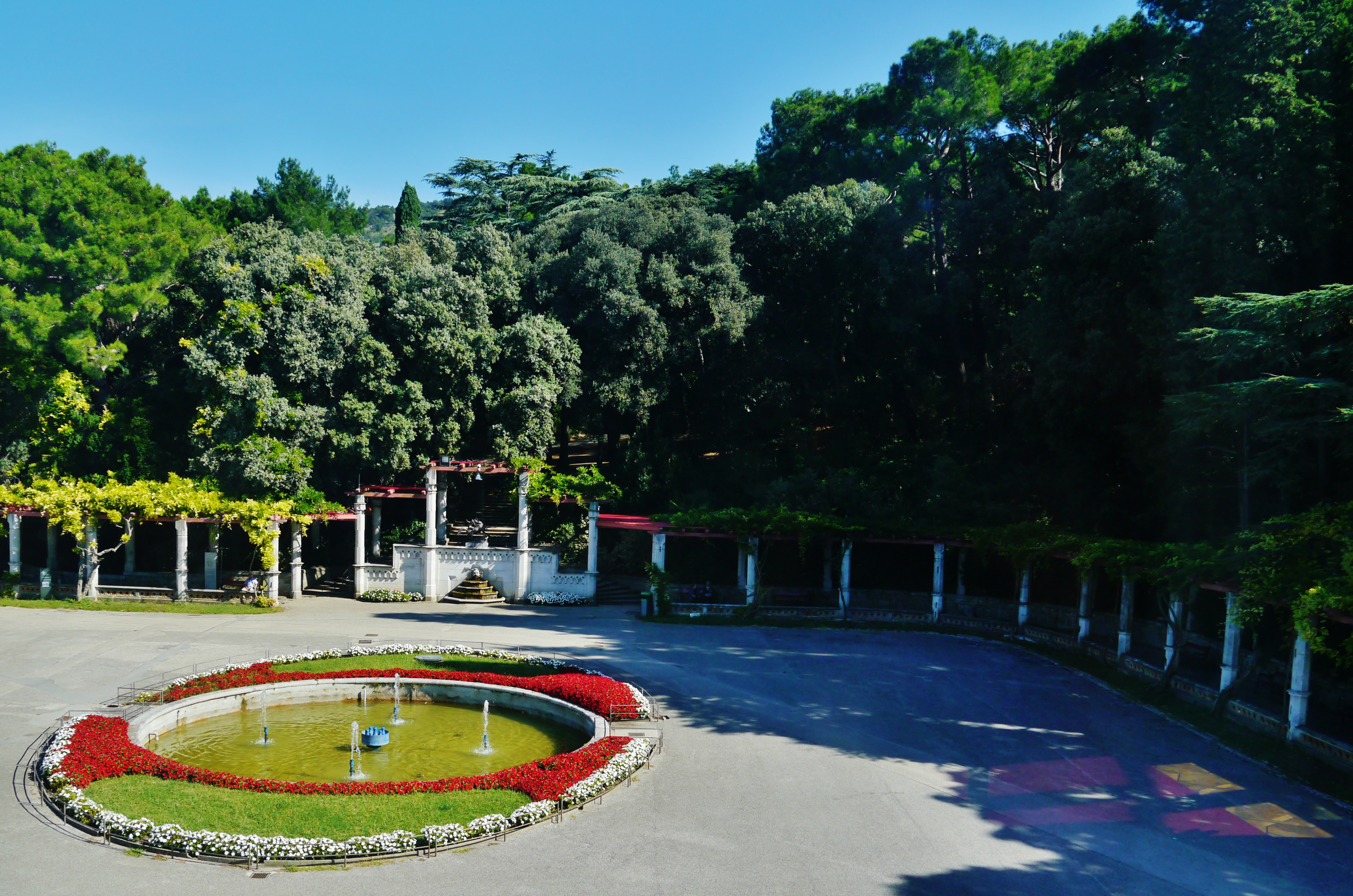
Miramare Castle Grounds, Trieste, Friuli-Venezia Giulia, Italy.

Before 1856, the park area was bare, with only some shrubs and thorny bushes. Today, on the other hand, there is a group of different species of trees that are, for the most part, of non-European origin or in any case, that are not native to the area. Within a period of ten years, cedars of Lebanon, North Africa and the Himalayas were planted, along with firs and spruces from Spain, cypresses from California and Mexico, various species of pine from Asia and America, to which some exotic specimens, such as the giant sequoia and the ginkgo biloba, were added. Miramare was conceived as a private garden and not as a park. In fact, it does not have a monumental entrance or a driveway up to the castle. It was a garden of wonders, not intended for public use, even though the archduke opened it to the public a few days per week. Watercourses, pools, twisting paths, trees placed according to natural models, some grassy areas, are typical of English gardens. The roughness of the ground favoured the irregular lay-out of the promontory, combining the artificial transformation with the natural environment.

The park is also known for some other buildings included in Junker's project: the Castelletto – inhabited off and on by Maximilian and Charlotte – on which work began at the same time as work on the castle; the greenhouses, intended for the growing of the plants to be placed in the park; the ruins of the chapel dedicated to Saint Canciano, in whose apse is preserved a cross made from the wood of the frigate Novara, which was laid up in 1899; and lastly a little house, used nowadays as a coffee-shop, the "Swiss house", placed at the edge of the swans' lake.

Until 1954, Miramare was used as the headquarters for German, New Zealand, British and American forces of occupation respectively. Finally, in 1955, the complex was reopened to the public under the name Miramare Park, whose management was entrusted to the Sopraintendenza per i Beni Architettonici ed il Paesaggio e per il Patrimonio Storico, Artistico ed Etnoantropologico of the Friuli-Venezia Giulia region.

Today the gardens play host during the summer season to spectacles such as the musical Sissi, reliving the story of the Empire in its natural setting, and various concerts.

=== Stables ===
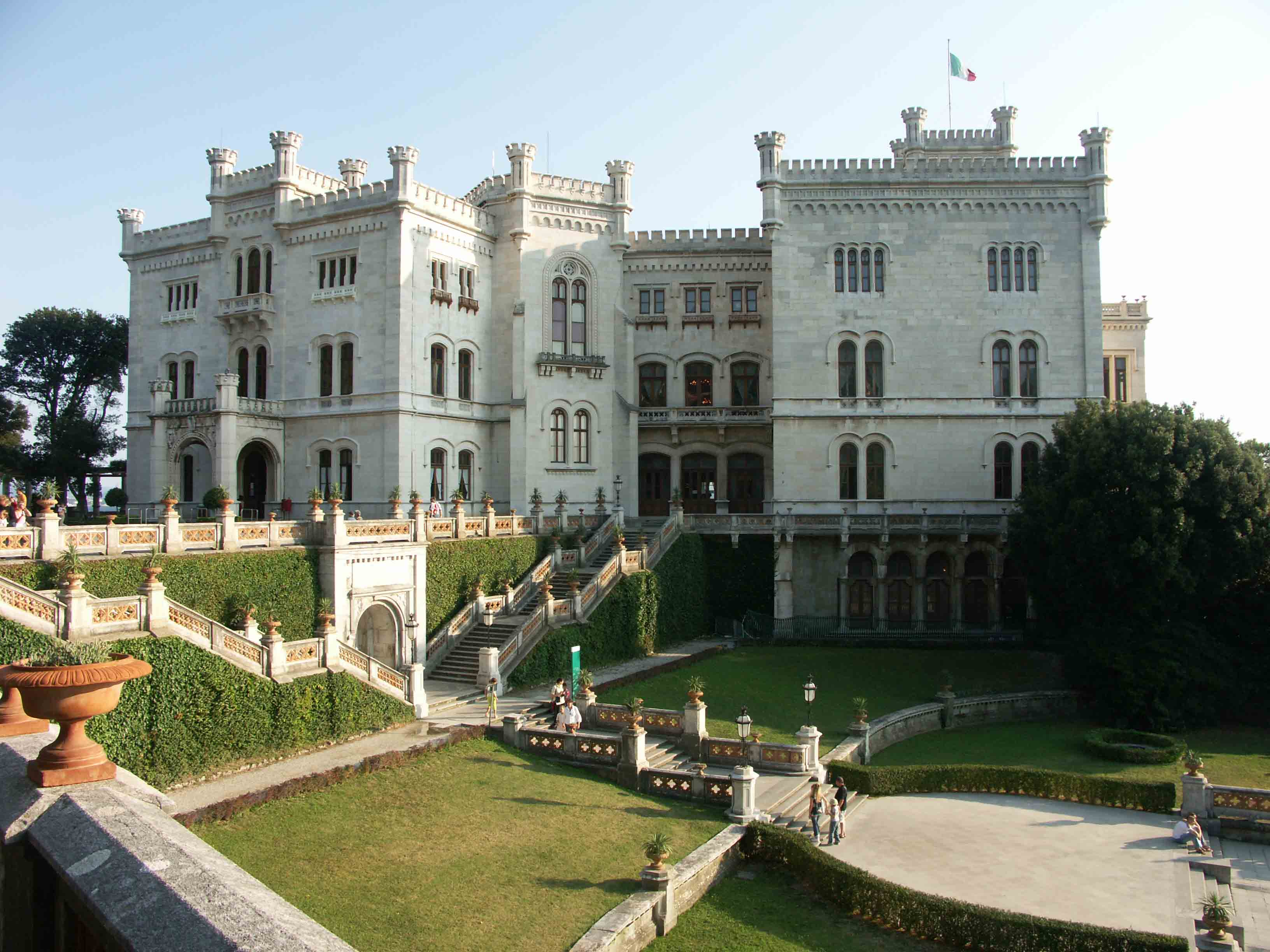
Miramar castle near Trieste, Italy.

Maximilian commissioned the plan for Miramare Castle's stables, the design of which was undertaken between 1856 and 1860 by architect Carl Junker. He had already planned all the works to be done in the area of Miramare: the castle, the park and all its access paths, the Castelletto, the Porticciolo ("little port"), the conservatories, the Swiss house and the pavilion at the back of the parterre.

Junker's sketches set out the planning of the stable's building, both in its totality and in each part devoted to a specific use.

The building is made up of three parts surrounding a central yard opened to the sea. It is located on the road leading to Trieste, in a sheltered, healthy place at a distance from the castle. It is 40 metres (131 ft) square. The central section was intended for horses: Junker's sketches including the location of the animal stalls, lining the bottom perimeter. The two wings, perfectly symmetrical, are sub-divided into three parts: near the stables box-rooms for harness; then accommodations for the staff and, finally, the kitchens, near the sea. The great pavilion at the back was reserved for coaches. Its access on the west side is made up of two main doors (one probably the entrance, the other the exit).

Between the two World Wars, when the castle was inhabited by the Dukes of Aosta, changes were made to the stables.

=== After 1867 ===
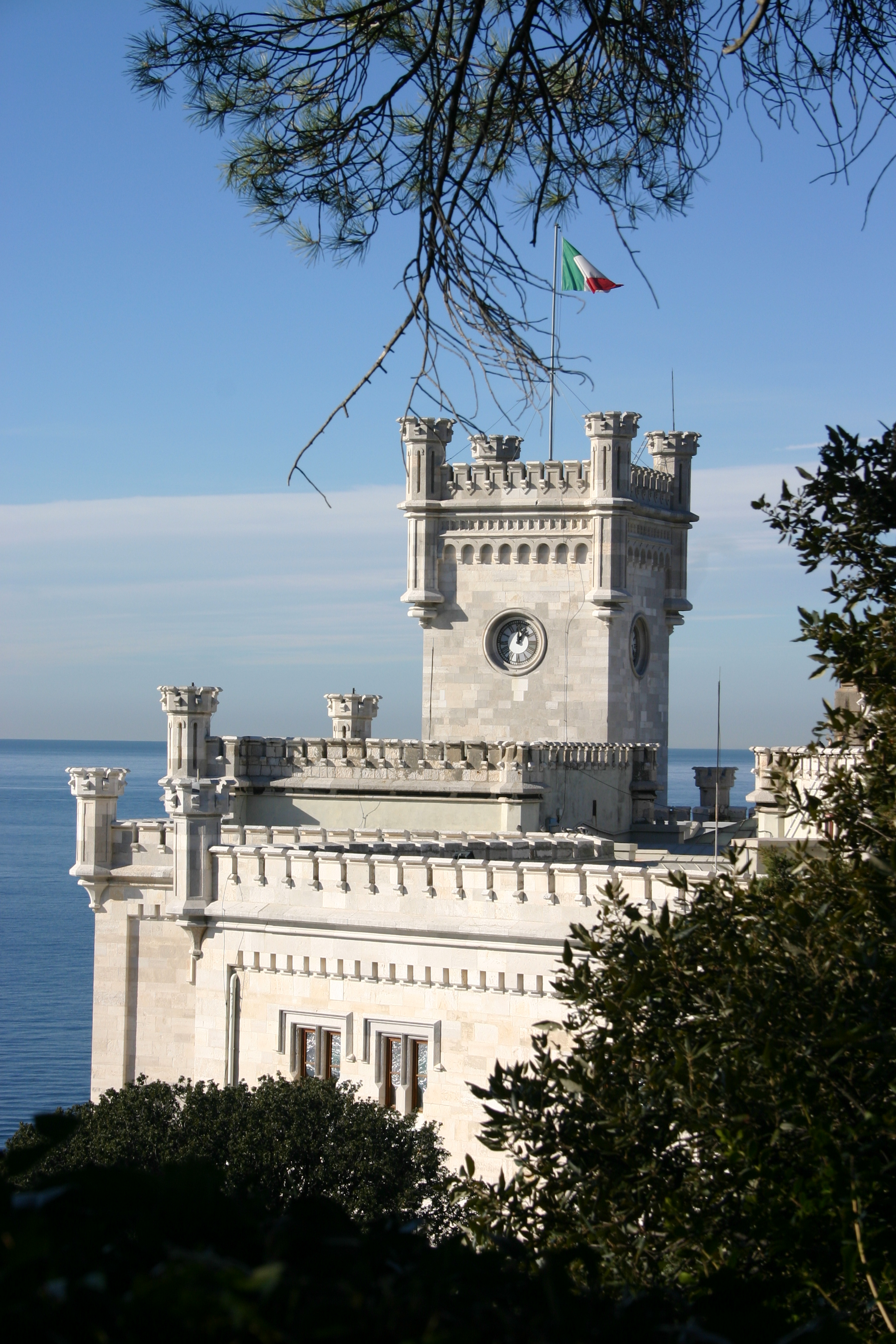
Castle

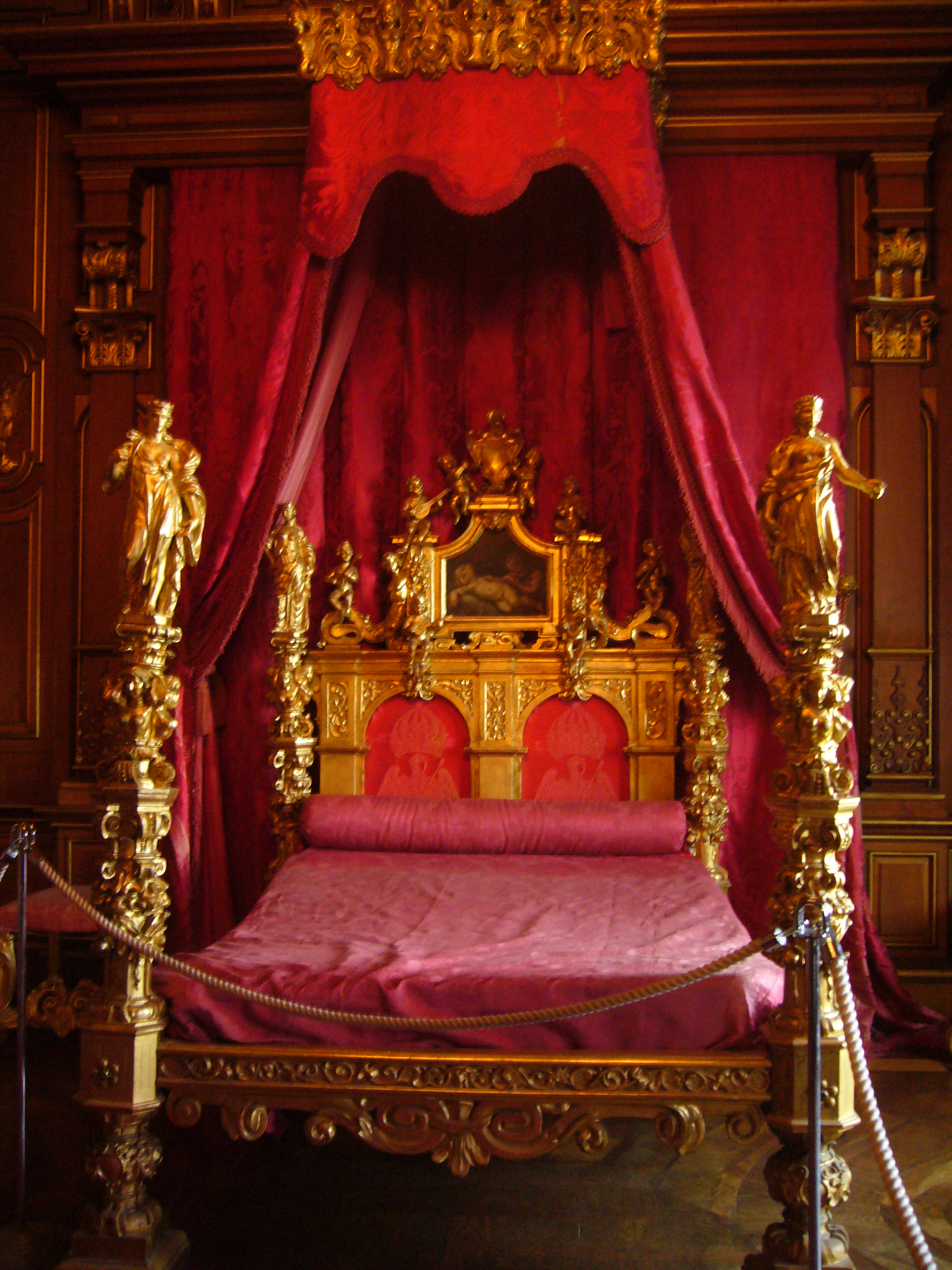
Maximilian's bed, a wedding gift from Pope Pius IX, was never slept in.

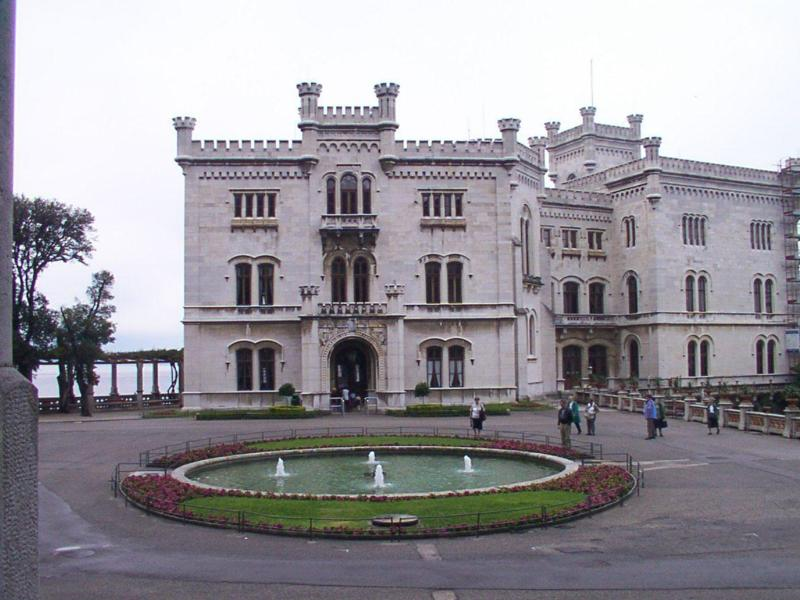
Main entrance

After the death of Maximilian I in Mexico in June 1867, and Charlotte's departure for Belgium, the castle and the park continued to be a place where the Habsburgs spent short periods.

Already in September 1882, the Emperor Franz Joseph with Empress Elisabeth and the heir to the throne Rudolf with his consort Stéphanie of Belgium, stayed in Miramare during an official visit to Trieste and gave receptions for the notables of the city. In August 1885, the Archduchess Stéphanie stayed there for a few days. Between 1869 and 1896, the Empress Elisabeth is recorded as having stayed there on at least fourteen occasions. On March 22, 1900, Stéphanie of Belgium – Charlotte's niece and Rudolf's widow – chose the chapel of the castle for her second marriage to the Hungarian noble Elemér de Lónyay. From March 9 to April 11, 1914, the heir to the throne Archduke Franz Ferdinand lived in the castle with his wife and sons and gave hospitality to the German Emperor William; two months later the archduke was assassinated at Sarajevoon June 28,1914. Also noteworthy is the visit of the last Emperor Charles and his wife Zita.

During the First World War, all the furniture and works of art belonging to the castle were moved to Vienna and stored in the Schönbrunn and Belvedere Palaces and in the court libraries. At the end of the war the whole territory of Miramare passed under the direct control of the Italian government. Between October 1925 and March 1926, by mutual consent of the two governments, Austria returned all the furnishings in order to make possible the reconstruction of the castle's original interior. The restoration of the furnishings and rooms, under the direction of the Royal Superintendence, meant that the museum could be opened to the public on March 24, 1929.

Two years later the government assigned Miramare to Duke Amedeo of Aosta, captain of the first air division stationed in Gorizia, who lived there continuously till 1937, when he was appointed viceroy of Ethiopia. The castle was also inhabited on and off by the duke's family until the middle of 1943.

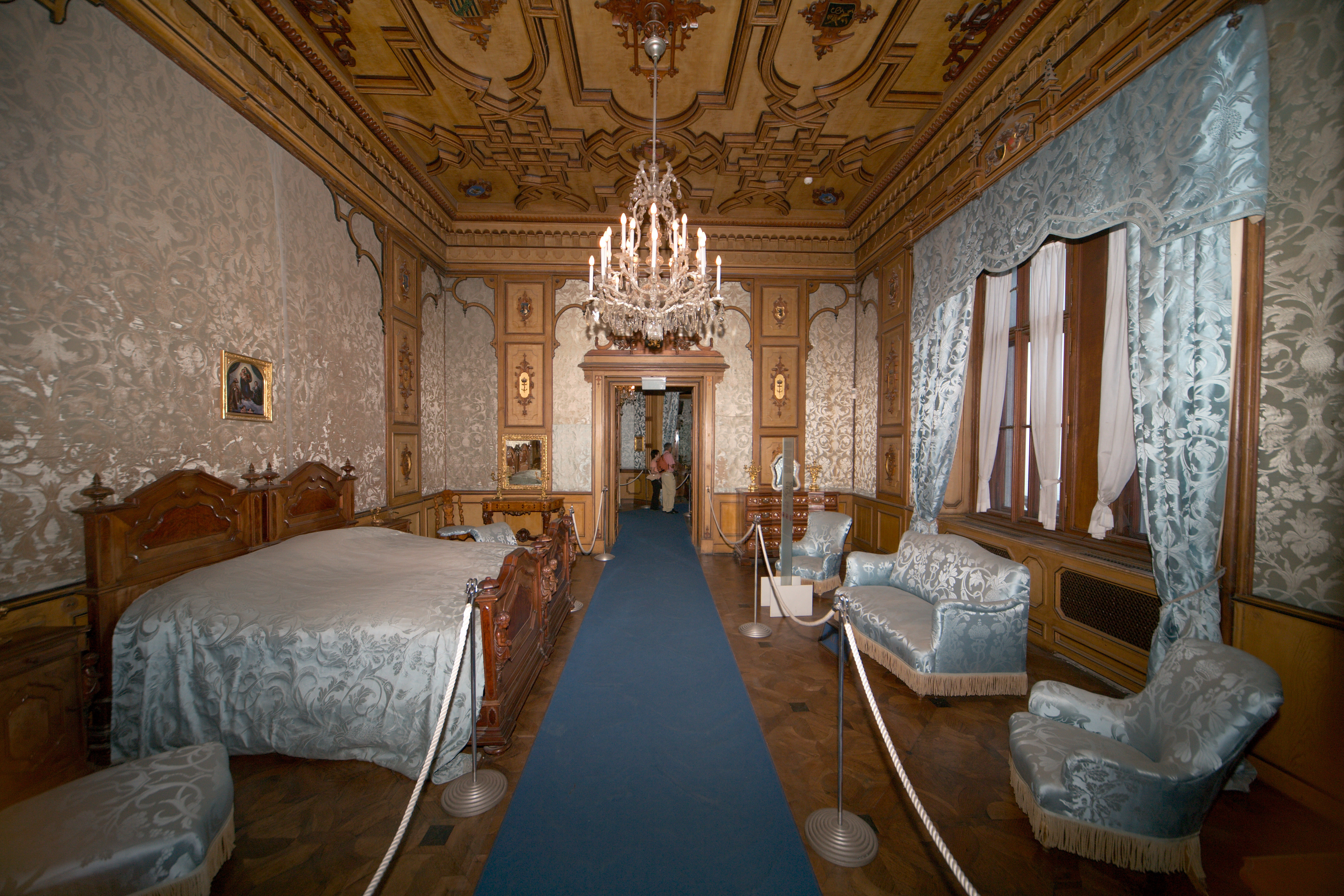
Castello Miramare interior.

Nonetheless, visitors were allowed access to the upper part of the park and, from 1931, to the Castelletto, furnished with Archduke Maximilian's fittings which had not formed part of the Duke of Aosta's furnishings. Afterwards the castle was used as a school for officers by the German troops who occupied the city. As a result of the opposition of the Gauleiter Friedrich Rainer to the conversion of the castle into Nazi headquarters, the building was saved from possible bombardment. In the meantime, the furnishings had been removed and were kept in various buildings in the city.

At the end of 1945, the New Zealand troops under the command of the General Freyberg entered Trieste and settled in the castle, making many changes to the interior. The British troops followed, and set up the headquarters of XIII Corps in Miramare. Finally the Americans came and the castle served as headquarters for the American garrison Trieste United States Troops (TRUST) from 1947 to October 3, 1954. The Superintendence immediately began the work of restoration of the interior of the castle and the Castelletto and the layout of the park. On the basis of drawings and period photographs, wood decorations were restored in the rooms and furniture, furnishings, pictures and tapestries were rearranged.

Finally, in March 1955, the park was reopened free of charge to the public and from June 2 of the same year, Maximilian's residence was named the Historical Museum of Miramare Castle and entrusted to the Sopraintendenza per i Beni Architettonici ed il Paesaggio e per il Patrimonio Storico, Artistico ed Etnoantropologico of the Friuli-Venezia Giulia region. Over the years it has become an attraction for thousands of tourists interested in experiencing full immersion in one of the very few examples of European historical residences which have preserved almost entirely their original furnishings and which, still today, transmit the charm of living around the middle of the Nineteenth century.

== Museum ==
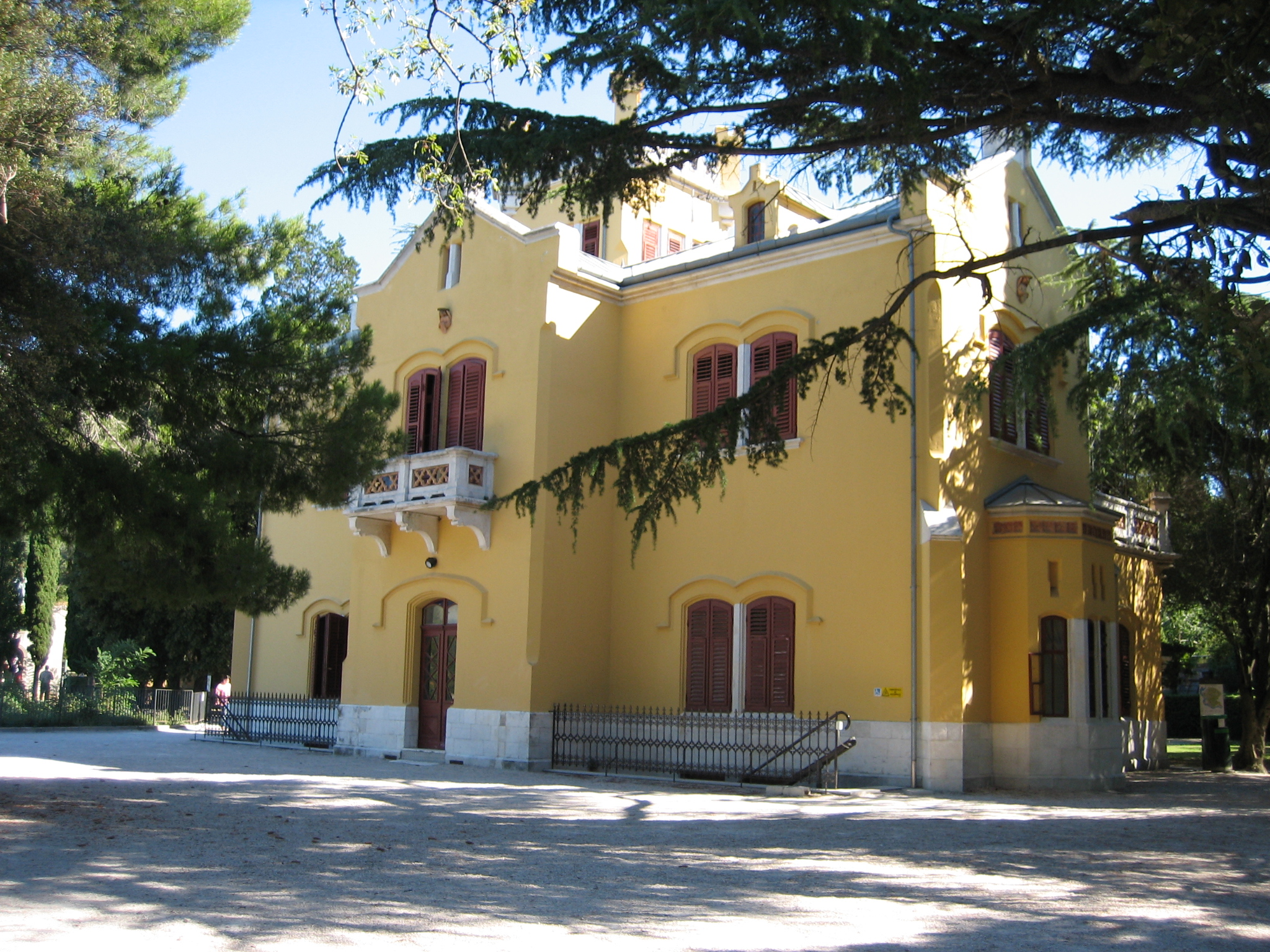
Miramare Castelletto

Visitors to the castle will be able to see the following: Maximilian's chambers and those of his consort, Charlotte; the guest rooms; the information room telling the history of the castle and the park's construction; the Duke Amedeo of Aosta's apartment with furnishings from the 1930s in the Rationalist style. All the rooms still feature the original furnishings, ornaments, furniture and objects dating back to the middle of the 19th century. Particularly noteworthy are the music room where Charlotte used to play the fortepiano, now on show in room VII. In room XIX there are a series of paintings by Cesare dell'Acqua depicting the history of Miramare. Lastly, visitors may visit the throne room, which was recently restored to its former splendour.

== See also ==
- Chapultepec Castle, Maximilian's palace in Mexico City
- List of castles in Italy
- Miramare railway station
